= 1964 =

1964 in various calendars
- Gregorian calendar: 1964; MCMLXIV
- Ab urbe condita: 2717
- Armenian calendar: 1413; ԹՎ ՌՆԺԳ
- Assyrian calendar: 6714
- Baháʼí calendar: 120–121
- Balinese saka calendar: 1885–1886
- Bengali calendar: 1370–1371
- Berber calendar: 2914
- British Regnal year: 12 Eliz. 2 – 13 Eliz. 2
- Buddhist calendar: 2508
- Burmese calendar: 1326
- Byzantine calendar: 7472–7473
- Chinese calendar: 癸卯年 (Water Rabbit); 4661 or 4454 — to — 甲辰年 (Wood Dragon); 4662 or 4455
- Coptic calendar: 1680–1681
- Discordian calendar: 3130
- Ethiopian calendar: 1956–1957
- Hebrew calendar: 5724–5725
- Hindu calendars
- Vikram Samvat: 2020–2021
- Shaka Samvat: 1885–1886
- Kali Yuga: 5064–5065
- Holocene calendar: 11964
- Igbo calendar: 964–965
- Iranian calendar: 1342–1343
- Islamic calendar: 1383–1384
- Japanese calendar: Shōwa 39 (昭和３９年)
- Javanese calendar: 1895–1896
- Juche calendar: 53
- Julian calendar: Gregorian minus 13 days
- Korean calendar: 4297
- Minguo calendar: ROC 53 民國53年
- Nanakshahi calendar: 496
- Thai solar calendar: 2507
- Tibetan calendar: ཆུ་མོ་ཡོས་ལོ་ (female Water-Hare); 2090 or 1709 or 937 — to — ཤིང་ཕོ་འབྲུག་ལོ་ (male Wood-Dragon); 2091 or 1710 or 938

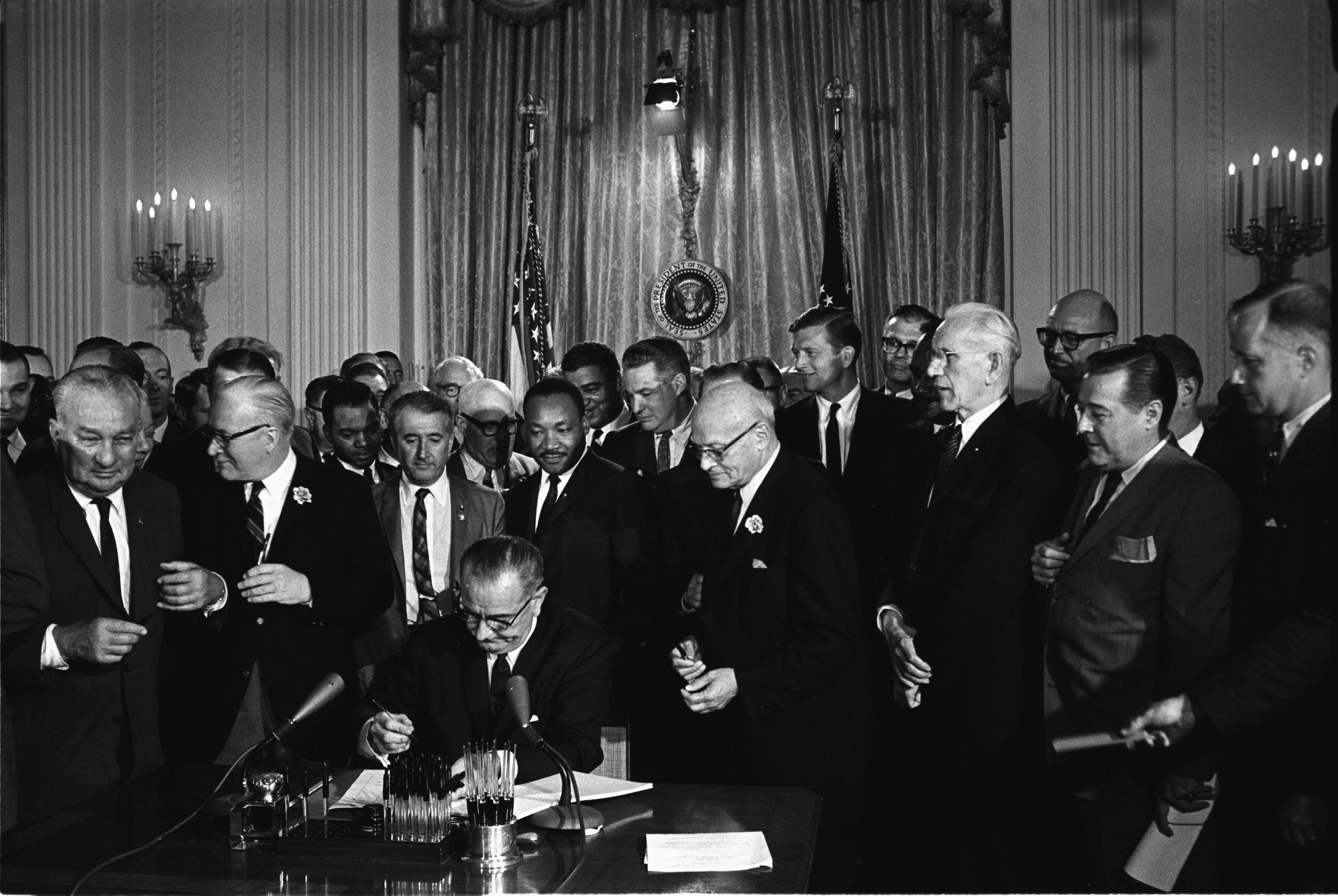
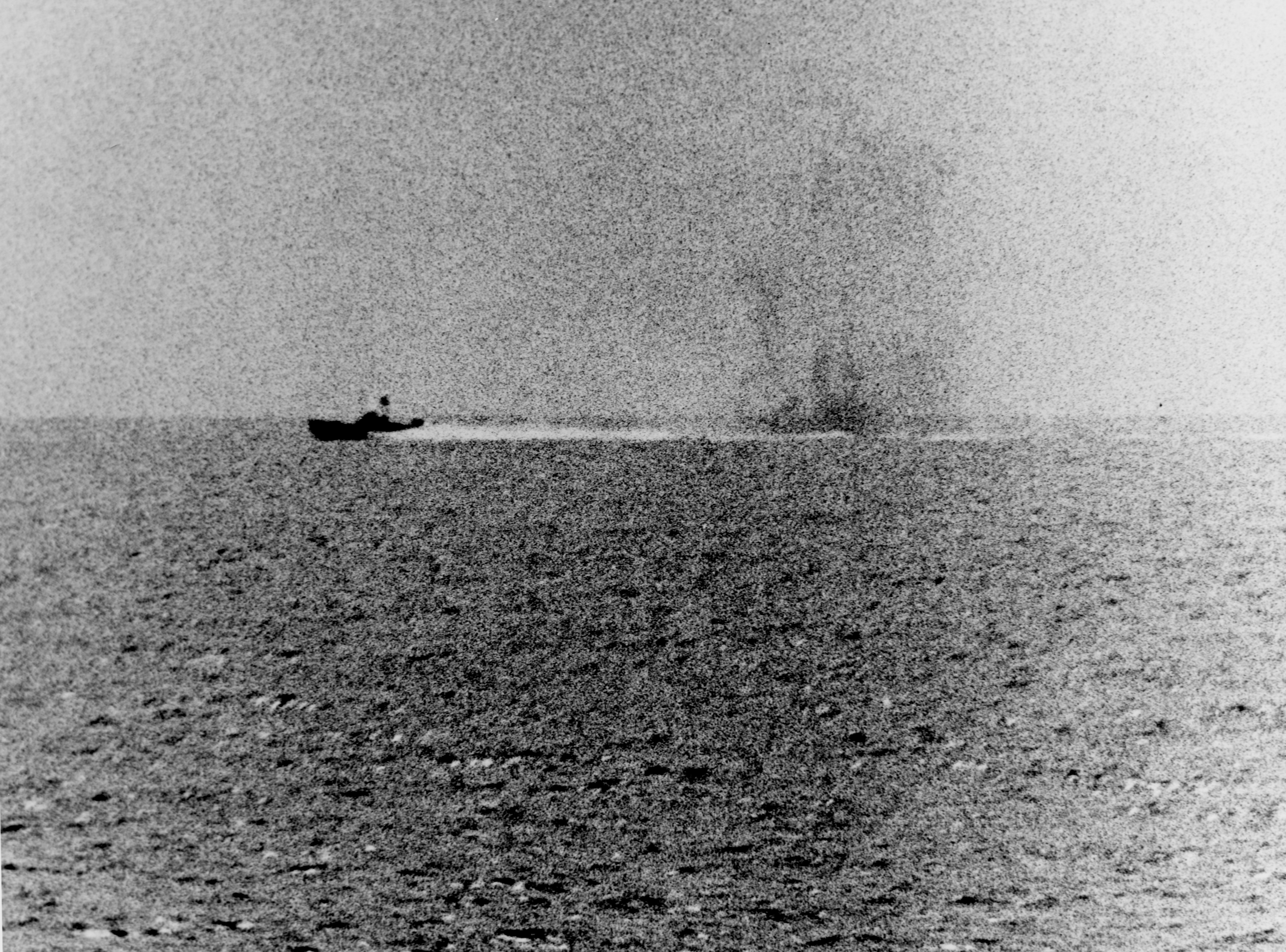
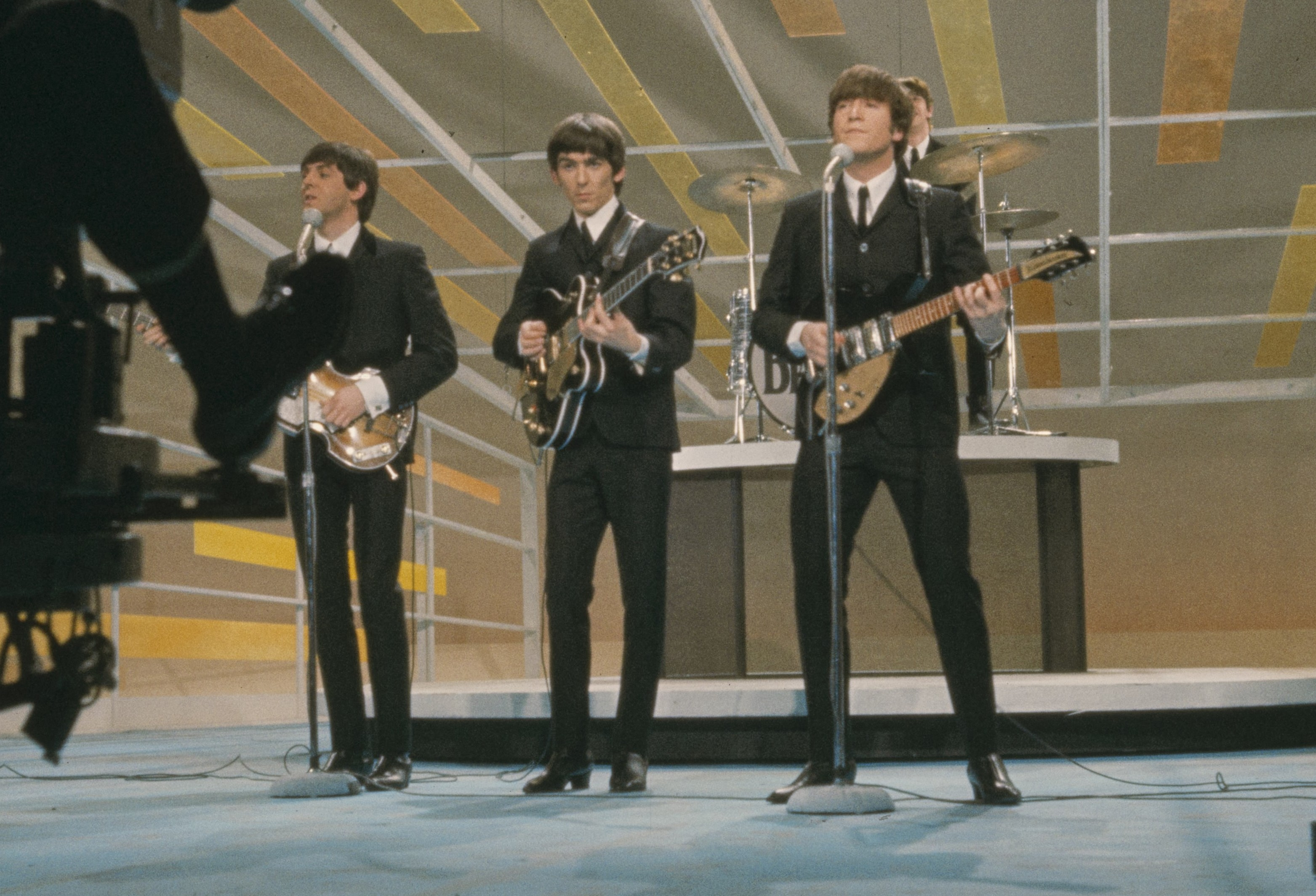
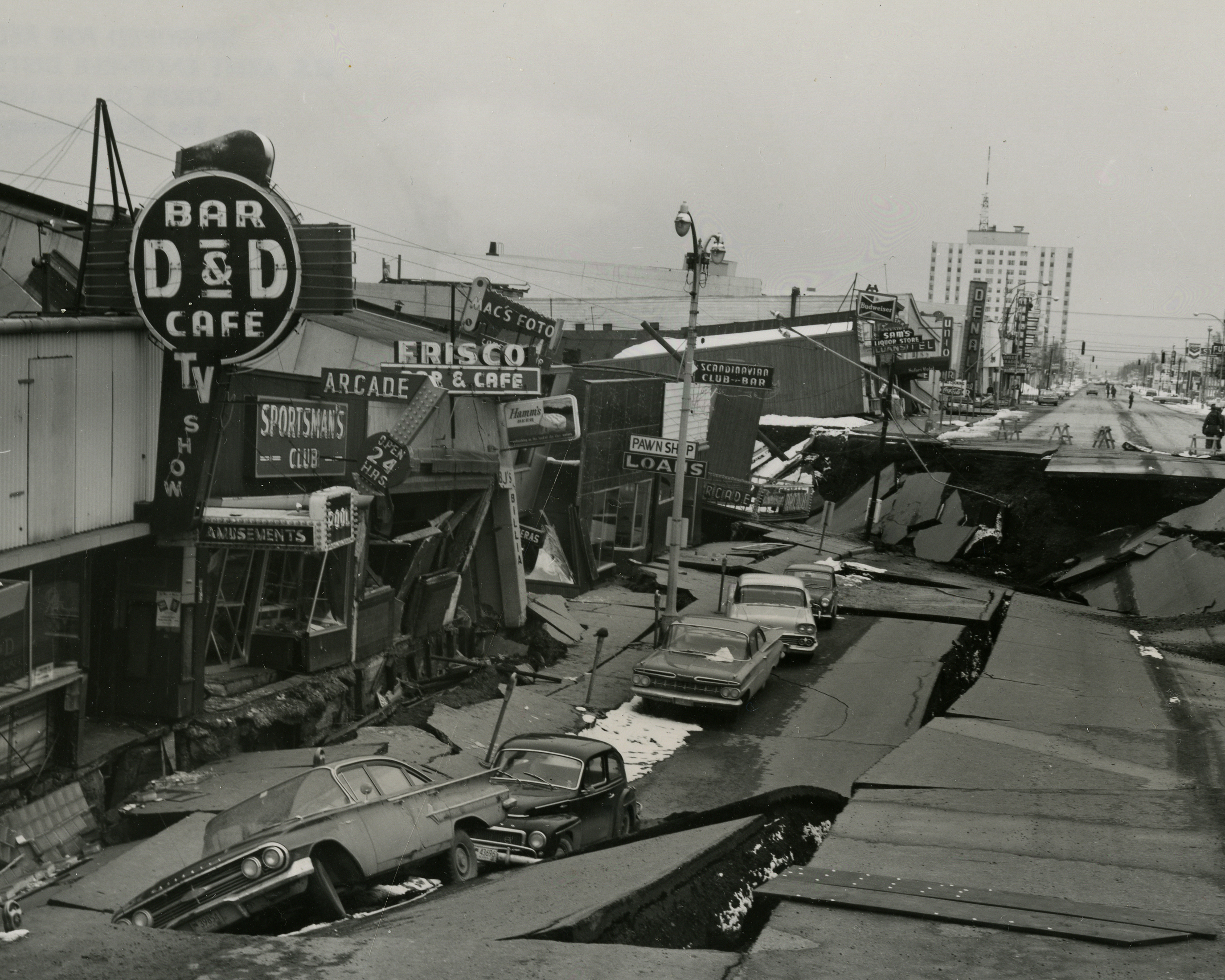
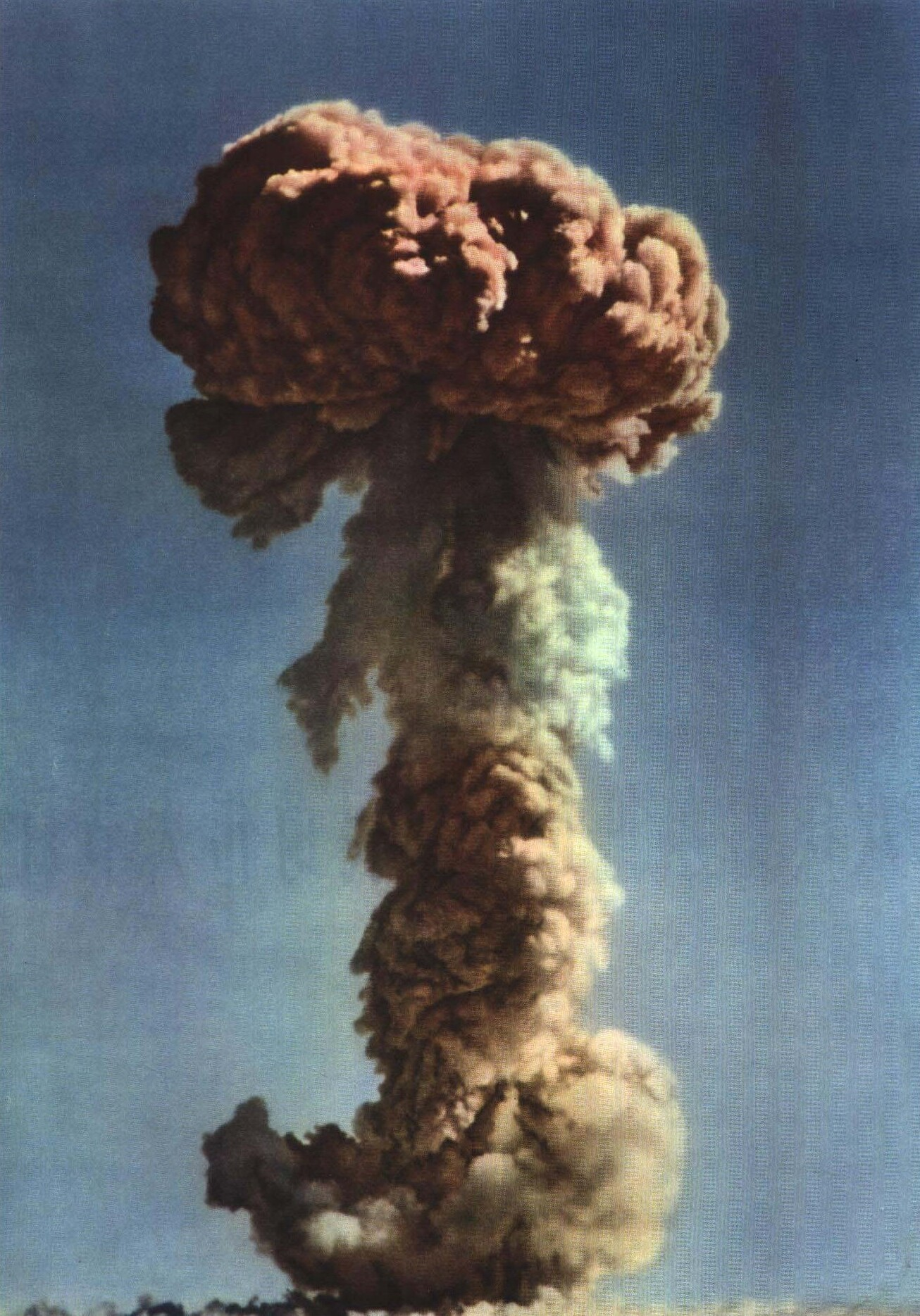
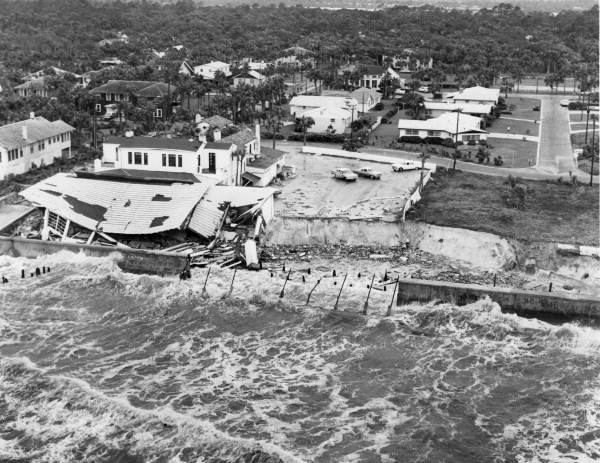
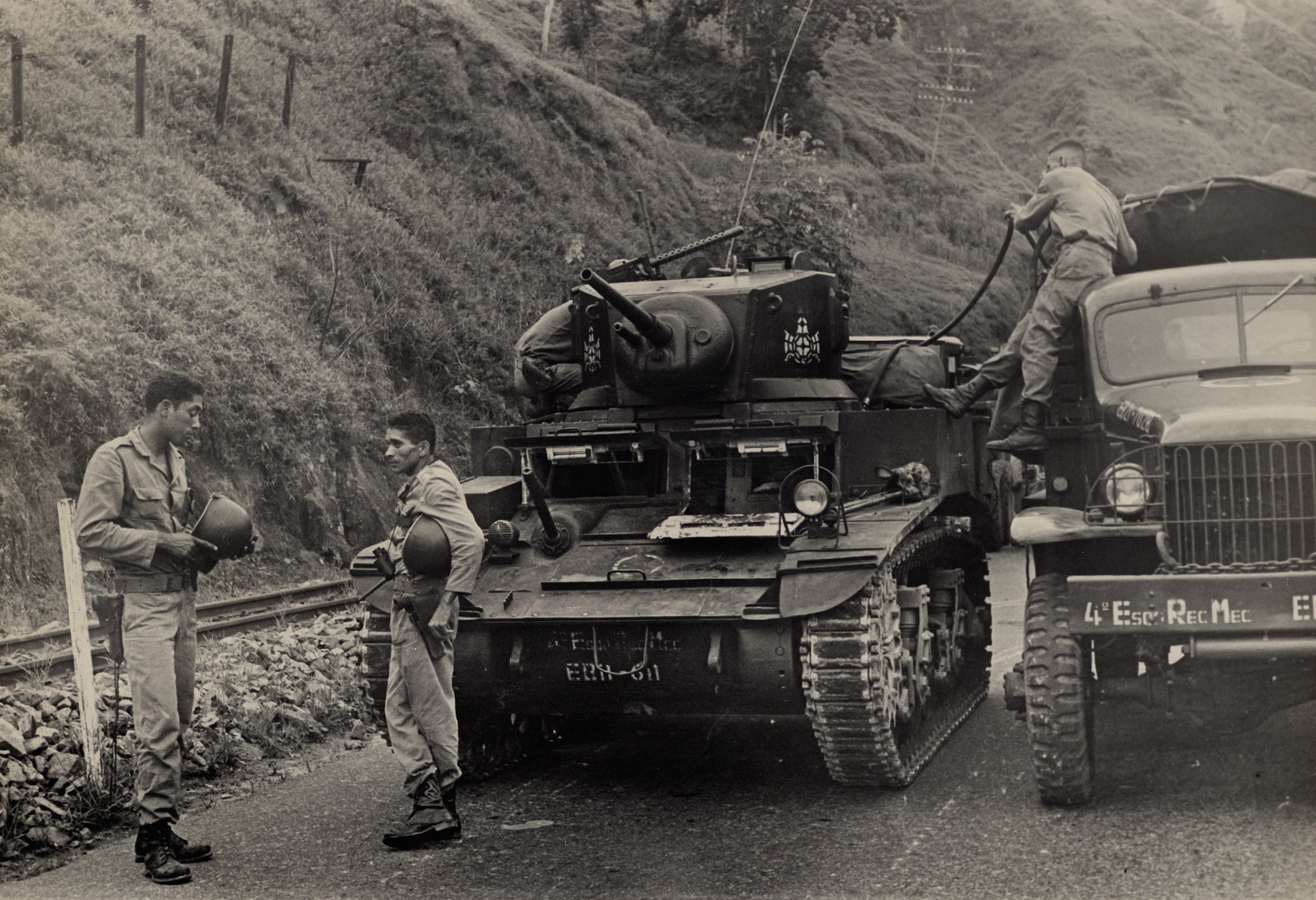
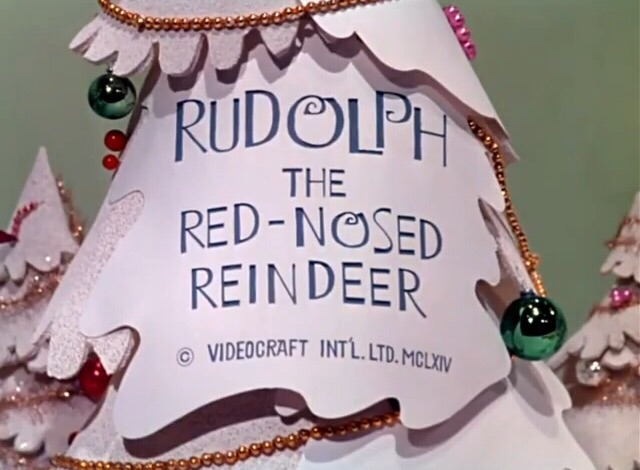
From top to bottom, left to right: The Civil Rights Act of 1964 ends legal segregation in the United States; the Gulf of Tonkin incident escalates U.S. involvement in the Vietnam War; Beatlemania starts in the U.S. after The Beatles appear on The Ed Sullivan Show; the 1964 Summer Olympics in Tokyo mark Japan’s postwar return; the 1964 Alaska earthquake strikes near Anchorage, causing tsunamis and damage; Project 596 makes China the world’s fifth nuclear power; Hurricane Dora hits Florida; the 1964 Brazilian coup d'état overthrows João Goulart; and Rudolph the Red-Nosed Reindeer premieres on NBC.

1964 (MCMLXIV) was a leap year starting on Wednesday of the Gregorian calendar, the 1964th year of the Common Era (CE) and Anno Domini (AD) designations, the 964th year of the 2nd millennium, the 64th year of the 20th century, and the 5th year of the 1960s decade.

== Events ==
=== January ===
- January 1 – The Federation of Rhodesia and Nyasaland is dissolved.
- January 5 – In the first meeting between leaders of the Roman Catholic and Orthodox churches since the fifteenth century, Pope Paul VI and Patriarch Athenagoras I of Constantinople meet in Jerusalem.
- January 6 – A British firm, the Leyland Motor Corp., announces the sale of 450 buses to the Cuban government, challenging the United States blockade of Cuba.

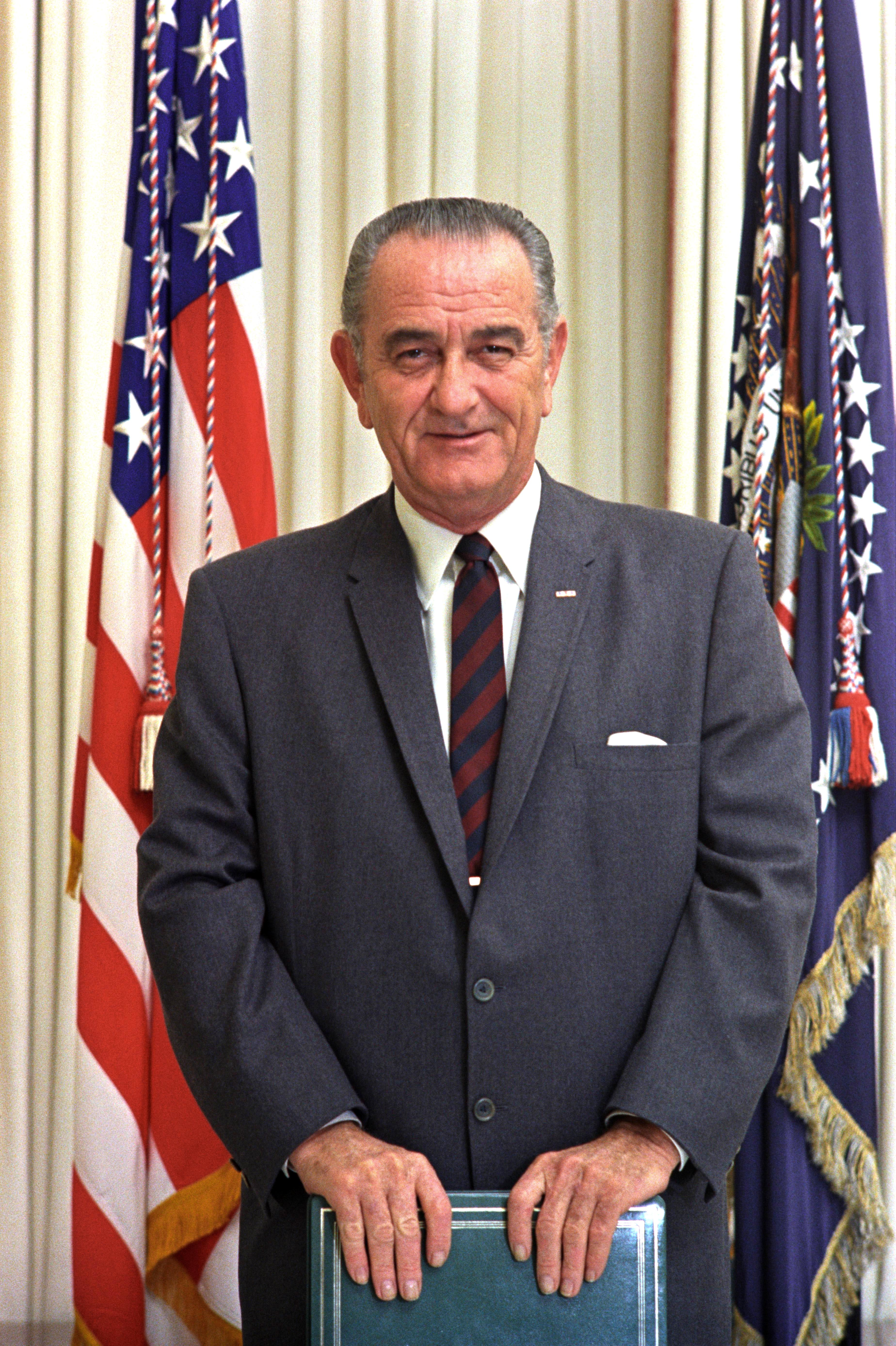
January 8: U.S. President Lyndon B. Johnson's War on Poverty

- January 9 – Martyrs' Day: Armed clashes between United States troops and Panamanian civilians in the Panama Canal Zone precipitate a major international crisis, resulting in the deaths of 21 Panamanians and 4 U.S. soldiers.
- January 11 – United States Surgeon General Luther Terry reports that smoking may be hazardous to one's health (the first such statement from the U.S. government).
- January 22 – Kenneth Kaunda is inaugurated as the first Prime Minister of Northern Rhodesia.
- January 28 – A U.S. Air Force jet training aircraft that strays into East Germany is shot down by Soviet fighters near Erfurt; all three crewmen are killed.
- January 29 – February 9 – The 1964 Winter Olympics are held in Innsbruck, Austria.
- January 29
  - The Soviet Union launches two scientific satellites, Elektron I and II, from a single rocket.
  - Ranger 6 is launched by the US space agency NASA, on a mission to carry television cameras and crash-land on the Moon.
- January 30 – General Nguyễn Khánh leads a bloodless military coup d'état, replacing Dương Văn Minh as Prime Minister of South Vietnam.

=== February ===
- February 4 – The Government of the United States authorizes the Twenty-fourth Amendment to the United States Constitution, outlawing the poll tax.
- February 5 – India backs out of its promise to hold a plebiscite in the disputed territory of Kashmir. In 1948, India had taken the issue of Kashmir to the United Nations Security Council and offered to hold a plebiscite in the held Kashmir under UN supervision.
- February 9 – The Beatles perform for the first time for an American audience on The Ed Sullivan Show to a record television audience of 73 million people, launching Beatlemania in the United States, as part of The British Invasion.
- February 10 – Melbourne–Voyager collision: 82 Australian sailors die when a Royal Australian Navy aircraft carrier and a destroyer collide off New South Wales, Australia.
- February 11
  - Greeks and Turks begin fighting in Limassol, Cyprus.
  - The Republic of China severs diplomatic relations with France because of French recognition of the People's Republic of China.
- February 17 – Gabonese president Léon M'ba is toppled by a military coup and his arch-rival, Jean-Hilaire Aubame, is installed in his place. However, French intervention restores M'ba's government the next day.
- February 25 – Cassius Clay (later Muhammad Ali) beats Sonny Liston in Miami Beach, Florida, and is crowned the heavyweight champion of the world.
- February 27 – The Italian government asks for help to keep the Leaning Tower of Pisa from toppling over.

=== March ===
- March 6
  - Constantine II becomes King of Greece, upon the death of his father King Paul.
  - American boxer Cassius Clay announces the change of his name to Muhammad Ali.
- March 18 – 1964 Moscow protest: Approximately 50 Moroccan students break into the embassy of Morocco in the Soviet Union and stage an all-day sit-in protesting against sentencing of eleven people to death for the alleged assassination attempt of King Hassan II of Morocco.
- March 20–June 6 – The first United Nations Conference on Trade and Development takes place.
- March 20 – The precursor of the European Space Agency, ESRO (European Space Research Organization) is established per an agreement signed on June 14, 1962.
- March 21 – Non ho l'età (music by Nicola Salerno, text by Mario Panzeri), sung by Gigliola Cinquetti, wins the Eurovision Song Contest 1964 (staged in Copenhagen) for Italy.
- March 27 (Good Friday) – The Great Alaskan earthquake, the second-most powerful known (and the most powerful earthquake recorded in North American history) at a magnitude of 9.2, strikes Southcentral Alaska, killing 125 people and inflicting massive damage to the city of Anchorage.
- March 28 – King Saud of Saudi Arabia abdicates. His brother, Prince Faisal, does not officially assume the throne until November.
- March 31 – The military overthrows Brazilian President João Goulart in a coup, starting 21 years of dictatorship in Brazil, lasting until 1985.

=== April ===
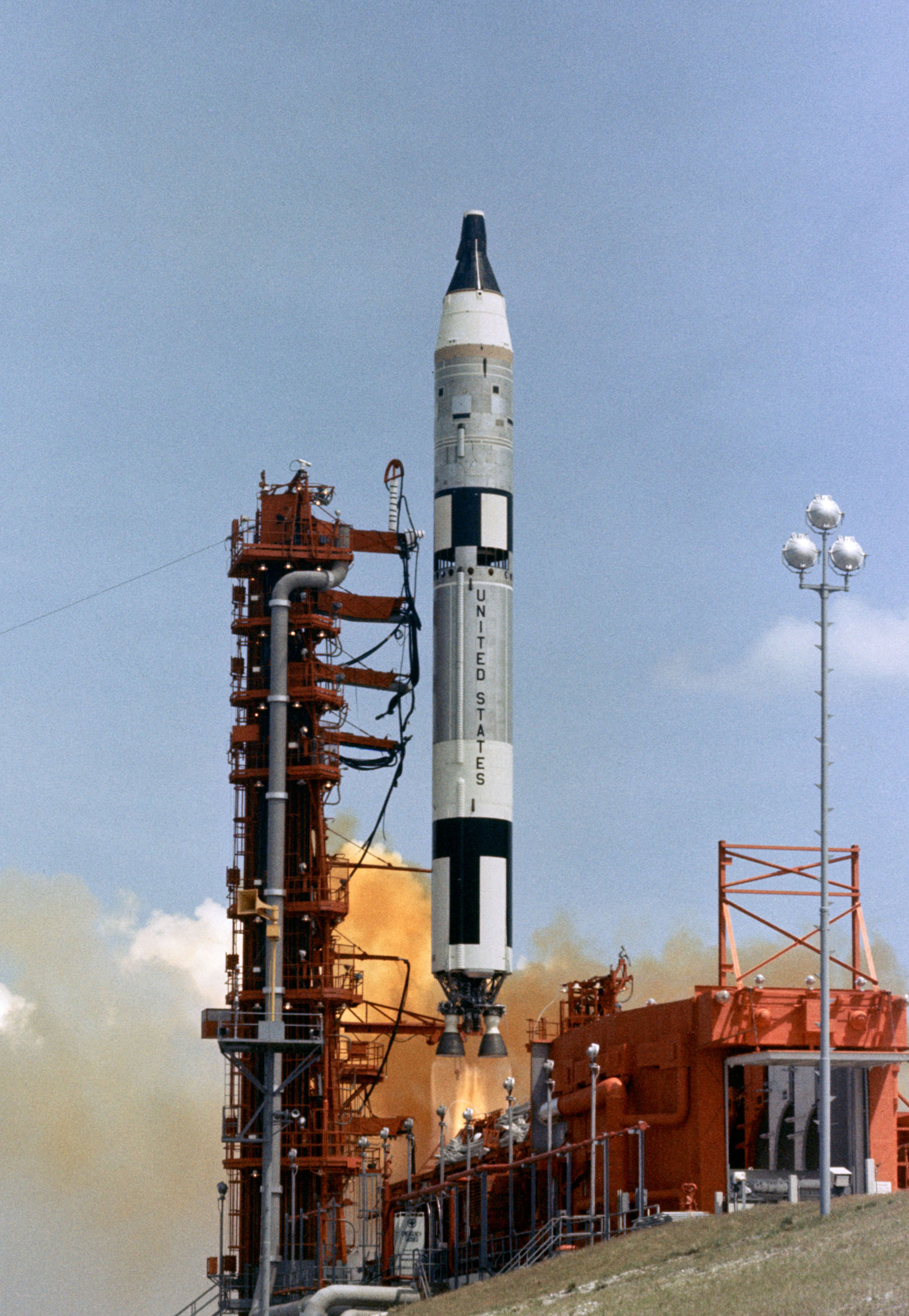
April 8: Gemini 1 launched

- April 8 – The U.S. Gemini 1 is launched, the first unmanned test of the 2-man spacecraft.
- April 9 – The United Nations Security Council adopts by a 9–0 vote a resolution deploring a British air attack on a fort in Yemen 12 days earlier, in which 25 persons were reported killed.
- April 11 – The Brazilian Congress elects Field Marshal Humberto de Alencar Castelo Branco as President of Brazil.
- April 13 – At the 36th Academy Awards ceremony, Sidney Poitier becomes the first African-American to win an Academy Award in the category Best Actor in a Leading Role in Lilies of the Field.
- April 16 – In the Assize Court at Buckingham, England, sentences totalling 307 years are passed on twelve men who stole £2,600,000 in used bank notes, after holding up the night train from Glasgow to London in August 1963 – a heist that becomes known as the Great Train Robbery.
- April 17 – Jerrie Mock completes the first around-the-world airplane flight by a woman. Her solo flight in the Spirit of Columbus, which took 29 1/2 days, took off and landed at the Port Columbus International Airport in Ohio.
- April 19 – In Laos, the coalition government of Prince Souvanna Phouma is deposed by a right-wing military group, led by Brig. Gen. Kouprasith Abhay. Not supported by the United States, the coup is ultimately unsuccessful, and Souvanna Phouma is reinstated, remaining as Prime Minister until 1975.
- April 20
  - U.S. President Lyndon B. Johnson in New York, and Soviet Premier Nikita Khrushchev in Moscow, simultaneously announce plans to cut back production of materials for making nuclear weapons.
  - Nelson Mandela makes his "I Am Prepared to Die" speech at the opening of the Rivonia Trial, a key event for the anti-apartheid movement.
  - In the UK, BBC Two television starts broadcasting for the first time.
  - British businessman Greville Wynne, imprisoned in Moscow since 1963 for spying, is exchanged for Soviet spy Gordon Lonsdale.
- April 25 – Thieves steal the head of the Little Mermaid statue in Copenhagen, Denmark. Although the attack is attributed to Jørgen Nash, the Danish media blame painter Henrik Bruun, who never confesses to the crime.
- April 26 – Tanganyika and Zanzibar merge to form Tanzania.

=== May ===
- May 1 – At 4:00 a.m., John George Kemeny and Thomas Eugene Kurtz run the first computer program written in BASIC (Beginners' All-purpose Symbolic Instruction Code), an easy to learn high level programming language which they have created. BASIC is eventually included on many computers and even some games consoles.
- May 2
  - Vietnam War: Attack on USNS Card – An explosion caused by Viet Cong commandos causes carrier USNS Card to sink in the port of Saigon.
  - Some 400–1,000 students march through Times Square, New York, and another 700 in San Francisco, in the first major student demonstration against the Vietnam War. Smaller marches also occur in Boston, Seattle, and Madison, Wisconsin.
  - Henry Hezekiah Dee and Charles Eddie Moore, hitchhiking in Meadville, Mississippi, are kidnapped, beaten and murdered by members of the Ku Klux Klan. Their badly decomposed bodies are found by chance in July during the search for missing activists Chaney, Goodman, and Schwerner.
- May 7
  - Pacific Air Lines Flight 773 crashes near San Ramon, California, killing all 44 aboard; the FBI later reports that a cockpit recorder tape indicates that the pilot and co-pilot had been shot by a suicidal passenger.
  - At a mail rockets demonstration by Gerhard Zucker on Hasselkopf Mountain near Braunlage (Lower Saxonia, Germany), three people are killed by a rocket explosion.
- May 9 – South Korean President Park Chung Hee reshuffles his Cabinet, after a series of student demonstrations against his efforts to restore diplomatic and trade relations with Japan.
- May 12 – Twelve young men in New York City publicly burn their draft cards to protest against the Vietnam War, the first such act of war resistance.
- May 23 – Madeline Dassault, 63, wife of a French plane manufacturer and politician, is kidnapped while leaving her car in front of her Paris home; she is found unharmed the next day in a farmhouse 27 miles (43 km) from Paris.
- May 24–25 – The crowd at a football match in Lima, Peru, riots over a referee's decision in the Peru-Argentina game; 319 are killed, 500 injured.
- May 27 – The ongoing Colombian conflict starts, with an assault by 1,000 Colombian soldiers, backed by fighter planes and helicopters, against about 50 guerrillas in the community of Marquetalia.
- May 28 – The Charter of the Palestine Liberation Organization (PLO) is released by the Arab League.
- May 29 – Having deposed them in a January coup, South Vietnamese leader Nguyen Khanh has rival Generals Tran Van Don and Le Van Kim convicted of "lax morality".

=== June ===
- June 3 – South Korean President Park Chung Hee declares martial law in Seoul, after 10,000 student demonstrators overpower police.
- June 11
  - Greece rejects direct talks with Turkey over Cyprus.
  - Cologne school massacre: In Cologne, West Germany, Walter Seifert attacks students and teachers in an elementary school with a flamethrower, killing 10 and injuring 21.
- June 12 – Nelson Mandela and 7 others are sentenced to life imprisonment in South Africa, and sent to the Robben Island prison.
- June 14 – Freedom Summer, a volunteer Civil Rights project in the United States intended to promote voter registration for as many African Americans as possible in Mississippi, begins with orientation sessions for the 300 volunteers at Western College for Women, Oxford, Ohio.
- June 20 – The Ford GT40 makes its first appearance at the 24 Hours of Le Mans. Its first victory will come 2 years later in 1966.
- June 21 – Spain beats the Soviet Union 2–1 to win the 1964 European Nations Cup.
- June 26 – Moise Tshombe returns to the Democratic Republic of the Congo from exile in Spain.

=== July ===
- July 2 – The United States Civil Rights Act of 1964 is enacted.
- July 6 – Malawi receives its independence from the United Kingdom.
- July 16 – Six days of race riots begin in Harlem, New York, United States, apparently prompted by the shooting of a teenager.
- July 18 – Judith Graham Pool publishes her discovery of cryoprecipitate, a frozen blood clotting product made from plasma primarily to treat hemophiliacs around the world.
- July 19 – Vietnam War: At a rally in Saigon, South Vietnamese Prime Minister and military leader Nguyễn Khánh calls for expanding the war into North Vietnam.
- July 20
  - Vietnam War: Viet Cong forces attack a provincial capital, killing 11 South Vietnamese military personnel and 40 civilians (30 of which are children).
  - The National Movement of the Revolution is established in the Republic of the Congo, becoming the country's sole legal political party.
- July 21 – Race riots begin in Singapore between ethnic Chinese and Malays.
- July 22 – The second meeting of the Organisation of African Unity is held.
- July 24 – A minor criticality accident takes place at a United Nuclear Corporation Fuels recovery plant in Wood River Junction, Rhode Island, United States, causing the death of one worker.
- July 27 – Vietnam War: The U.S. sends 5,000 more military advisers to South Vietnam, bringing the total number of United States forces in Vietnam to 21,000.
- July 31 – Ranger program: Ranger 7 sends back the first close-up photographs of the Moon (images are 1,000 times clearer than anything ever seen from Earth-bound telescopes).

=== August ===
- August 2 – Vietnam War: United States destroyer Maddox is attacked in the Gulf of Tonkin. Air support from the carrier USS Ticonderoga sinks one gunboat, while the other two leave the battle.
- August 5
  - Vietnam War: Operation Pierce Arrow – Aircraft from carriers USS Ticonderoga and USS Constellation bomb North Vietnam in retaliation for strikes against U.S. destroyers in the Gulf of Tonkin.
  - The Simba rebel army in the Democratic Republic of the Congo captures Stanleyville, and takes 1,000 Western hostages.
- August 7 – Vietnam War: The United States Congress passes the Gulf of Tonkin Resolution, giving U.S. President Lyndon B. Johnson broad war powers to deal with North Vietnamese attacks on U.S. forces.
- August 8 – A Rolling Stones gig in Scheveningen gets out of control. Riot police end the gig after about fifteen minutes, upon which spectators start to fight the riot police.
- August 13 – The last judicial hangings in the United Kingdom take place when murderers Gwynne Owen Evans and Peter Anthony Allen are executed in Manchester and Liverpool respectively.
- August 16 – Vietnam War: In a coup, General Nguyễn Khánh replaces Dương Văn Minh as South Vietnam's chief of state and establishes a new constitution, drafted partly by the U.S. Embassy.
- August 18 – The International Olympic Committee bans South Africa from the Tokyo Olympics on the grounds that its teams are racially segregated.
- August 20 – The International Telecommunications Satellite Consortium (Intelsat) began to work.
- August 22 – Goalkeeper Derek Forster of Sunderland becomes the youngest-ever player to play in the English Football League, aged 15 years and 185 days.
- August 24–27 – The Democratic National Convention in Atlantic City nominates incumbent President Lyndon B. Johnson for a full term, and U.S. Senator Hubert Humphrey of Minnesota as his running mate.
- August 27 – Walt Disney's Mary Poppins has its world premiere in Los Angeles. It will go on to become Disney's biggest moneymaker, and winner of 5 Academy Awards, including a Best Actress for Julie Andrews. It is the first Disney film to be nominated for Best Picture.
- August 28–30 – Philadelphia 1964 race riot: Tensions between African American residents and police lead to 341 injuries and 774 arrests.

=== September ===
- September 2 – Indian Hungry generation poets, including Malay Roy Choudhury, are arrested on charges of conspiracy against the state and obscenity in literature.
- September 4 – The Forth Road Bridge opens over the Firth of Forth in Scotland.
- September 10 – The African Development Bank (AfDB) is founded.
- September 11 – In Jacksonville, Florida, during a tour of the United States, John Lennon announces that the Beatles will not play to a segregated audience.
- September 14
  - The third period of the Second Vatican Council opens.
  - The London Daily Herald ceases publication, replaced by The Sun.
- September 18 – In Athens, King Constantine II of Greece marries Princess Anne-Marie of Denmark, who becomes Europe's youngest Queen at age 18 years, 19 days.
- September 21 – The island of Malta obtains independence from the United Kingdom.
- September 24 – The Warren Commission, the first official investigation of the assassination of United States President John F. Kennedy, submits its written report.
- September 25 – The Mozambican War of Independence is launched by FRELIMO.

=== October ===
October 10–24: The 1964 Summer Olympics begins

- October – Robert Moog demonstrates the prototype Moog synthesizer.
- October 1
  - Three thousand student activists at the University of California, Berkeley, surround and block a police car from taking a CORE volunteer arrested for not showing his ID, when he violated a ban on outdoor activist card tables. This protest eventually explodes into the Berkeley Free Speech Movement.
  - The Shinkansen high-speed rail system, the world's first such system, is inaugurated in Japan, for the first sector between Tokyo and Osaka.
- October 5
  - Twenty-three men and thirty-one women escape to West Berlin through a narrow tunnel under the Berlin Wall.
  - Elizabeth II and The Duke of Edinburgh begin an 8-day visit to Canada.
- October 10–24 – The 1964 Summer Olympics are held in Tokyo, Japan, the first in an Asian country.
- October 12 – The Soviet Union launches Voskhod 1 into Earth orbit as the first spacecraft with a multi-person crew and the first flight without space suits. The flight is cut short and lands again on October 13 after 16 orbits.
- October 14 – American civil rights movement leader Martin Luther King Jr. becomes the youngest recipient of the Nobel Peace Prize, which is awarded to him for leading non-violent resistance to end racial prejudice in the United States.
- October 14–15 – Nikita Khrushchev is deposed as leader of the Soviet Union; Leonid Brezhnev and Alexei Kosygin assume power.
- October 15 – 1964 United Kingdom general election: The Labour Party wins a narrow victory over Sir Alec Douglas-Home's Conservative Party, which has been in power for 13 years. The new prime minister is Harold Wilson.
- October 17 – 596 (nuclear test): The People's Republic of China explodes an atomic bomb in Sinkiang.
- October 22
  - Canada: A Federal Multi-Party Parliamentary Committee selects a design to become the new official Flag of Canada.
  - A 5.3 kiloton nuclear device is detonated at the Tatum Salt Dome, 21 miles (34 km) from Hattiesburg, Mississippi, as part of the Vela Uniform program. This test is the Salmon phase of the Atomic Energy Commission's Project Dribble.
- October 24 – Northern Rhodesia, a former British protectorate, becomes the independent Republic of Zambia, ending 73 years of British rule.
- October 26 – Eric Edgar Cooke becomes the last man executed in Western Australia, for murdering 8 citizens in Perth between 1959 and 1963.
- October 27 – In the Democratic Republic of the Congo, rebel leader Christopher Gbenye takes 60 Americans and 800 Belgians hostage.
- October 29 – A collection of irreplaceable gemstones, including the 565-carat (113.0 g) Star of India, is stolen from the American Museum of Natural History in New York City.

=== November ===
- November 1 – Mortar fire from North Vietnamese forces rains on the Bien Hoa Air Base, killing four U.S. servicemen, wounding 72, and destroying five B-57 jet bombers and other planes.
- November 3
  - 1964 United States presidential election: Incumbent President Lyndon B. Johnson defeats Republican challenger Barry Goldwater with over 60 percent of the popular vote.
  - The Bolivian government of President Víctor Paz Estenssoro is overthrown by a military rebellion led by General Alfredo Ovando Candía, commander-in-chief of the armed forces.
- November 5 – Mariner program: Mariner 3 spacecraft is launched from Cape Kennedy but fails.
- November 10 – Australia partially reintroduces compulsory military service due to the Indonesian Confrontation.
- November 19 – The United States Department of Defense announces the closing of 95 military bases and facilities, including Fort Jay, the Brooklyn Navy Yard and the Brooklyn Army Terminal.
- November 21
  - Second Vatican Council: The third period of the Catholic Church's ecumenical council closes. Lumen gentium, the Dogmatic Constitution on the Church, is promulgated.
  - The Verrazano–Narrows Bridge across New York Bay opens to traffic (the world's longest suspension bridge at this time).
- November 24 – Belgian paratroopers and mercenaries capture Stanleyville, but a number of hostages die in the fighting, among them American Evangelical Covenant Church missionary Paul Carlson.
- November 28
  - Mariner program: NASA launches the Mariner 4 space probe from Cape Kennedy toward Mars to take television pictures of that planet in July 1965.
  - Vietnam War: United States National Security Council members, including Robert McNamara, Dean Rusk, and Maxwell Taylor, agree to recommend a plan for a 2-stage escalation of bombing in North Vietnam, to President Lyndon B. Johnson.
  - France performs an underground nuclear test at In Ecker, Algeria.

=== December ===
- December 1 – Gustavo Díaz Ordaz takes office as President of Mexico.
- December 3
  - Berkeley Free Speech Movement: Police arrest about 800 students at the University of California, Berkeley, following their takeover of and massive sit-in at the Sproul Hall administration building. The sit-in most directly protested the U.C. Regents' decision to punish student activists for what many thought had been justified civil disobedience earlier in the conflict.
  - The Danish football club Brøndby IF is founded as a merger between the two local clubs Brøndbyøster Idrætsforening and Brøndbyvester Idrætsforening. The club wins the national championship Danish Superliga 10 times, and the Danish Cups six times, after joining the Danish top-flight football league in 1981.
- December 5 – Australian Senate election, 1964: The Liberal/Country Coalition Government led by Prime Minister Robert Menzies hold their status quo, while the Labor Party led by Arthur Calwell lose one seat to the Democratic Labor Party, who hold the balance of power in the Senate alongside independent Reg Turnbull.
- December 10 – Dr. Martin Luther King Jr. is awarded the Nobel Peace Prize in Oslo, Norway.
- December 11 – Che Guevara addresses the United Nations General Assembly. A bazooka attack is launched at the Headquarters of the United Nations in New York City.
- December 12 – Jamhuri Day: Kenya becomes a republic, with Jomo Kenyatta as its first President.
- December 14 – Heart of Atlanta Motel v. United States (379 US 241 1964): The U.S. Supreme Court rules that, in accordance with the Civil Rights Act of 1964, establishments providing public accommodation must refrain from racial discrimination.
- December 18 – The Christmas flood of 1964 begins in the United States, affecting the Pacific Northwest and some of Northern California. It will continue until January 7, resulting in 19 deaths, serious damage to buildings, roads and bridges, and the loss of 4,000 head of livestock.
- December 21 – The General Dynamics F-111 Aardvark supersonic attack aircraft, developed for the U.S. Air Force, makes its first flight, at Carswell Air Force Base, Texas.
- December 22
  - A cyclone in the Palk Strait destroys the Indian town of Dhanushkodi, killing 1800 people.
  - The Lockheed SR-71 Blackbird makes its first flight at Palmdale, California.
- December 24 – The Brinks Hotel in Saigon, Vietnam, is bombed by the Viet Cong, resulting in the deaths of two US soldiers and injuries to a further 60 people, including civilians.
- December 30 – The United Nations Conference on Trade and Development (UNCTAD) is established as a permanent organ of the UN General Assembly.

=== Date unknown ===
- Spring – First recognition of cosmic microwave background radiation as a detectable phenomenon.
- Jerome Horwitz synthesizes zidovudine (AZT), an antiviral drug which will later be used in treating HIV.
- Farrington Daniels becomes an early advocate of solar energy in his book Direct Use of the Sun's Energy, published by Yale University Press in the United States.
- Rudi Gernreich designs the original monokini topless swimsuit in the U.S.
- The Vishva Hindu Pariṣad is founded in India.

== Births ==
=== January ===
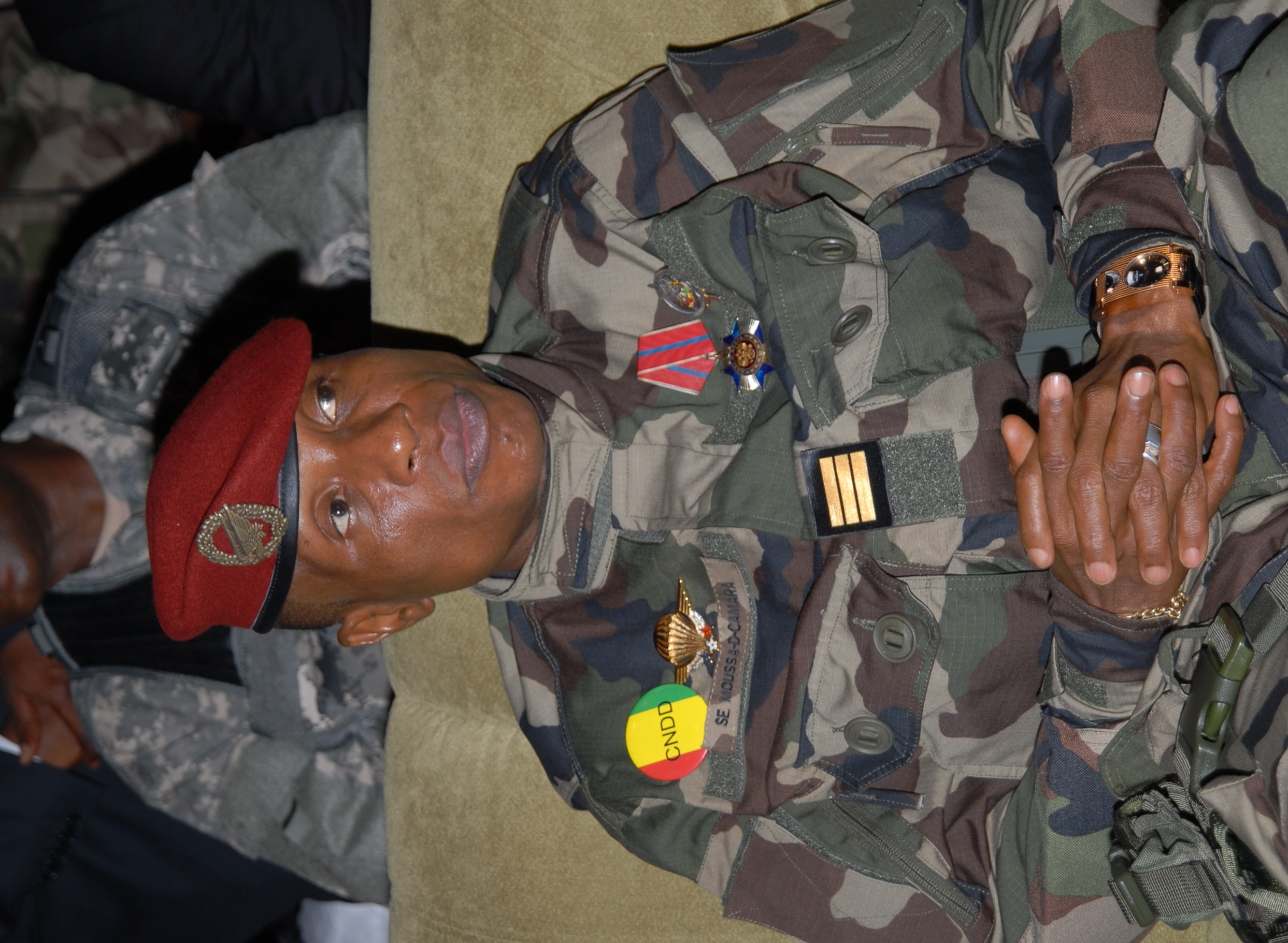
Moussa Dadis Camara

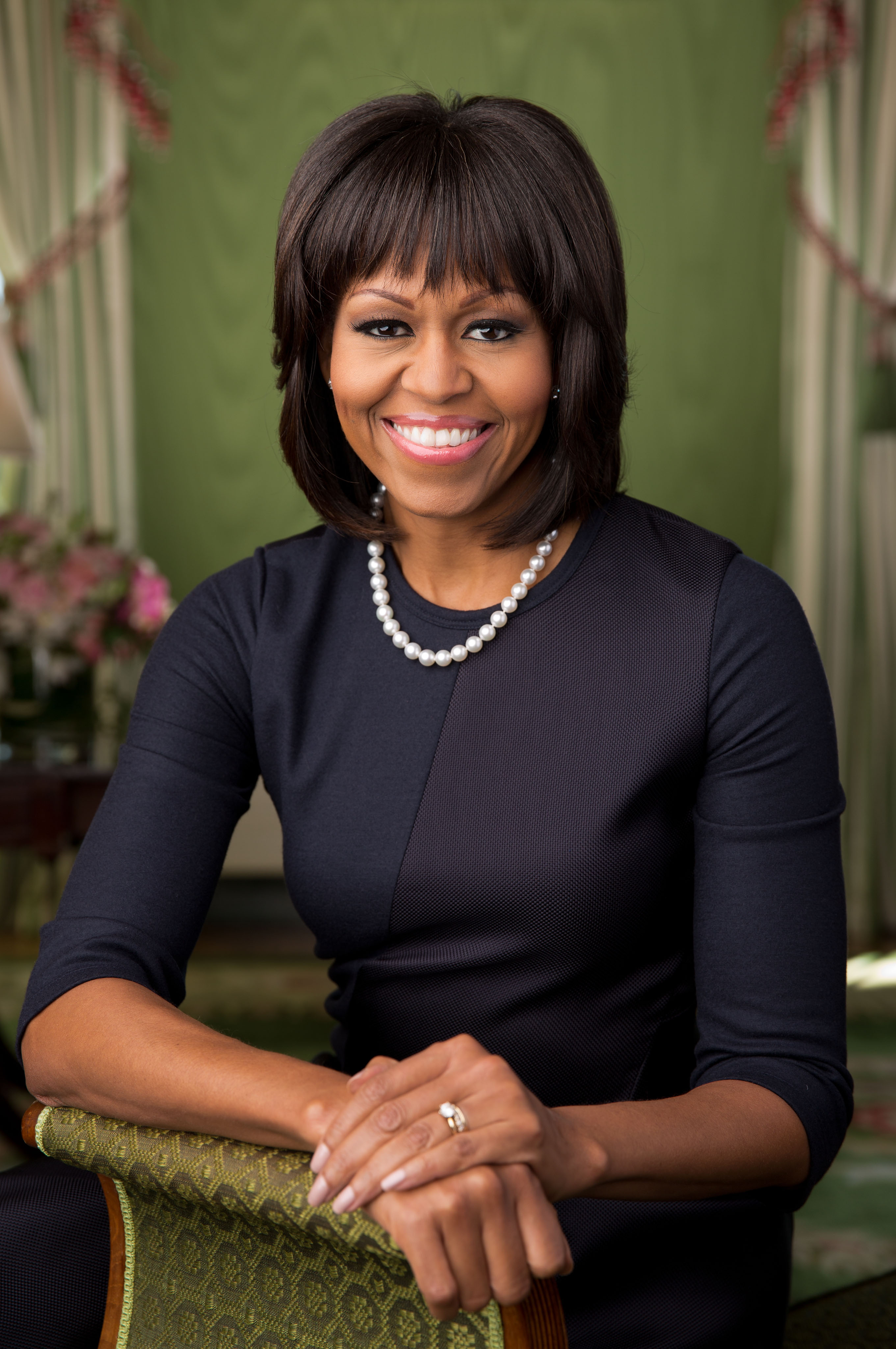
Michelle Obama

- January 1 – Moussa Dadis Camara, Guinean general and 3rd President of Guinea
- January 2 – Pernell Whitaker, American boxer (died 2019)
- January 4 – Alexandre Fadeev, Soviet figure skater
- January 5 – Miguel Ángel Jiménez, Spanish golfer
- January 6
  - Henry Maske, German boxer
  - Anthony Scaramucci, American financier, entrepreneur, and political figure
- January 7 – Nicolas Cage, American actor
- January 12 – Jeff Bezos, American Internet entrepreneur
- January 17 – Michelle Obama, American attorney and author, former First Lady of the United States
- January 27 – Bridget Fonda, American actress
- January 31 – Jeff Hanneman, American rock guitarist (Slayer) (died 2013)

=== February ===
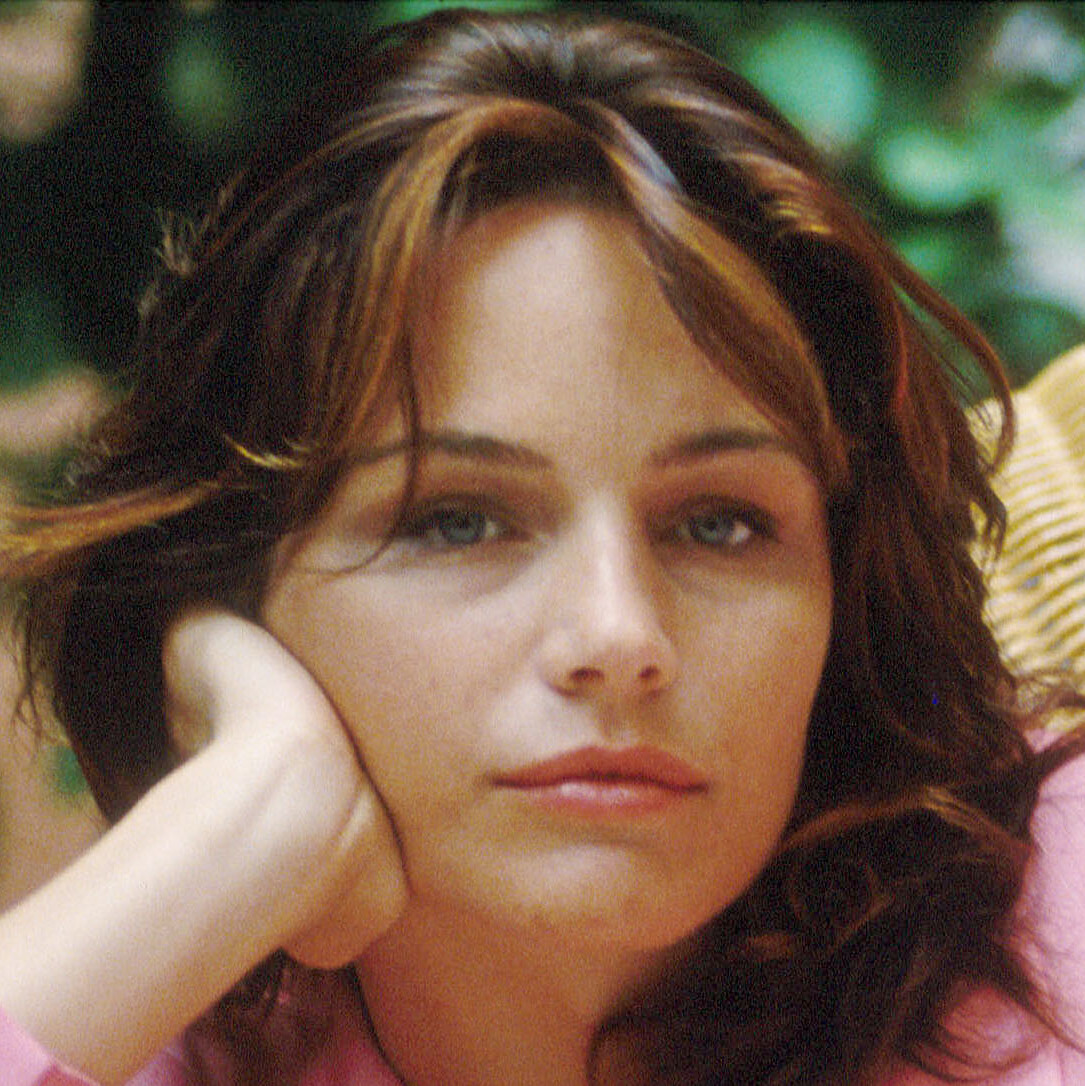
Francesca Neri

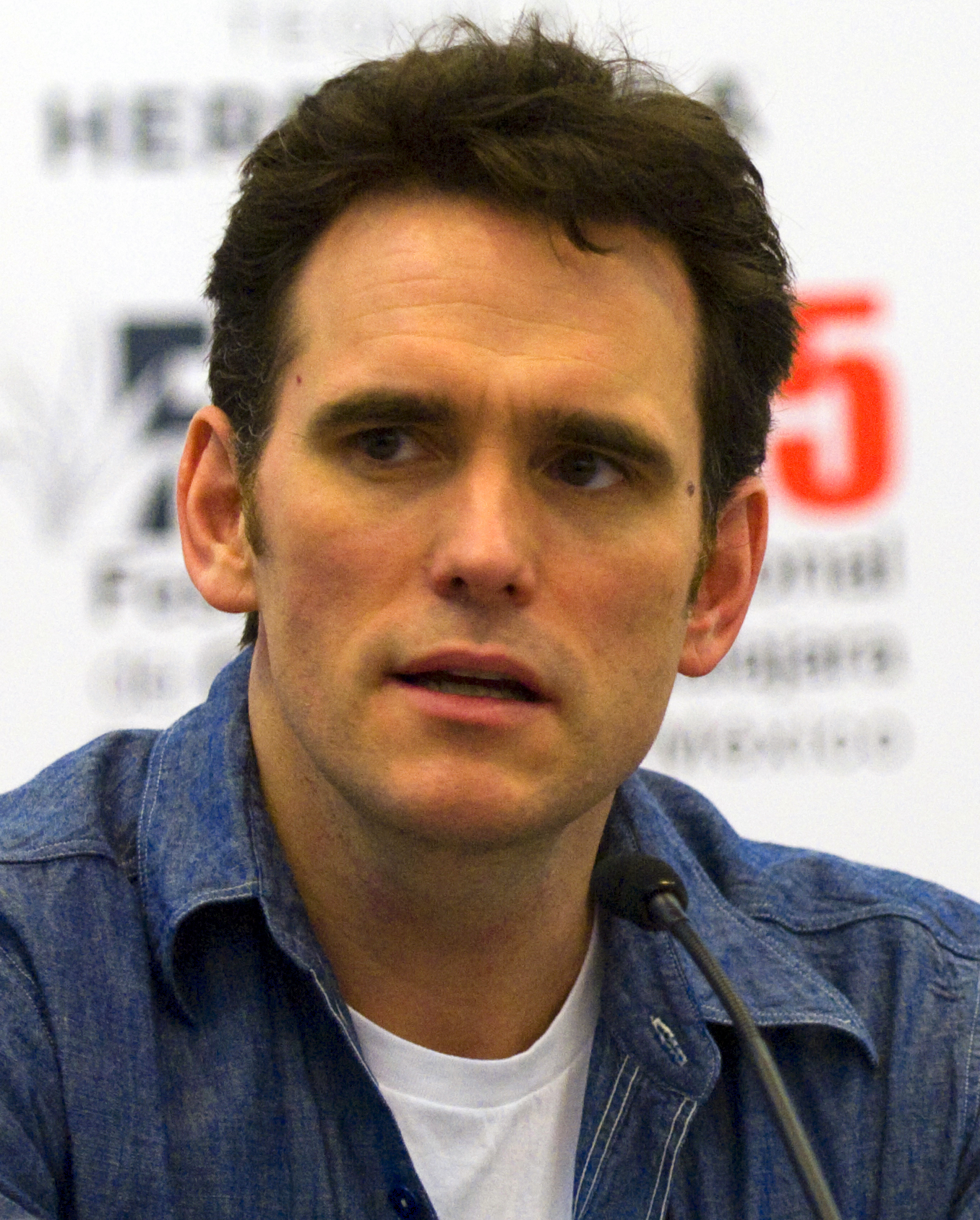
Matt Dillon

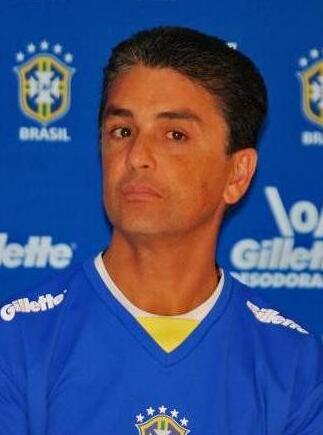
Bebeto

- February 1 – Eli Ohana, Israeli football player and club chairman
- February 5
  - Laura Linney, American actress
  - Duff McKagan, American rock musician and songwriter
- February 6 – Gord Downie, Canadian rock musician and singer (d. 2017)
- February 10 − Francesca Neri, Italian actress
- February 15 − Chris Farley, American actor and comedian (died 1997)
- February 16
  - Bebeto, Brazilian footballer
  - Christopher Eccleston, British actor
  - Valentina Yegorova, Russian distance runner
- February 18 − Matt Dillon, American actor and film director
- February 19 − Jennifer Doudna, American biochemist
- February 20 − Rudi Garcia, French football manager
- February 22 − Gigi Fernández, American tennis player
- February 24 – Yudas Sabaggalet, Indonesian politician

=== March ===
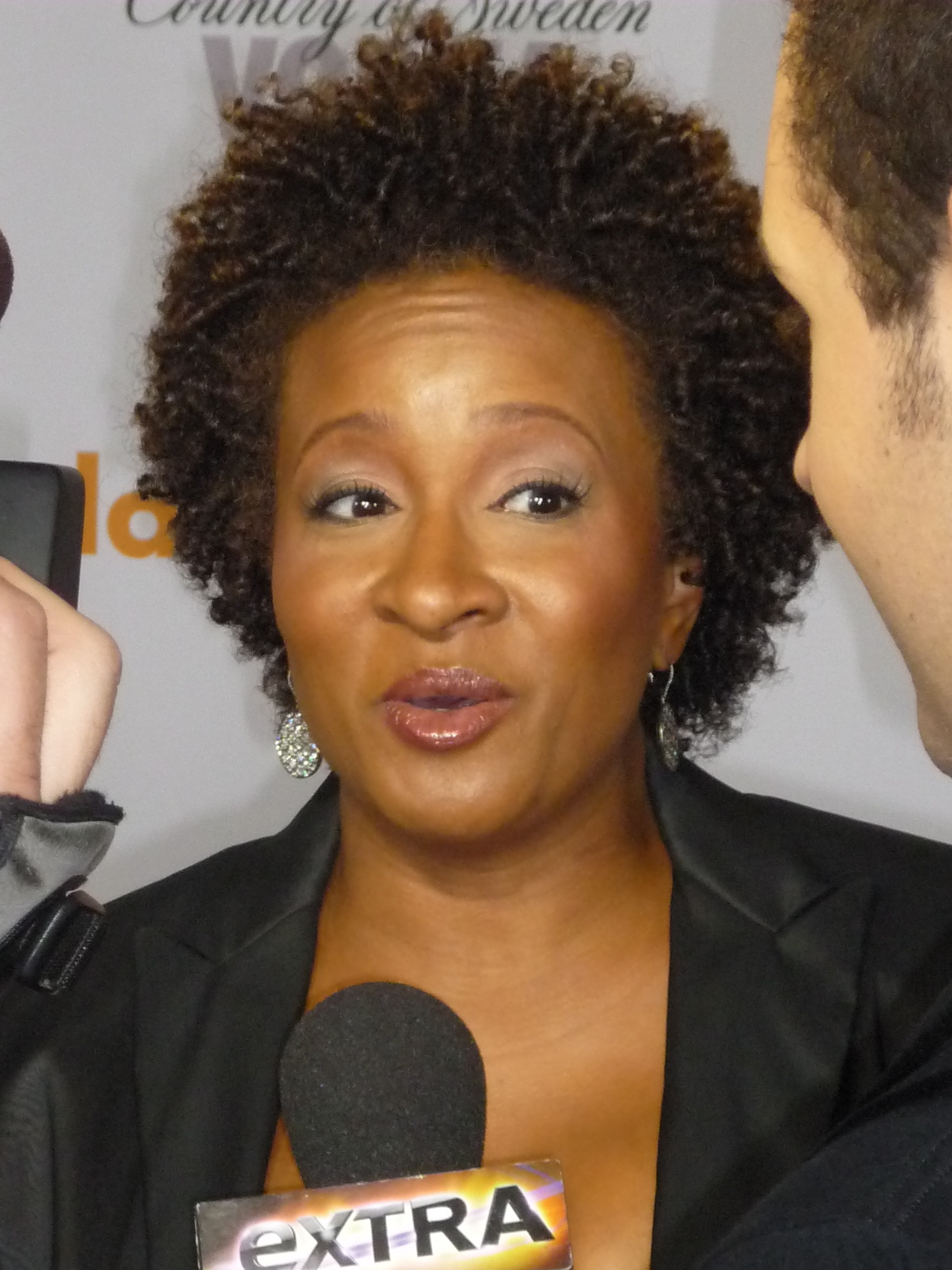
Wanda Sykes

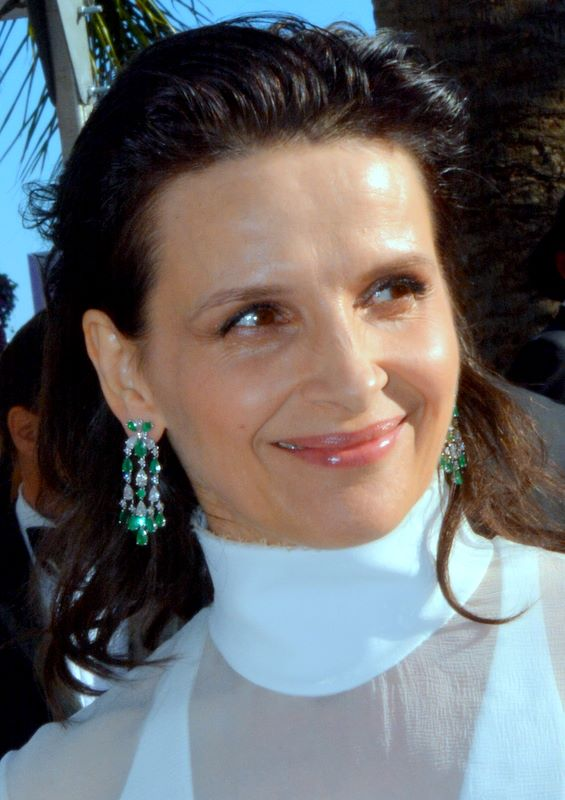
Juliette Binoche

- March 7
  - Bret Easton Ellis, American author
  - Vladimir Smirnov, Kazakh cross-country skier
  - Wanda Sykes, African-American comedian and actress
- March 9 – Juliette Binoche, French actress
- March 10
  - Neneh Cherry, Swedish-born singer-songwriter
  - Prince Edward, Duke of Edinburgh, British prince and third son (youngest child) of Queen Elizabeth II and Prince Philip, Duke of Edinburgh
- March 16
  - Pascal Richard, Swiss road bicycle racer
  - Gore Verbinski, American film director
- March 17 – Rob Lowe, American actor
- March 18 – Bonnie Blair, American speed skater
- March 24 – Liz McColgan, British long-distance runner athlete
- March 30 – Tracy Chapman, African-American singer

=== April ===
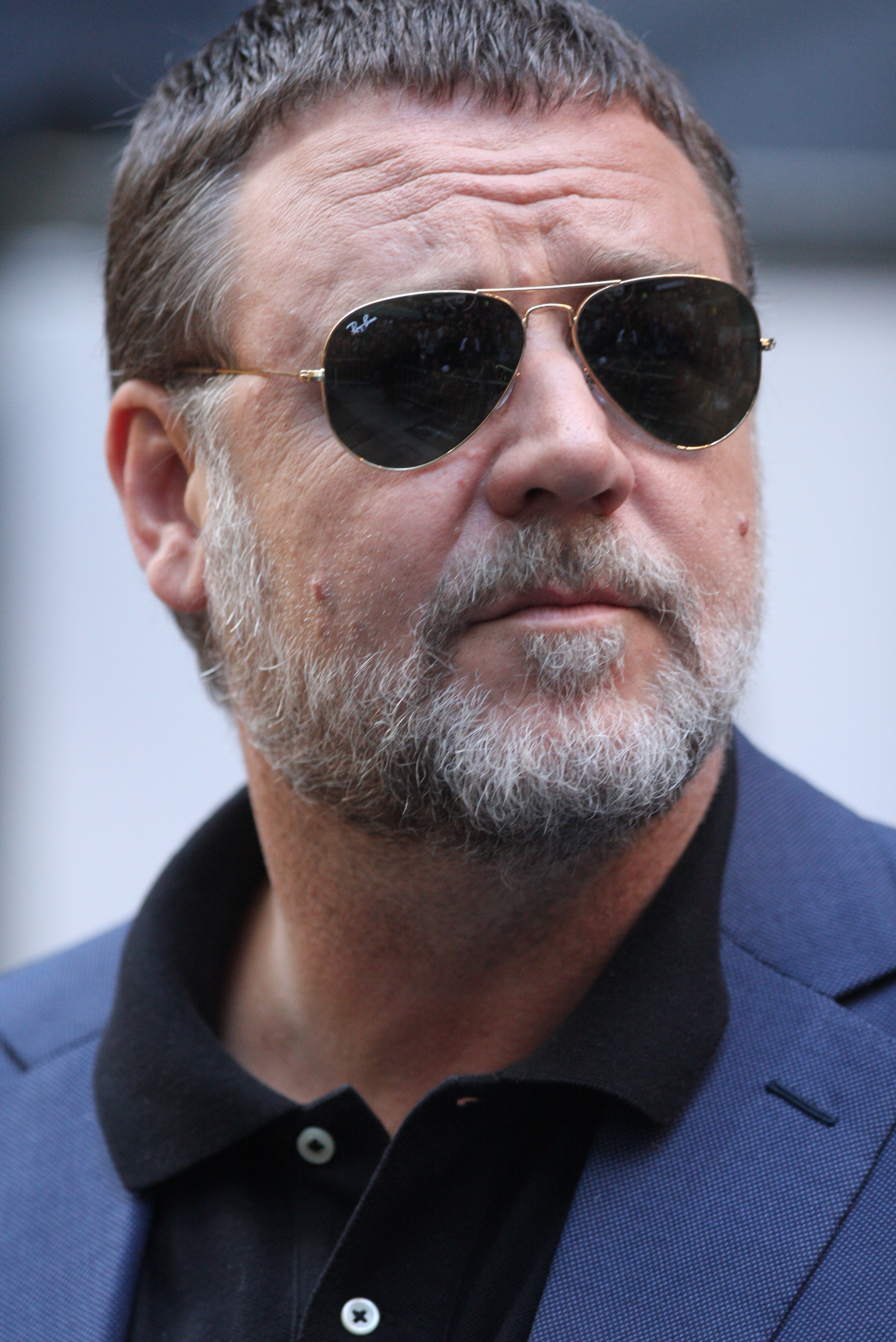
Russell Crowe

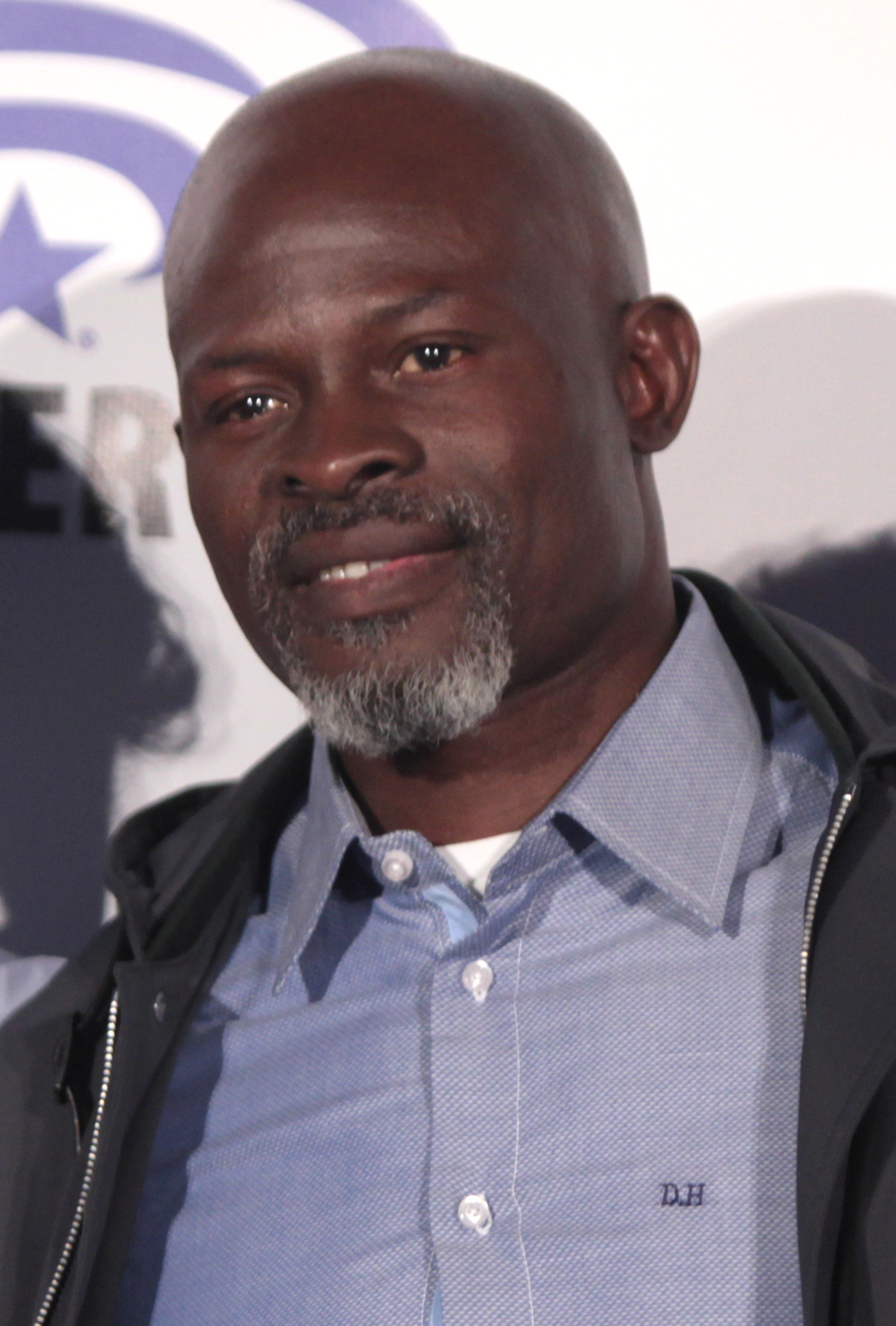
Djimon Hounsou

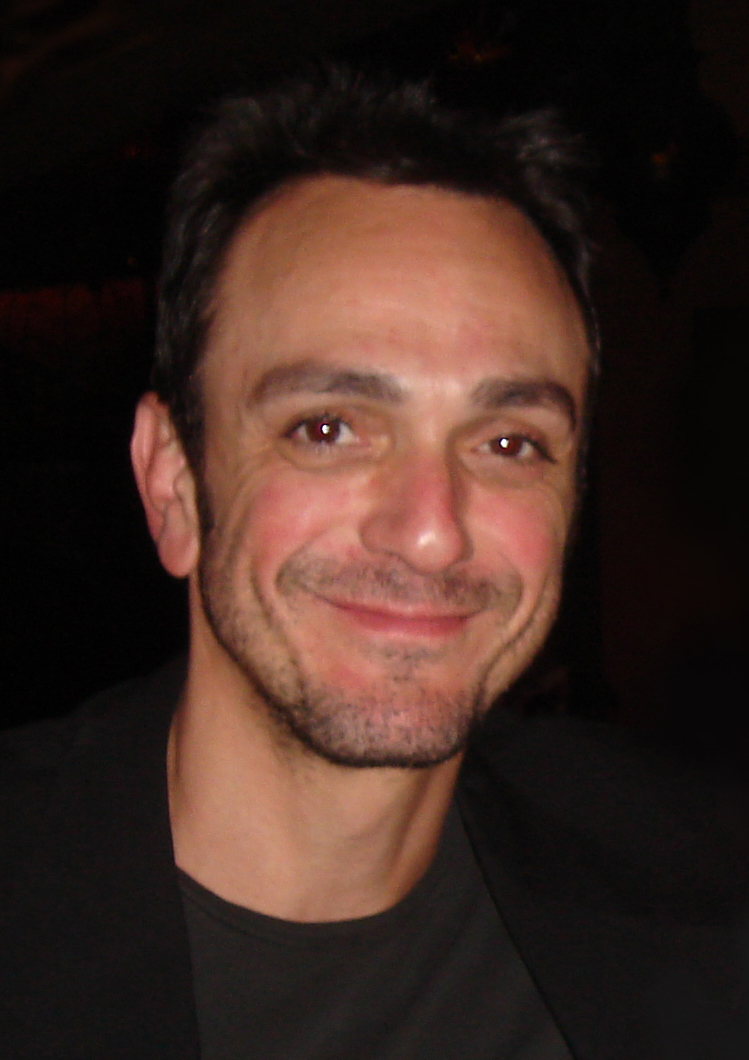
Hank Azaria

- April 1 – Erik Breukink, Dutch cyclist and manager
- April 3
  - Nigel Farage, British politician
  - Bjarne Riis, Danish cyclist
  - Yelena Ruzina, Russian Olympic athlete
- April 4 – David Cross, American actor and comedian
- April 7 – Russell Crowe, New Zealand-born actor
- April 10 – Hiroshi Tsuburaya, Japanese actor (died 2001)
- April 13 – John Swinney, Scottish politician, First Minister of Scotland
- April 14 – Jim Grabb, American tennis player
- April 16 – Esbjörn Svensson Swedish jazz pianist (d. 2008)
- April 17
  - Maynard James Keenan, American rock musician (Tool)
  - Rachel Notley, Canadian politician, Premier of Alberta 2015–2019
  - Tahmasib Ajdarov, Azerbaijani-Ukrainian scientist
- April 20
  - John Carney, American football player
  - Crispin Glover, American actor
  - Andy Serkis, English actor
- April 21
  - Ludmila Engquist, Russian-born Swedish hurdler
  - Ahmed Radhi, Iraqi footballer (d. 2020)
- April 23 – Gianandrea Noseda, Italian composer, music director of the National Symphony Orchestra
- April 24
  - Cedric the Entertainer, American actor and comedian
  - Djimon Hounsou, Beninese actor and model
- April 25 – Hank Azaria, American actor, voice artist and comedian
- April 28
  - Sarana Gunawardena, Sri Lankan politician
  - L'Wren Scott, American fashion designer (d. 2014)
- April 30 – Tony Fernandes, Malaysian entrepreneur and businessman

=== May ===
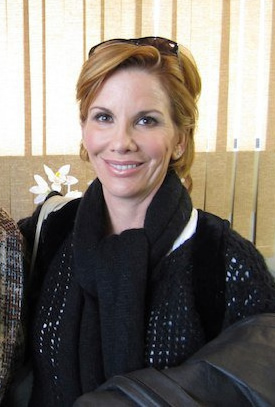
Melissa Gilbert

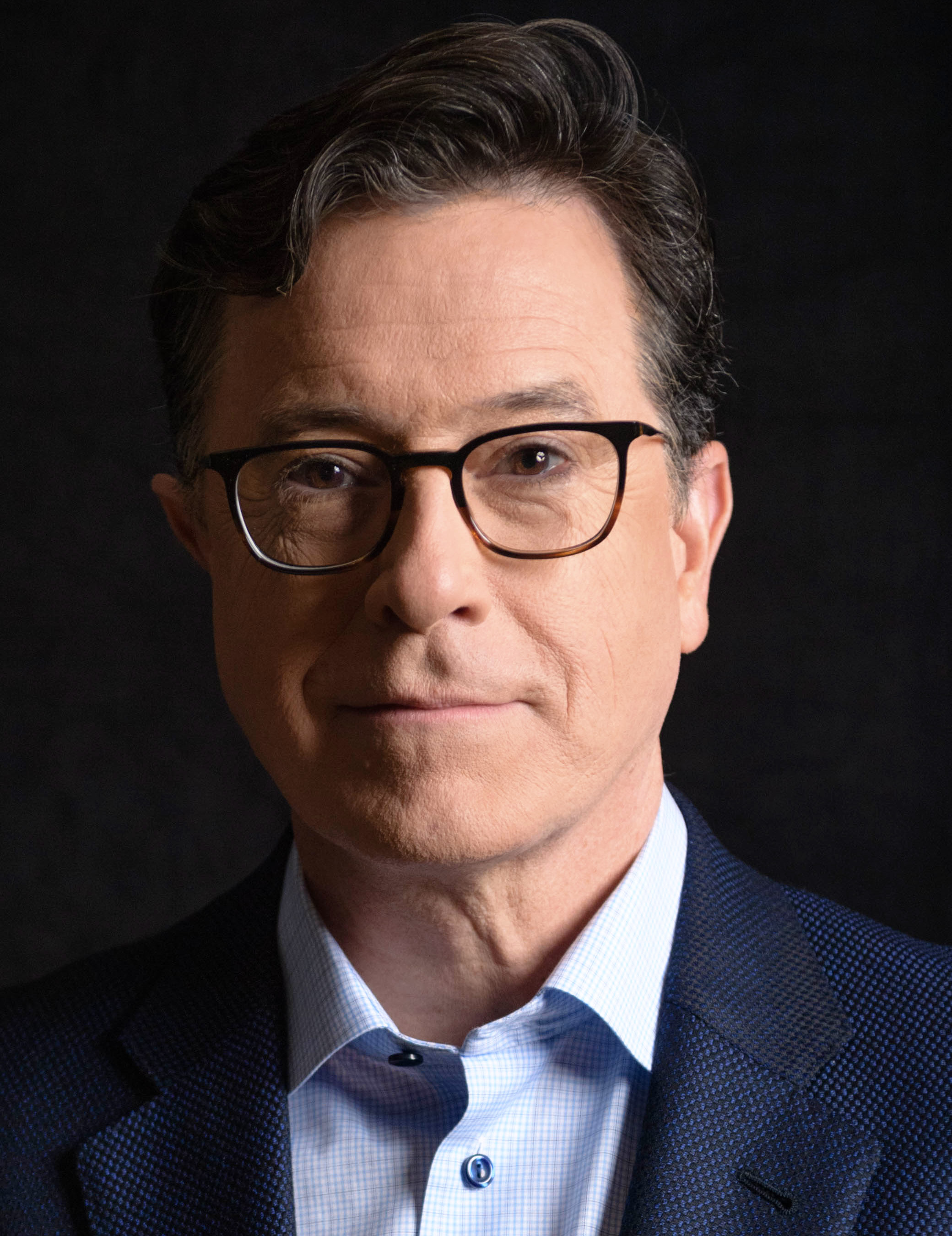
Stephen Colbert

- May 1 – Yvonne van Gennip, Dutch speed-skater
- May 5
  - Heike Henkel, German Olympic athlete
  - Minami Takayama, Japanese voice actress and singer (Two-Mix and DoCo)
- May 8 – Melissa Gilbert, American actress and president of the Screen Actors Guild
- May 10 – Emmanuelle Devos, French actress
- May 19 – Gitanas Nausėda, president of Lithuania
- May 20 – Charles Spencer, 9th Earl Spencer, British aristocrat, author, print journalist and broadcaster. Younger brother of Diana, Princess of Wales.
- May 21 – Rui Maria de Araújo, East Timorese politician
- May 23 – Ruth Metzler-Arnold, member of the Swiss Federal Council
- May 24 – Adrian Moorhouse, British swimmer
- May 25 – Ray Stevenson, Northern Irish-born actor (d. 2023)
- May 26 – Lenny Kravitz, American singer, songwriter, and actor
- May 28 – Jeff Fenech, Australian boxer
- May 30 – Tom Morello, American musician and political activist (Rage Against the Machine, Audioslave, Prophets of Rage)

=== June ===
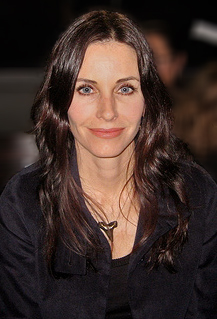
Courteney Cox

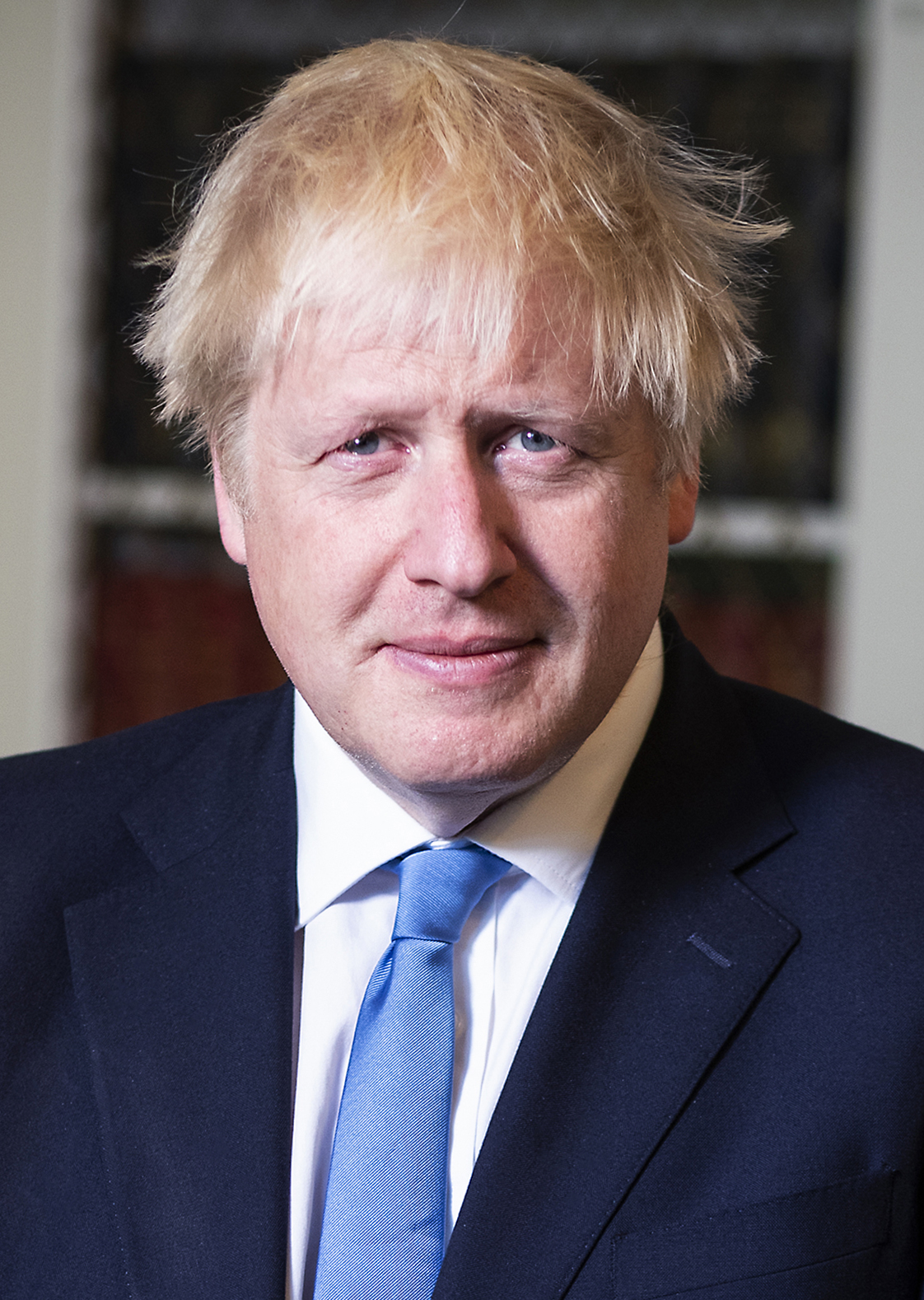
Boris Johnson

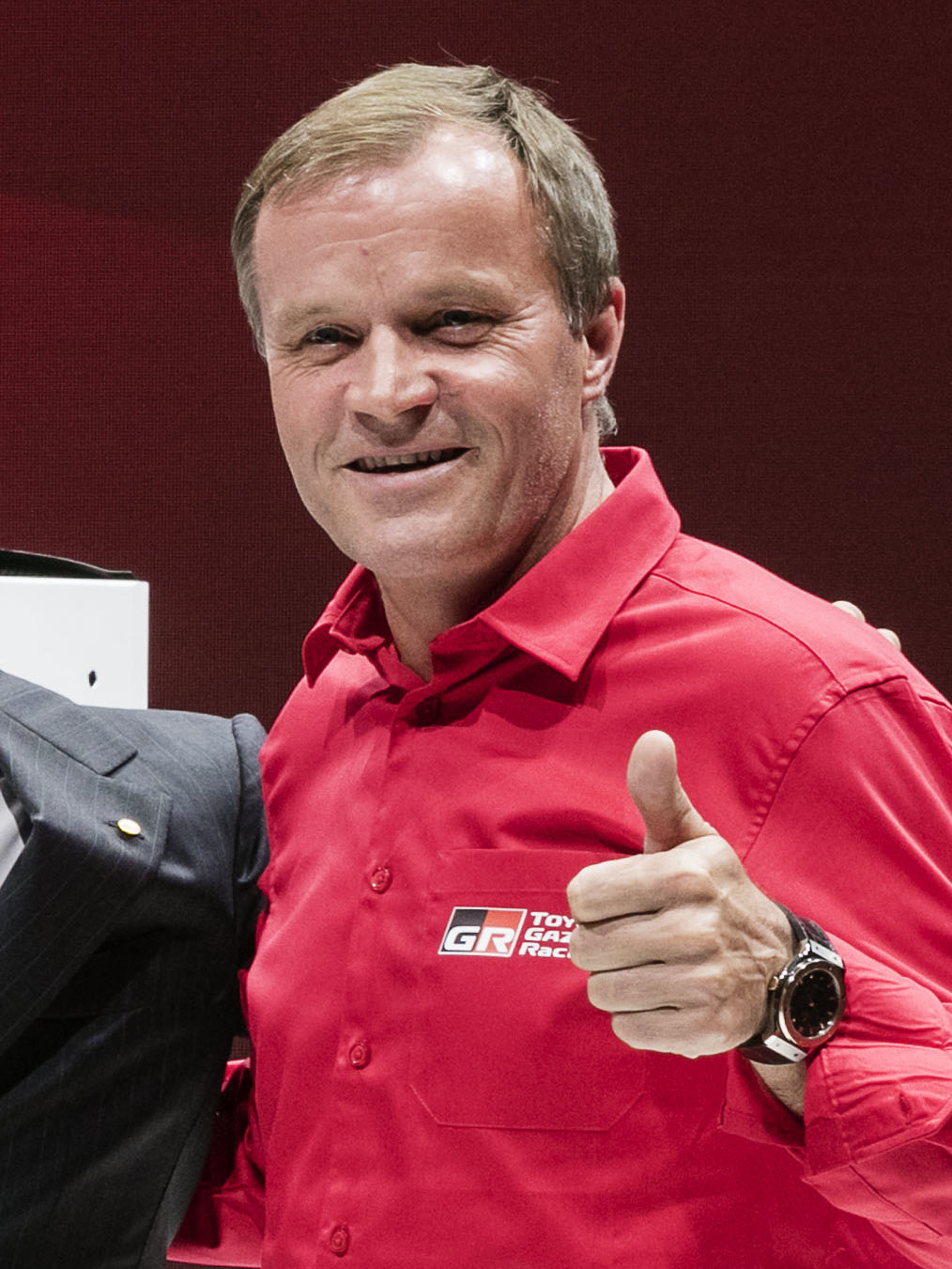
Tommi Makinen

- June 3 – James Purefoy, British actor
- June 7 – Gia Carides, Greek-Australian actress
- June 9 – Gloria Reuben, Canadian-American actress
- June 10
  - Ben Daniels, English actor
  - Vincent Perez, Swiss actor, director and photographer
- June 13
  - Kathy Burke, English actress and comedian
  - Šarūnas Marčiulionis, Lithuanian basketball player
- June 15
  - Courteney Cox, American actress
  - Michael Laudrup, Danish footballer and manager
- June 17 – Michael Gross, German swimmer
- June 18 – Uday Hussein, Iraqi Army commander (d. 2003)
- June 19 – Boris Johnson, Prime Minister of the United Kingdom 2019–2022
- June 21 – Dean Saunders, Welsh football manager and former professional footballer
- June 22
  - Dan Brown, American author
  - Miroslav Kadlec, Czech football defender
  - Nico Jalink, Dutch footballer and football manager
- June 23
  - Astrid Carolina Herrera, Venezuelan actress
  - Joss Whedon, American screenwriter
- June 24 – Günther Mader, Austrian alpine ski racer
- June 25 – Johnny Herbert, English racing driver
- June 26 – Tommi Mäkinen, Finnish rally driver
- June 30 – Alexandra, Countess of Frederiksborg, Danish aristocrat

=== July ===
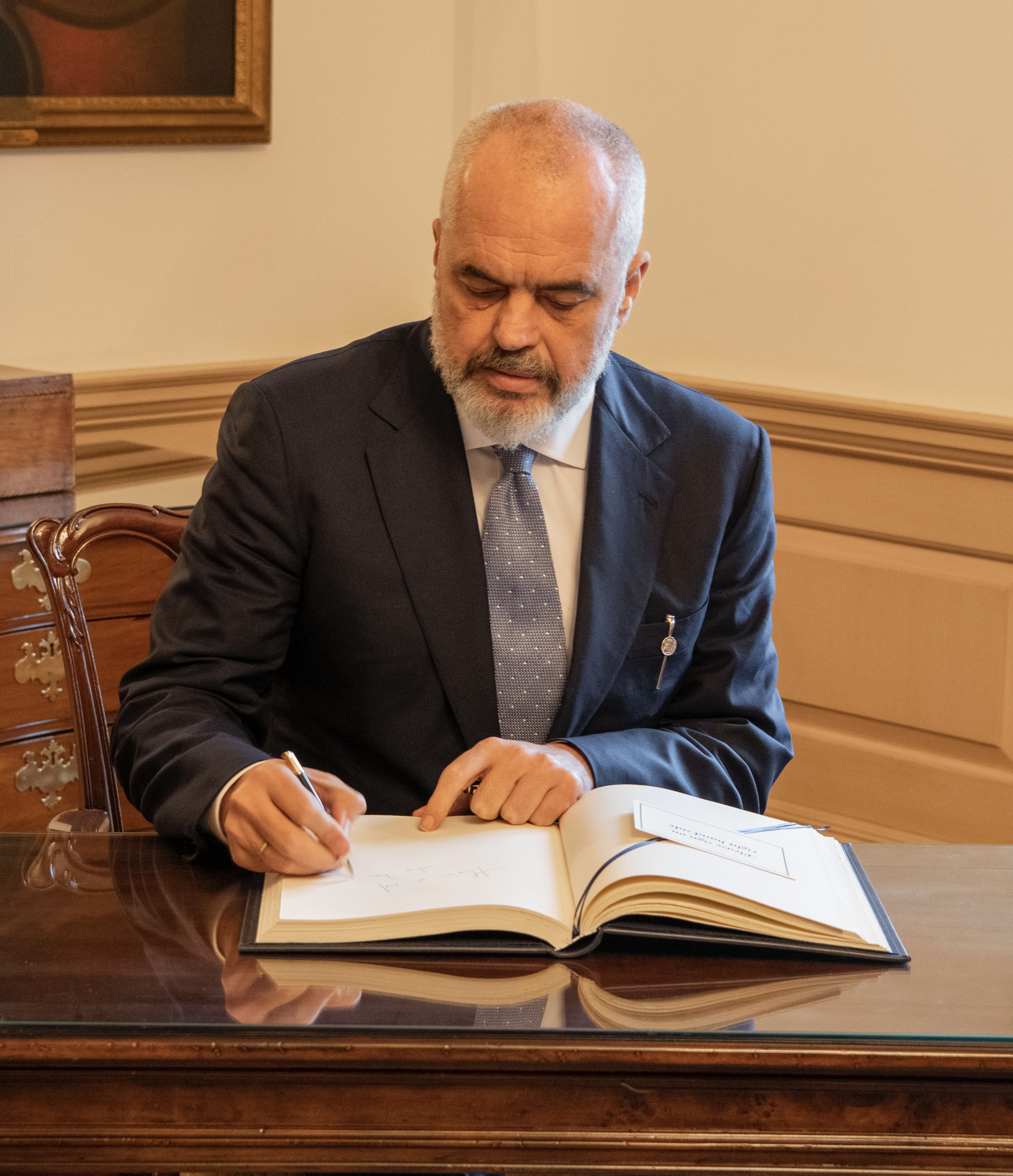
Edi Rama

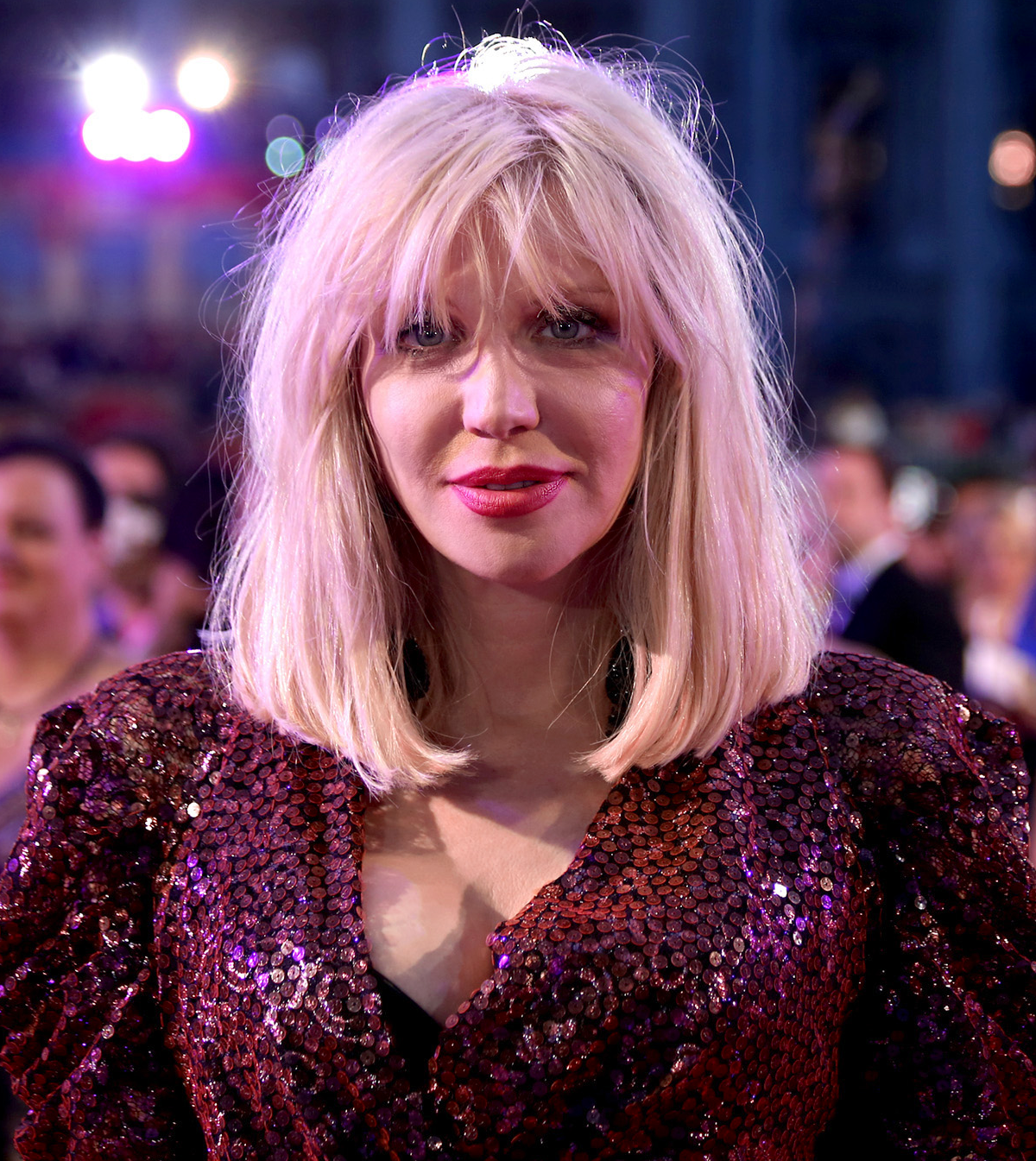
Courtney Love

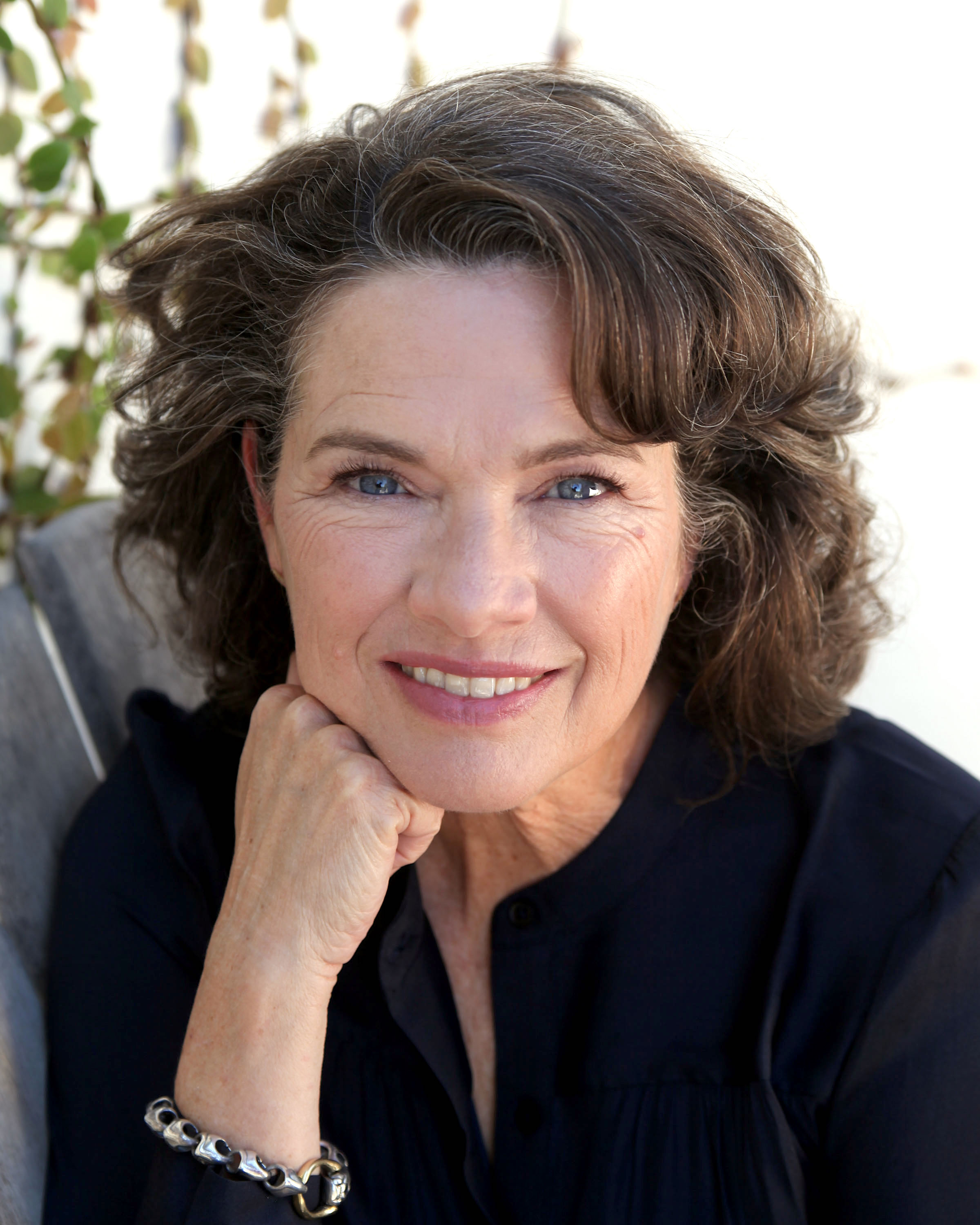
Heather Langenkamp

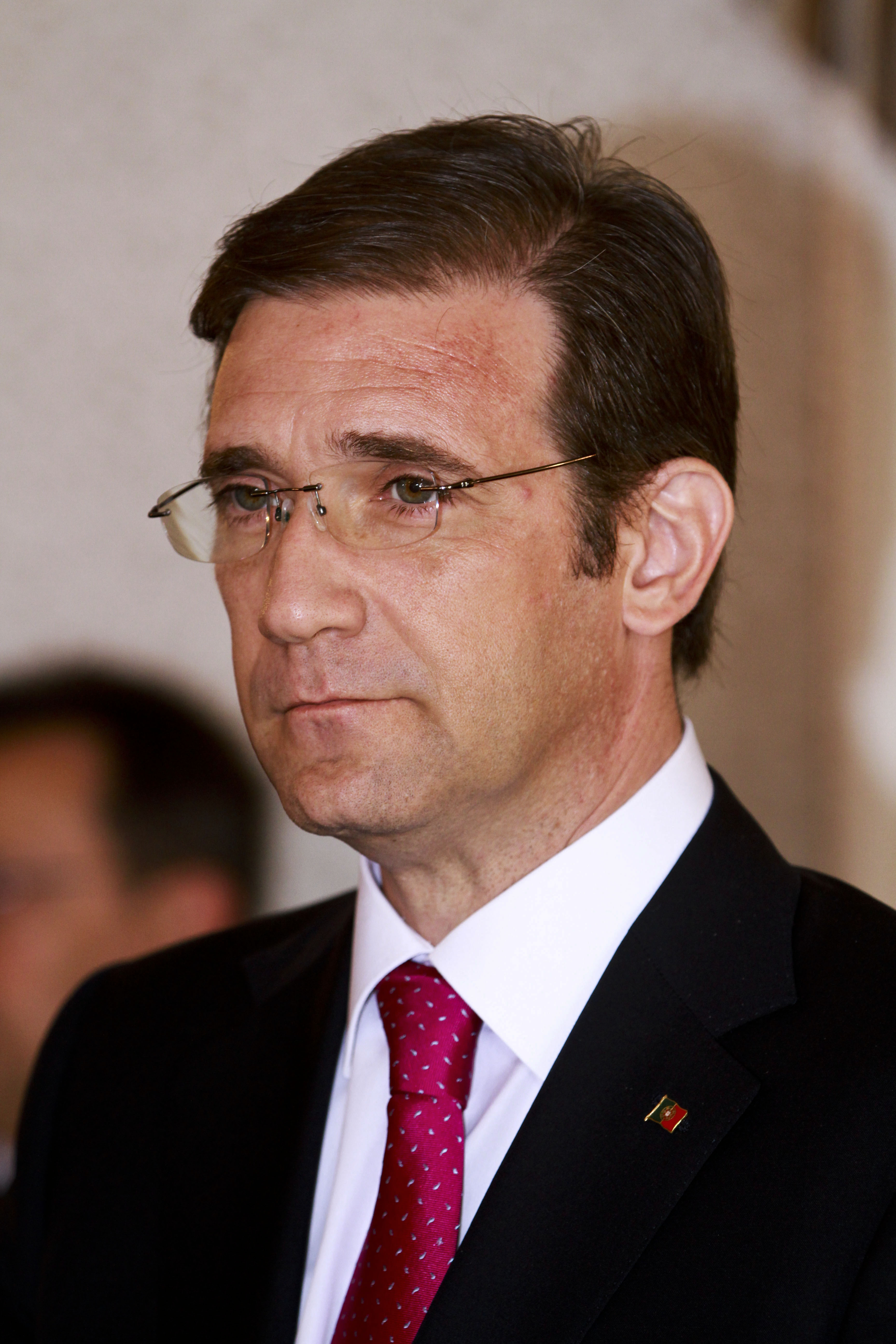
Pedro Passos Coelho

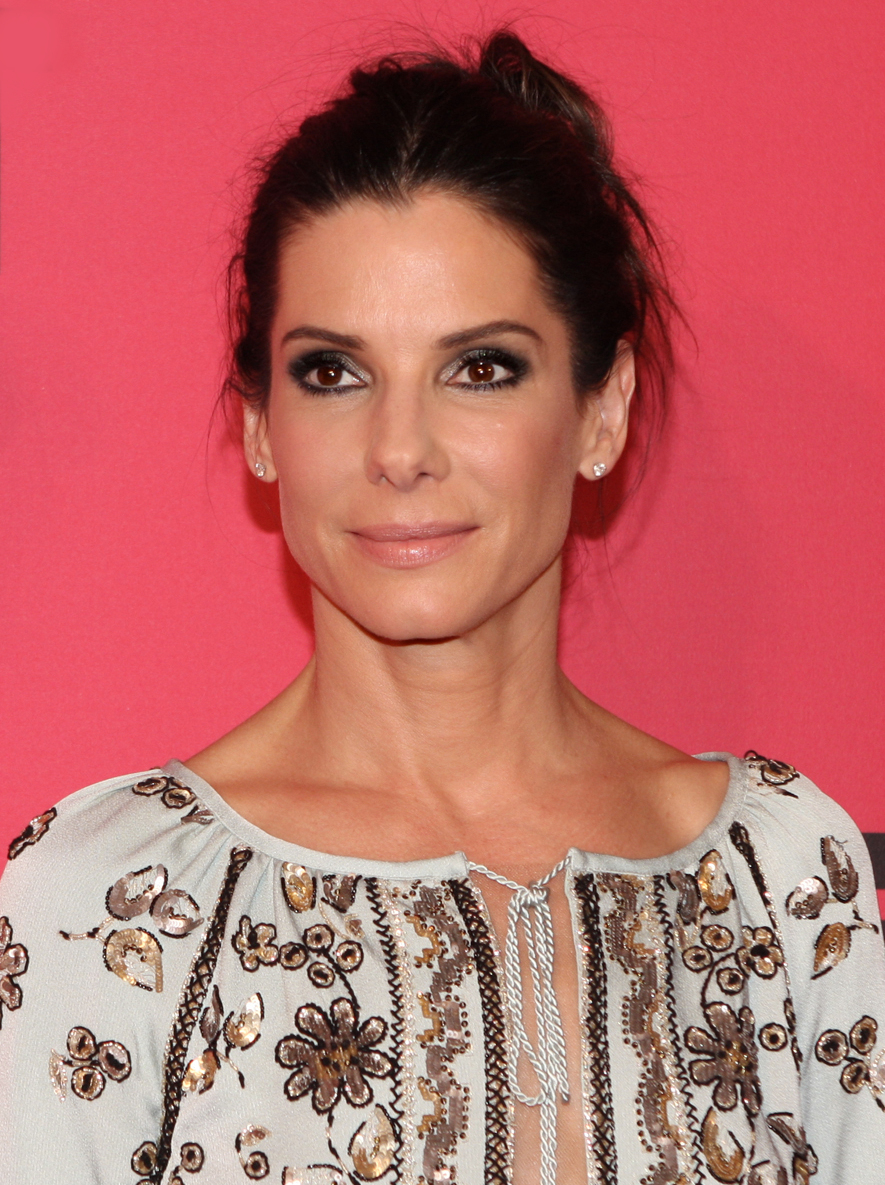
Sandra Bullock

- July 1
  - Yu Long, Chinese conductor
  - Bernard Laporte, French rugby player and coach
  - Loli Sánchez, Spanish basketball player
- July 2 – Jose and Ozzie Canseco, Cuban-born American baseball players; twin brothers
- July 3
  - Joanne Harris, English novelist
  - Aleksei Serebryakov, Russian-Canadian actor
- July 4 – Edi Rama, 33rd Prime Minister of Albania
- July 6 – Kim Jee-woon, South Korean film director and screenwriter
- July 9 – Courtney Love, American musician/actress
- July 13 – Pascal Hervé, French road racing cyclist
- July 15 – Tetsuji Hashiratani, Japanese football player and manager
- July 16 – Miguel Indurain, Spanish cyclist
- July 17 – Heather Langenkamp, American actress and businesswoman.
- July 18 – Wendy Williams, African-American talk show host
- July 19
  - Teresa Edwards, American basketball player
  - Miyeegombyn Enkhbold, Mongolian politician, prime minister 2006–7
- July 21
  - Marthen Dira Tome, Indonesian politician
- July 24
  - Barry Bonds, African-American baseball player
  - Pedro Passos Coelho, 118th Prime Minister of Portugal
- July 26
  - Sandra Bullock, American actress and film producer
  - Anne Provoost, Belgian author
- July 28 – Lori Loughlin, American actress
- July 30
  - Vivica A. Fox, American actress
  - Jürgen Klinsmann, German football player and manager
- July 31 – C.C. Catch, Dutch-born German singer

=== August ===
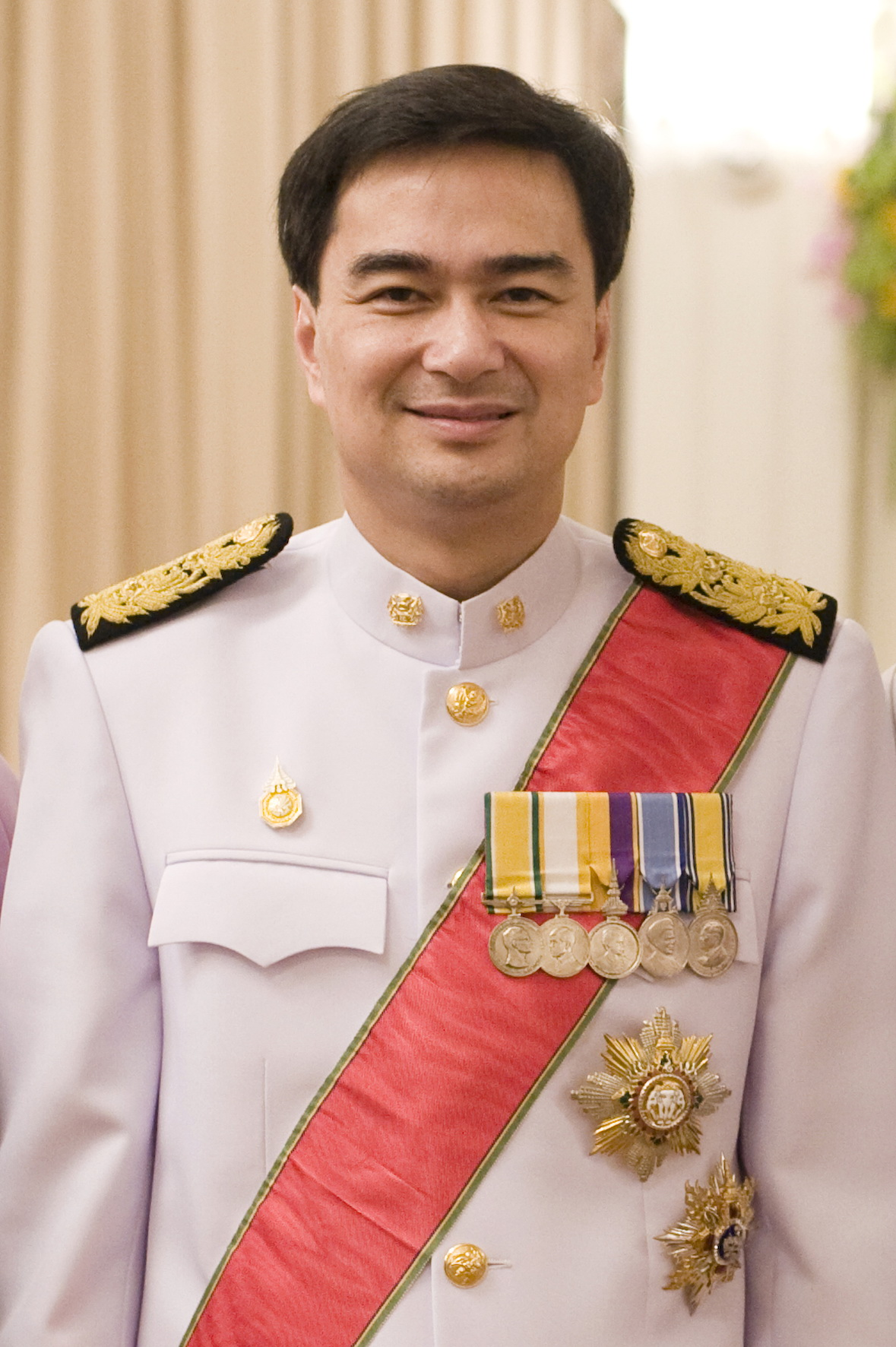
Abhisit Vejjajiva

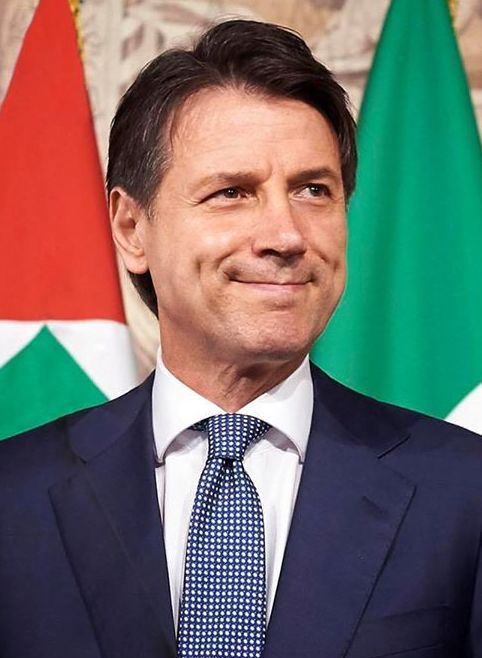
Giuseppe Conte

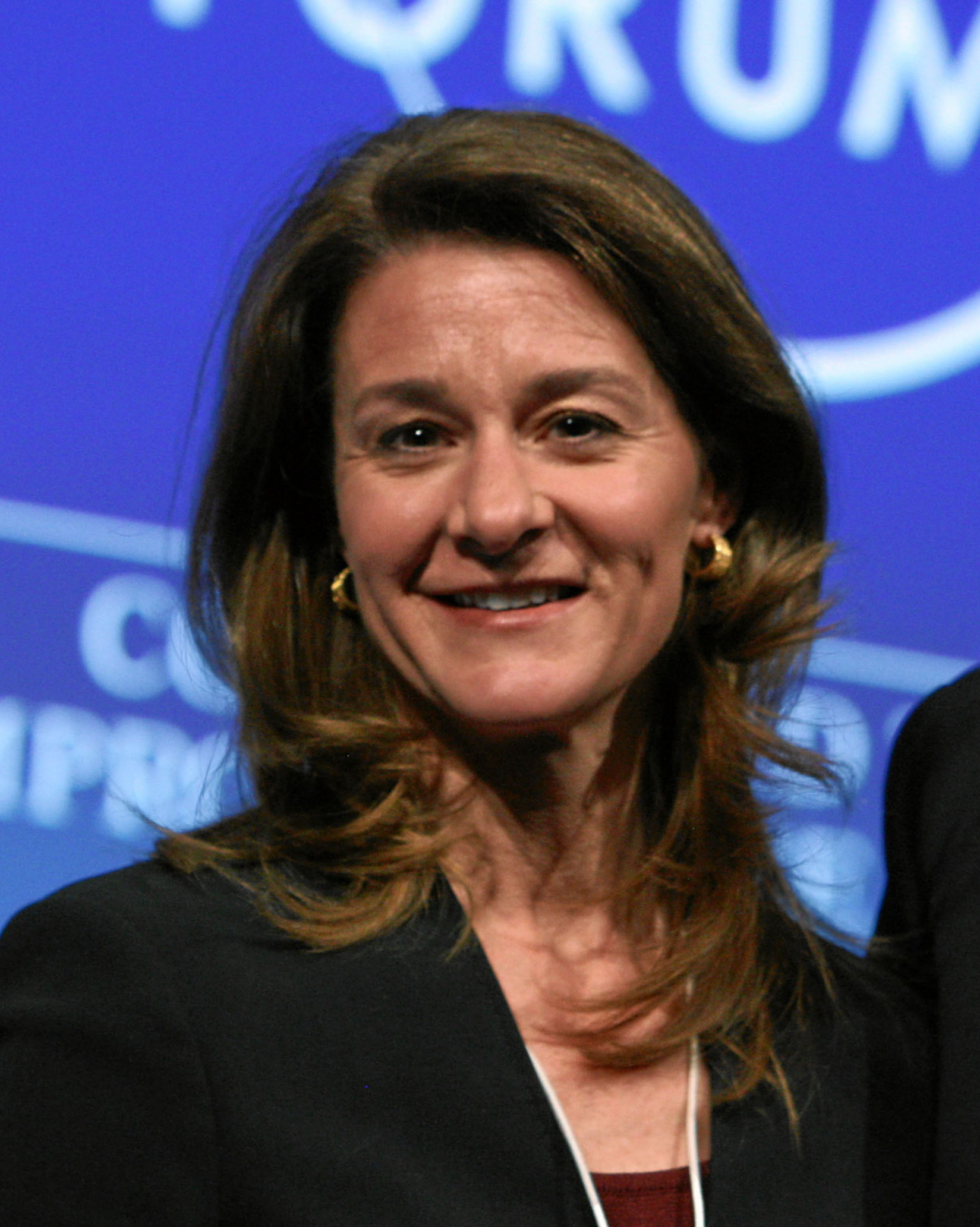
Melinda Gates

- August 1 – Natalya Shikolenko, Belarusian javelin thrower
- August 2 – Mary-Louise Parker, American actress
- August 3
  - Lucky Dube, South African reggae musician (died 2007)
  - Abhisit Vejjajiva, 27th Prime Minister of Thailand
- August 8 – Giuseppe Conte, Italian Prime Minister (2018–2021)
- August 9 - John Kiriakou, American whistleblower, author, and former CIA officer
- August 15 – Melinda Gates, American philanthropist
- August 17 – Deen Castronovo, American drummer
- August 22 – Mats Wilander, Swedish tennis player
- August 24 – Salizhan Sharipov, Russian cosmonaut and astronaut
- August 25 – Maxim Kontsevich, Russian mathematician
- August 26 – Torsten Schmitz, German boxer

=== September ===
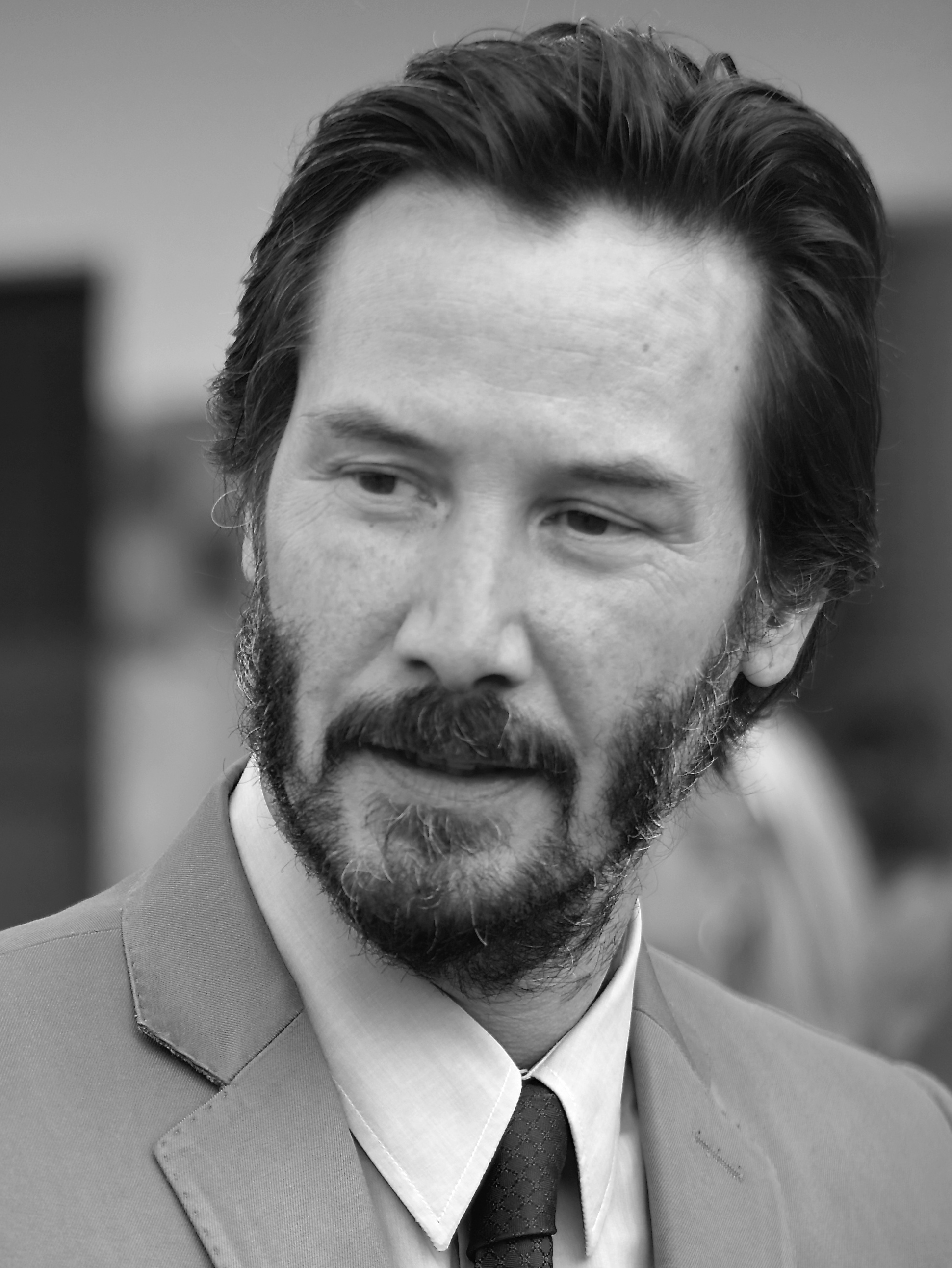
Keanu Reeves

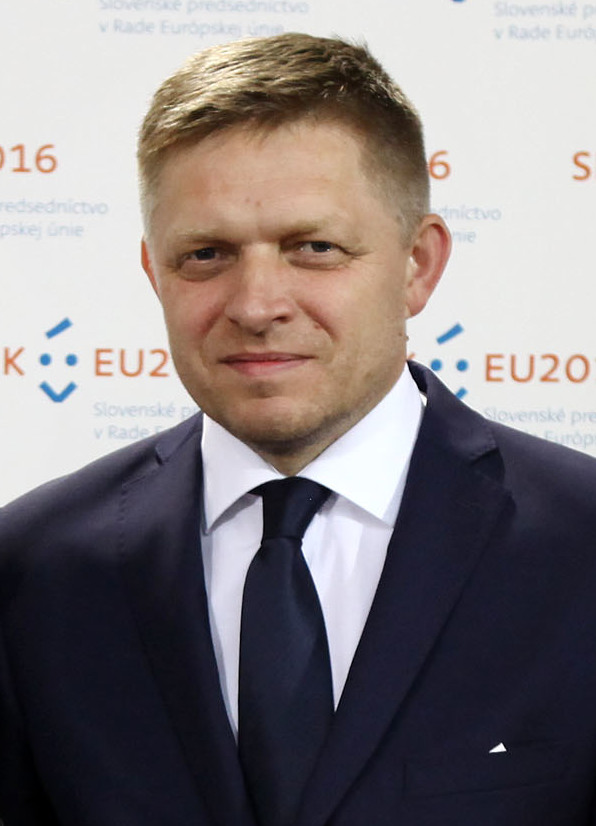
Robert Fico

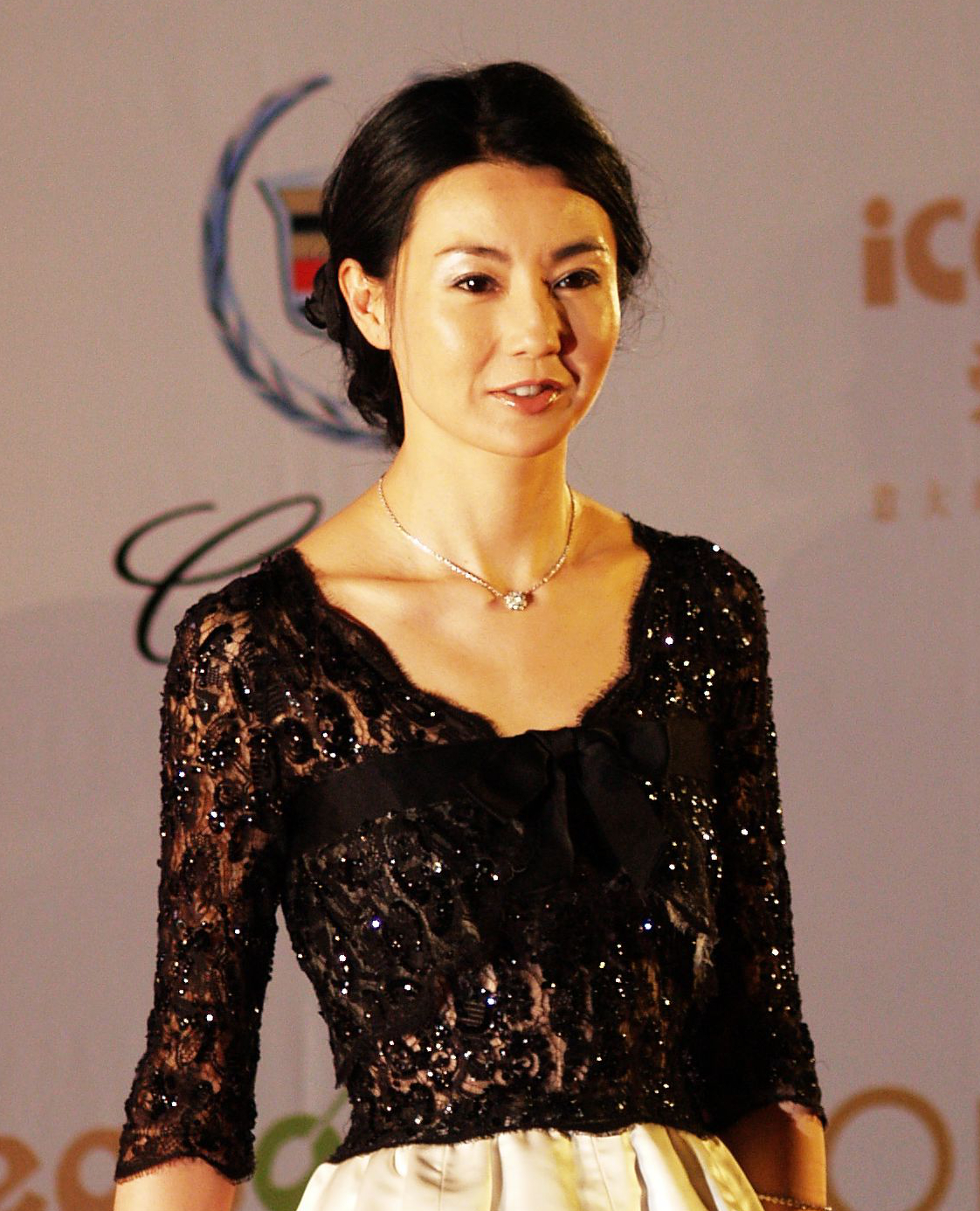
Maggie Cheung

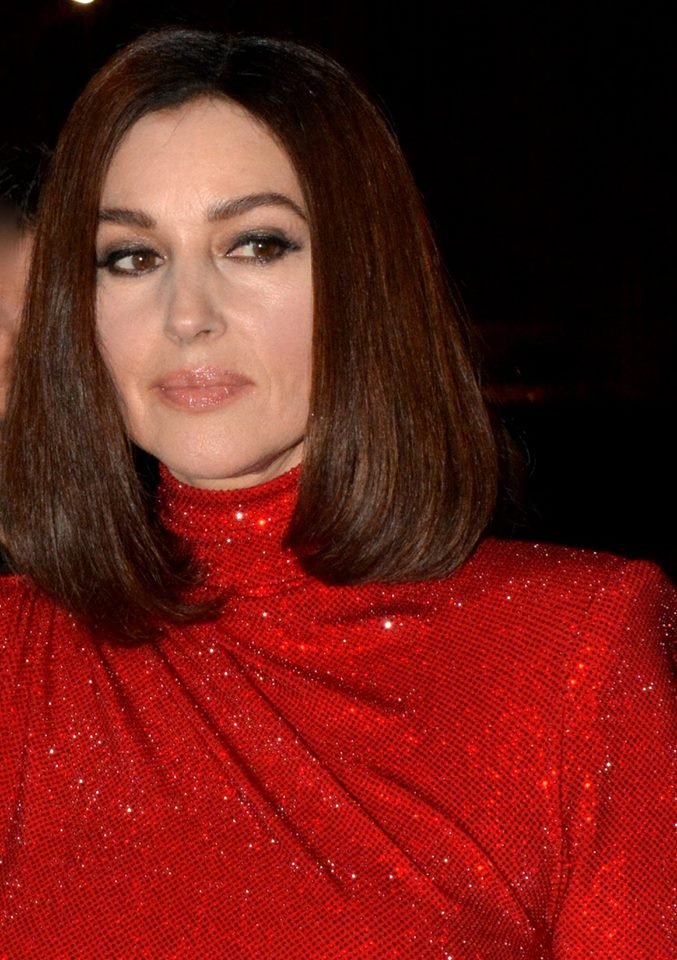
Monica Bellucci

- September 2 – Keanu Reeves, Canadian actor
- September 6 – Rosie Perez, American actress and comedian
- September 7
  - Eazy-E, American rapper and record producer (d. 1995)
  - Andy Hug, Swiss Seidokaikan karateka and kickboxer (died 2000)
- September 10
  - Raymond Cruz, American actor
  - Jack Ma, Chinese business magnate and billionaire internet entrepreneur
  - Yegor Letov, Russian singer (d. 2008)
- September 15 – Robert Fico, Prime Minister of Slovakia
- September 19
  - Yvonne Vera, Zimbabwean actress (died 2005)
  - Trisha Yearwood, American country singer
- September 20 – Maggie Cheung, Hong Kong actress
- September 21 – Jorge Drexler, Uruguayan musician
- September 23 – Josefa Idem, German-born Italian kayaker
- September 25
  - Marc Benioff, American Internet entrepreneur and philanthropist
  - Carlos Ruiz Zafón, Spanish novelist (died 2020)
- September 27 – Stephan Jenkins, American singer and rock musician (Third Eye Blind)
- September 28
  - Gregoria Díaz, Venezuelan journalist (died 2023)
  - Janeane Garofalo, American actress and comedian
- September 30 – Kwame Raoul, American attorney and politician, 42nd Attorney General of Illinois

=== October ===
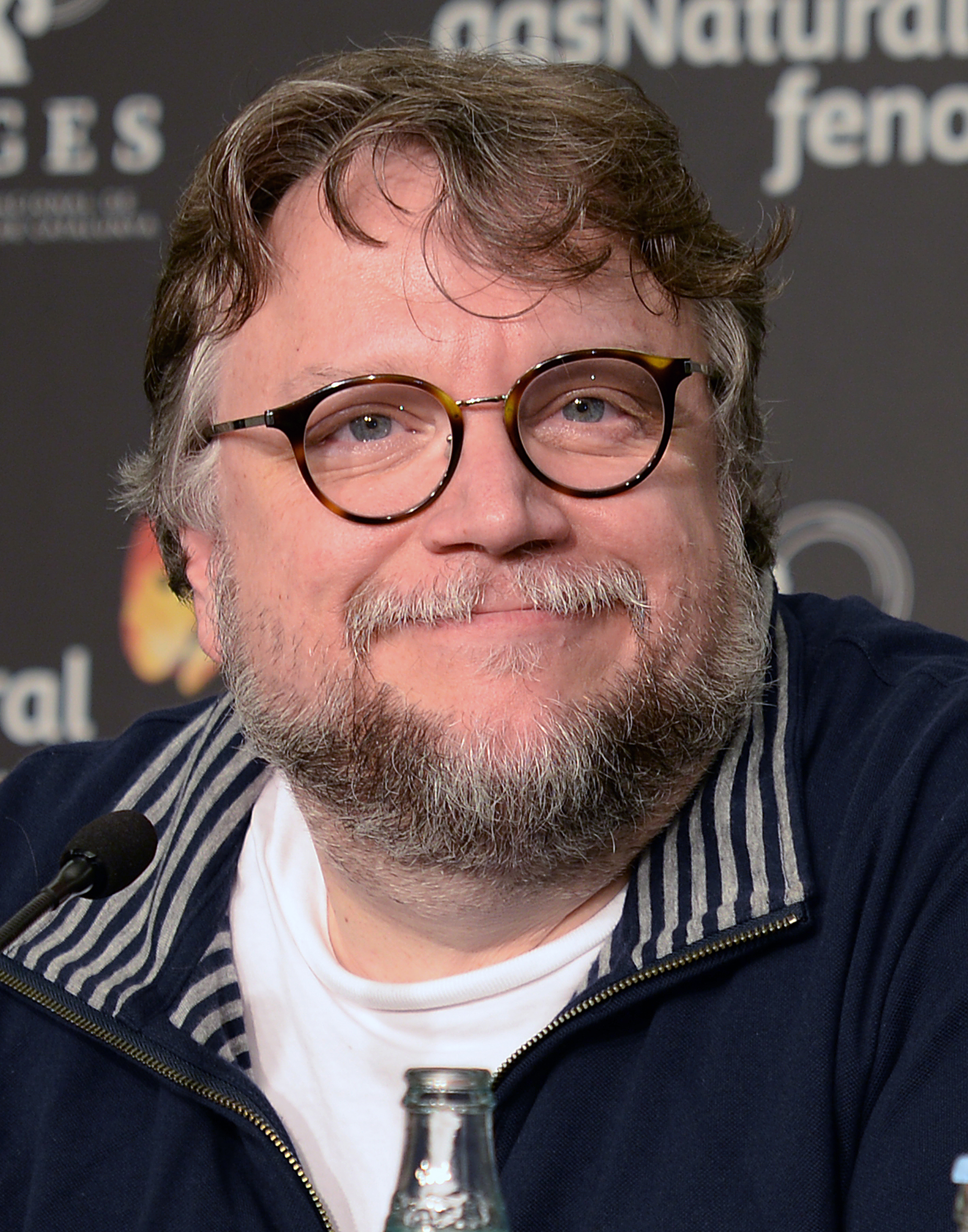
Guillermo del Toro

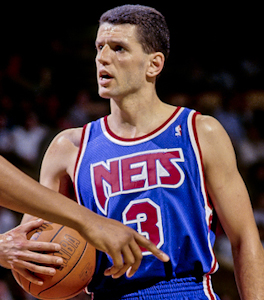
Dražen Petrović

- October 2 – Makharbek Khadartsev, Russian free-style wrestler
- October 3 – Clive Owen, English actor
- October 4 – Yvonne Murray, Scottish athlete
- October 6 – Tom Jager, American swimmer
- October 9
  - Guillermo del Toro, Mexican film director
  - Martín Jaite, Argentine tennis player
- October 10 – Maxi Gnauck, German gymnast
- October 20 – Kamala Harris, politician and attorney, 49th vice president of the United States
- October 22
  - Dražen Petrović, Croatian basketball player (died 1993)
  - Paul McStay, Scottish footballer
- October 25 – Nicole Seibert, German singer, Eurovision Song Contest 1982 winner
- October 26 – Elisabeta Lipă, Romanian rower
- October 27 – Mary T. Meagher, American swimmer
- October 31 – Marco van Basten, Dutch footballer and manager

=== November ===
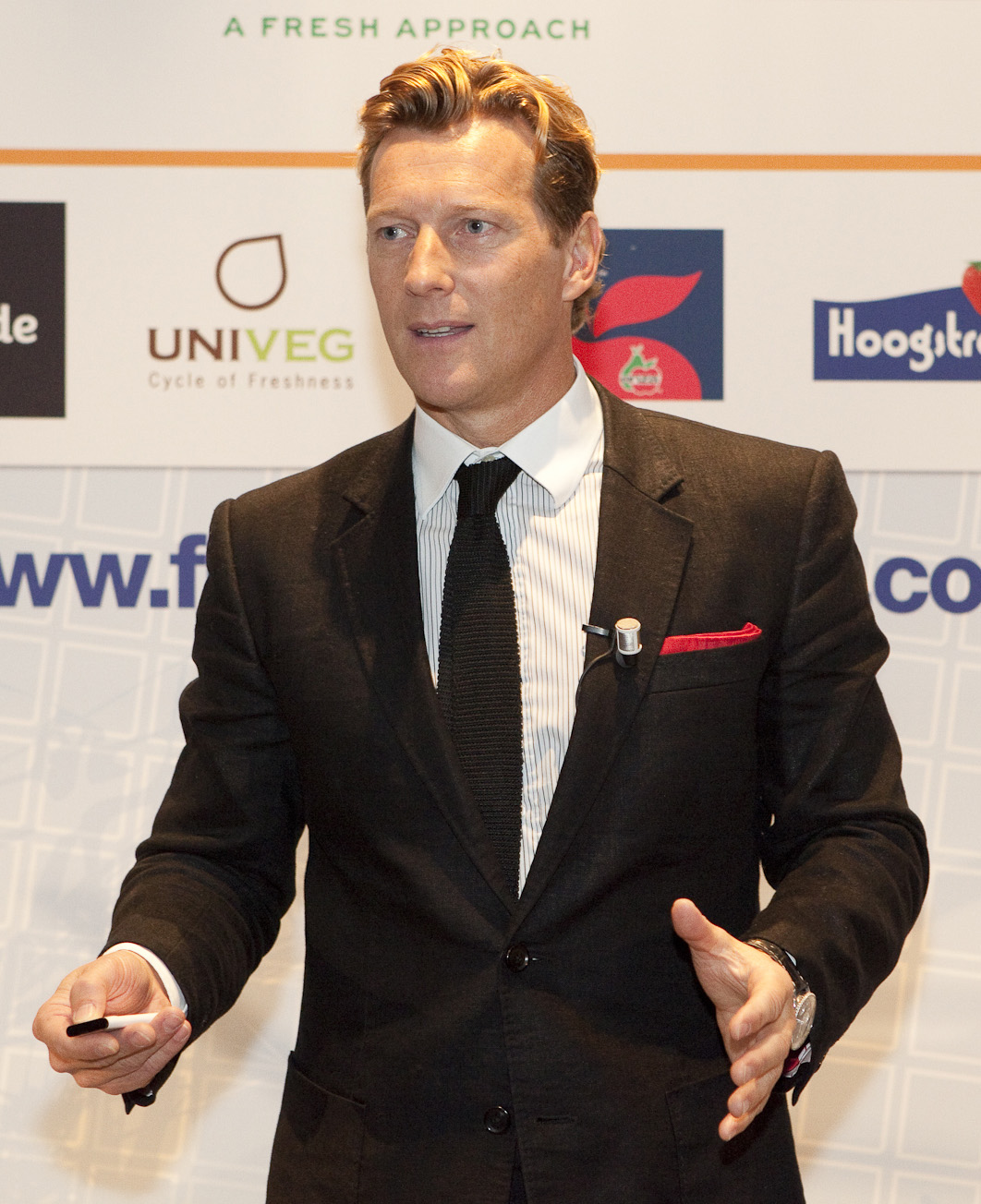
Magnús Scheving

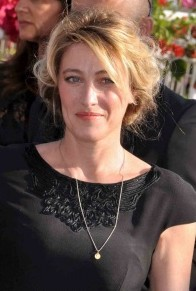
Valeria Bruni Tedeschi

- November 3 – Paprika Steen, Danish actress
- November 11 – Calista Flockhart, American actress
- November 12 – Michael Kremer, American development economist, recipient of the Nobel Memorial Prize in Economic Sciences
- November 16
  - Diana Krall, Canadian jazz pianist and singer
  - Valeria Bruni Tedeschi, Italian-French actress
- November 20 – Doug Ford, 26th Premier of Ontario
- November 22 – Apetor, Norwegian YouTuber (d. 2021)
- November 23 – Erika Buenfil, Mexican actress and singer
- November 24 – Conleth Hill, Irish actor
- November 26 – Vreni Schneider, Swiss alpine skier
- November 27 – Ronit Elkabetz, Israeli actress, writer and filmmaker (died 2016)
- November 28
  - Giorgi Bagaturov, Georgian-Armenian chess grandmaster
  - Oscar Muñoz, Colombian wrestler
- November 29 – Don Cheadle, African-American actor

=== December ===
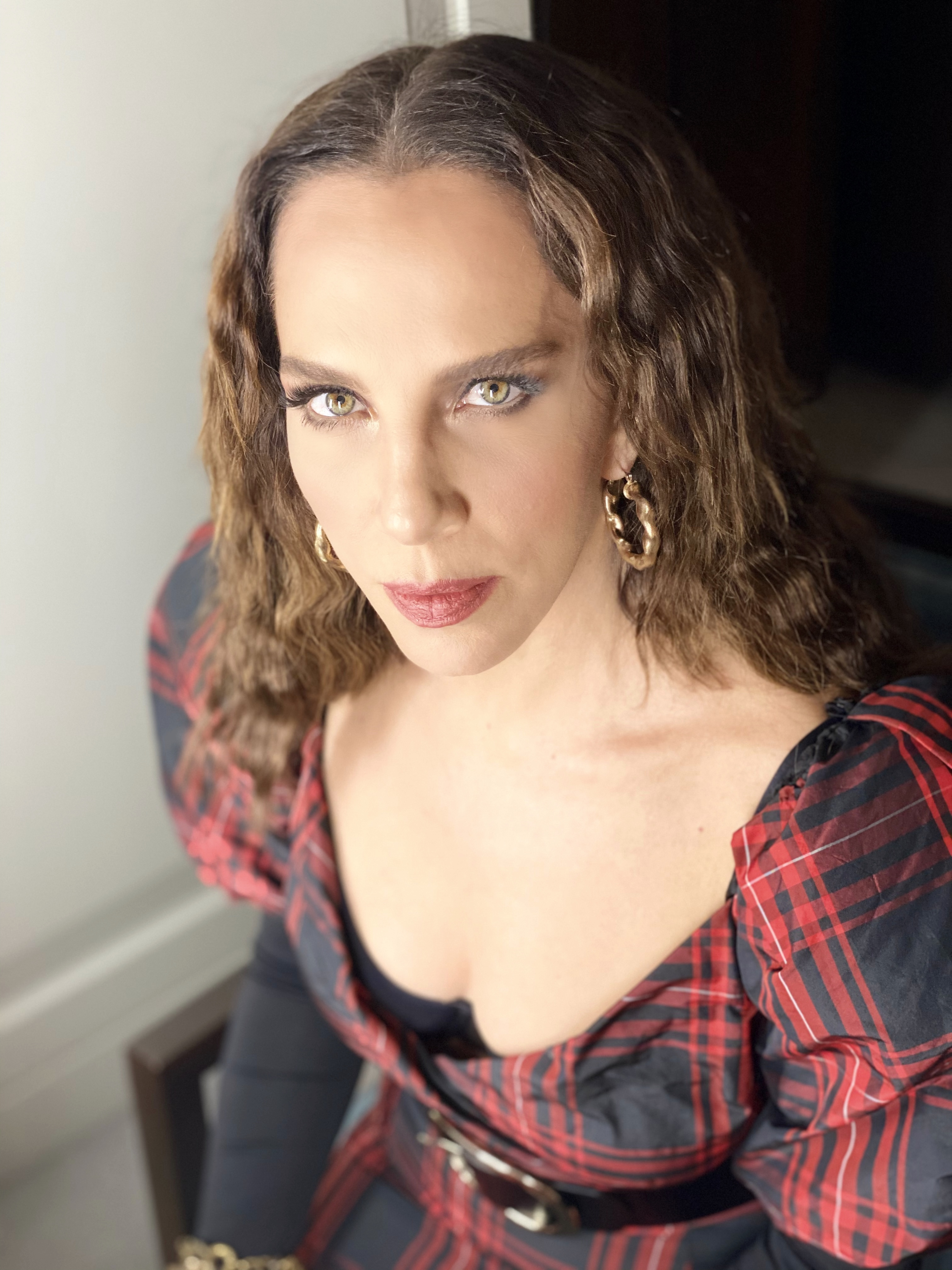
Sertab Erener

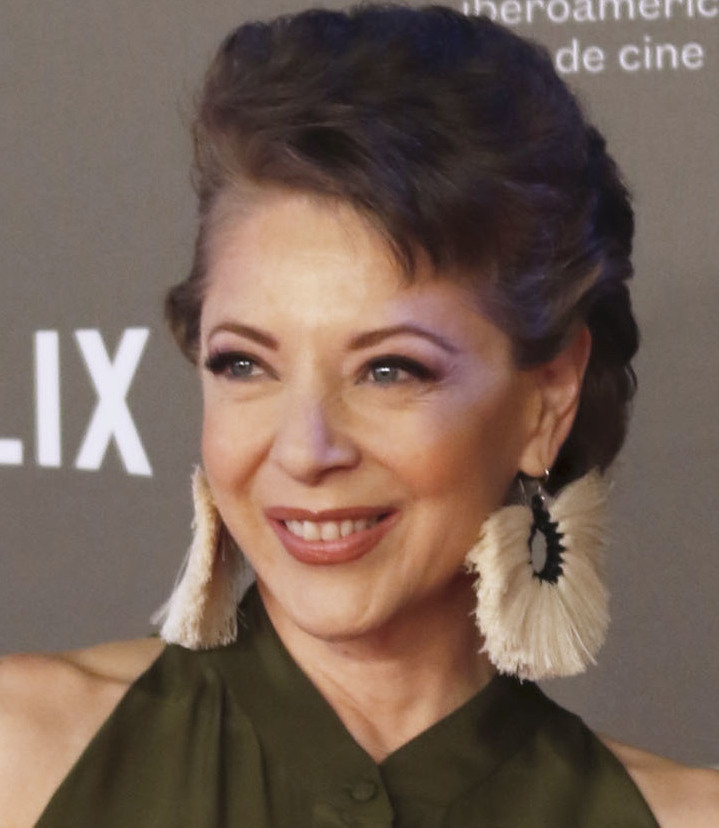
Edith González

- December 1 – Salvatore Schillaci, Italian footballer (d. 2024)
- December 4
  - Sertab Erener, Turkish singer-songwriter, Eurovision Song Contest 2003 winner
  - Marisa Tomei, American actress
- December 8 – Teri Hatcher, American actress, writer, presenter and singer
- December 9 – Paul Landers, German rock musician (Rammstein)
- December 10 – Edith González, Mexican actress (died 2019)
- December 13 – Hide, Japanese musician (died 1998)
- December 16 – Heike Drechsler, German track-and-field athlete
- December 18
  - Stone Cold Steve Austin, American professional wrestler and actor
  - Pierre Nkurunziza, 8th President of Burundi (died 2020)
- December 19 – Arvydas Sabonis, Lithuanian basketball player
- December 23 – Eddie Vedder, American rock singer (Pearl Jam)
- December 30 – Md. Anwarul Islam, Bangladeshi politician

== Deaths ==
=== January ===
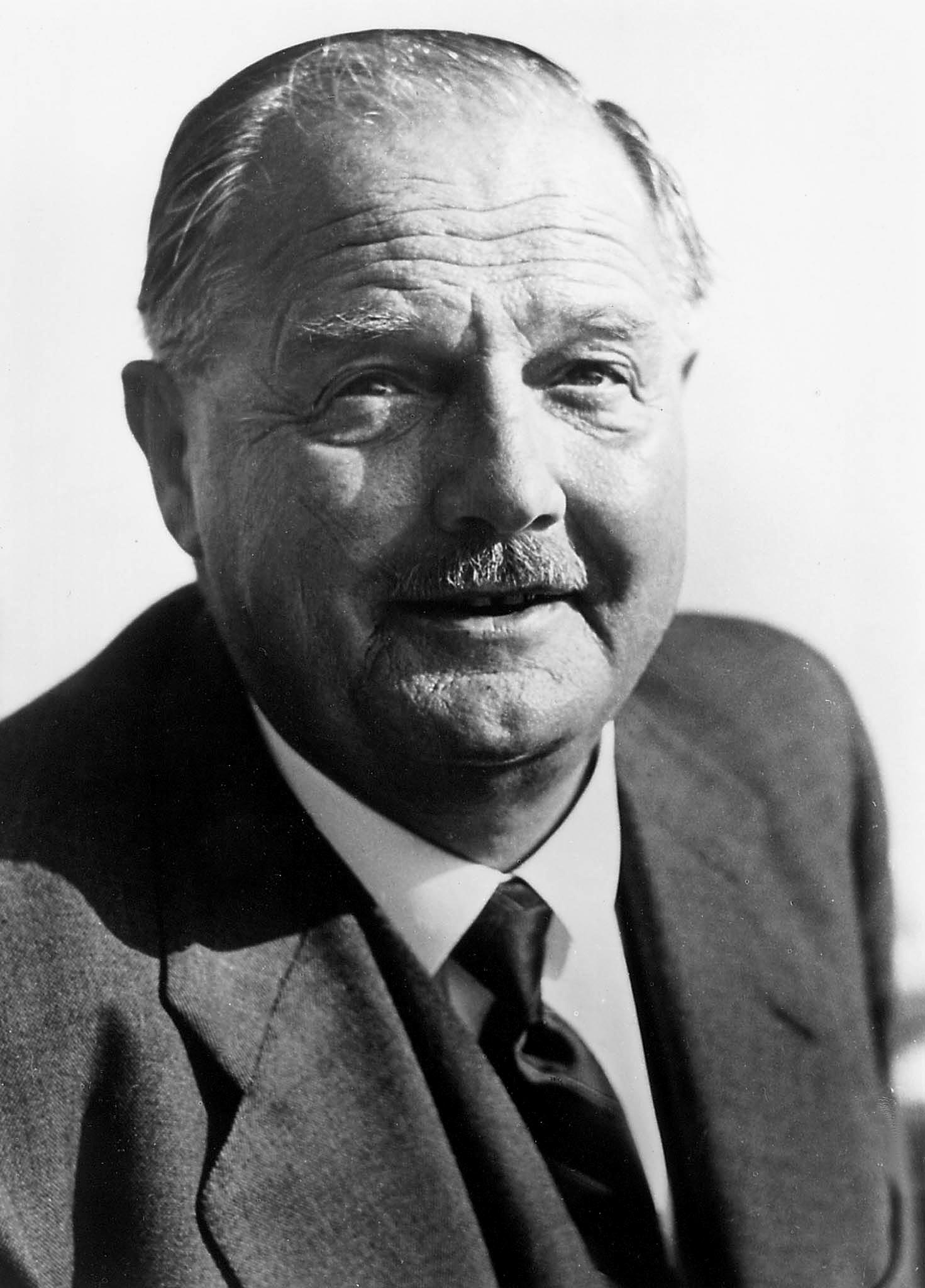
Julius Raab

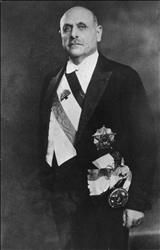
Bechara El Khoury

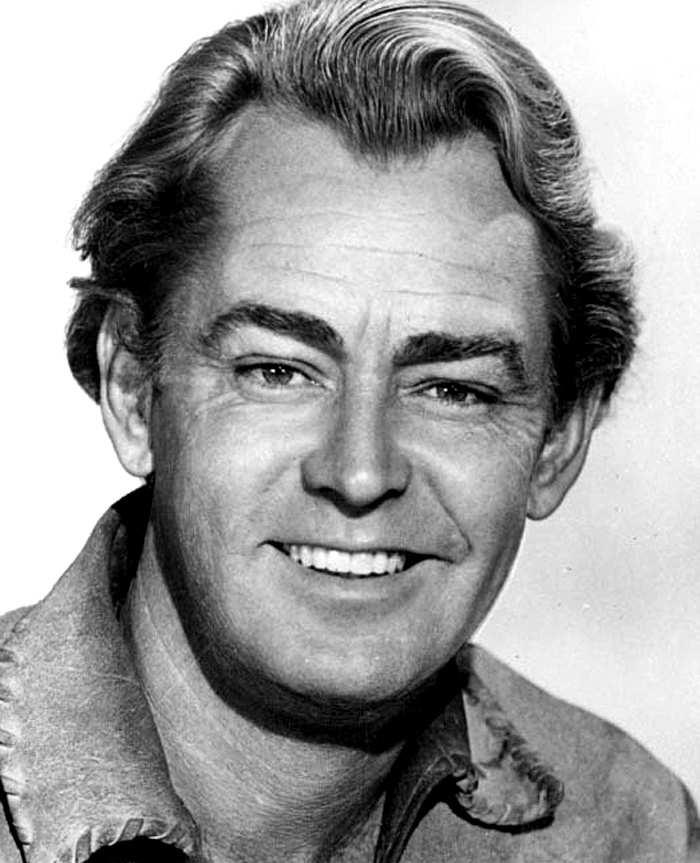
Alan Ladd

- January 4 – Andreas Hermes, German agricultural scientist and politician (born 1878)
- January 7 – Reg Parnell, British racing driver and manager (born 1911)
- January 8 – Julius Raab, Austrian politician, 14th Chancellor of Austria (born 1891)
- January 9 – Halide Edib Adıvar, Turkish novelist (born 1884)
- January 11 – Bechara El Khoury, 2nd Prime Minister of Lebanon and 6th President of Lebanon (born 1890)
- January 15
  - Tawfiq Canaan, Palestinian doctor (born 1882)
  - Jack Teagarden, American jazz trombonist (born 1905)
- January 17 – T. H. White, English writer (born 1906)
- January 21 – Joseph Schildkraut, Austrian actor (born 1896)
- January 22 – Marc Blitzstein, American composer (born 1905)
- January 23 – Lucila Gamero de Medina, Honduranian novelist (born 1873)
- January 29
  - Adolfo Diaz Recinos, 2-time President of Nicaragua (born 1875)
  - Alan Ladd, American actor (born 1913)
- January 31 – Kanysh Satbayev, Kazakh academician and geologist (born 1899)

=== February ===
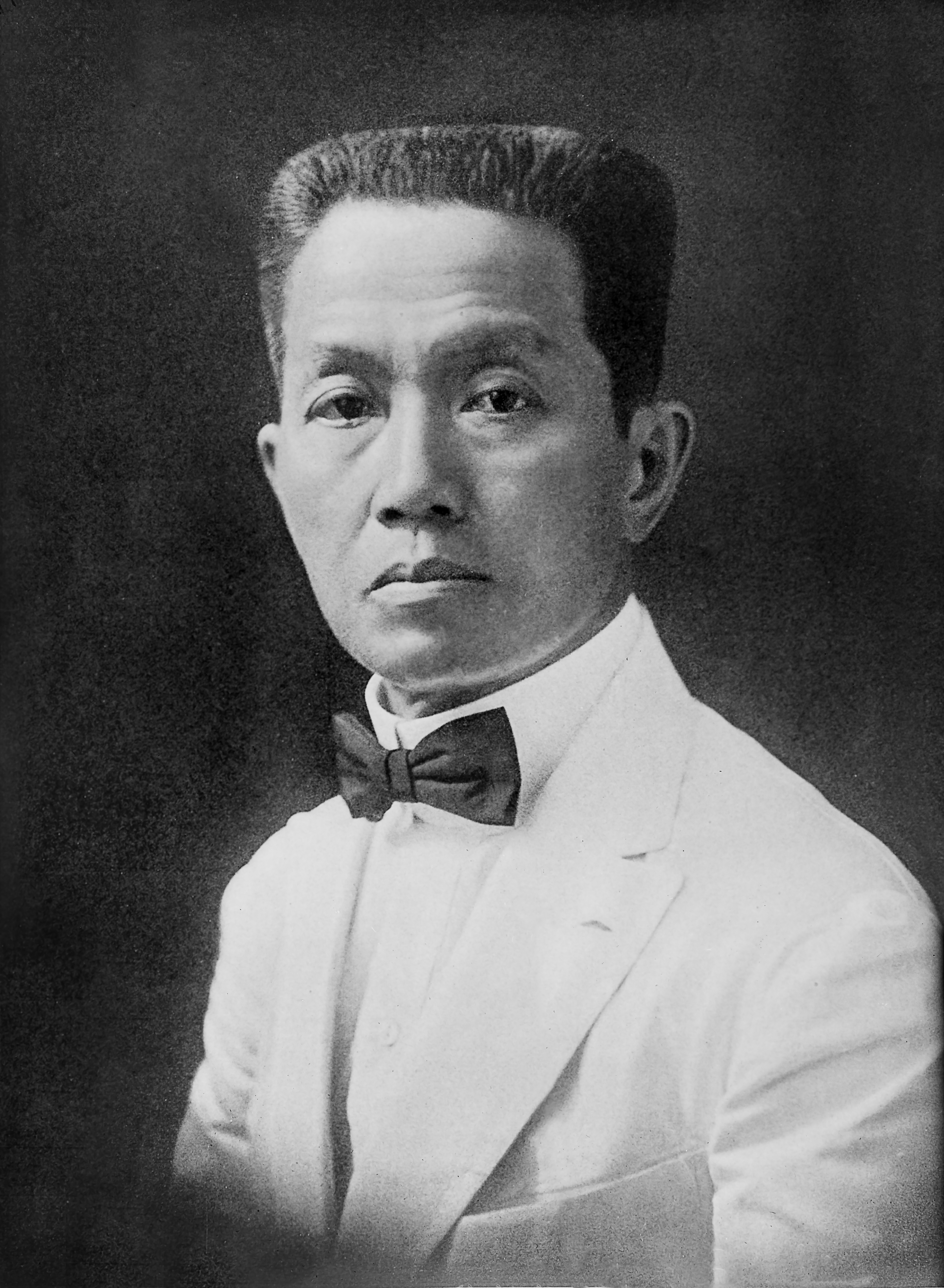
Emilio Aguinaldo

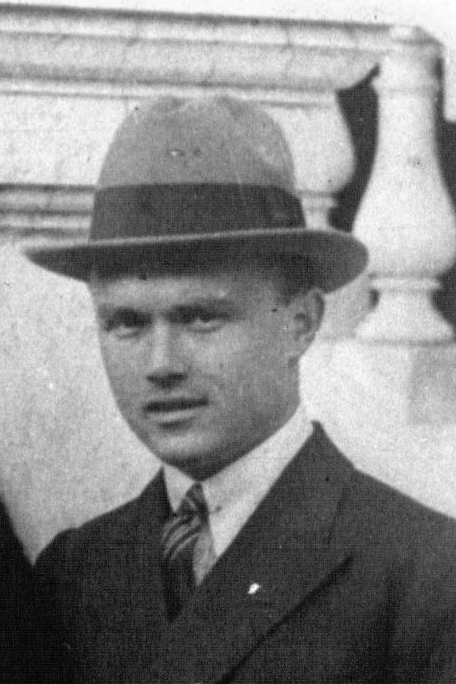
Sofoklis Venizelos

- February 3
  - Infante Alfonso, Duke of Calabria (born 1901)
  - Giuseppe Amato, Italian film producer, director and screenwriter (born 1899)
- February 5 – Matilde Moisant, American pilot (born 1878)
- February 6 – Emilio Aguinaldo, Filipino general and 1st President of the Philippines (born 1869)
- February 7 – Sofoklis Venizelos, Greek politician, three-time Prime Minister of Greece (born 1894)
- February 8 – Ernst Kretschmer, German psychiatrist (born 1888)
- February 10 – Eugen Sänger, Austrian aerospace engineer (born 1905)
- February 12 – Gerald Gardner, English polymath, founder of Wiccan religion (born 1884)
- February 13 – Paulino Alcántara, Filipino-Spanish footballer (born 1896)
- February 15 – Reginald Garrigou-Lagrange, French theologian (born 1877)
- February 18 – Joseph-Armand Bombardier, Canadian inventor of the snowmobile and founder of Bombardier Inc. (born 1907)
- February 25
  - Alexander Archipenko, Ukrainian-American sculptor (born 1887)
  - Mariano Jesús Cuenco, Filipino politician and writer (born 1888)
  - Grace Metalious, American writer (born 1924)
- February 27 – Orry-Kelly, Australian-born costume designer (born 1897)

=== March ===
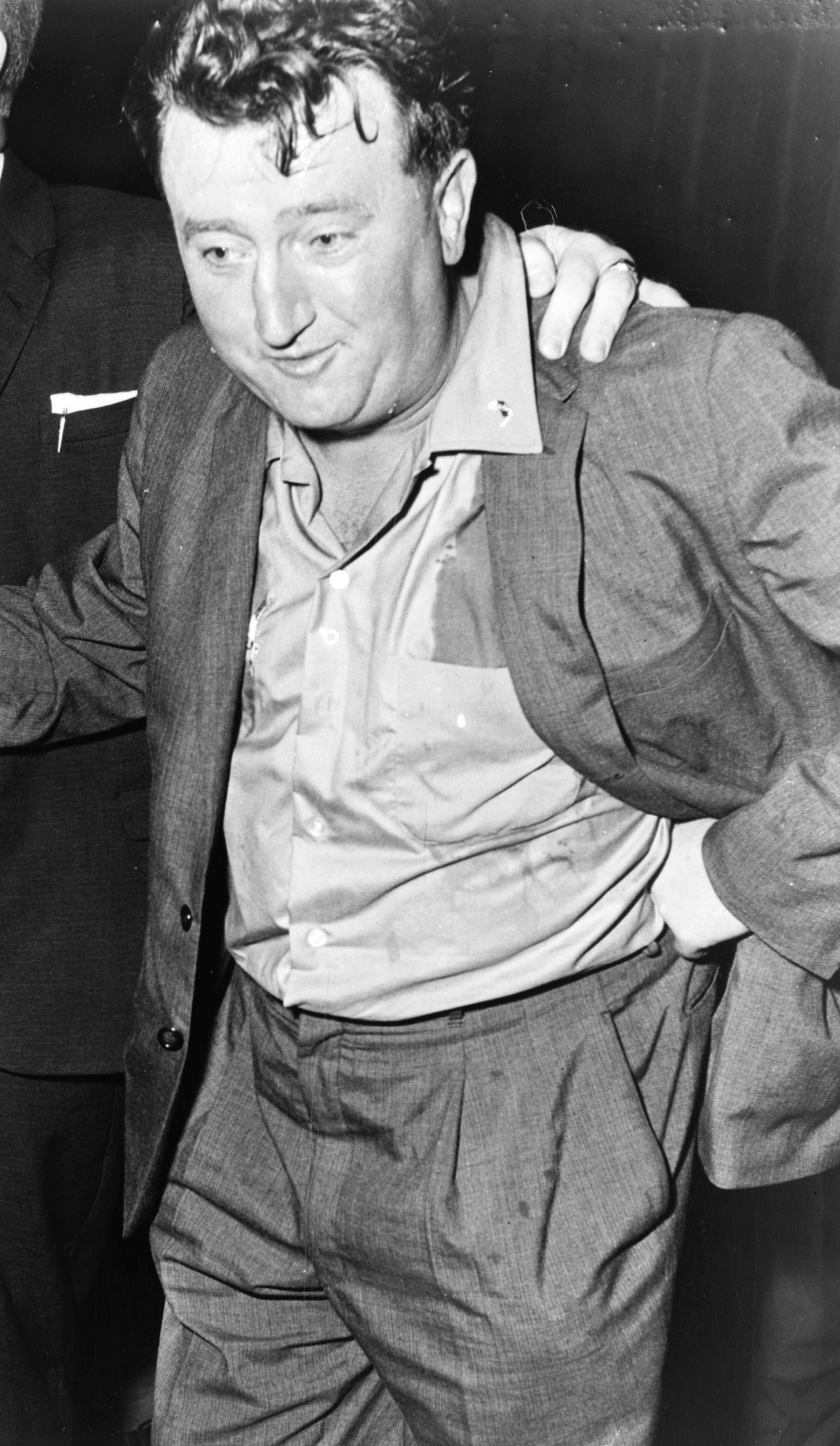
Brendan Behan

- March 6 – King Paul of Greece (born 1901)
- March 9 – Paul von Lettow-Vorbeck, German general (born 1870)
- March 12 – Abbās al-Aqqād, Egyptian journalist (born 1889)
- March 18
  - Sigfrid Edström, Swedish industrialist, 4th President of the International Olympic Committee (born 1870)
  - Norbert Wiener, American mathematician (born 1894)
- March 19 – Leo Maximilian Baginski, German entrepreneur (born 1891)
- March 20 – Brendan Behan, Irish poet and writer (born 1923)
- March 23 – Peter Lorre, Hungarian-born American actor (born 1904)
- March 25 – Alfredo Bigatti, Argentine sculptor (born 1898)
- March 30
  - Birinchi Kumar Barua, Indian folklorist (born 1908)
  - Nella Larsen, American novelist (born 1891)

=== April ===
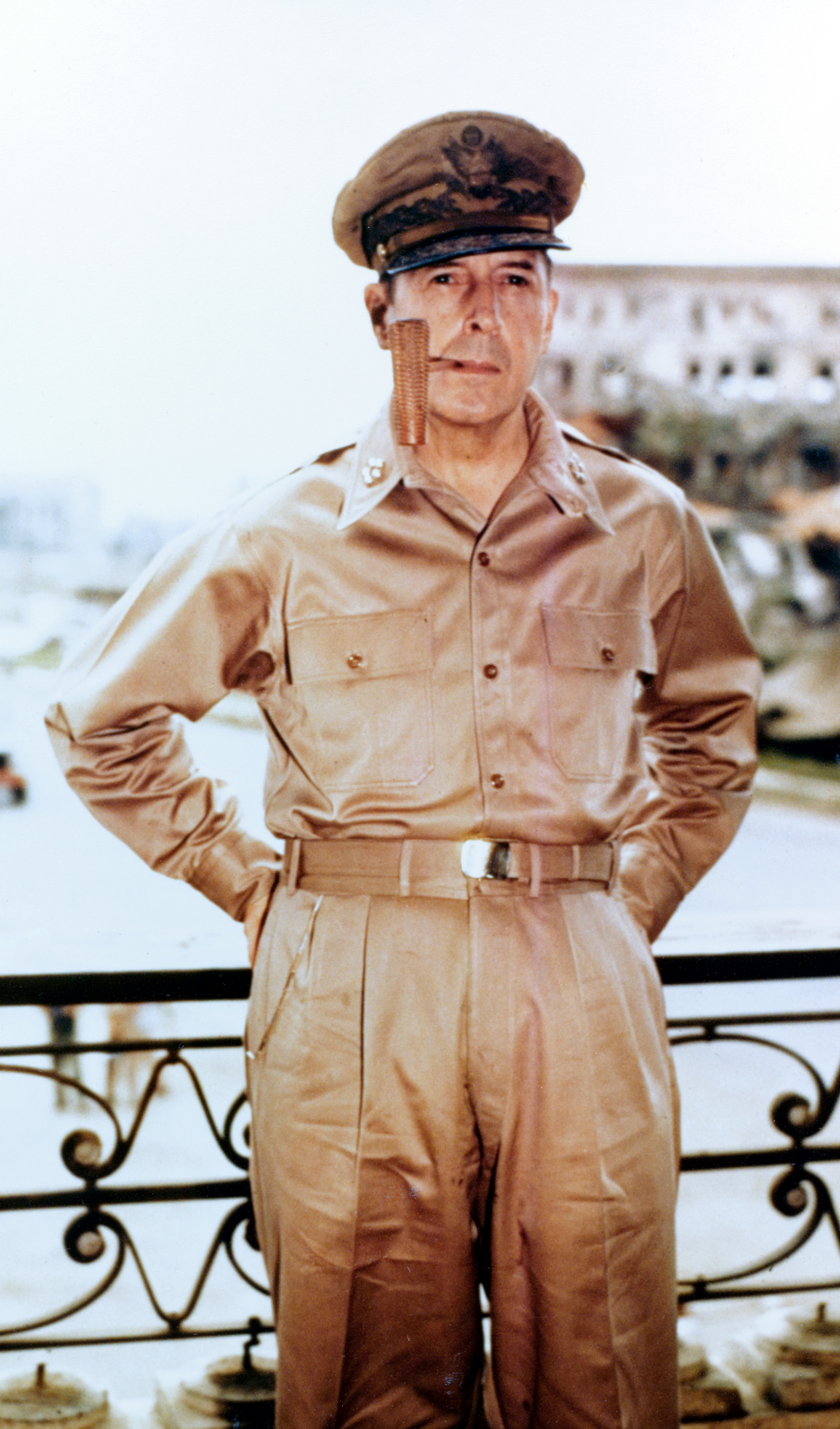
Douglas MacArthur

- April 1 – Božidar Kunc, Yugoslav composer (born 1903)
- April 3 – Franz Joseph, Prince of Hohenzollern-Emden (born 1891)
- April 5 – Douglas MacArthur, U.S. Army general, Supreme Allied Commander in Japan after World War II (born 1880)
- April 6 – Jigme Palden Dorji, 1st Prime Minister of Bhutan (born 1919; assassinated)
- April 13 – Veit Harlan, German film director (born 1899)
- April 14
  - Tatyana Afanasyeva, Soviet mathematician and physicist (born 1876)
  - Rachel Carson, American biologist and environmental writer (born 1907)
- April 18
  - Fumio Asakura, Japanese sculptor (born 1883)
  - Ben Hecht, American screenwriter (born 1894)
- April 20
  - Dimitar Ganev, Bulgarian communist politician, head of the State (born 1898)
  - August Sander, German photographer (born 1876)
- April 21 – Bharathidasan, Indian Tamil poet and rationalist (born 1891)
- April 24 – Gerhard Domagk, German bacteriologist, recipient of the Nobel Prize in Physiology or Medicine (declined) (born 1895)
- April 29 – Wenceslao Fernández Flórez, Spanish journalist and novelist (born 1885)

=== May ===
- May 2 – Nancy Astor, Viscountess Astor, American-born British politician (born 1879)
- May 6 – José Maza Fernández, Chilean politician, lawyer and diplomat (born 1889)
- May 8 – Kichisaburō Nomura, Japanese admiral and diplomat (born 1877)
- May 10 – Carol Haney, American dancer and actress (born 1924)
- May 13 – Diana Wynyard, English actress (born 1906)
- May 21 – James Franck, German-born physicist, Nobel Prize laureate (born 1882)
- May 26 – Ruben Oskar Auervaara, Finnish fraudster (born 1906)
- May 27 – Jawaharlal Nehru, Indian politician, 1st Prime Minister of India (born 1889)
- May 30 – Leó Szilárd, Hungarian-born American physicist (born 1898)

=== June ===
Carlos Quintanilla

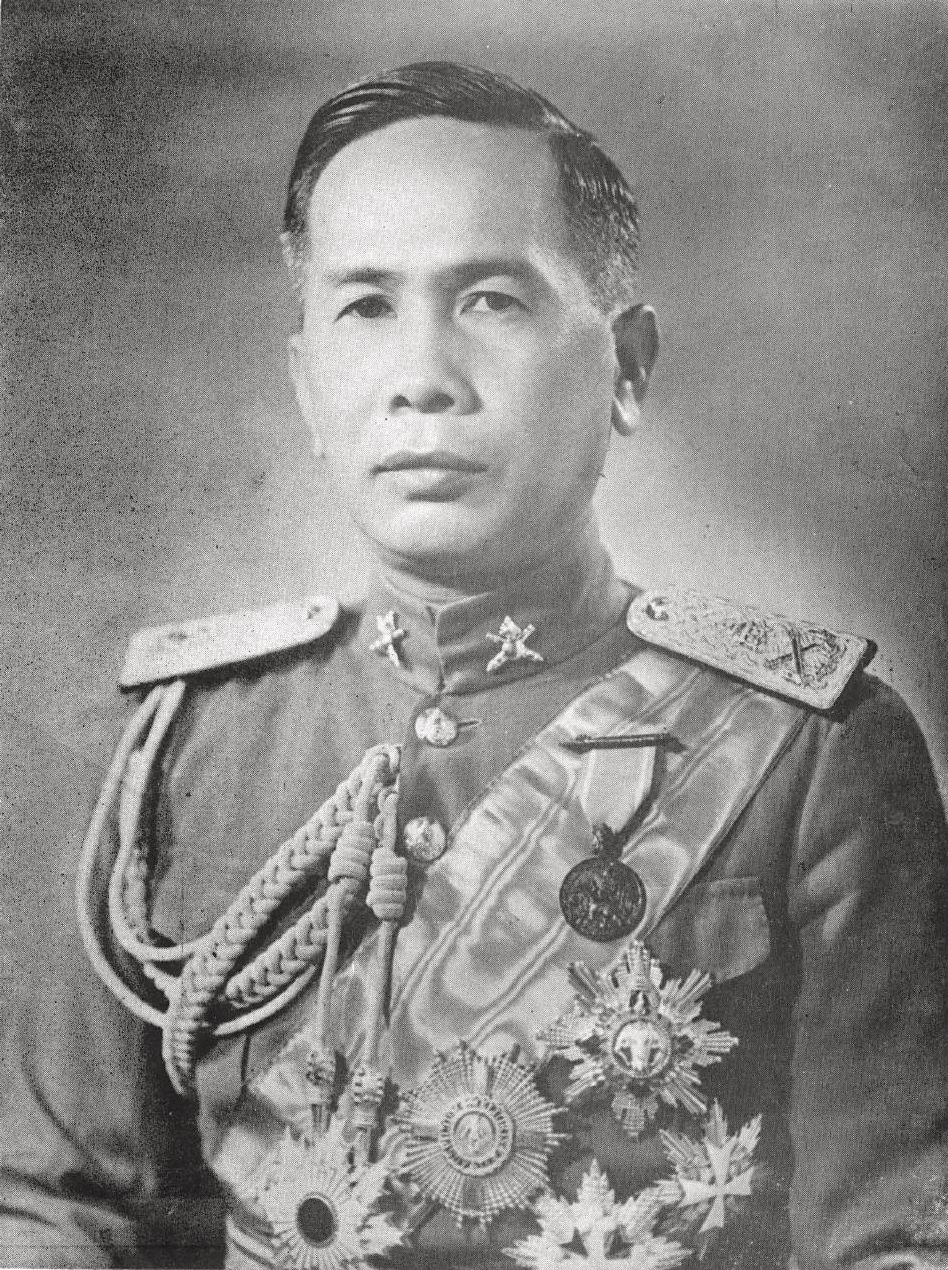
Plaek Phibunsongkhram

- June 3
  - Raoul Magrin-Vernerey, French army officer (born 1892)
  - Frans Eemil Sillanpää, Finnish writer, Nobel Prize laureate (born 1888)
- June 6 –
  - Prince Hermann of Saxe-Weimar-Eisenach (born 1886)
  - Guy Banister, FBI agent. (born 1901)
- June 7
  - Violet Attlee, Countess Attlee, wife of former British PM Clement Attlee (born 1895)
  - Charlie Llewellyn, first non-white South African Test cricketer (born 1876)
- June 8 – Carlos Quintanilla, 37th President of Bolivia (born 1888)
- June 9 – Max Aitken, 1st Baron Beaverbrook, Canadian-born British newspaper publisher and politician (born 1879)
- June 11
  - Catharine Carter Critcher, American painter (born 1868)
  - John Eke, Swedish Olympic athlete (born 1886)
  - Plaek Phibunsongkhram, Thai field marshal and 3rd Prime Minister of Thailand (born 1897)
- June 18 – Giorgio Morandi, Italian painter (born 1890)
- June 20 – Loke Wan Tho, Singaporean business magnate, ornithologist, and photographer (born 1915)
- June 24 – Stuart Davis, American painter (born 1892)
- June 25 – Gerrit Rietveld, Dutch architect (born 1888)
- June 27 – Salvatore Aldisio, Italian politician (born 1890)
- June 29 – Eric Dolphy, American saxophonist (born 1928)

=== July ===
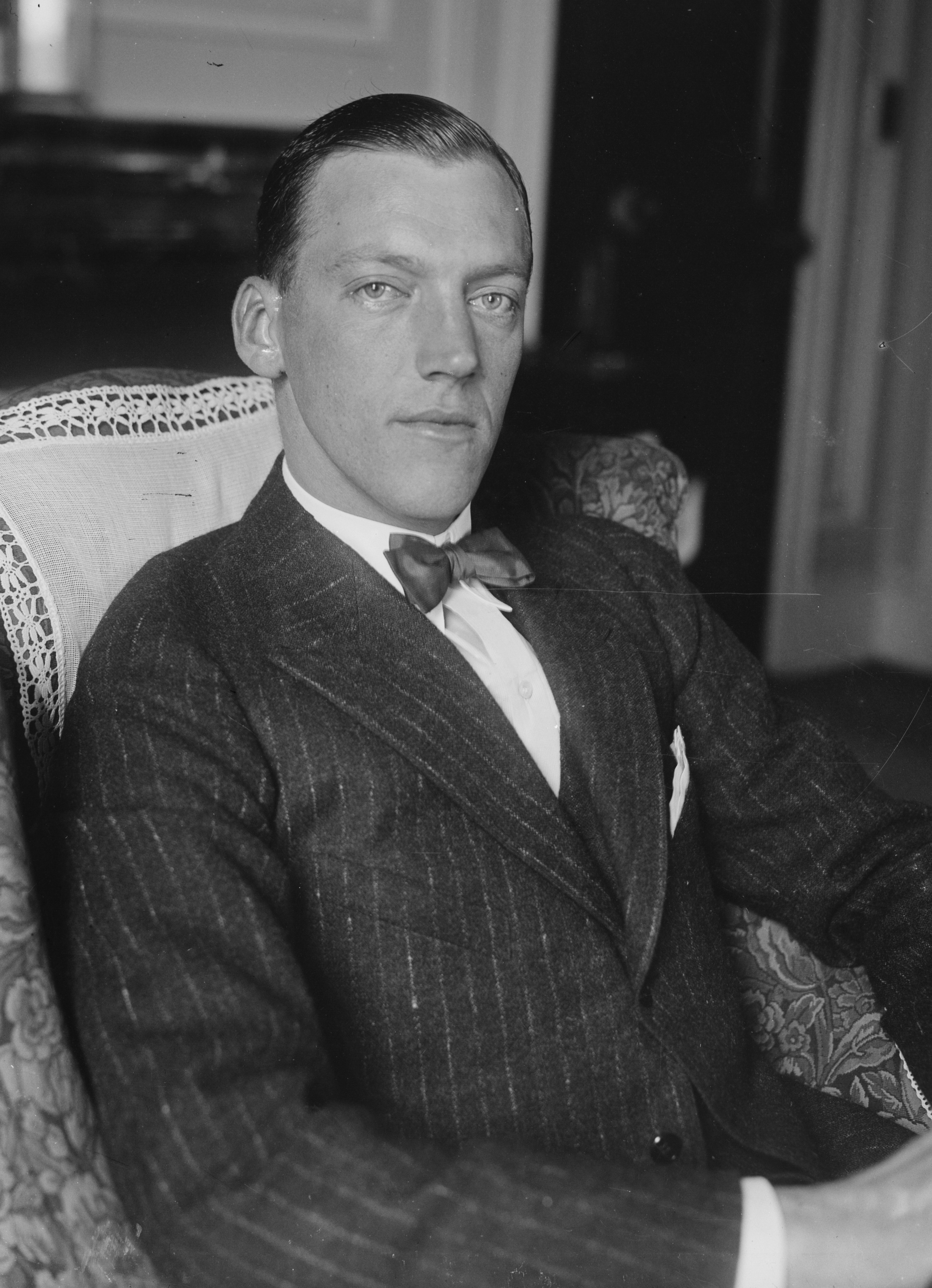
Prince Axel of Denmark

- July 1 – Pierre Monteux, French conductor (born 1875)
- July 2 – Fireball Roberts, American race car driver and a member of the NASCAR Hall of Fame (born 1929)
- July 6 – Zeng Junchen, Sichuan's 'King of Opium' (born 1888)
- July 7 – Lillian Copeland, American athlete (born 1904)
- July 11 – Maurice Thorez, leader of the French Communist Party (born 1900)
- July 13 – Joel Brand, Hungarian rescue worker (born 1906)
- July 14 – Prince Axel of Denmark (born 1888)
- July 15 – Luis Batlle Berres, Uruguayan political figure, 30th President of Uruguay (born 1897)
- July 16 – Alfred Junge, German art director (born 1886)
- July 21 – Jean Fautrier, French painter and sculptor (born 1898)
- July 22
  - Leonid Baratov, Soviet director (born 1895)
  - Gildo Bocci, Italian actor (born 1886)
- July 23 – Thakin Kodaw Hmaing, Burmese poet and politician (born 1876)
- July 25 – Sir John Latham, Australian judge and politician (born 1877)
- July 31 – Jim Reeves, American country singer (born 1923)

=== August ===
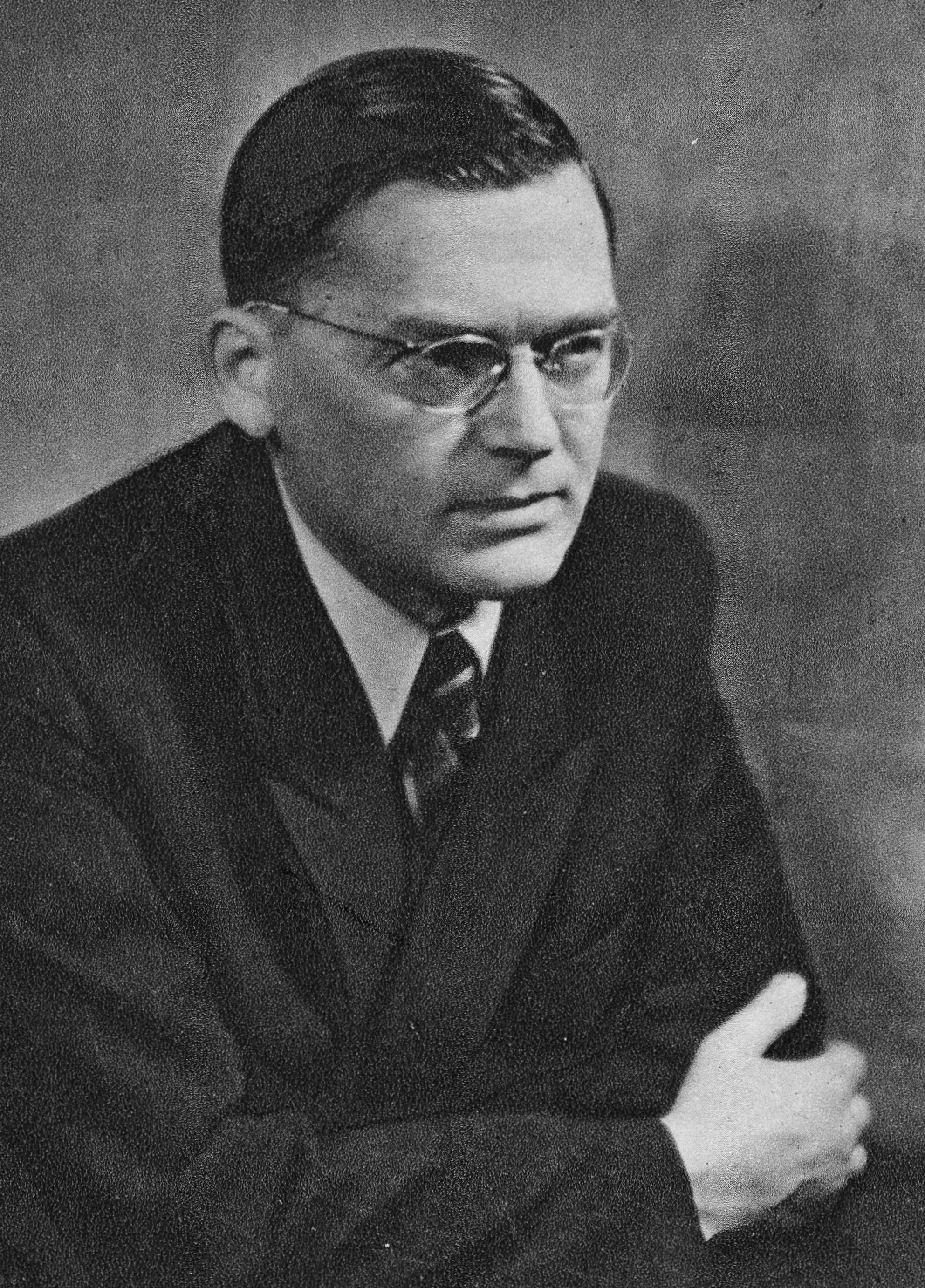
Aleksander Zawadzki

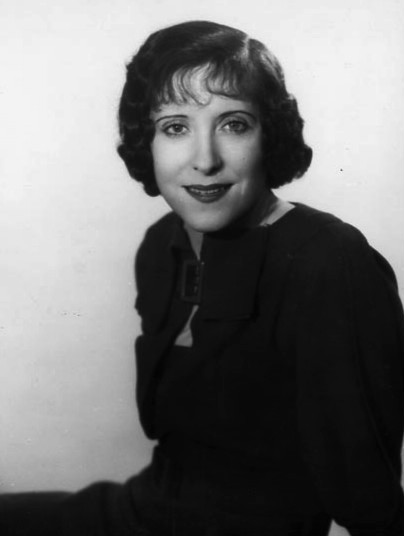
Gracie Allen

- August 3 – Flannery O'Connor, American writer (born 1925)
- August 6 – Sir Cedric Hardwicke, English actor (born 1893)
- August 7
  - Salima Machamba, Sultan of Mohéli (born 1874)
  - Aleksander Zawadzki, Polish politician, 12th President of Poland (born 1899)
- August 9 – Fontaine Fox, American cartoonist (born 1884)
- August 11 – André Aymard, French historian (born 1900)
- August 12
  - Isidro Fabela, Mexican judge and politician (born 1882)
  - Ian Fleming, British writer (born 1908)
  - Dmitry Dmitrievich Maksutov, Soviet astronomer and inventor (born 1896)
- August 13 – Mushtaq Hussain Khan, Indian musician (born 1878)
- August 14 – Johnny Burnette, American singer (born 1934)
- August 18 – Mohammad Gul Khan Momand, Afghani politician (born 1885)
- August 20 – Anthony de Francisci, Italian-born American sculptor (born 1887)
- August 21 – Palmiro Togliatti, leader of the Italian Communist Party (born 1893)
- August 22 – Symeon Lukach, Soviet Eastern Catholic bishop, martyr and blessed (born 1893)
- August 23 – Estella Canziani, British painter (born 1887)
- August 27 – Gracie Allen, American actress and comedian, known as part of the comedy duo Burns and Allen (born 1895)
- August 28 – Lumsden Hare, Irish-born actor, theatre director, and theatre producer
- August 30 – Aleksei Aleksandrovich Grechkin, Soviet commander (born 1893)

=== September ===
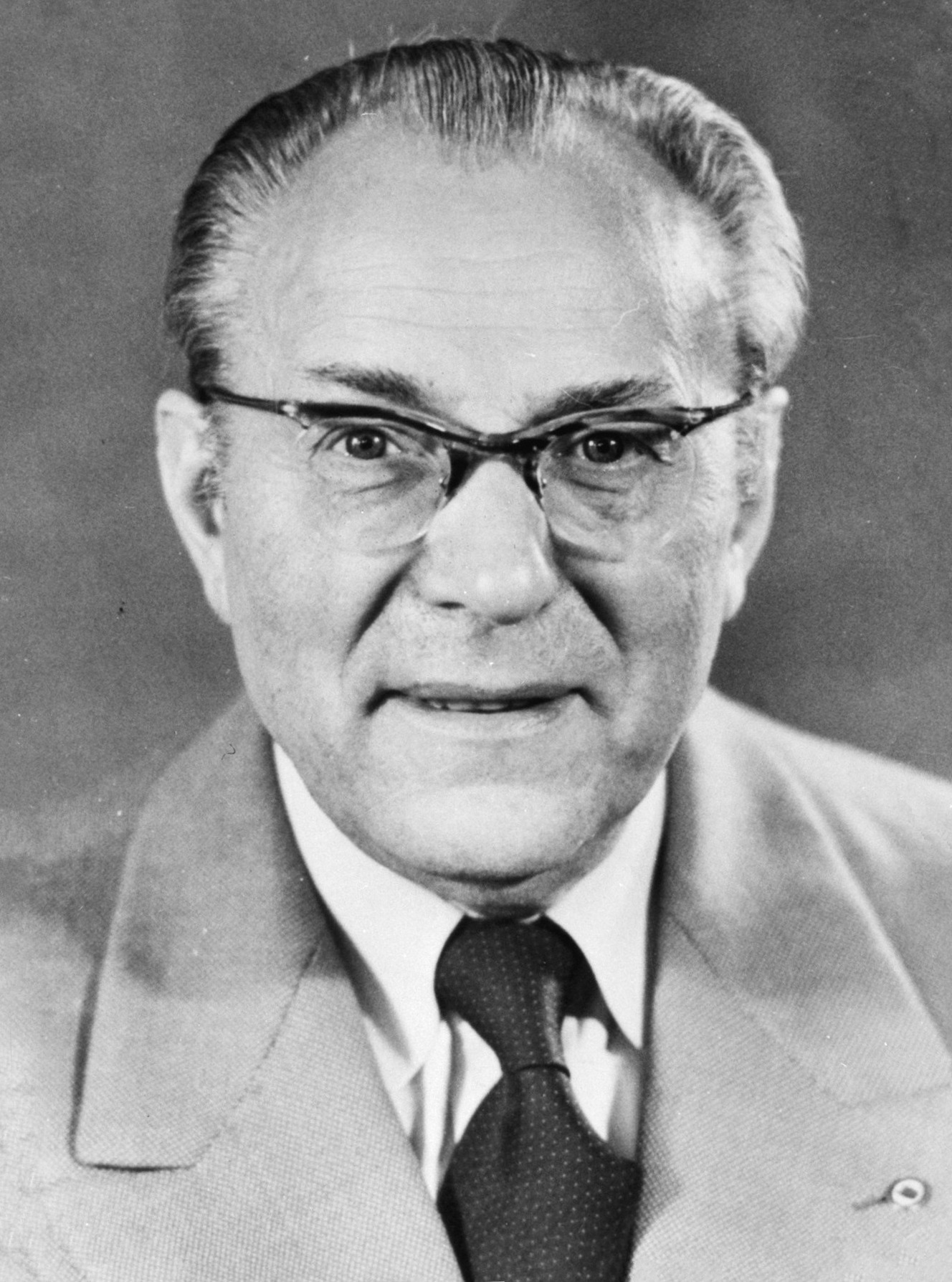
Otto Grotewohl

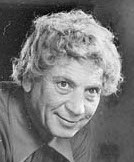
Harpo Marx

- September 2
  - Glenn Albert Black, American archaeologist (born 1900)
  - Francisco Craveiro Lopes, Portuguese military officer and politician, 12th President of Portugal (born 1894)
  - Alvin York, American hero of World War I (born 1887)
- September 16 – Bobby Bauer, Canadian ice hockey player (born 1915)
- September 17 – Clive Bell, English art critic (born 1881)
- September 18
  - J. Frank Dobie, American folklorist and journalist (born 1888)
  - Seán O'Casey, Irish writer (born 1880)
- September 21 – Otto Grotewohl, East German Communist politician, 1st Prime Minister of the German Democratic Republic (born 1894)
- September 28 – Harpo Marx, American comedian, actor, mime artist, and musician (born 1888)
- September 29 – Fred Tootell, American Olympic athlete (born 1902)

=== October ===
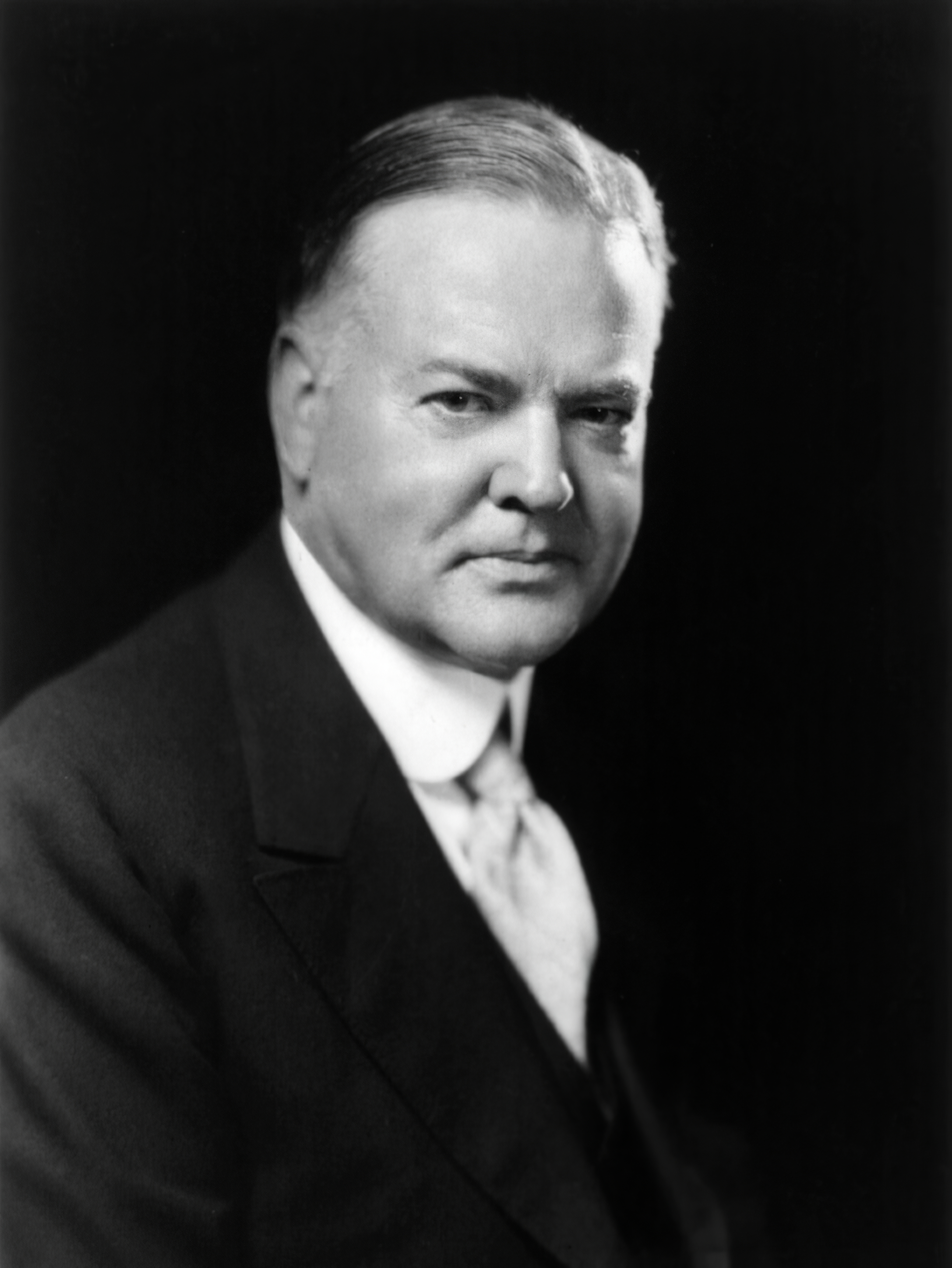
Herbert Hoover

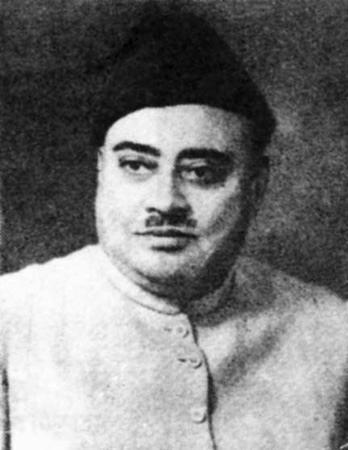
Khawaja Nazimuddin

- October 1 – Ernst Toch, Austrian composer (born 1887)
- October 10 – Eddie Cantor, American actor, comedian and dancer (born 1892)
- October 15 – Cole Porter, American composer and lyricist (born 1891)
- October 20 – Herbert Hoover, American politician, 31st President of the United States (born 1874)
- October 22 – Khawaja Nazimuddin, Pakistani political figure, 2nd Prime Minister of Pakistan (born 1894)
- October 25 – Joe Henderson, American rhythm and blues and gospel music singer (born 1937)
- October 27
  - Pierre C. Cartier, French jeweller (born 1878)
  - Rudolph Maté, Polish cinematographer (born 1898)
- October 29
  - Claudio Ermelli, Italian actor (born 1892)
  - Henry Larsen, Canadian explorer (born 1899)

=== November ===
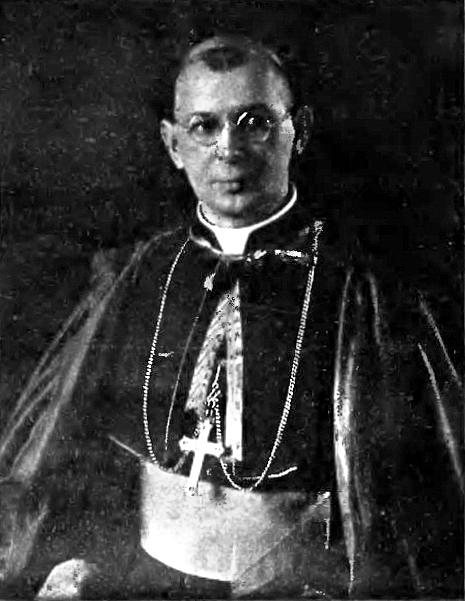
Servant of God Franciszek Barda

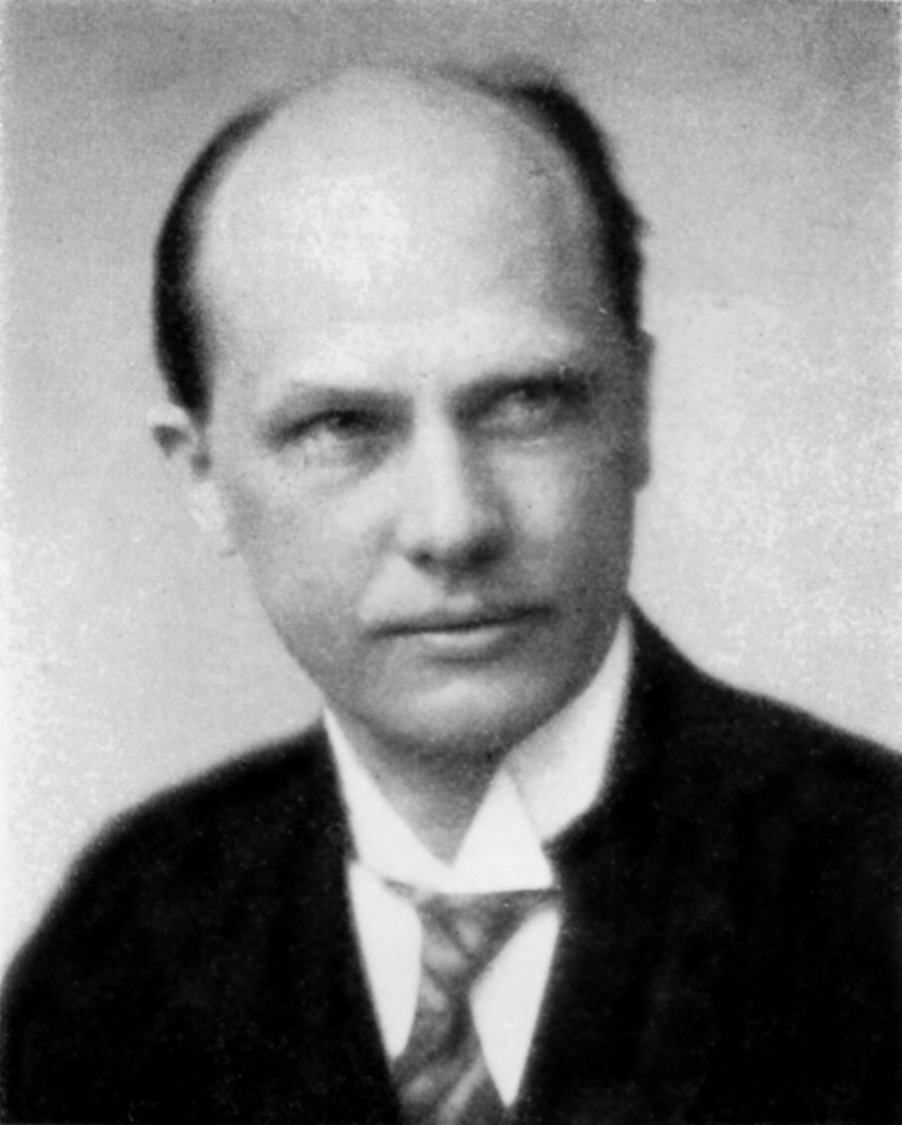
Rickard Sandler

- November 2
  - Sir Charles Allfrey, British general (b. 1895)
  - José Ramón Guizado, Panamanian politician, 17th President of Panama (born 1899)
- November 5
  - Mabel Lucie Attwell, British illustrator (born 1879)
  - John S. Robertson, Canadian film director (born 1878)
- November 6 – Hans von Euler-Chelpin, German-born chemist, Nobel Prize laureate (born 1873)
- November 10 – Jimmie Dodd, American actor, singer and songwriter (b. 1910)
- November 11
  - Franciszek Barda, Polish Roman Catholic clergyman and servant of God (born 1880)
  - Juan de Dios Filiberto, Argentine violinist (born 1885)
  - Eduard Steuermann, Austrian-American pianist and composer (born 1892)
- November 12 – Rickard Sandler, Swedish politician, 20th Prime Minister of Sweden (born 1884)
- November 13 – Oskar Becker, German philosopher (born 1889)
- November 14 – Heinrich von Brentano, German politician (born 1904)
- November 18 – Tommaso Besozzi, Italian journalist (born 1903)
- November 25 – Clarence Kolb, American actor (born 1874)

=== December ===
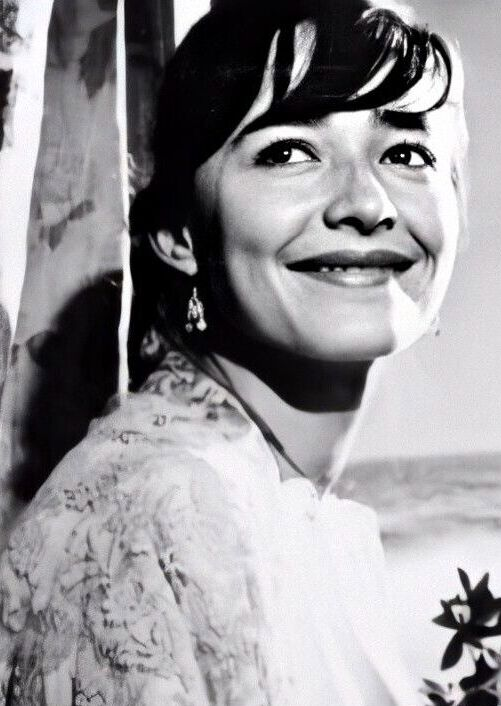
Pina Pellicer

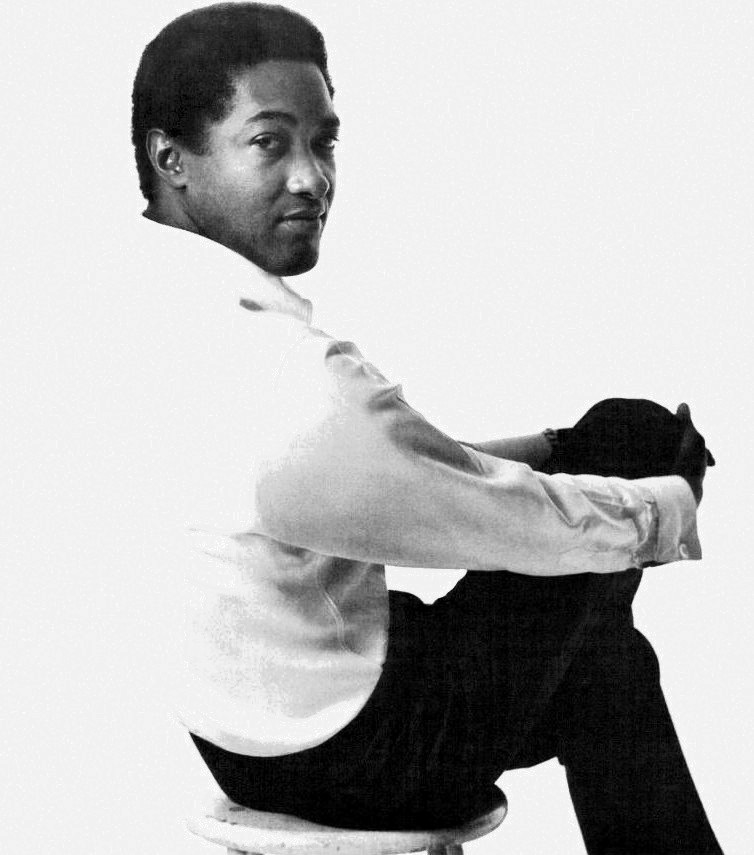
Sam Cooke

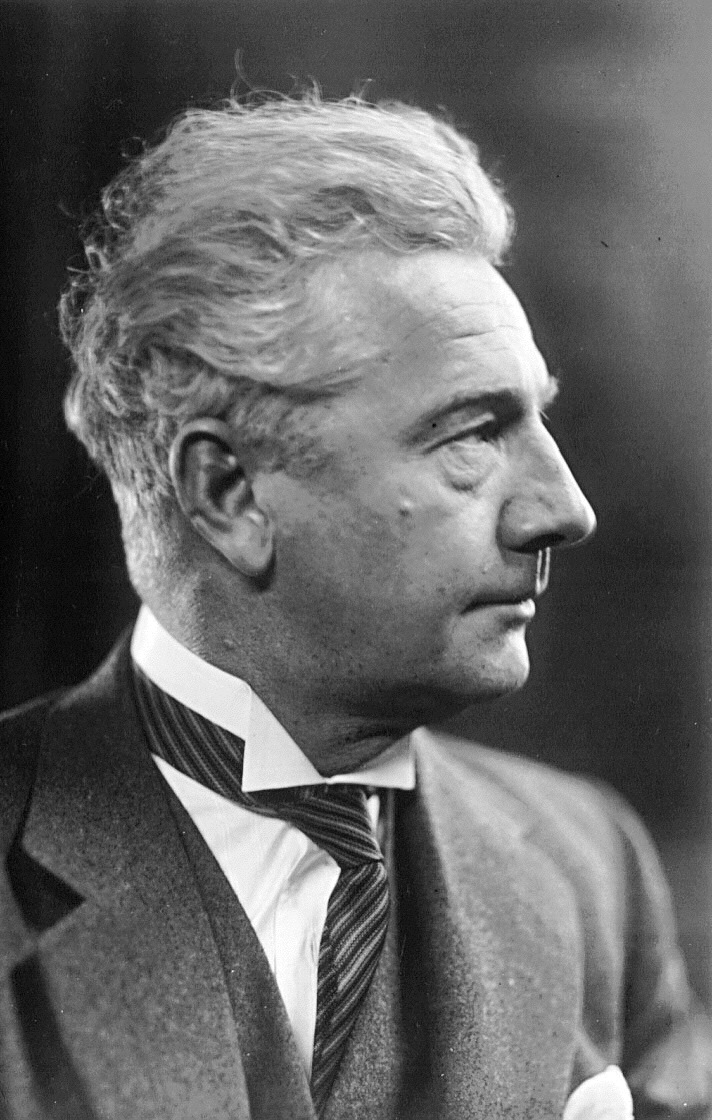
Ólafur Thors

- December 1
  - Marie-Clémentine Anuarite Nengapeta, Congolese Roman Catholic religious sister (born 1939)
  - J. B. S. Haldane, British geneticist (born 1892)
- December 4 – Pina Pellicer, Mexican actress (born 1934)
- December 5 – V. Veerasingam, Ceylon Tamil teacher and politician (born 1892)
- December 6 – Consuelo Vanderbilt, Duchess of Marlborough (born 1877)
- December 9 – Dame Edith Sitwell, British poet (born 1887)
- December 10 – Mariano Rossell y Arellano, Guatemalan clergyman (born 1894)
- December 11
  - Sam Cooke, American singer and songwriter (born 1931)
  - Alma Mahler, wife of Gustav Mahler (born 1879)
- December 13 – Ernesto Almirante, Italian actor (born 1877)
- December 14 – William Bendix, American actor (born 1906)
- December 15 – C. J. Hambro, Norwegian politician and journalist (born 1885)
- December 17 – Victor Francis Hess, Austrian-born American physicist, Nobel Prize laureate (born 1883)
- December 21 – Carl Van Vechten, American writer and photographer (born 1880)
- December 22 – Rosa Borja de Ycaza, Ecuadorian writer (born 1889)
- December 24 – Kuksha of Odessa, Eastern Orthodox priest (born 1875)
- December 29 – Vladimir Favorsky, Russian artist and engraver (born 1886)
- December 30 – Hans Gerhard Creutzfeldt, German neuropathologist (born 1885)
- December 31
  - Ronald Fairbairn, Scottish psychiatrist and psychoanalyst (born 1889)
  - Ólafur Thors, Icelandic politician, 8th Prime Minister of Iceland (born 1892)
  - Henry Maitland Wilson, British field marshal (born 1881)

== Nobel Prizes ==

- Physics – Charles Hard Townes, Nicolay Gennadiyevich Basov, Aleksandr Prokhorov
- Chemistry – Dorothy Crowfoot Hodgkin
- Physiology or Medicine – Konrad Bloch, Feodor Lynen
- Literature – Jean-Paul Sartre
- Peace – Martin Luther King Jr.
