= Bishop of Przemyśl (Roman Catholic) =

Roman Catholic archdiocese in southeastern Poland

These are lists of bishops of the Przemyśl archdiocese.

== Diocesan bishops ==
- ?-1351? - Iwan
- 1352-1375? - Mikołaj Rusin
- 1377-1391 - Eryk z Winsen
- 1392-1420 - Maciej Janina
- 1420-1435 - Janusz z Lubienia
- 1436-1452 - Piotr z Chrząstowa
- 1452-1474 - Mikołaj z Błażejowa
- 1475-1481 - Andrzej Oporowski (administrator, bishop from 1479)
- 1482-1484 - Piotr Moszyński
- 1484-1485 - Jan Kaźmierski
- 1486-1492 - Jan z Targowiska
- 1492-1498 - Mikołaj Krajowski
- 1501-1503 - Andrzej Boryszewski
- 1503-1514 - Maciej Drzewicki
- 1514-1520 - Piotr Tomicki
- 1520-1523 - Rafał Leszczyński
- 1523-1527 - Andrzej Krzycki
- 1527-1531 - Jan Karnkowski
- 1531-1535 - Jan Chojeński
- 1535-1537 - Piotr Gamrat
- 1537-1544 - Stanisław Tarło
- 1545-1559 - Jan Dzieduski
- 1560-1560 - Filip Padniewski
- 1560-1572 - Walenty Herburt
- 1574-1577 - Łukasz Kościelecki
- 1577-1583 - Wojciech Staroźrebski Sobiejuski
- 1583-1584 - Jan Borukowski
- 1585-1591 - Wojciech Baranowski
- 1591-1601 - Wawrzyniec Goślicki
- 1601-1608 - Maciej Pstrokoński
- 1608-1619 - Stanisław Sieciński
- 1619-1624 - Jan Wężyk
- 1624-1627 - Achacy Grochowski
- 1627-1631 - Adam Nowodworski
- 1631-1635 - Henryk Firlej
- 1635-1636 - Andrzej Szołdrski
- 1636-1642 - Piotr Gembicki
- 1642-1644 - Aleksander Trzebiński
- 1644-1649 - Paweł Piasecki
- 1649-1654 - Jan Zamoyski
- 1654-1658 - Andrzej Trzebicki
- 1658-1677 - Stanisław Sarnowski
- 1677-1688 - Jan Stanisław Zbąski
- 1698-1701 - Jerzy Albrecht Denhoff
- 1701-1718 - Jan Kazimierz de Alten Bokum
- 1719-1724 - Krzysztof Andrzej Jan Szembek
- 1724-1734 - Aleksander Antoni Fredro
- 1734-1741 - Walenty Aleksander Czapski
- 1741-1760 - Wacław Hieronim Sierakowski
- 1760-1764 - Michał Wodzicki
- 1765-1766 - Walenty Wężyk
- 1766-1768 - Andrzej Stanisław Młodziejewski
- 1768-1783 - Józef Tadeusz Kierski
- 1783-1786 - Antoni Wacław Betański
- 1786-1824 - Antoni Gołaszewski
- 1825-1832 - Jan Antoni de Potoczki
- 1834-1839 - Michał Korczyński
- 1840-1845 - Franciszek Ksawery Zachariasiewicz
- 1846-1860 - Franciszek Ksawery Wierzchleyski
- 1860-1862 - Adam Jasiński
- 1863-1869 - Antoni Monastyrski
- 1870-1881 - Maciej Hirschler
- 1881-1900 - Łukasz Solecki
- 1900-1924 - Józef Sebastian Pelczar
- 1924-1933 - Anatol Nowak
- 1933-1964 - Franciszek Barda
- 1965-1992 - Ignacy Tokarczuk

== Metropolitan archbishops ==
- 1992-1993 - Ignacy Tokarczuk
- 1993-2016 - Józef Michalik
- 2016-present - Adam Szal

== Suffragan bishops ==
- 1681-1691 - Jan Dębski
- 1692-1699 - Ludwik Załuski
- 1699-1714 - Paweł Konstanty Dubrawski
- 1714-1717 - Łukasz Jacek Czermiński
- 1718-1720 - Stanisław Hozjusz
- 1721-1723 - Michał Piechowski
- 1723-1728 - Franciszek Szembek
- 1728-1759 - Andrzej Pruski
- 1761-1765 - Hieronim Wielogłoski
- 1768-1769 - Michał Witosławski
- 1769-1769 - Antoni Onufry Urbański, (d. before consecration)
- 1770-1776 - Stanisław Wykowski
- 1778-1786 - Michał Roman Sierakowski
- 1781-1783 - Antoni Wacław Betański
- 1882-1885 - Ignacy Łobos
- 1887-1898 - Jakub Glazer
- 1889-1900 - Józef Sebastian Pelczar
- 1901-1931 - Karol Józef Fischer
- 1931-1933 - Franciszek Barda
- 1933-1967 - Wojciech Tomaka
- 1957-1983 - Stanisław Jakiel
- 1964-1993 - Bolesław Łukasz Taborski
- 1970-1993 - Tadeusz Błaszkiewicz
- 1984-2004 - Stefan Moskwa
- 1988-1993 - Edward Białogłowski
- 1989-1993 - Edward Marian Frankowski
