= List of Catholic dioceses in Poland =

The Roman Catholic Church in Poland comprises mainly sixteen Latin ecclesiastical provinces, each headed by a metropolitan, whose archdioceses have a total of 28 suffragan dioceses, each headed by a bishop. They are all members of the Episcopal Conference of Poland, one of the larger conferences in Europe, slightly smaller than Spain, but larger than the United Kingdom or Germany and by far the most established conference in all of Eastern Europe.

Furthermore, there are

- an exempt military ordinariate for the armed forces
- the Eastern Catholic province of the Metropolitan Ukrainian Catholic Archeparchy of Przemyśl–Warszawa and its suffragans as a Byzantine Rite in Ukrainian language
- an Ordinariate for the Faithful of the Eastern Rites for all other non-Latin rites in Poland.

There is also an Apostolic Nunciature to Poland, as papal diplomatic (embassy-level) representation.

== Current Latin dioceses ==
=== Exempt Latin jurisdiction ===
- Military Ordinariate of Poland (Ordynariat Polowy Wojska Polskiego)

=== Ecclesiastical province of Białystok ===
- Metropolitan Archdiocese of Białystok
  - Diocese of Drohiczyn
  - Diocese of Łomża

=== Ecclesiastical province of Częstochowa ===
- Metropolitan Archdiocese of Częstochowa
  - Diocese of Radom
  - Diocese of Sosnowiec

=== Ecclesiastical province of Gdańsk ===
- Metropolitan Archdiocese of Gdańsk
  - Diocese of Pelplin
  - Diocese of Toruń

=== Ecclesiastical province of Gniezno ===
- Metropolitan Archdiocese of Gniezno, the Polish primatial see
  - Diocese of Bydgoszcz
  - Diocese of Włocławek

=== Ecclesiastical province of Katowice ===
- Metropolitan Archdiocese of Katowice
  - Diocese of Gliwice
  - Diocese of Opole

=== Ecclesiastical province of Kraków ===
- Metropolitan Archdiocese of Kraków
  - Diocese of Bielsko-Żywiec
  - Diocese of Kielce
  - Diocese of Tarnów

=== Ecclesiastical province of Łódź ===
- Metropolitan Archdiocese of Łódź
  - Diocese of Łowicz

=== Ecclesiastical province of Lublin ===
- Metropolitan Archdiocese of Lublin
  - Diocese of Sandomierz
  - Diocese of Siedlce

=== Ecclesiastical province of Poznań ===
- Metropolitan Archdiocese of Poznań
  - Diocese of Kalisz

=== Ecclesiastical province of Przemyśl ===
- Metropolitan Archdiocese of Przemyśl
  - Diocese of Rzeszów
  - Diocese of Zamość-Lubaczów

=== Ecclesiastical province of Szczecin-Kamień ===
- Metropolitan Archdiocese of Szczecin-Kamień
  - Diocese of Koszalin-Kołobrzeg
  - Diocese of Zielona Góra-Gorzów

=== Ecclesiastical province of Warmia ===
- Metropolitan Archdiocese of Warmia
  - Diocese of Elbląg
  - Diocese of Ełk

=== Ecclesiastical province of Warszawa ===
- Metropolitan Archdiocese of Warszawa
  - Diocese of Płock
  - Diocese of Warszawa-Praga

=== Ecclesiastical province of Wrocław ===
- Metropolitan Archdiocese of Wrocław
  - Diocese of Legnica
  - Diocese of Świdnica

== Current Eastern Catholic dioceses ==
=== Ukrainian Catholic province of Przemyśl–Warszawa ===
rite-specific particular church sui iuris : Byzantine Rite in Ukrainian language

- Metropolitan Ukrainian Catholic Archeparchy of Przemyśl–Warsaw
  - Ukrainian Catholic Eparchy of Olsztyn–Gdańsk
  - Ukrainian Catholic Eparchy of Wrocław-Koszalin.

=== Exempt, joint for the other rites ===
- Ordinariate for the Faithful of the Eastern Rites for all other non-Latin rites in Poland.

== Defunct dioceses ==
Four Episcopal Titular bishoprics: Diocese of Chełm, Diocese of Pomezania, Diocese of Sejny, Diocese of Wigry.

== Gallery of archdioceses ==
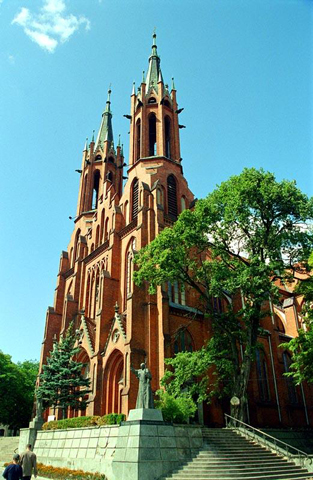
The seat of the Archdiocese of Białystok is Cathedral of the Assumption of the Blessed Virgin Mary.

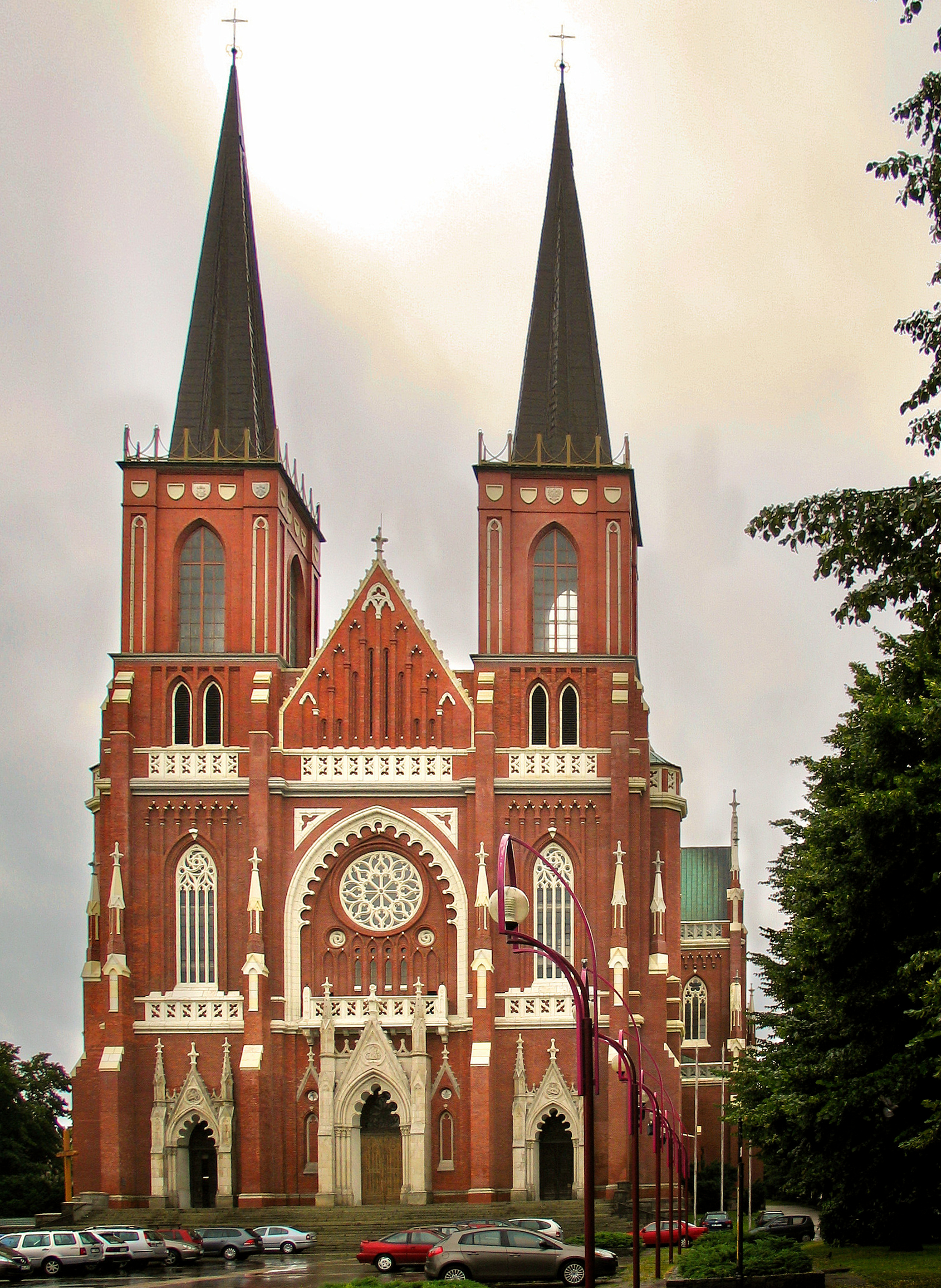
The seat of the Archdiocese of Częstochowa is Cathedral Basilica of the Holy Family.

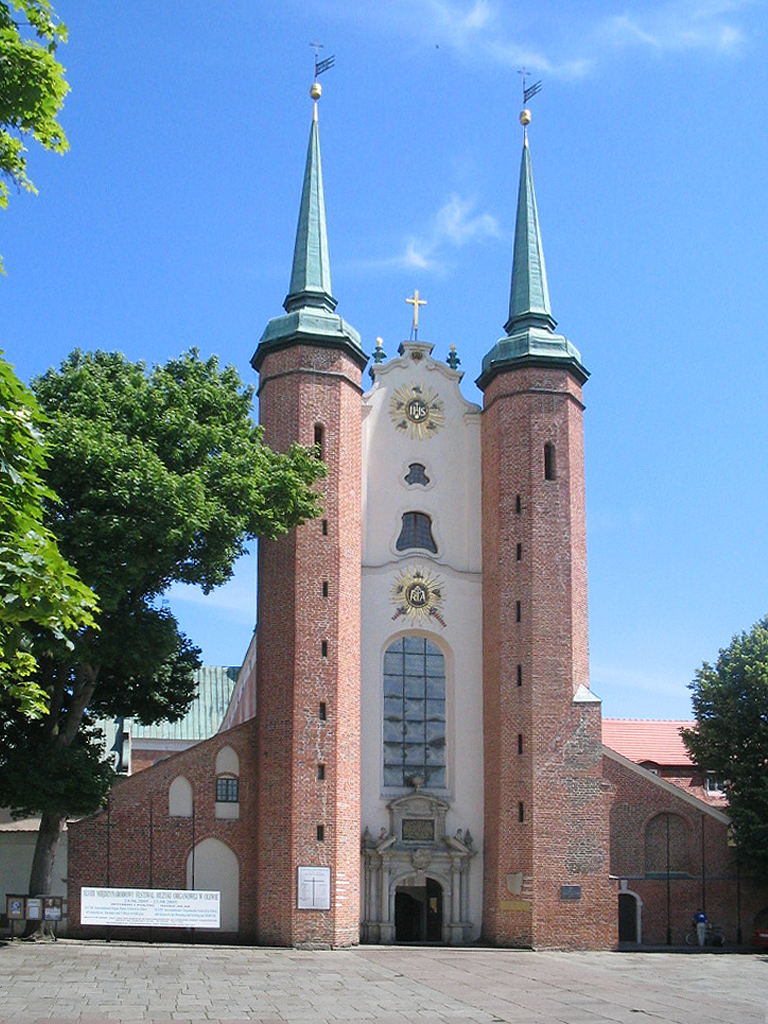
The seat of the Archdiocese of Gdańsk is Cathedral Basilica of the Assumption of the Blessed Virgin Mary.

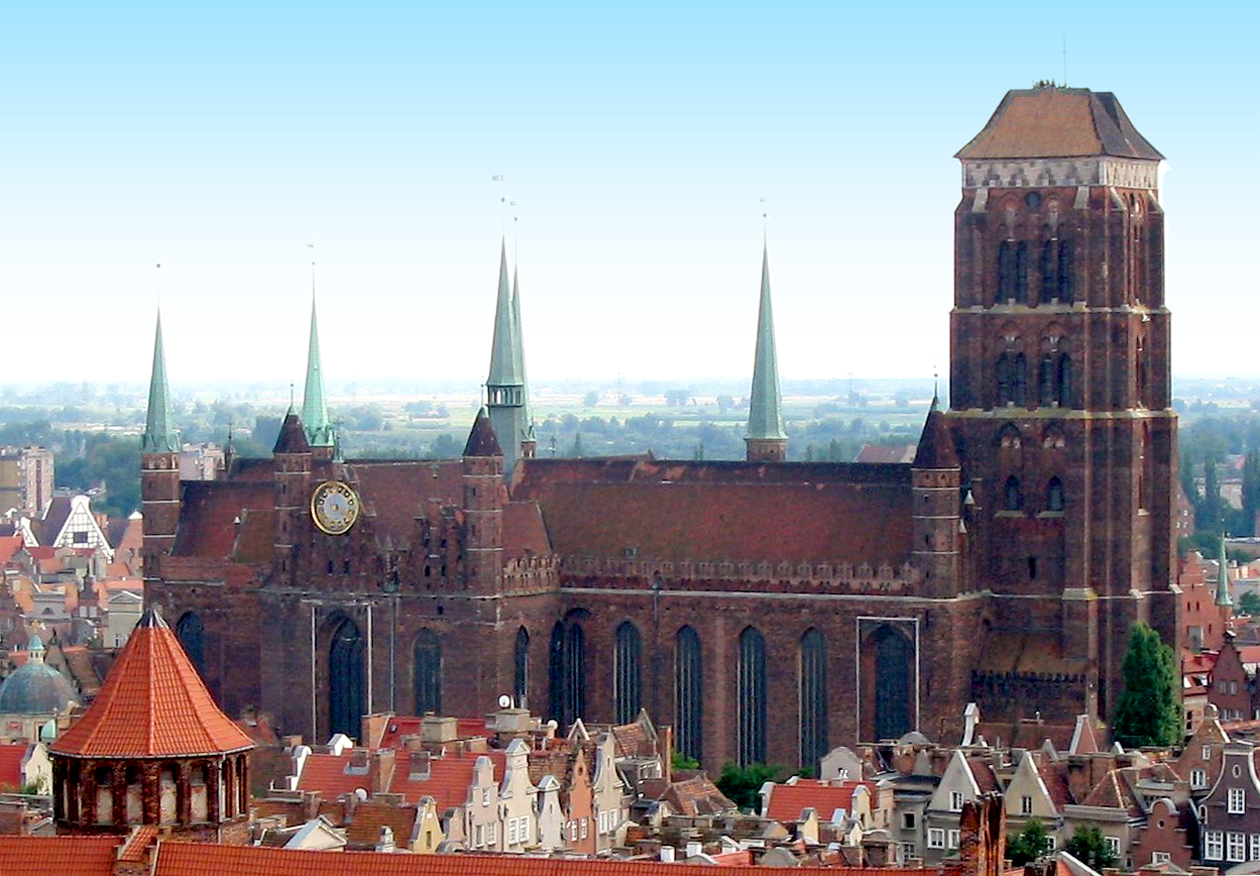
The co-seat of the Archdiocese of Gdańsk is Co-Cathedral Basilica of the Assumption of the Blessed Virgin Mary.

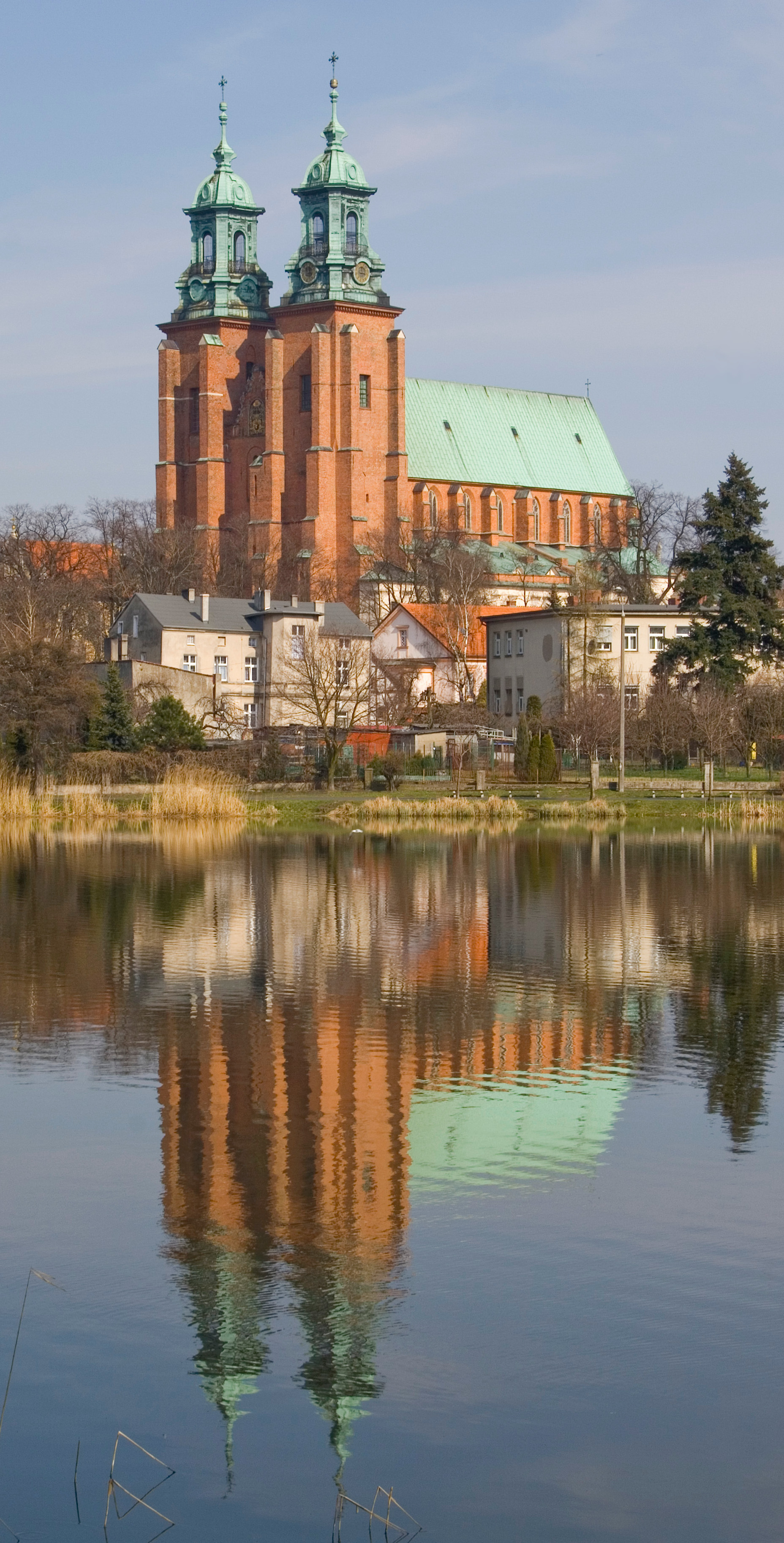
The seat of the Archdiocese of Gniezno is Cathedral Basilica of the Assumption of the Blessed Virgin Mary and St. Adalbert.

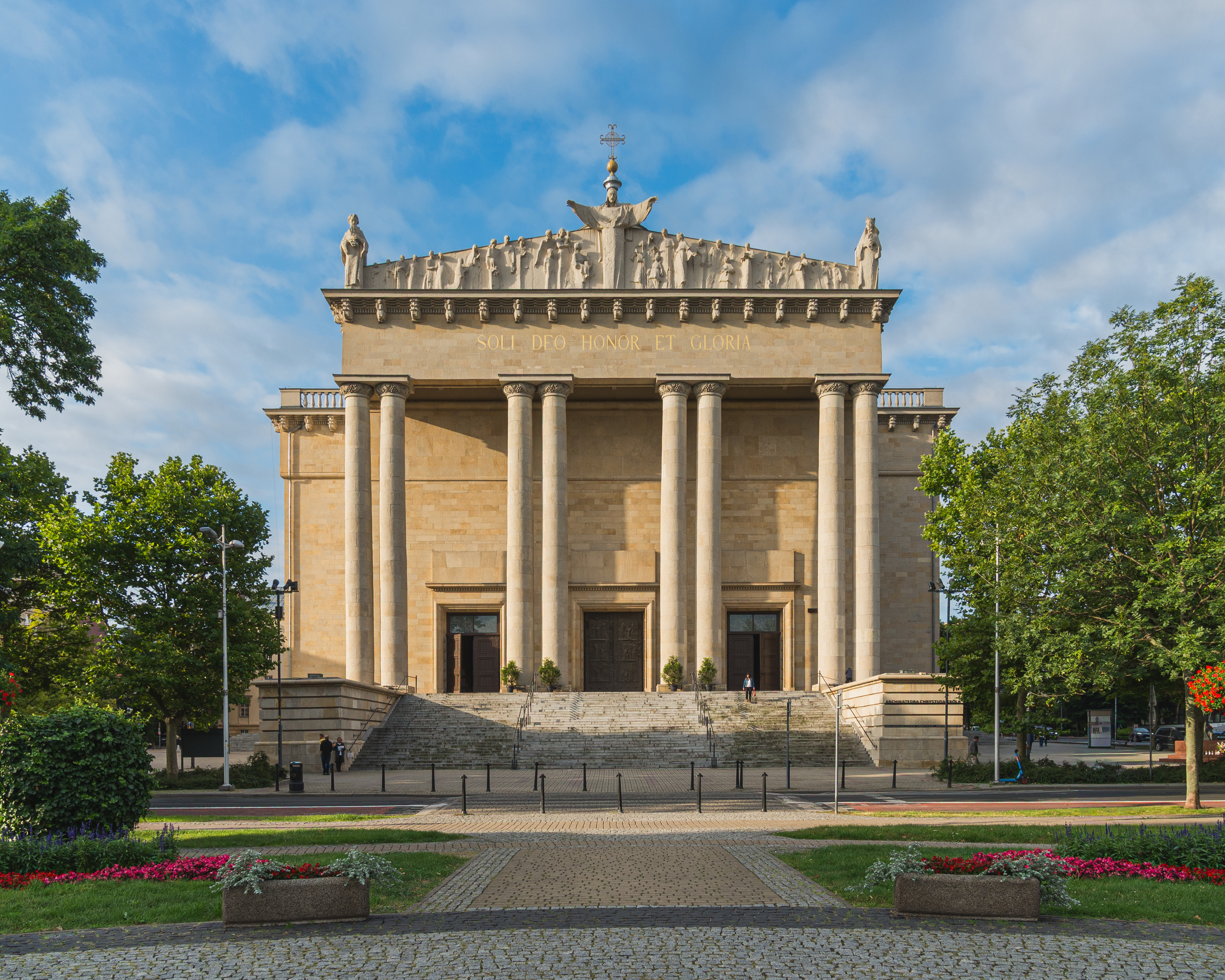
The seat of the Archdiocese of Katowice is Cathedral of Christ the King.

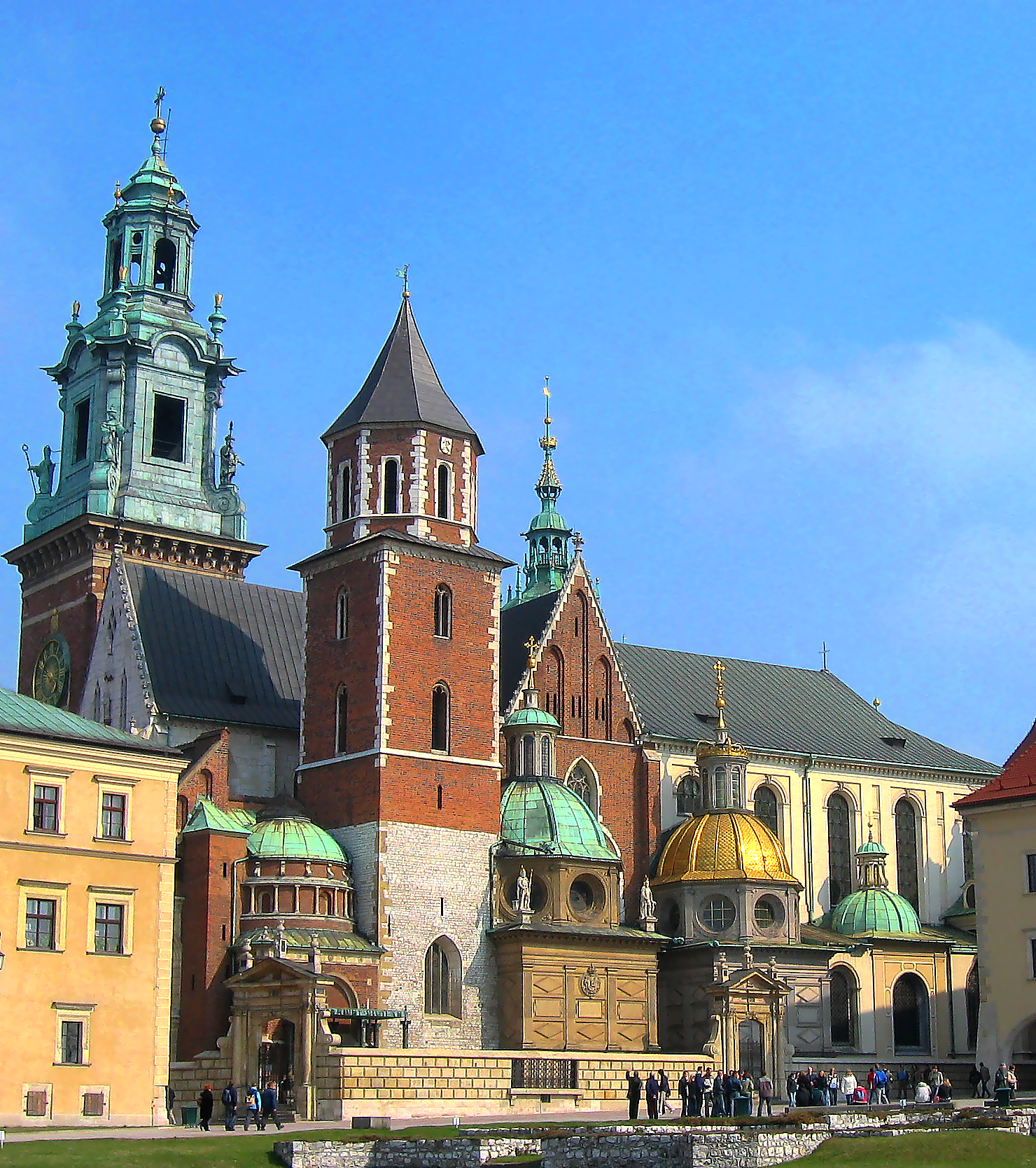
The seat of the Archdiocese of Kraków is Cathedral Basilica of St. Stanislaus and St. Wenceslaus.

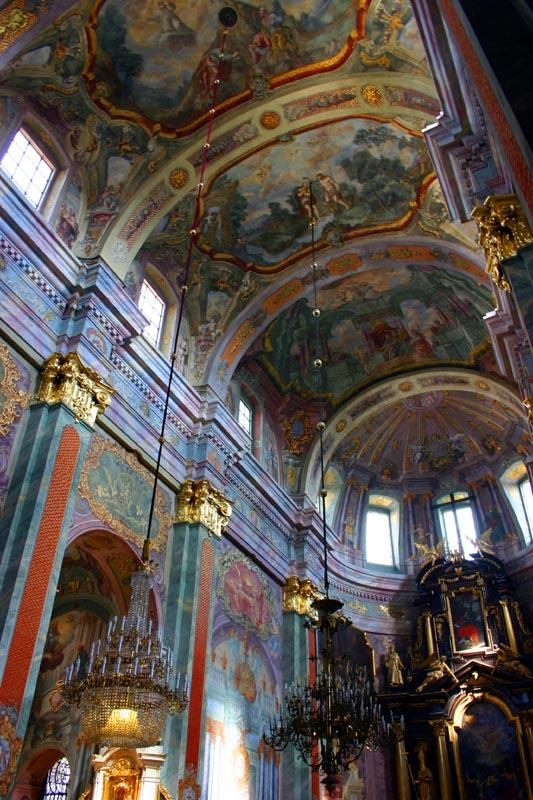
The seat of the Archdiocese of Lublin is Cathedral of St. John the Baptist.

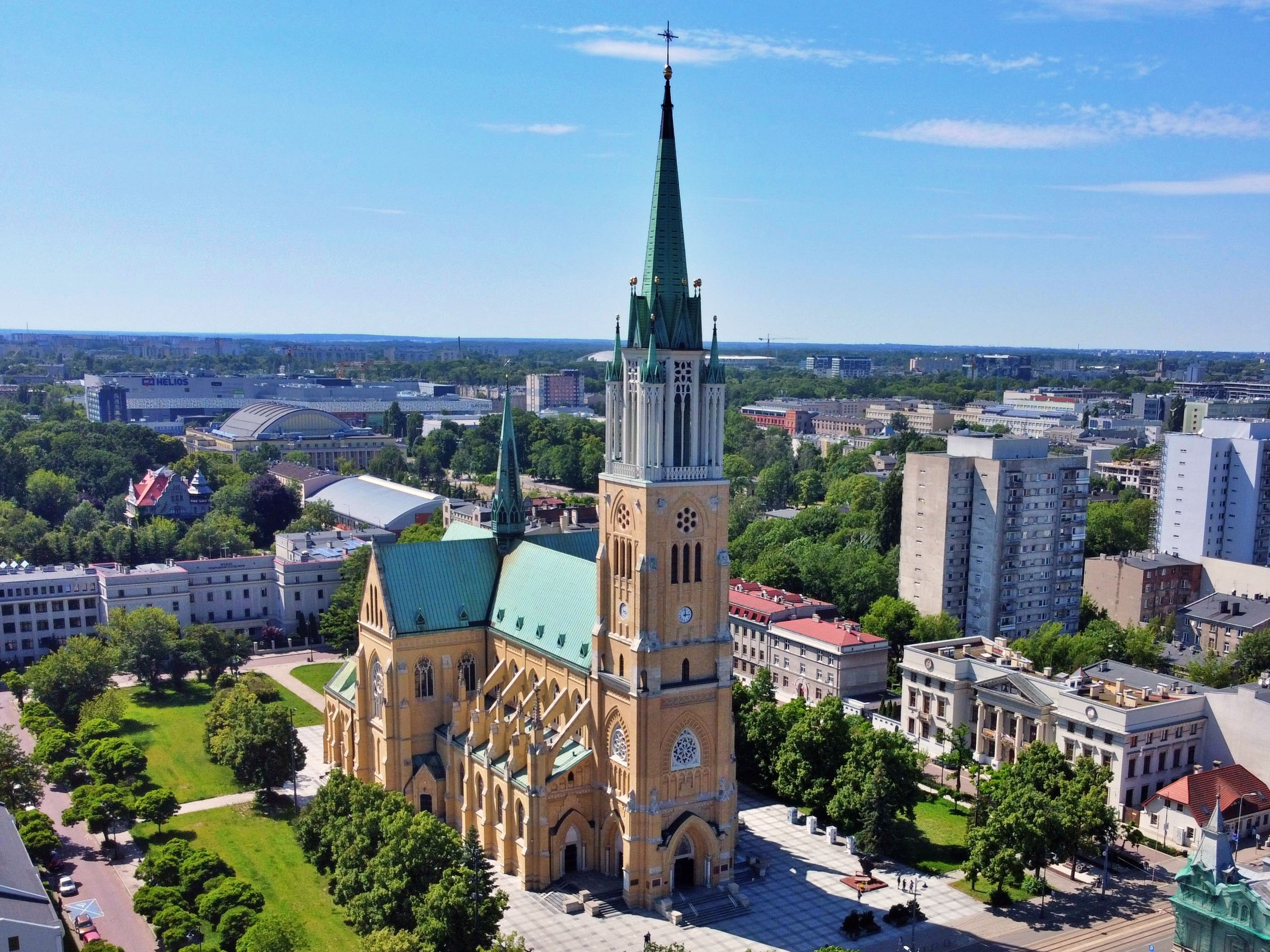
The seat of the Archdiocese of Łódź is the Archcathedral Basilica of St. Stanislaus Kostka.

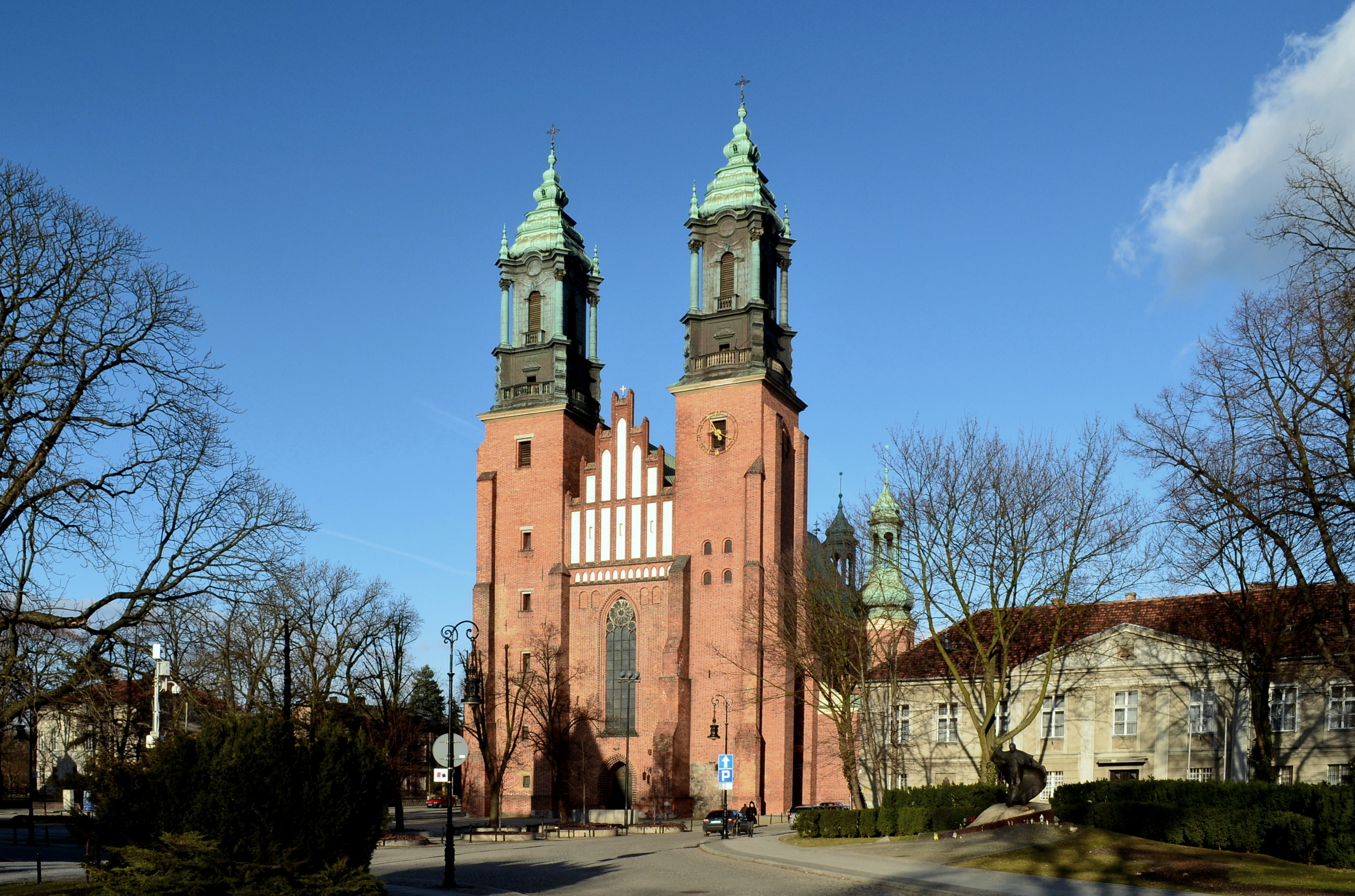
The seat of the Archdiocese of Poznań is Cathedral Basilica of St. Peter and St. Paul.

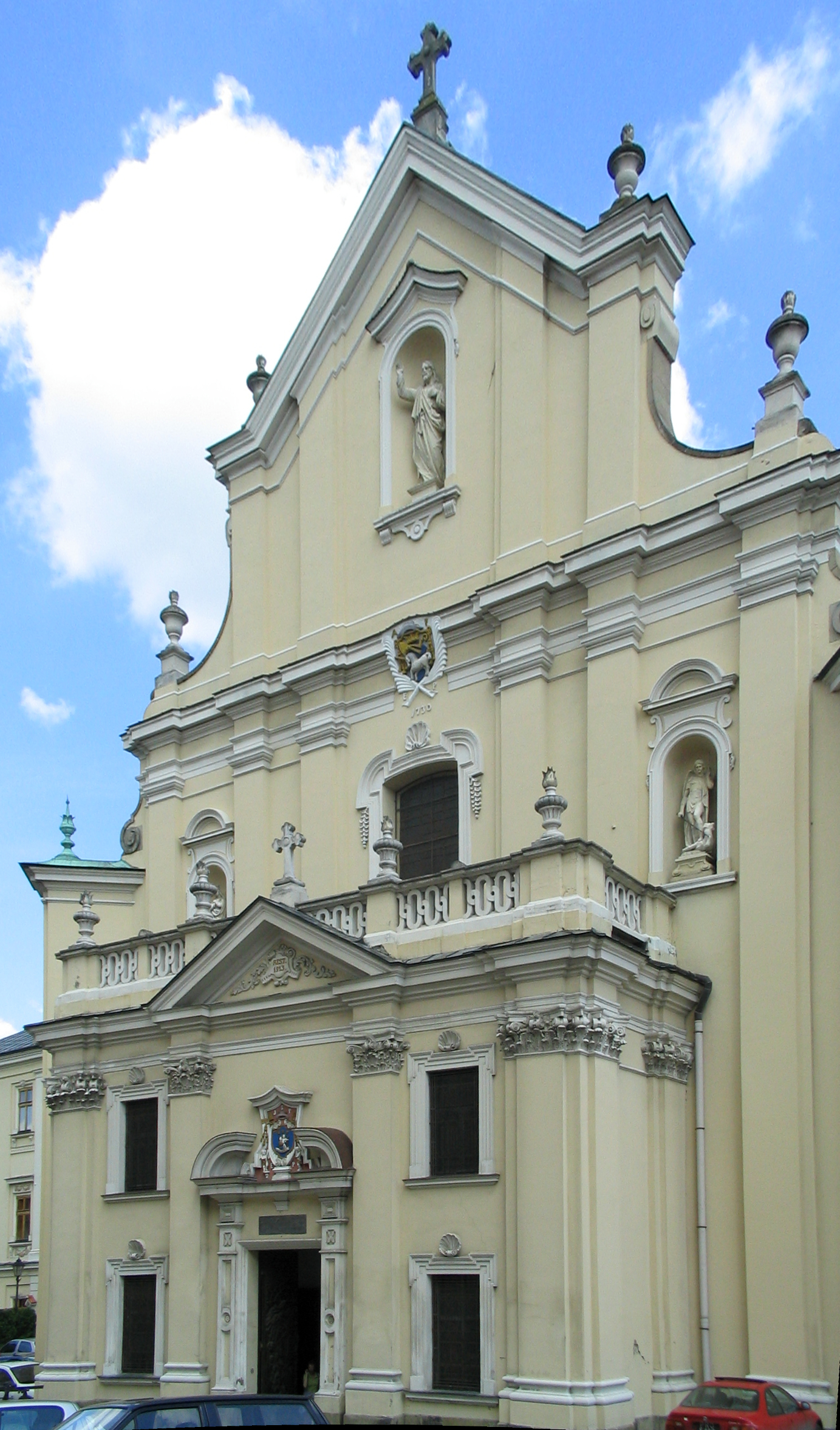
The seat of the Archdiocese of Przemyśl is Cathedral Basilica of the Assumption of the Blessed Virgin Mary and St. John the Baptist.

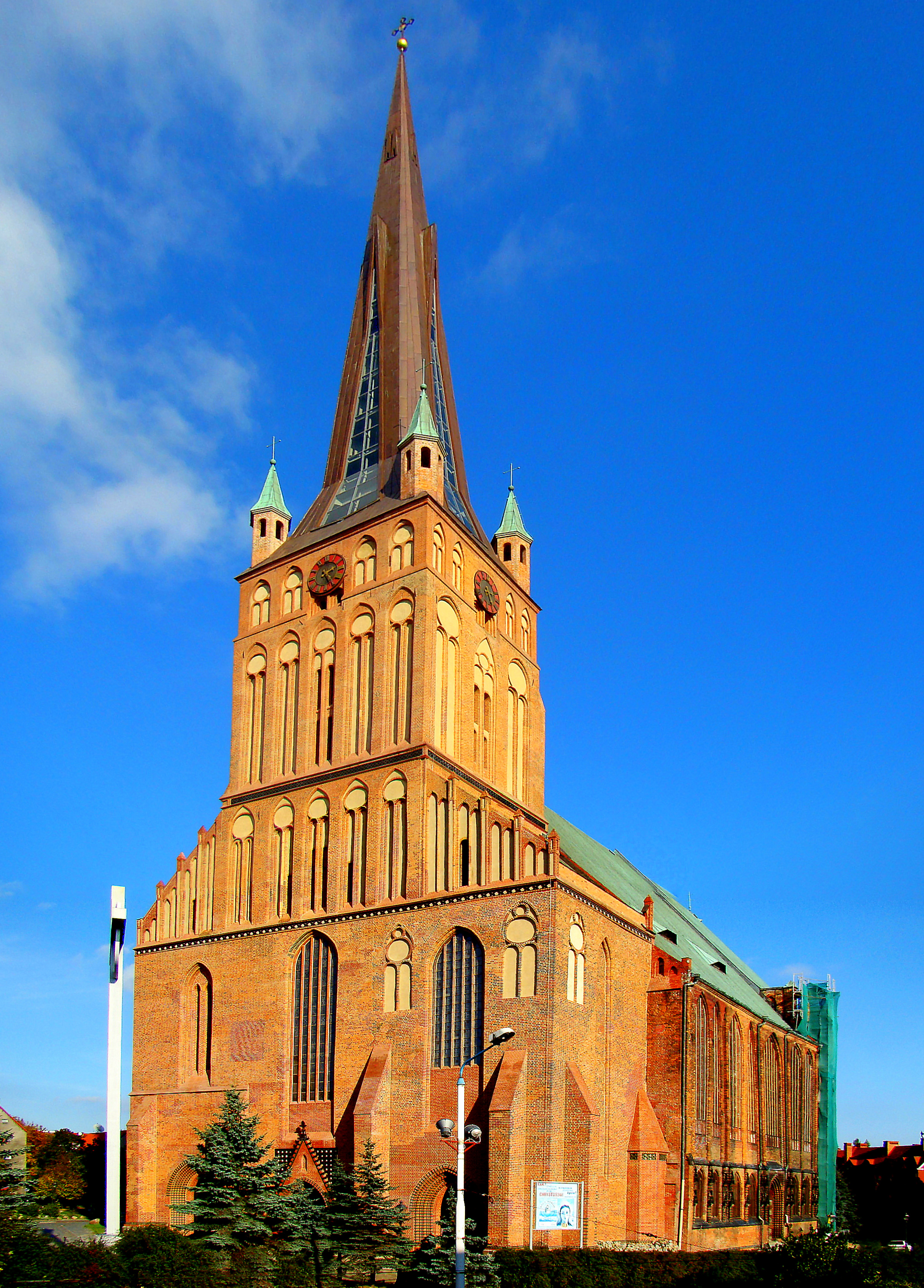
The seat of the Archdiocese of Szczecin-Kamień is Cathedral Basilica of St. James the Apostle.

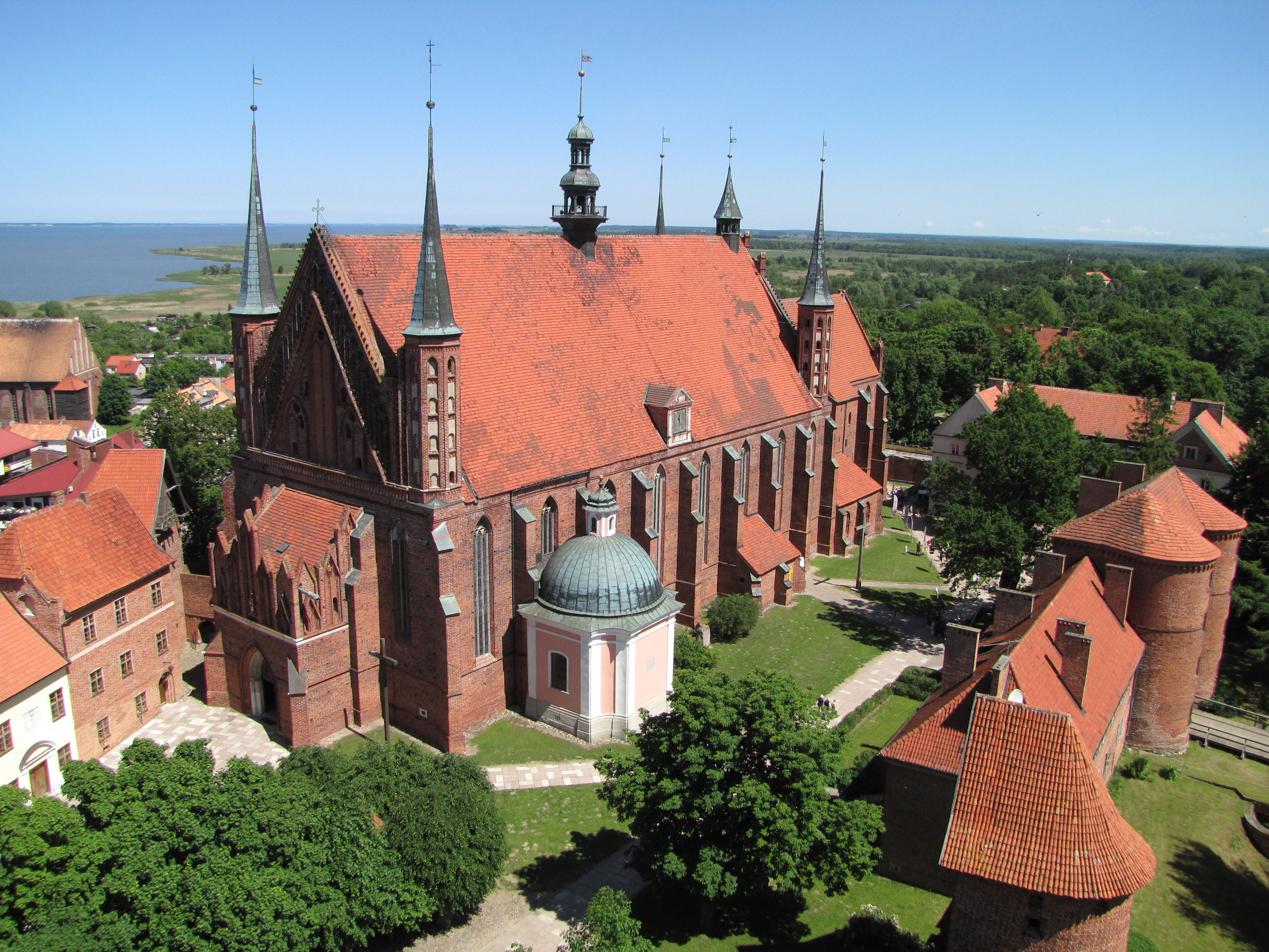
The seat of the Archdiocese of Warmia is Basilica of the Assumption of the Blessed Virgin Mary.

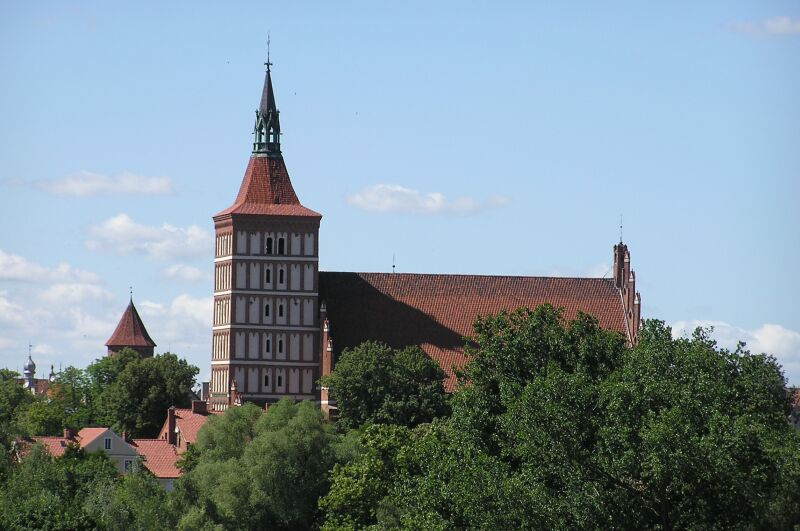
The co-seat of the Archdiocese of Warmia is Basilica of Saint James the Apostle.

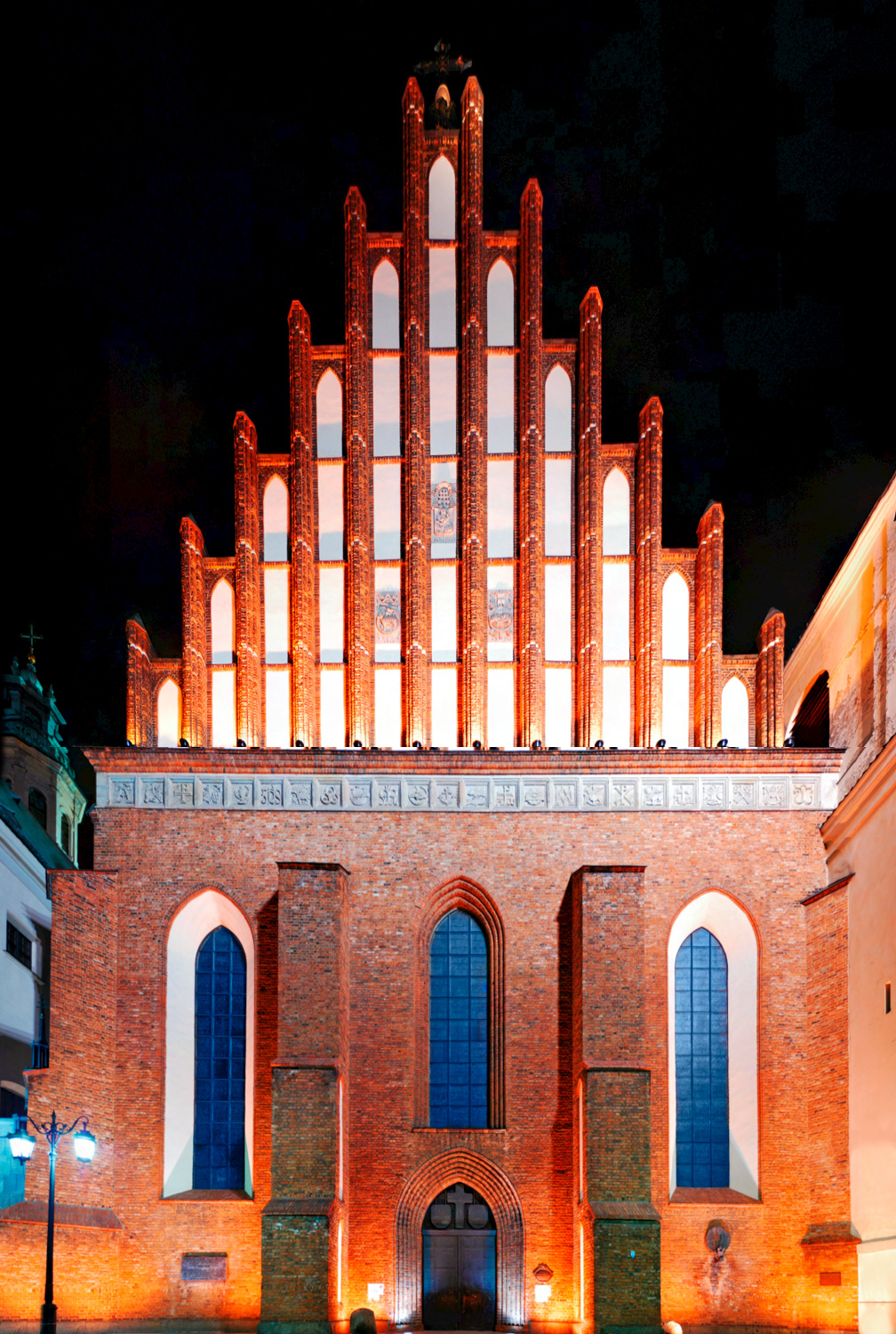
The seat of the Archdiocese of Warsaw is Cathedral Basilica of St. John the Baptist.

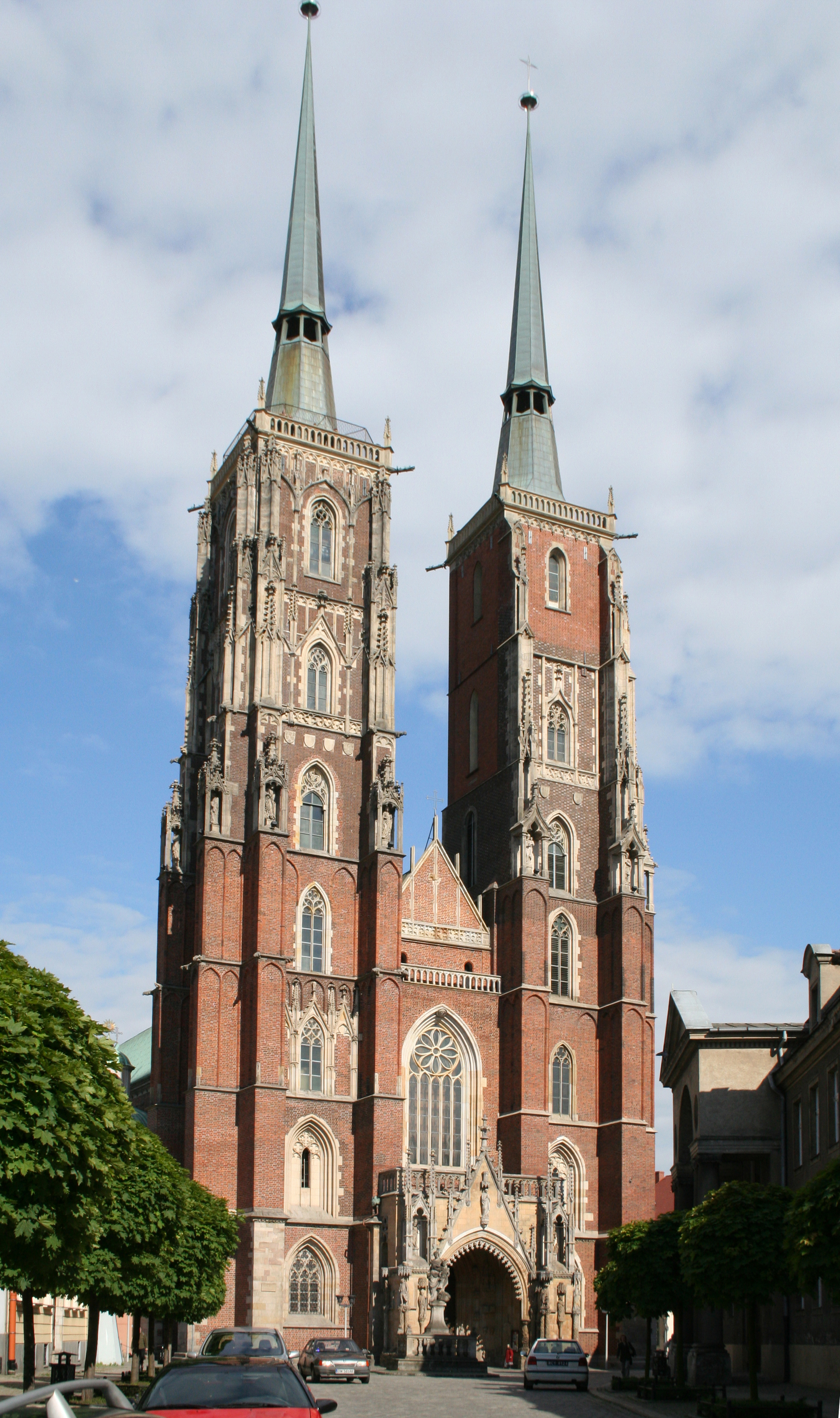
The seat of the Archdiocese of Wrocław is Cathedral of St. John the Baptist.

== See also ==
- Roman Catholicism in Poland
- Template: Roman Catholic dioceses of Poland

== Sources and external links ==
- GCatholic.org
- Catholic-Hierarchy entry.^{[self-published]}
- http://www.episkopat.pl/
