= Franciszek Barda =

Polish clergyman (1880–1964)

- Bishop of Przemyśl
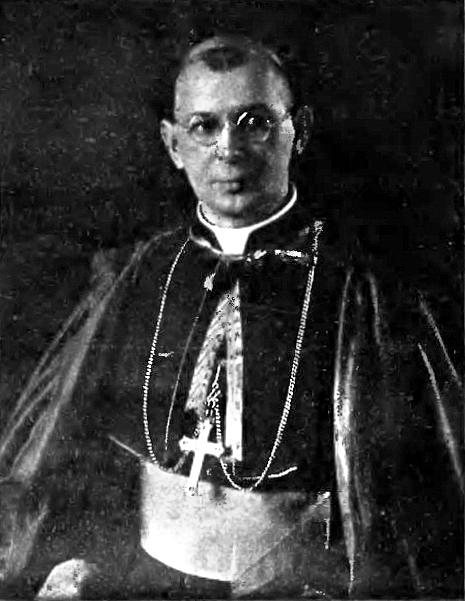
- Franciszek Barda in 1934
- Church: Roman Catholic Church
- Archdiocese: Archdiocese of Przemyśl
- In office: 1934 – 1964
- Predecessor: Anatol Nowak
- Successor: Ignacy Tokarczuk

Orders
- Ordination: 26 July 1904 by Jan Puzyna de Kosielsko
- Consecration: 30 August 1931 by Anatol Nowak
- Rank: Diocesan bishop

Personal details
- Born: 21 August 1880 Mszana Dolna, Austria-Hungary (now Poland)
- Died: November 13, 1964 (aged 84) Przemyśl, Poland

Franciszek Barda (21 August 1880, Mszana Dolna, Austria-Hungary (now Poland) – 13 November 1964, Przemyśl, Poland) was a Polish clergyman in the Catholic Church, doctor of theology, former rector for the Seminary of the Archdiocese of Kraków from 1930 to 1931, the auxiliary bishop of Przemyśl from 1931 to 1933 and the diocesan bishop of Przemyśl from 1934 to his death in 1964.

== Early life ==
He was born 21 August 1880, in Mszana Dolna. From 1892 to 1900 was a pupil at a small seminary in Kraków. During this time he studied at Jan III Sobieski High School and Bartłomiej Nowodworski High School. In 1900, he passed his maturity. He then studied at the Seminary of the Archdiocese of Kraków and in the Faculty of Theology at the Jagiellonian University. He was ordained as a priest on 26 July 1904 in Kraków by Cardinal Jan Puzyna de Kosielsko. In 1903, he continued his studies at the Gregorian University in Rome, from which he graduated in 1907, obtaining a doctorate in theology.

== Biography ==
Returning to Kraków, he was a vicar in his parish. He worked as a prefect in the High School of St. Anna and the female-only State High School in Kraków. From 1910 to 1914, he was the prefect and vice-rector of the Seminary of the Archdiocese of Kraków, and from 1919 to 1922, was a professor of moral theology at the Seminary in Poznań. From 1925 to 1928, he served as rector of the Polish Institute in Rome, and from 1930 to 1931, he held the office of the rector of the Seminary of Kraków.

On 10 July 1931, Pope Pius XI appointed Barda to be the Auxiliary Bishop of the Diocese of Przemyśl and the title of Medea. He was ordained a bishop on 30 August 1931 at the Przemyśl Cathedral. He was consecrated by the local diocesan Bishop Anatol Nowak who was assisted by Edward Komar, the Auxiliary Bishop of Tarnów, and Stanisław Rospond, the auxiliary bishop of Kraków. After the death of Nowak, on 5 April 1933 he was named the vicar of the diocese, and on 25 November 1933, was preconized as the diocesan bishop. On 21 January 1934, he began to reign in on the diocese. In 1936, he carried out a Eucharistic congress, which was attended by 100,000 faithful, and the 1955 synod, which codified the rights of the diocese. He erected around 100 new parishes whose churches were founded mainly in abandoned Greek Catholic churches. He created the Institute of Higher Religious Culture in Przemyśl and the Catholic People's University in Ujezna. An appointed head of a local branch of Caritas Internationalis, he supported the development of Catholic actions and supported the Catholic House in Przemyśl. Before the Invasion of Poland, starting World War II, he did not participate in political activities. At the end of the 1930s, however, he worked to reassure the radical mood of rural communities and youth organizations. During the German occupation, he kept an unbending attitude. In the post-war Polish People's Republic, the communist authorities considered him a dangerous opponent of the regime and the Soviet Union.

At the Polish Episcopal Conference, he was a member of the Committee for Social Affairs and the Foundation and Environmental Protection, and after World War II, he was a member of the Commission Headquarters. He participated in the Second Vatican Council. He consecrated many of the Auxiliary Bishops of Przemyśl: Wojciech Tomaka (1934), Stanisław Jakiel (1957), and pl:Bolesław Taborski (biskup) (1964), as well as the bishop Bolesław Kominek (1954). During his ordination as co auxiliary bishop, he was associated with the bishop of Tarnów, Michał Blecharczyk (1958), the bishop of Kraków Julian Groblicki (1960), and the archdiocesan bishop of Tarnów Jerzy Ablewicz (1962).

Barda died on 13 November 1964 in Przemyśl. He was, on 16 November 1964, buried in the basement of the local cathedral.

== Honours ==
In 1937, "for outstanding contribution in the field of social work", Barda was awarded the Commander's Cross of the Star of the Order of Polonia Restituta.
