= Roman Catholic Diocese of Zamość–Lubaczów =

Roman Catholic diocese in Poland

Coordinates: 50°42′59″N 23°15′01″E

Diocese of Zamość-Lubaczów Dioecesis Zamosciensis-Lubaczoviensis Diecezja Zamojsko-Lubaczowska

Catholic
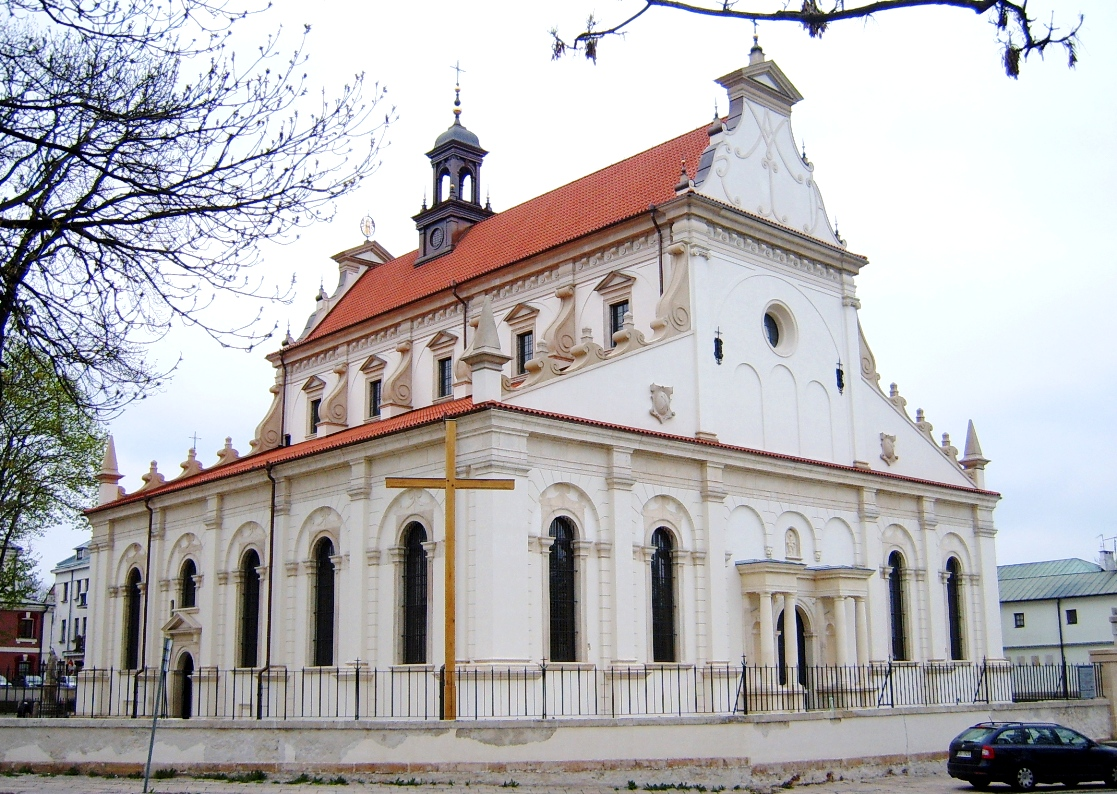
- Cathedral of the Resurrection and St Thomas the Apostle in Zamość

Location
- Country: Poland
- Ecclesiastical province: Przemyśl
- Metropolitan: Archdiocese of Przemyśl

Statistics
- Area: 8,144 km^{2} (3,144 sq mi)
- Population: Total; Catholics: (as of 2020); 471,000; 457,000 (97%)

Information
- Denomination: Catholic Church
- Rite: Latin Rite
- Established: 3 June 1991
- Cathedral: Katedra Zmartwychwstania Pańskiego i św. Tomasza Apostoła, Zamość (Cathedral of the Resurrection and St. Thomas the Apostle)
- Co-cathedral: Konkatedra św. Stanisława, Lubaczów (Co-Cathedral Shrine of St. Stanislaus)

Current leadership
- Pope: Leo XIV
- Bishop: Marian Rojek
- Metropolitan Archbishop: Adam Szal
- Auxiliary Bishops: Mariusz Leszczyński
- Bishops emeritus: Jan Śrutwa

Website
- Website of the Diocese

Map of Roman Catholic Diocese of Zamość-Lubaczów

The Diocese of Zamość-Lubaczów (Latin: Dioecesis Zamosciensis-Lubaczoviensis) is a suffragan Latin diocese of the Catholic Church in the ecclesiastical province of Przemyśl in Poland.

Its cathedral episcopal see is Katedra Zmartwychwstania Pańskiego i św. Tomasza Apostoła, a World Heritage Site dedicated to Resurrection and the St. Thomas the Apostle, in the city of Zamość, Lubelskie. It also has

- a Co-cathedral: Konkatedra św. Stanisława, dedicated to Saint Stanislaus, in Lubaczów, Podkarpackie
- a Minor Basilica: Bazylika św. Antoniego z Padwy, in Radecznica, Lubelskie
- a second World Heritage Site: Cerkiew św. Paraskewy, in Radruż, Podkarpackie.

== History ==
- 1991: Established as Apostolic Administration of Lubaczów, on territory split off from the Metropolitan Archdiocese of Lviv (in Ukraine)
- Promoted on 25 March 1992 as Diocese of Zamość – Lubaczów, having gained territory from the Diocese of Lublin
- Enjoyed Papal visits from the Polish Pope John Paul II in June 1991 and June 1999.

== Statistics ==
As per 2014, it pastorally served 462,586 Catholics (94.9% of 487,500 total) on 8,144 km^{2} in 185 parishes and 4 missions with 478 priests (451 diocesan, 27 religious), 173 lay religious (27 brothers, 146 sisters) and 45 seminarians.

== Episcopal ordinaries ==
(all Roman rite)

Suffragan Bishops of Zamość-Lubaczów

- Jan Śrutwa (25 March 1992 – retired 5 August 2006); previously Titular Bishop of Liberalia (1984.07.25 – 1992.03.25) as Auxiliary Bishop of Diocese of Lublin (Poland) (1984.07.25 – 1992.03.25)
- Wacław Depo (5 August 2006 – 29 December 2011), next Metropolitan Archbishop of Częstochowa (Poland) (2011.12.29 – ...)
- Marian Rojek (30 June 2012 – ... ), previously Titular Bishop of Tisedi (2005.12.21 – 2012.06.30) as Auxiliary Bishop of Archdiocese of Przemyśl (Poland) (2005.12.21 – 2012.06.30).

== See also ==
- List of Catholic dioceses in Poland
- Roman Catholicism in Poland

== Sources and external links ==
- GCatholic.org - data for all sections
- Catholic Hierarchy
- Diocese website
