= Vyshchi Lubianky =

Rural locality in Ternopil Oblast, Ukraine

Vyshchi Lubianky Вищі Луб'янки
- Location in Ternopil Oblast
- Coordinates: 49°39′35″N 25°51′30″E
- Country: Ukraine
- Oblast: Ternopil Oblast
- Raion: Ternopil Raion
- Hromada: Zbarazh urban hromada
- Time zone: UTC+2 (EET)
  - Summer (DST): UTC+3 (EEST)
- Postal code: 47362

Vyshchi Lubianky (Ukrainian: Вищі Луб'янки) is a village in the Zbarazh urban hromada of the Ternopil Raion of Ternopil Oblast in Ukraine.

== History ==
The first written mention of the village was in 1463.

After the liquidation of the Zbarazh Raion on 19 July 2020, the village became part of the Ternopil Raion.

== Religion ==
- Church of the Nativity of the Blessed Virgin Mary (1880, brick),
- Spiritual center (2000).

== Notable residents ==
- Ignacy Tokarczuk (1918–2012), Polish prelate of the Roman Catholic Church

== Sources ==
- (in Ukrainian) Бучак Я., Уніят В., Вищі Луб'янки // Ternopil Encyclopedic Dictionary: in 4 v. / editorial board: H. Yavorskyi and other, Ternopil: "Zbruch", 2004, V. 1: А—Й, S. 271–272. — ISBN 966-528-197-6.
- "Łubianki Wyżne". Geographical Dictionary of the Kingdom of Poland (in Polish). 5. Warszawa: Kasa im. Józefa Mianowskiego. 1884. p. 772.
