= Adam Szal =

21st-century Polish Catholic bishop

Mgr. Adam Szal
- Archbishop of Przemyśl
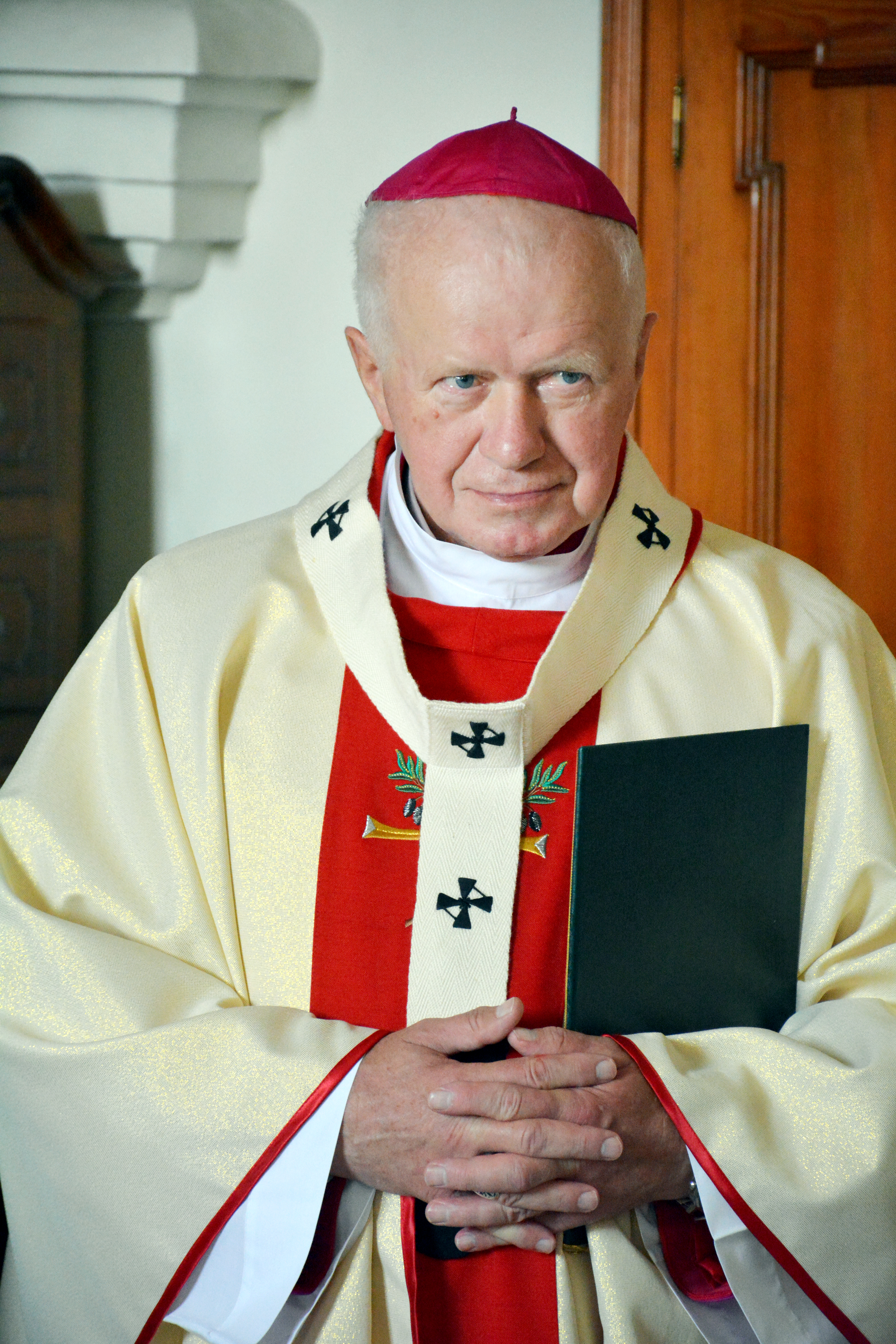
- Szal in 2024
- Church: Roman Catholic Church
- Archdiocese: Przemyśl
- In office: 2016 –
- Predecessor: Józef Michalik
- Previous posts: Auxiliary Bishop of Przemyśl; Titular Bishop of Lavellum

Orders
- Ordination: 31 May 1979 by Ignacy Tokarczuk
- Consecration: 23 December 2000 by Józef Michalik
- Rank: Archbishop

Personal details
- Born: 24 December 1953 (age 72) Wysoka, Poland
- Motto: Gloria Tibi Trinitas
- Coat of arms

Adam Jan Szal (born 24 December 1953) is a Polish Roman Catholic bishop, being the archbishop of the Roman Catholic Archdiocese of Przemyśl since 2016. He was previously the auxiliary bishop of the Przemyśl and titular bishop of Lavellum.

== Biography ==
=== Early life ===
Szal was born on December 24, 1953, in the village of Wysoka. He studied at the local Technical School of Agricultural Accountancy. In 1972 he was admitted to the Major Seminary in Przemyśl. During his studies he did basic military service in the clerical unit in Bartoszyce. He was ordained a priest on 31 May 1979 at the Przemyśl Cathedral by diocesan bishop Ignacy Tokarczuk. In Szal obtained a master's degree in theology at the Catholic University of Lublin in 1980, continued his studies in the history of the Church, graduating in 1990 with a doctorate based on the dissertation of the Clergy of the Przemyśl diocese of Latin Rite in 1918–1939.

=== Priestly ministry ===
From 1979 to 1982 Szal served as a pastor in the village of Lutcza, from 1982 to 1984 he was the pastor in the Holy Trinity parish in Krosno, and from 1987 to 1988 he was the pastor of the Holy Spirit parish in Przeworsk. In 1988 he became the director of the Library of the Higher Theological Seminary in Przemyśl and a lecturer in the history of the Church at the Theological Institute in Przemyśl. From 1991 to 1996 Szal was the prefect of the alumni of the Przemyśl seminary, and from 1996 to 2001 he was the rector of the university. In 1999 he became the canon lawyer of the archdiocese, and in 2005 he became the provost.

=== Ordination as bishop ===
On 16 November 2000 Szal was appointed as the auxiliary bishop of the Przemyśl and titular bishop of Lavellum by Pope John Paul II. On 23 December 2000 Szal was ordained a bishop by Józef Michalik, the Archbishop of Przemyśl, with Stefan Moskwa and Edward Eugeniusz Bialoglowski serving as the co-consicrators. On 30 April 2016 Szal was promoted by Pope Francis to be the next archbishop of Przemyśl to replace the retiring Michalik. He took office canonically on 11 May 2016 while the formal inauguration at the Przemyśl Cathedral took place on 21 May 2016.

=== Life as Bishop ===
During the COVID-19 pandemic in Poland Szal cancelled all the planned First Communion events planned to take place in March and April, as well as all other public celebrations. Only private masses would be allowed in the archdiocese during that time period. On 1 April 2020 Szal recommended that the priest in the archdiocese of Przemyśl to donate half their income back to their parishes to help combat the economic troubles caused by the coronavirus.

During the 2022 Russian invasion of Ukraine, he stopped at the local train station to personally greet some of the incoming refugees from Ukraine; Poland shares a long border with the country and is receiving a significant number of them, along with Romania, Hungary, Bulgaria, and Moldova. Caritas in Poland and the Knights of Malta are trying to help them.
