= Józef Michalik =

Polish Roman Catholic archbishop (1941–2026)

His Excellency Józef Michalik
- Archbishop Emeritus of Przemyśl
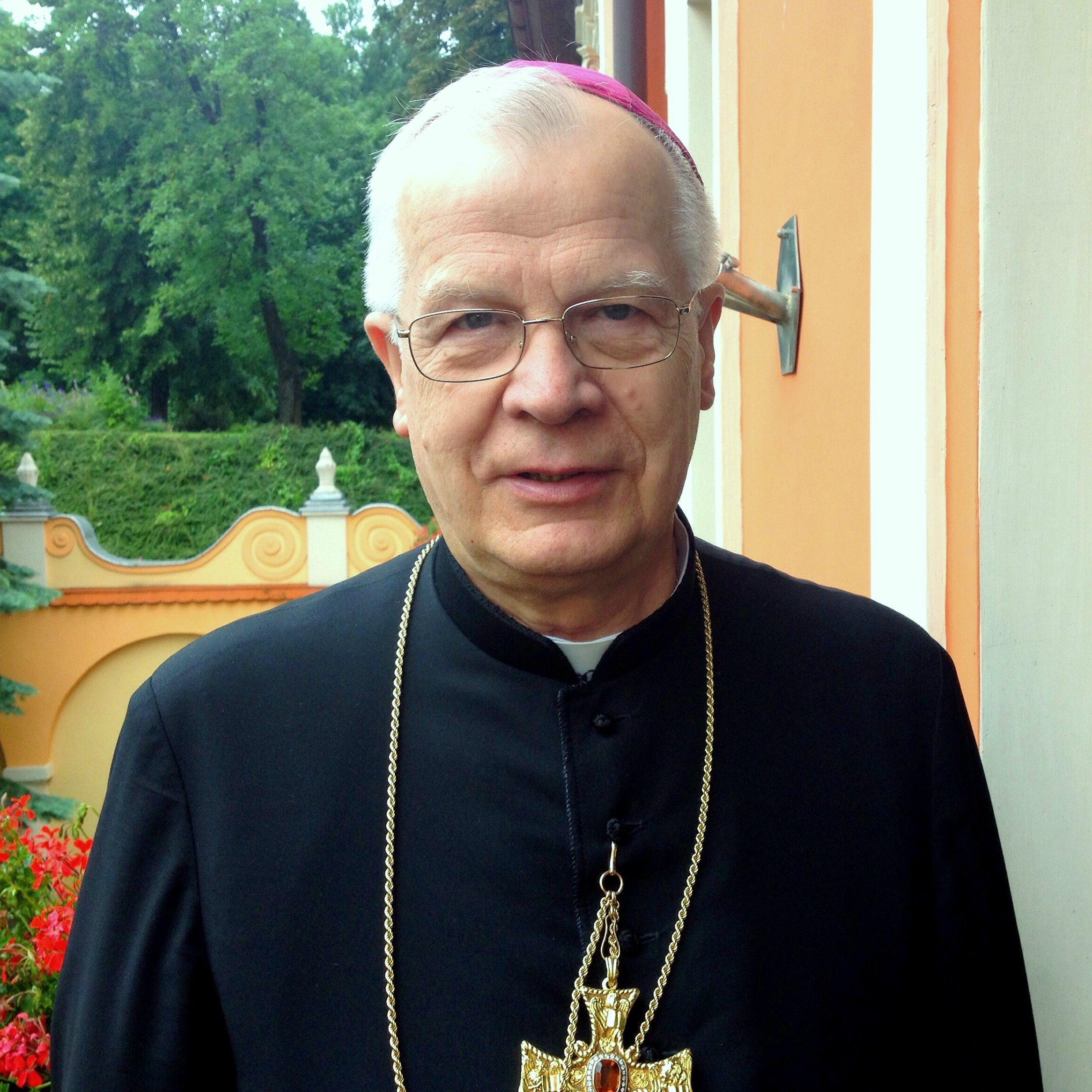
- Michalik in 2014
- Archdiocese: Archdiocese of Przemyśl
- Appointed: 17 April 1993
- Installed: 2 May 1993
- Term ended: 30 April 2016
- Predecessor: Ignacy Tokarczuk
- Successor: Adam Szal
- Other posts: President of the Polish Episcopal Conference (2004–2014); Vice-President of the Council of Episcopal Conferences of Europe (2011–2014)
- Previous post: Bishop of Gorzów (1986–1993)

Orders
- Ordination: 23 May 1964 by Czeslaw Falkowski
- Consecration: 16 October 1986 by Pope John Paul II

Personal details
- Born: 20 April 1941 Zambrów, Belastok Region, Byelorussian SSR, USSR (now Poland)
- Died: 3 May 2026 (aged 85) Przemyśl, Poland
- Motto: Numine Tuo Domine
- Coat of arms: Józef Michalik's coat of arms

Styles of Józef Michalik
- Reference style: His Excellency; The Most Reverend
- Spoken style: Your Excellency
- Religious style: Bishop

Józef Michalik (20 April 1941 – 3 May 2026) was a Polish Roman Catholic bishop, the diocesan Bishop of the Zielona Góra-Gorzów diocese in 1986–1993 (to 1992 of Gorzów), Archbishop of Przemyśl in 1993–2016, and the president of the Polish Episcopal Conference in 2004–2014.

== Biography ==
In the years 1958–1964, he studied at a Seminary in Łomża where he was ordained a priest on 23 May 1964. He studied dogmatic theology at Warsaw Theological Academy and later at the Pontifical University of St. Thomas Aquinas (Angelicum) in Rome, where in 1972, he received a doctorate in theology. In 1973, he was appointed vice-chancellor of the diocesan curia in Łomża. In October 1985, he became head of the Office of Youth Affairs at the Pontifical Council for the Laity.

On 1 October 1986, he was appointed bishop of the diocese of Gorzów. On 16 October 1986, in the Vatican he was ordained bishop by Pope John Paul II. On 25 March 1992, after the reorganization of structures of the dioceses in Poland, Michalik was appointed the first diocesan bishop of the Diocese of Zielona Góra-Gorzów.

On 17 April 1993, he was appointed Archbishop of Przemyśl the Latin rite. On 2 May 1993, he made an ingres (ingressus) at the Cathedral of Przemyśl.

In the Polish Episcopal Conference for 10 years Michalik served as: Chairman of the Committee for the Pastoral Care of the academic vice-president of the Commission for the Pastoral Care of the General and president of the Commission for the Pastoral Care of the Laity. He was chairman of the CEP for Polonia and Poles Abroad. In 1999, he was deputy chairman of the Polish Episcopal Conference. On 18 March 2004 he was elected chairman of the Polish Episcopal Conference, re-elected for a second term on 10 March 2009.

In 1994, he was elected chairman of the Commission for the Laity in the Council of European Episcopal Conferences (CCEE). On 30 September 2011 at the plenary meeting of the Council of Episcopal Conferences of Europe (CCEE) in Tirana he was elected Vice-president CCEE.

From 1990, he was a consultor of the Pontifical Council for the Laity, and a member of the Congregation for Bishops.

In 2002, he was awarded the Polonia Mater Nostra Est.

The changes in approach taken by Pope Francis, with calls for tolerance of homosexuals and for Church officials to adopt a more humble lifestyle, have caused some difficulty between the media and the conservative Polish Church. In a sermon in 2013 at Jasna Góra Monastery Michalik said "All the anti-Church media try to persuade us that the main theme of Pope Francis's pronouncements is the wealth of the Church ... They obviously want to use the Pope to battle the Church."

He often appeared on Radio Maryja and the diocesan radio station Radio Parish Church of the Archdiocese of Przemysl. He was a regular feature writer of the Catholic weekly magazine "Friday".

Michalik died on 3 May 2026, at the age of 85.

== Controversies ==
In 2009, Michalik was linked to case of relegation of a policeman who gave him a speeding ticket.

On 15 February 2007, Michalik, in an interview with Polish TV, Polish Press Agency PAP, IAR and the IAC, has reported that the Church Historical Commission on the basis of materials established by the Institute of National Remembrance IPN found that during the years 1975 to 1978 he was registered as an agent of the Communist secret police (SB) codenamed "Zephyr". The commission on the basis of available materials also recognized that there is no basis to determine the nature of his actual work.

In 2013, responding to reports of a succession of child sex abuse scandals, Michalik said "Often that inappropriate approach or abuse is released when the child is looking for love. It clings, it seeks. It loses itself and also draws in that second person." This comment was heavily criticised, and Michalik called a news conference to apologise, stating that he did not blame children who were victims of abuse.

In October 2013, Michalik's online biography was discovered to contain an incorrect claim of an award granted by Cambridge University.

Catholic Church titles
Preceded by Ignacy Tokarczuk	Archbishop of Przemyśl; 1993–2016	Succeeded by Adam Szal
Preceded by Wilhelm Pluta	Bishop of Gorzów; 1986–1993	Succeeded by Adam Dyczkowski
