= Stefan Moskwa =

Stefan Moskwa (September 27, 1935 in Wola Mala – October 18, 2004 in Przemysl) was a Polish Roman Catholic priest, Doctor of Theology, rector of the Higher Seminary in Przemyśl in 1976–1986, auxiliary Bishop of Przemyśl 1984–2004.

Stefan Moskwa was also the Bishop of the titular see of Giru Mons in Algeria.
