= Ignacy Tokarczuk =

Polish prelate

His Excellency Ignacy Tokarczuk
- Archbishop of Przemyśl
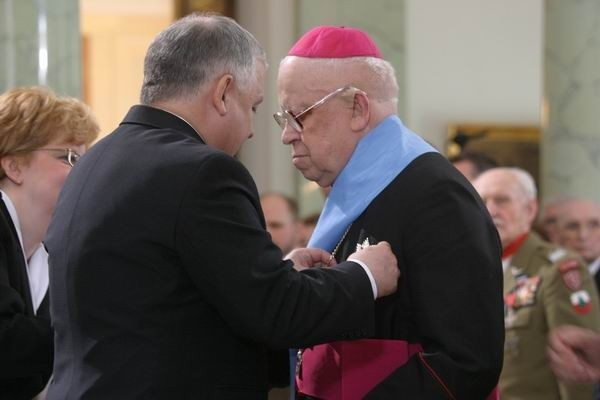
- Church: Roman Catholic Church
- See: Archdiocese of Przemyśl
- In office: 1965 - 1993
- Predecessor: Franciszek Barda
- Successor: Józef Michalik
- Previous post: Priest in Łebuniap.70

Orders
- Ordination: 21 June 1942 by Eugeniusz Baziak
- Consecration: 6 February 1966 by Stefan Wyszyński

Personal details
- Born: 1 February 1918 Łubianki Wyższe, Poland
- Died: 29 December 2012 (aged 94) Przemyśl, Poland

Ignacy Tokarczuk (1 February 1918 – 29 December 2012) was a Polish prelate of the Roman Catholic Church.

== Biography ==
Tokarczuk was born in Łubianki Wyższe near Tarnopol. He was ordained a priest by Bishop Eugeniusz Baziak in Lvov on 21 June 1942. On 2 December 1965 he was appointed a Bishop of the Diocese of Przemyśl, and was consecrated by Cardinal Stefan Wyszyński on 6 February 1966. On 2 June 1991 Tokarczuk was bestowed a personal title of archbishop by John Paul II. On 25 March 1992 he became a metropolitan Archbishop of Przemyśl. As the Bishop of Przemysl, he was known for building a great number of churches in his diocese despite the lack of having permission to build from the communist authorities. It is said that he has erected nearly 430 churches during his tenure as a bishop. He was also a great supporter of the Solidarity movement. For his uncompromising stance in the defense of the institution of the Catholic Church in the People's Republic of Poland, he was repeatedly harassed by the Polish Security Service. Tokarczuk retired from the Archdiocese of Przemyśl on 17 April 1993 and was succeeded by Archbishop Józef Michalik.

Tokarczuk was also a recipient of the Order of White Eagle, and from 2007 to 2009, he was a member of the Grand Chapter of the Order.

== See also ==
- Archdiocese of Przemyśl
