= Archdiocese of Przemyśl =

Latin Catholic archdiocese in Poland

Coordinates: 49°46′52″N 22°46′05″E

Archdiocese of Przemyśl Archidioecesis Premisliensis Latinorum Archidiecezja Przemyska

Catholic
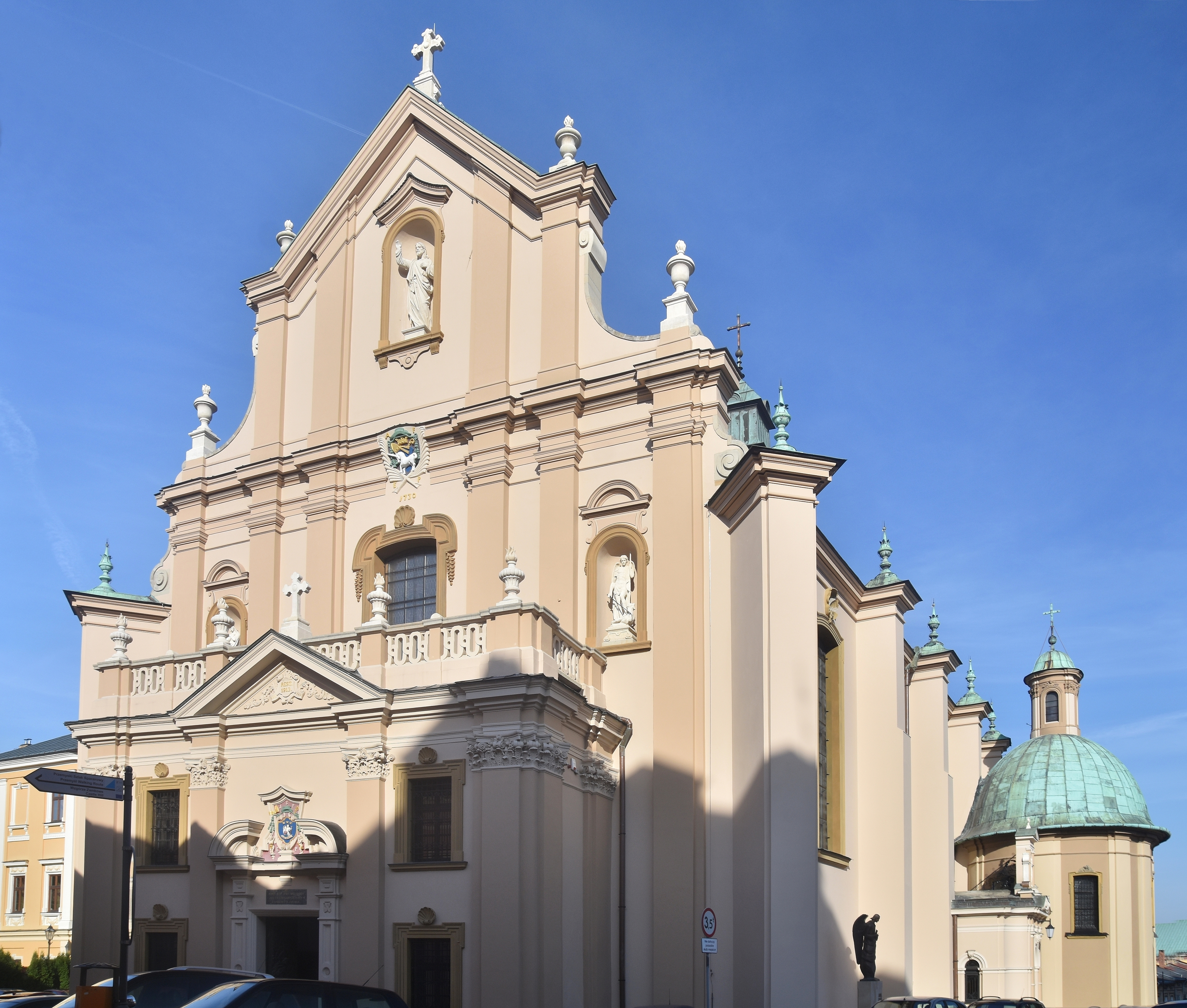
- Cathedral Basilica of the Assumption and St John the Baptist in Przemyśl

Location
- Country: Poland

Statistics
- Area: 9,750 km^{2} (3,760 sq mi)
- Population: Total; Catholics: (as of 2019); 814,000; 735,000 (90.3%)

Information
- Denomination: Catholic Church
- Sui iuris church: Latin Church
- Rite: Roman Rite
- Cathedral: Bazylika Archikatedralna Wniebowzięcia Najświętszej; Marii Panny i św. Jana Chrzciciela (Cathedral Basilica of the Assumption of the Blessed Virgin Mary and St. John the Baptist)

Current leadership
- Pope: Leo XIV
- Metropolitan Archbishop: Adam Szal
- Auxiliary Bishops: Stanislaw Jamrozek; Krzysztof Chudzio

Map

Website
- Website of the Archdiocese

The Archdiocese of Przemyśl (Latin: Archidioecesis Premisliensis Latinorum) is a Latin Church ecclesiastical jurisdiction or archdiocese of the Catholic Church located in the city of Przemyśl in Poland.

== History ==
- April 13, 1375: Established as Diocese of Przemyśl
- March 25, 1992: Promoted as Metropolitan Archdiocese of Przemyśl

== Special churches ==
- Minor Basilicas:
  - Cathedral Basilica of the Assumption of the Blessed Virgin Mary and St. John the Baptist, Przemyśl
  - Basilica of Our Lady of Sorrows, Jarosław
  - Collegiate Basilica of the Holy Spirit, Przeworsk
  - Collegiate Basilica of the Holy Trinity, Krosno
  - Basilica of the Annunciation, Leżajsk
  - Basilica of the Assumption of the Blessed Virgin Mary, Stara Wieś
  - Collegiate Basilica of the Transfiguration of the Lord, Brzozów
  - Basilica of the Finding of the Holy Cross, Kalwaria Pacławska

== Leadership ==
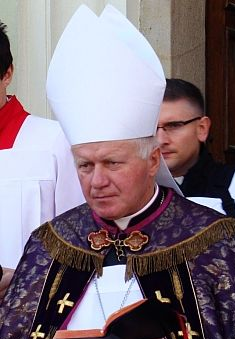
Archbishop Adam Szal, 2012

- Archbishops of Przemyśl (Roman rite)
  - Archbishop Adam Szal (since 2016.05.21)
  - Archbishop Józef Michalik (1993.04.17 – 2016.04.30)
  - Archbishop Ignacy Tokarczuk (1992.03.25 – 1993.04.17)
- Bishops of Przemyśl (Roman rite)
  - Archbishop Ignacy Tokarczuk (1965.12.03 – 1992.03.25)
  - Bishop Franciszek Barda (1933.11.25 – 1964.11.13)
  - Bishop Anatol Nowak (1924.09.30 – 1933.04.05)
  - Bishop Józef Sebastian Pelczar (1900.12.17 – 1924.03.28)
  - Bishop Luca Solecki (1882.03.27 – ?)
  - Bishop Mattia Hirschler (1870.06.27 – 1881)
  - Bishop Adam Jasiński (1860.03.23 – 1862.03.03)
  - Archbishop Franciszek Ksawery Wierzchleyski (1846.07.27 – 1860.03.23)
  - Bishop Józef Tadeusz Kierski (1768–1783)
  - Bishop Andrzej Stanisław Młodziejowski (1766.12.01 – 1768.05.16)
  - Bishop Walenty Franciszek Wężyk (1765–1766)
  - Archbishop Wacław Hieronim Sierakowski (1742.05.25 – 1760.07.21)
  - Bishop Waclaw Hieronim Sierakowski (1741–1760)
  - Bishop Alexander Antoni Pleszowice Fredro (1724–1734)
  - Bishop Krzysztof Andrzej Jan Szembek (1719.03.15 – 1724.09.11)
  - Bishop Jan Kazimierz de Alten Bokum (1701.07.18 – 1719.07.30)
  - Bishop Jan Stanisław Zbąski (1677.10.11 – 1688.12.06)
  - Bishop Piotr Gembicki (1636.09.22 – 1642.11.10)
  - Bishop Andrzej Szołdrski (1635.08.14 – 1636.07.21)
  - Archbishop Jan Wężyk (1619–1627)
  - Archbishop Wojciech Baranowski (1585–1591)

== Suffragan dioceses ==
- Rzeszów
- Zamość-Lubaczów

== See also ==
- Roman Catholicism in Poland

== Sources ==
- GCatholic.org
- Catholic Hierarchy
- Diocese website
