= Przemyśl Cathedral =

Roman Catholic cathedral in Przemyśl, Poland

Coordinates: 49°46′51″N 22°46′7″E

Cathedral Basilica of the Assumption of the Blessed Virgin Mary and St. John the Baptist Bazylika archikatedralna Wniebowzięcia Najświętszej Maryi Panny i św. Jana Chrzciciela w Przemyślu
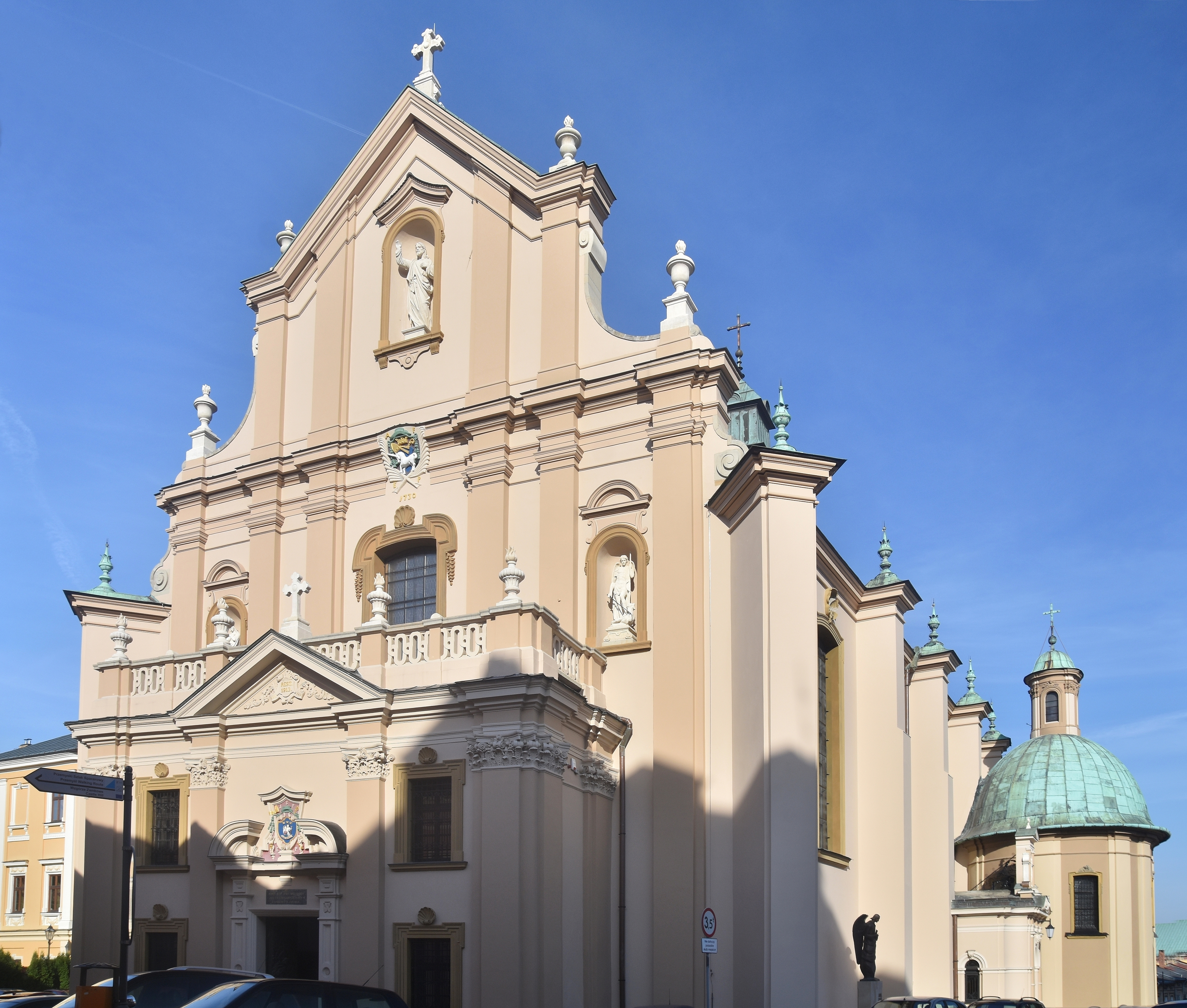

Religion
- Affiliation: Catholic Church
- Diocese: Old Town
- Province: Archdiocese of Przemyśl

Location
- Location: Przemyśl, Poland
- Interactive map of Cathedral Basilica of the Assumption of the Blessed Virgin Mary and St. John the Baptist; Bazylika archikatedralna Wniebowzięcia Najświętszej Maryi Panny i św. Jana Chrzciciela w Przemyślu

Architecture
- Style: Gothic, Baroque
- Completed: 15th century

not to be confused with the Cathedral of St. John the Baptist, Przemyśl

The Cathedral of Przemyśl, officially the Cathedral Basilica of the Assumption of the Blessed Virgin Mary and St. John the Baptist in Przemyśl (Polish: Bazylika archikatedralna Wniebowzięcia Najświętszej Maryi Panny i św. Jana Chrzciciela w Przemyślu), is a Latin Catholic cathedral in Przemyśl, Poland. It is the main church of the Archdiocese of Przemyśl, located at the Cathedral Square in the Old Town.

== History ==
The first cathedral of the diocese was a wooden church which existed from 1375 to 1412, standing in the square beside the present church of the Sacred Heart of Jesus. From 1412 to 1460, a Ruthenian Orthodox cathedral built of stone stood in the courtyard of Przemyśl Castle, which it was strongly associated with.

Construction of the present cathedral in the Gothic style began with the chapter of Bishop Nicholas Błażejowski in 1495. Only the walls and pillars remain from this building. The reconstruction was completed in the first decades of the sixteenth century. In 1578 the mayor of Przemysl, Secretary of the Crown – Jan Tomasz Drohojowski (d. 1605), founded the present chapel of the Blessed Sacrament. Founded on the site earlier rotunda St. Nicholas. Because of the continuous threat of incursions of the Tartars and Wallachians, it is a fortified church, surrounded by a wall and is equipped with a cannon. It is currently the seat of Archbishop Adam Szal.

== Interior ==
In the chancel are the stone foundations of the late Romanesque rotunda of the first half of the thirteenth century cathedral. The seventeenth-century Gothic cathedral served the bishops of Przemysl to the beginning of the eighteenth century. Bishop Aleksander Antoni Fredro decided to rebuild in the Baroque style; these works were performed in the years 1724–1744. In the chancel of the Great Altar was placed huge baroque and new stalls. There are two domed chapels. One of them is Drohojowski chapel of 1578, and the other one is the late baroque Fredro chapel built in 1724. Bishop of Przemysl Aleksander Antoni Fredro (coat of arms Bończa; 1674–1734) influenced the last one.

In 1733 the roof collapsed, destroying part of church and was rebuilt afterwards and completed in 1744. At the turn of the 19th century there was another rebuilding, restoring the oldest parts of the church, in a Gothic style.

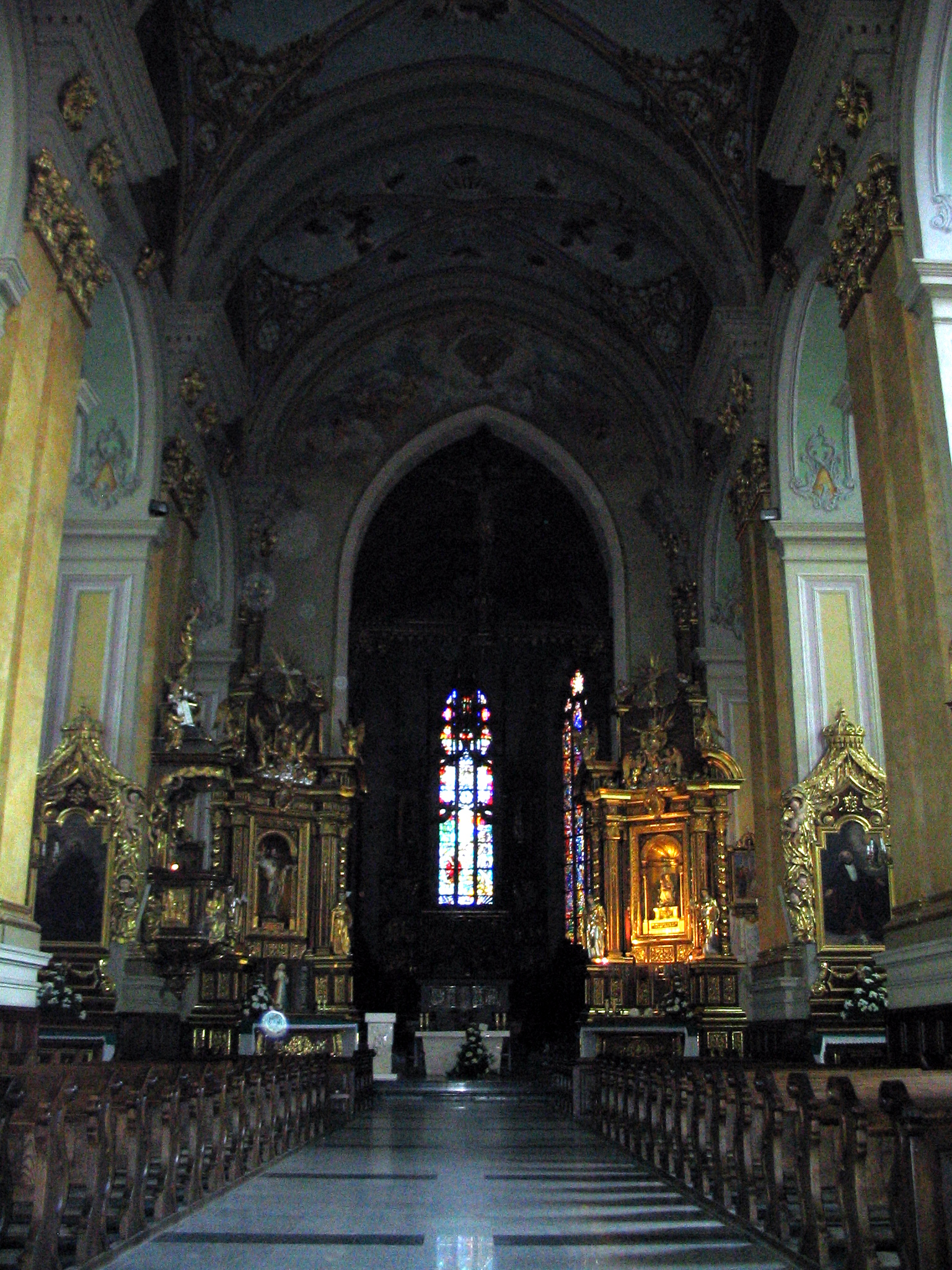
Aisle

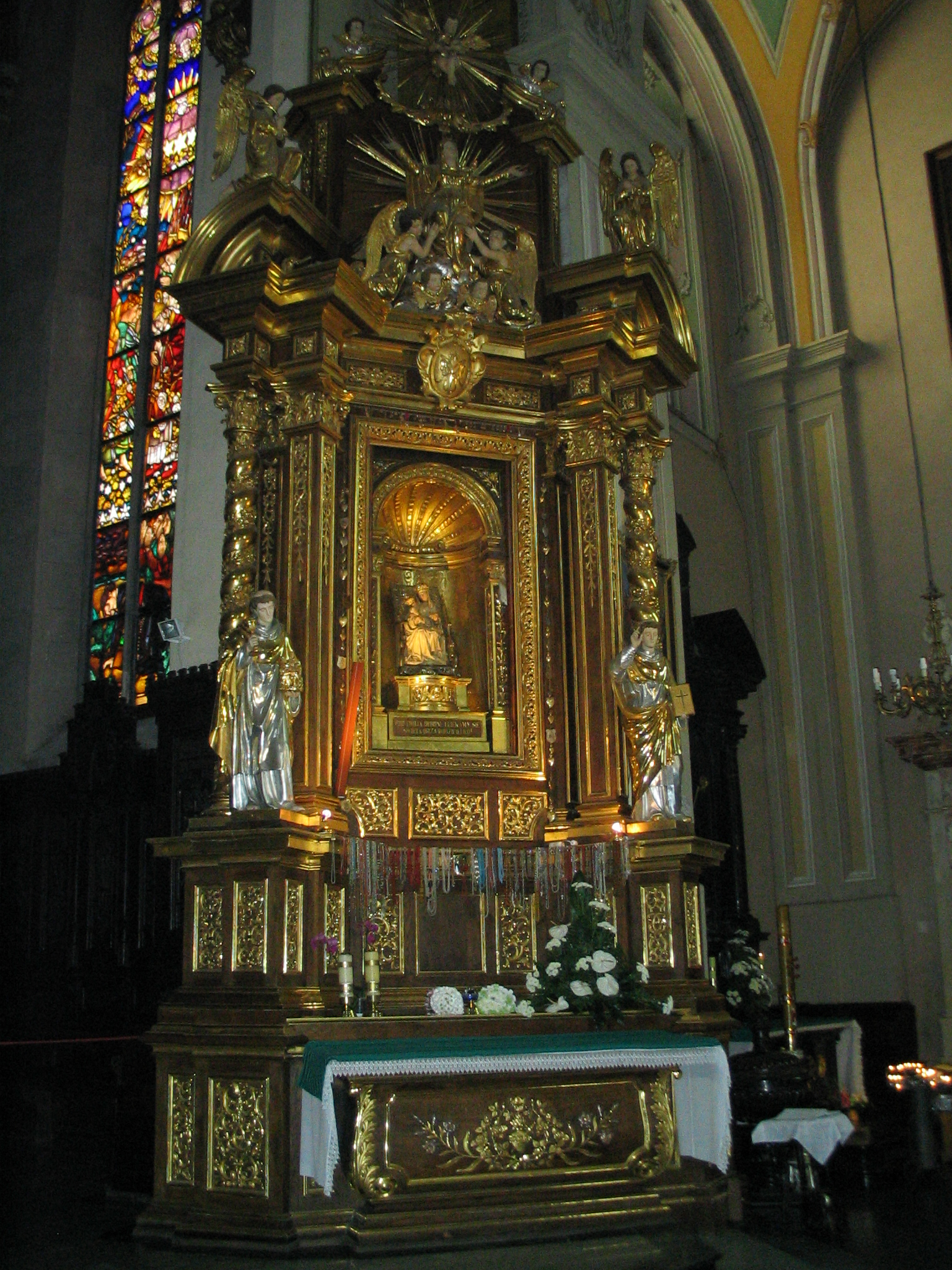
The main altar

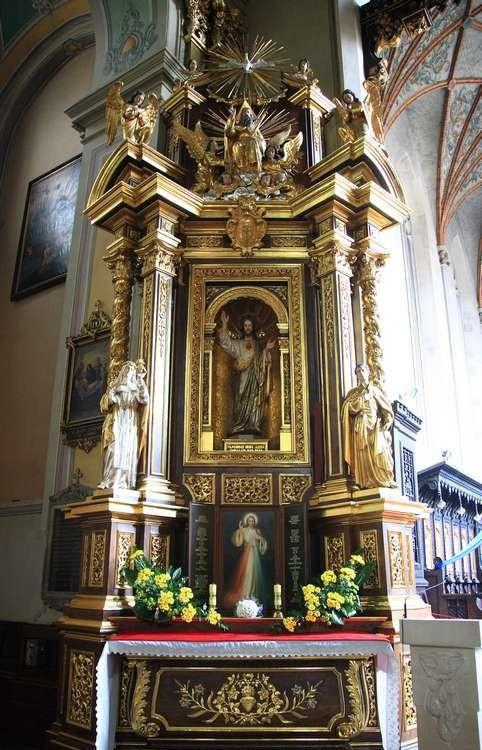
Side altar

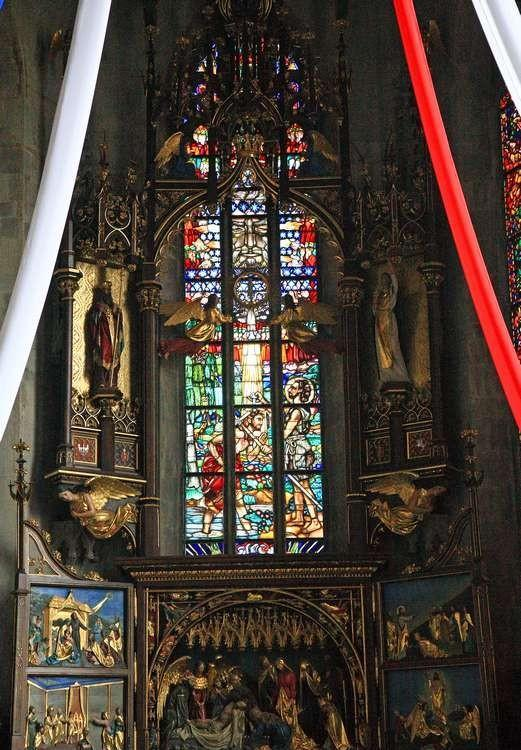
Stained glass window above the main altar

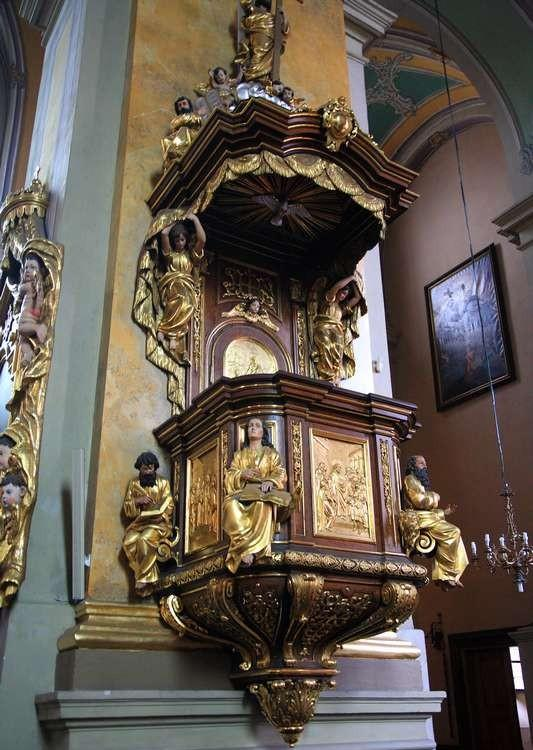
Pulpit

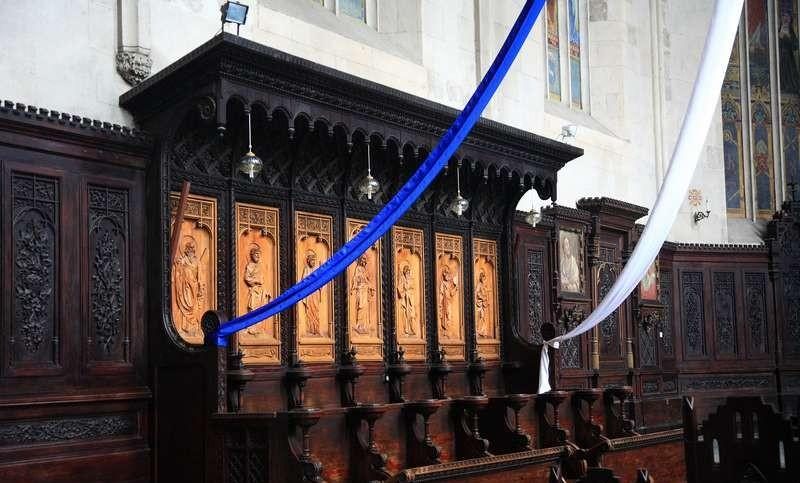
Stalls

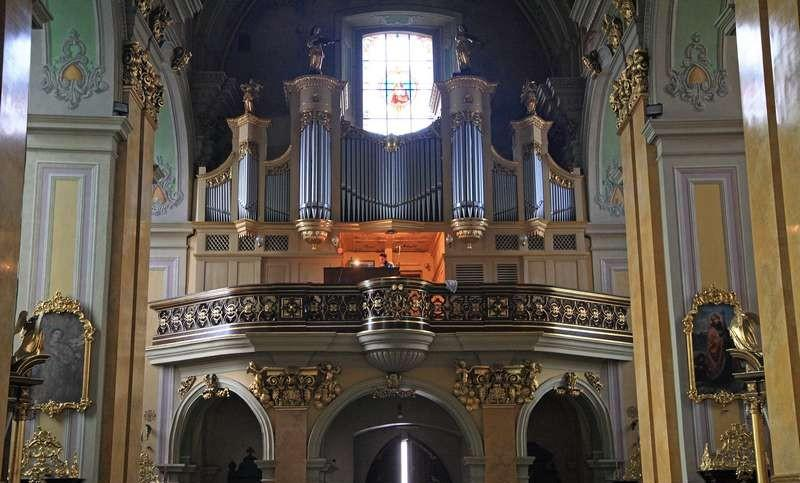
Organ

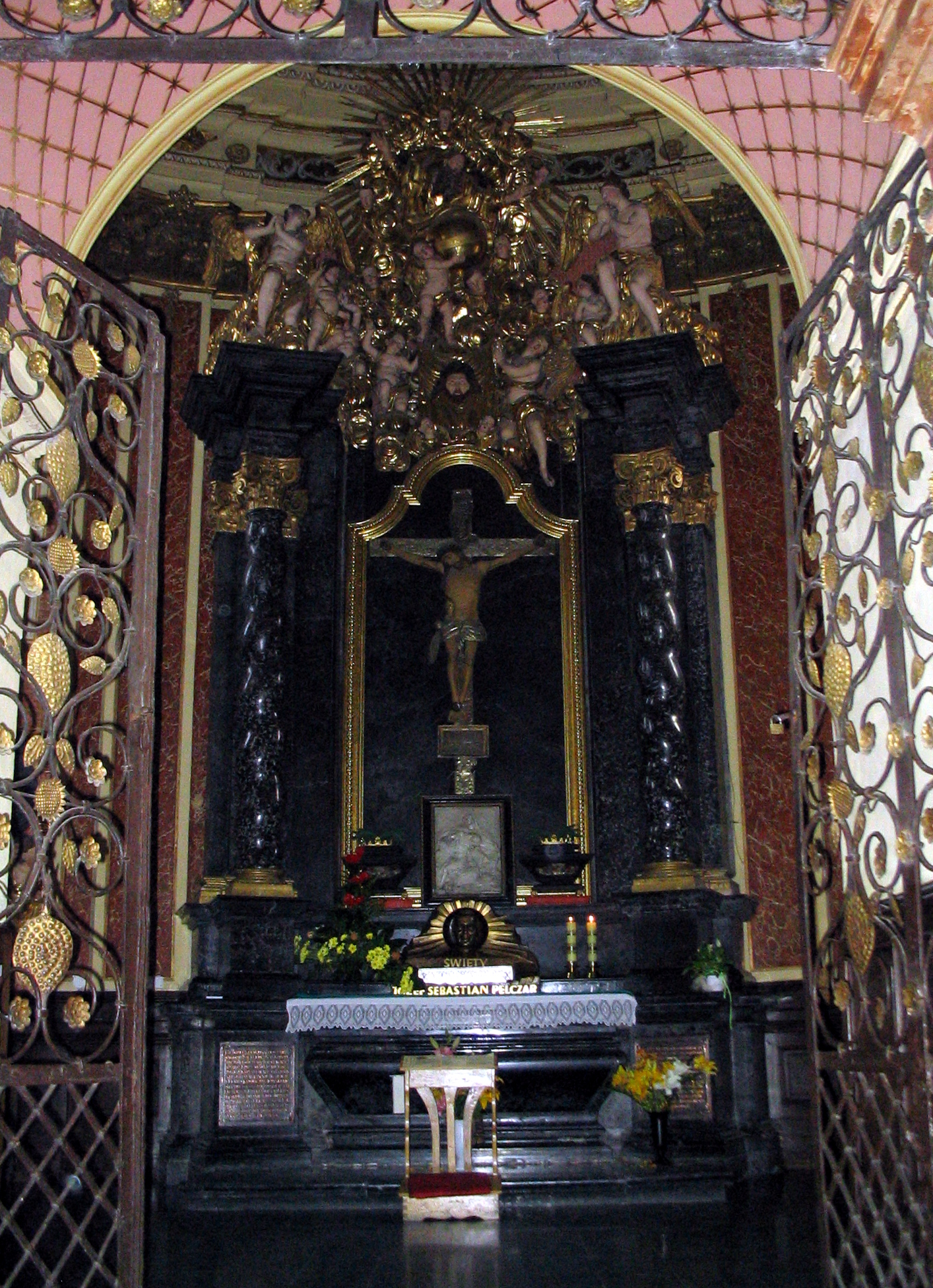
Kaplica Fredrów

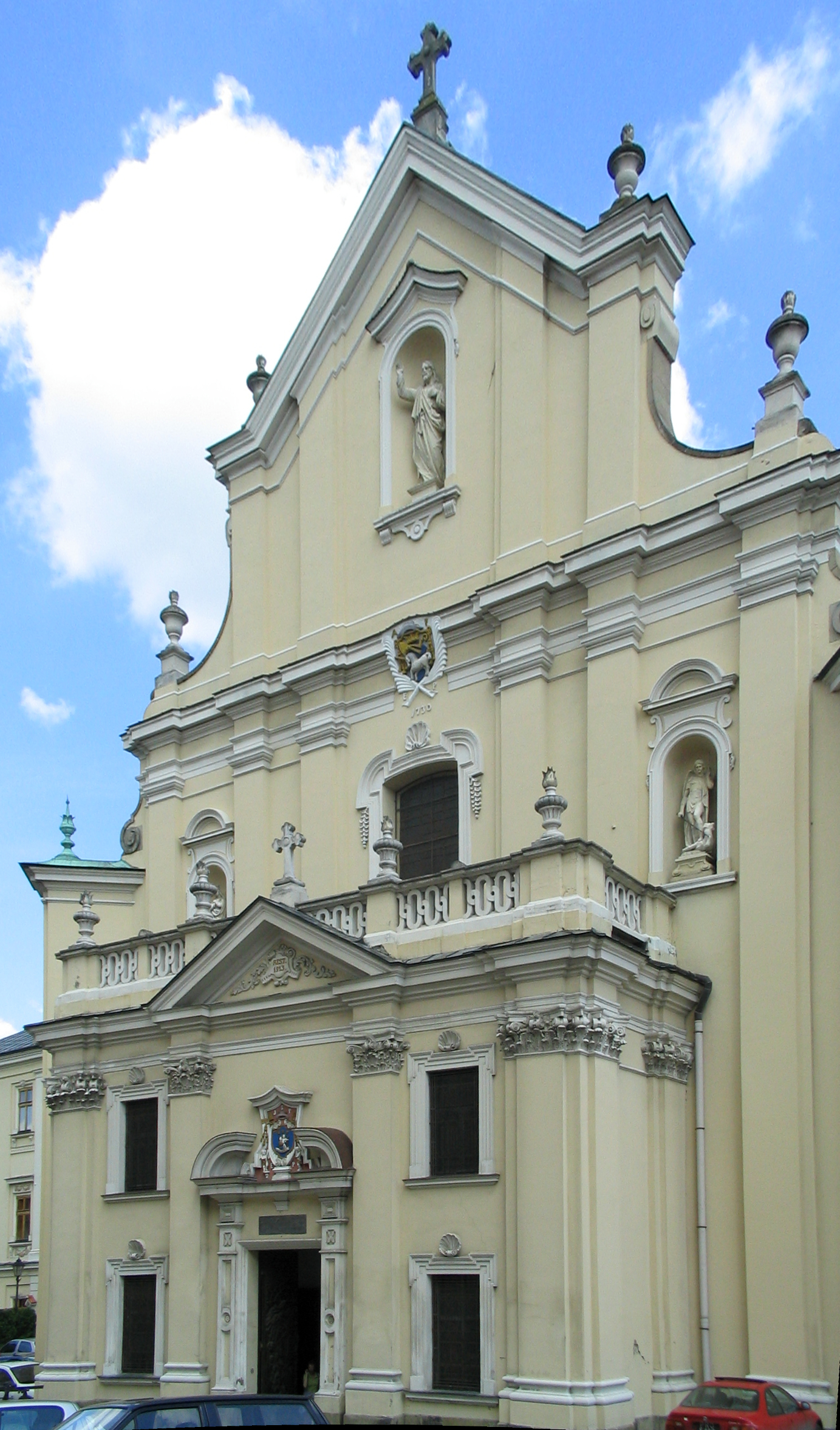
Facade

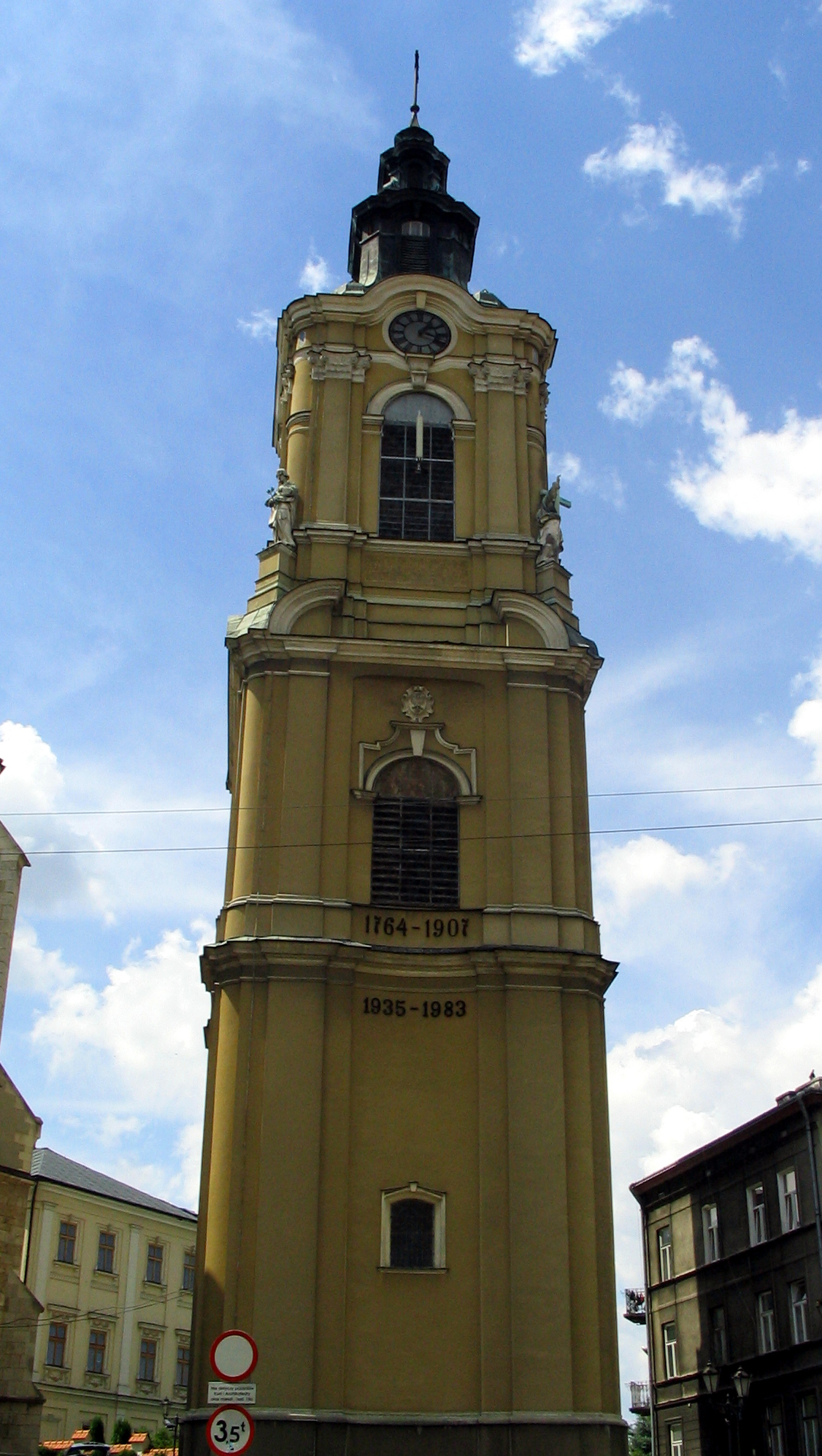
Tower
Historical views

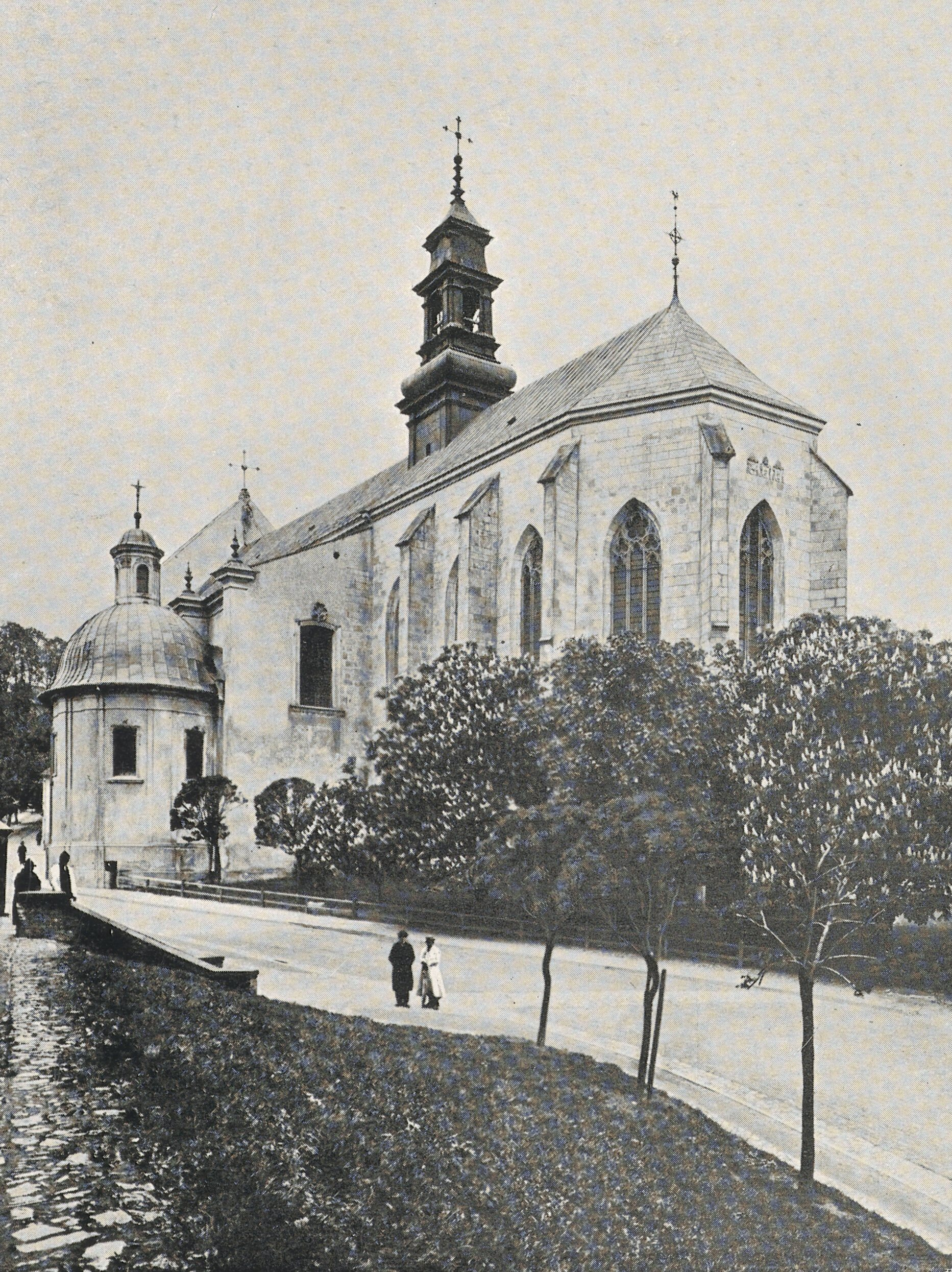
Katedra około 1906

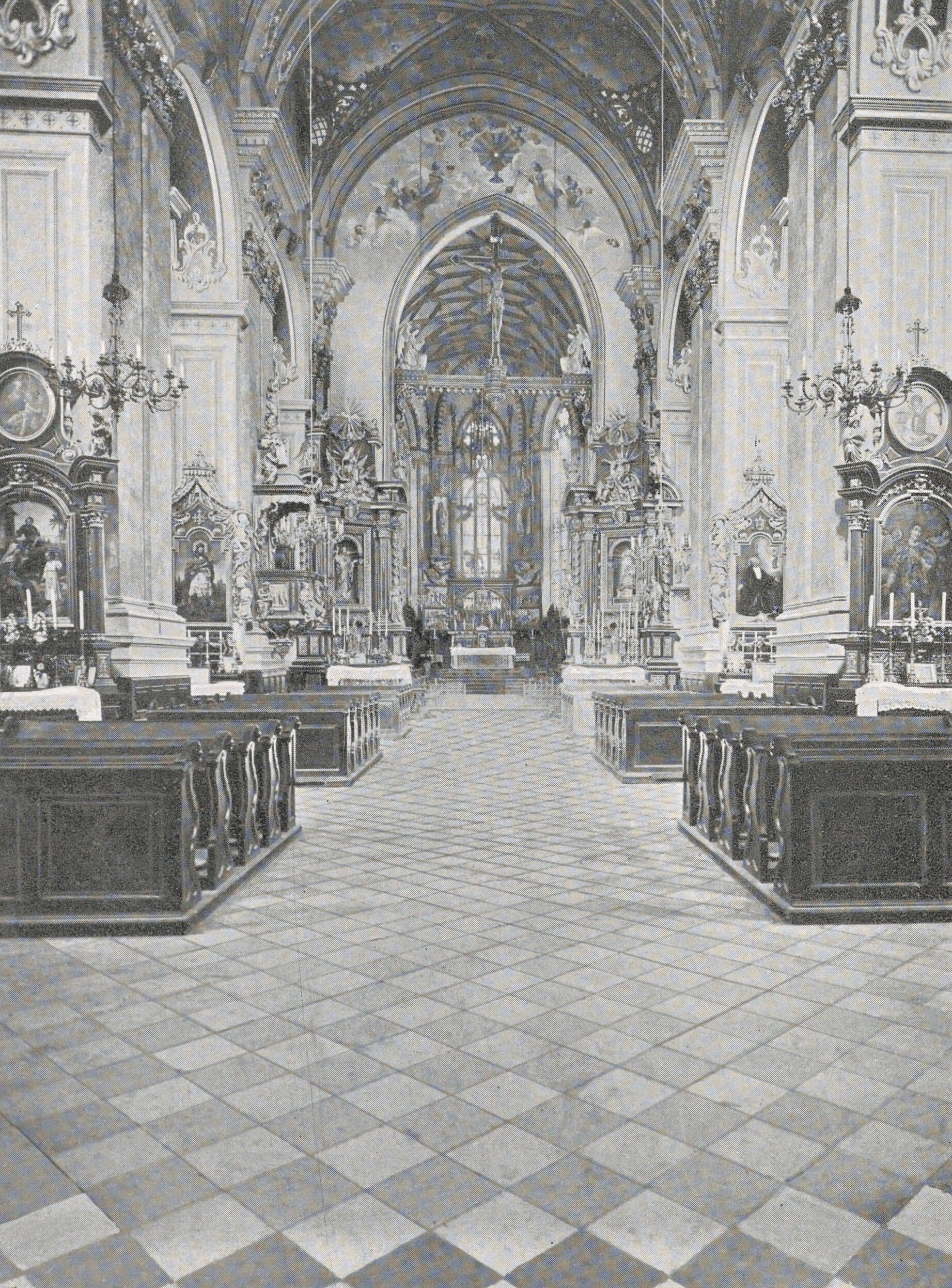
Wnętrze katedry po restauracji, około 1906

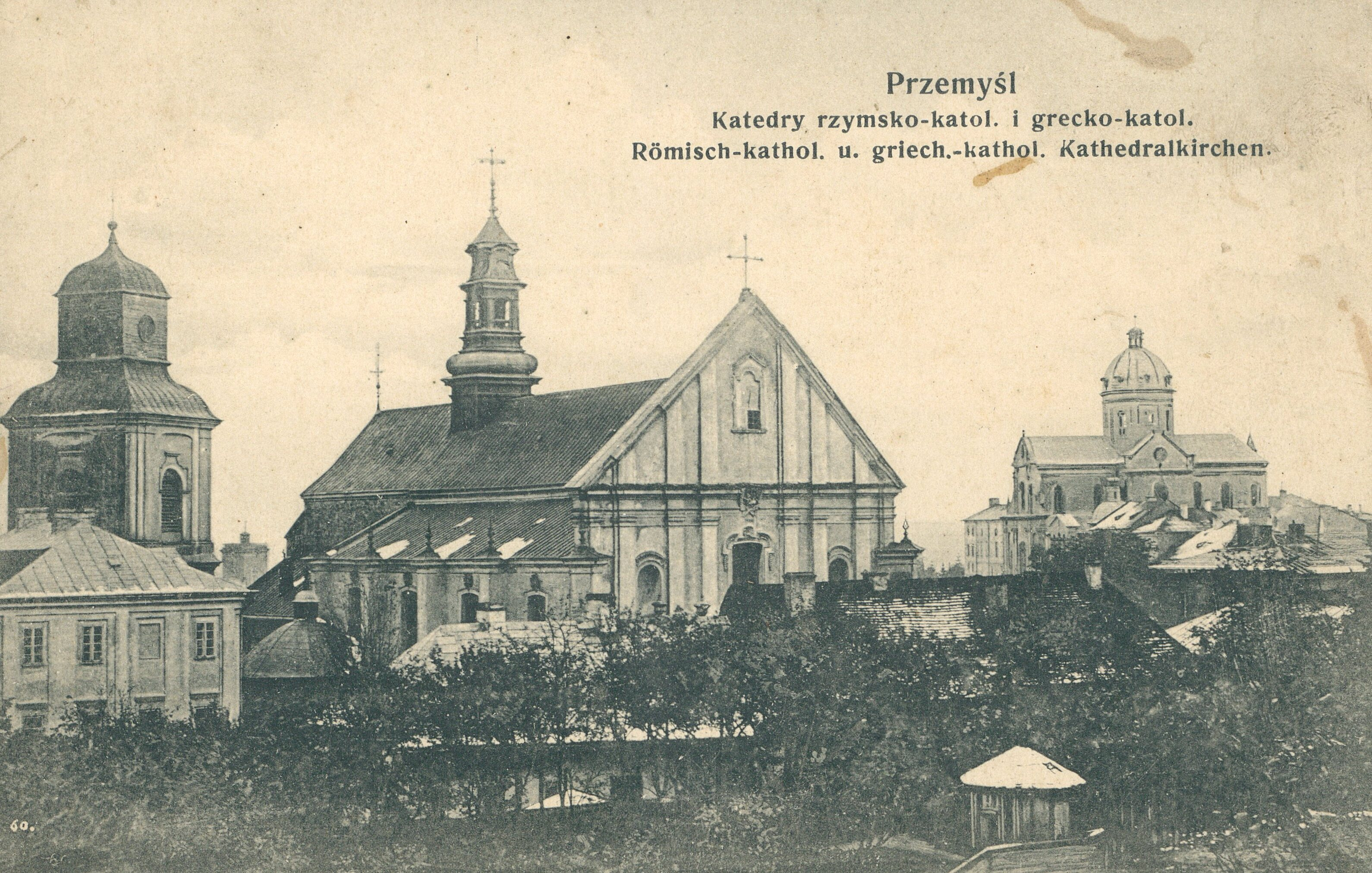
Widok ogólny, około 1908

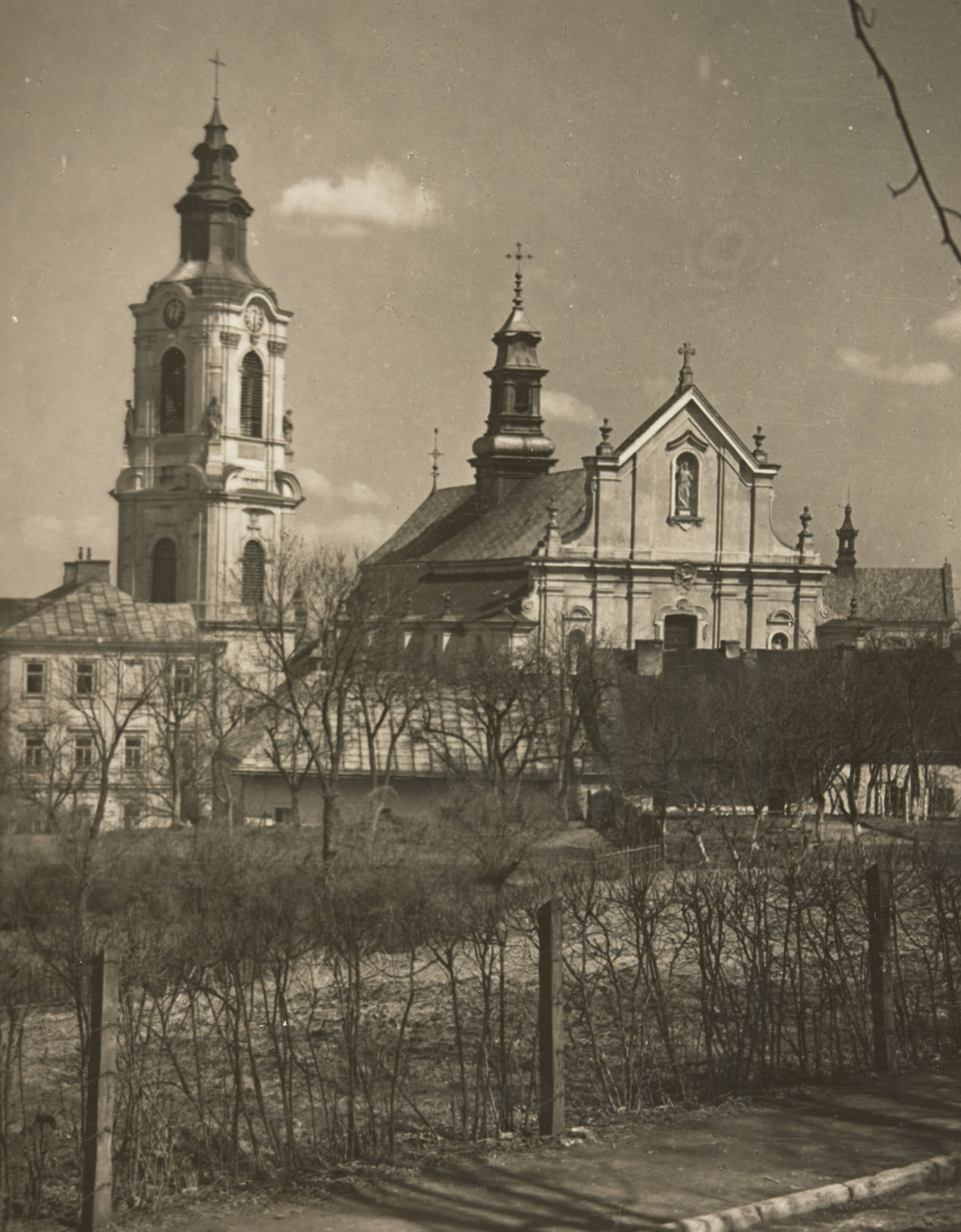
Fasada zachodnia, 1938

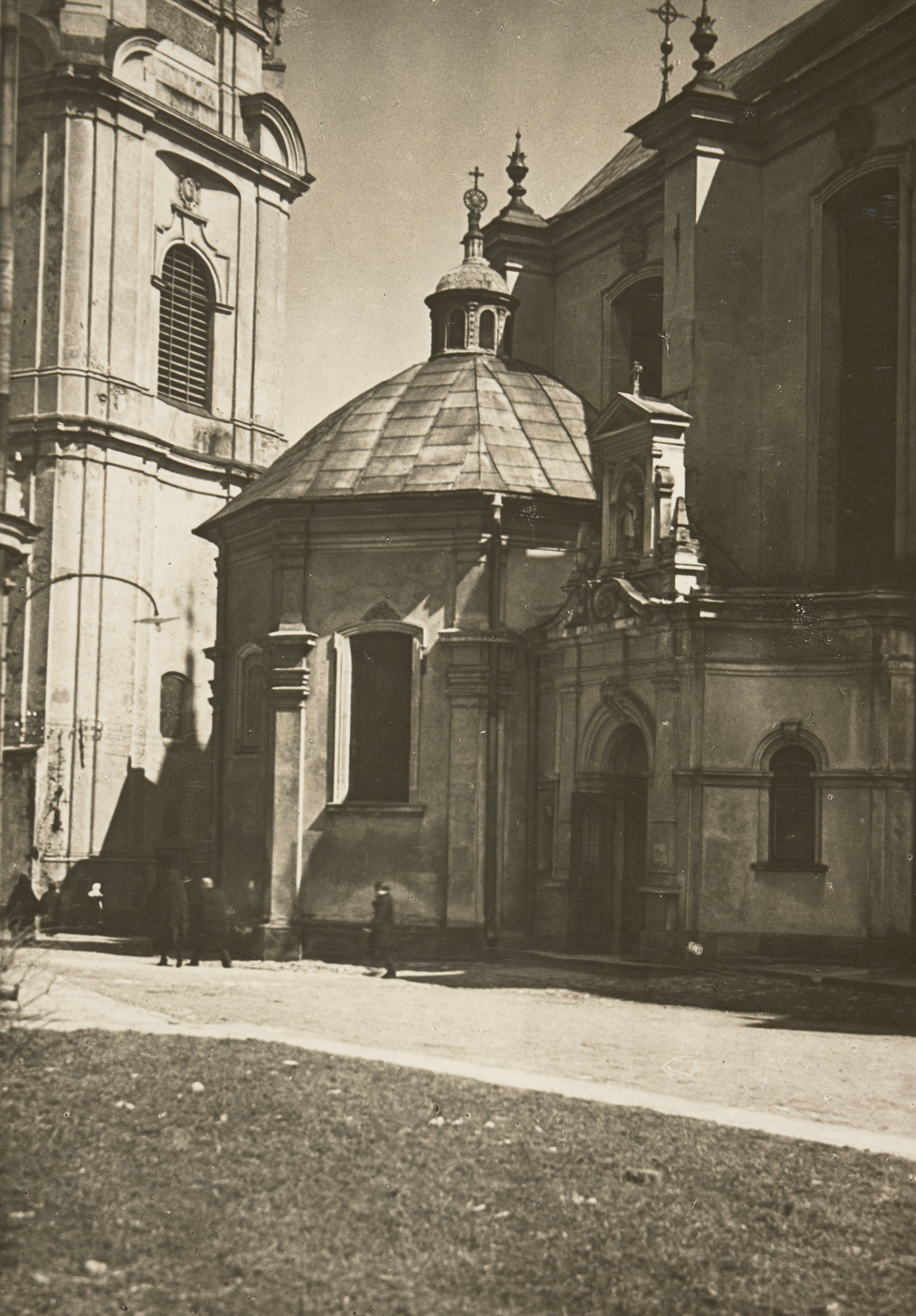
Kaplica boczna, 1938
