= Jan Niemiec (bishop) =

Polish Roman Catholic bishop (1958–2020)

- Titular Bishop of Decoriana, Auxiliary Bishop of Roman Catholic Diocese of Kamyanets-Podilskyi
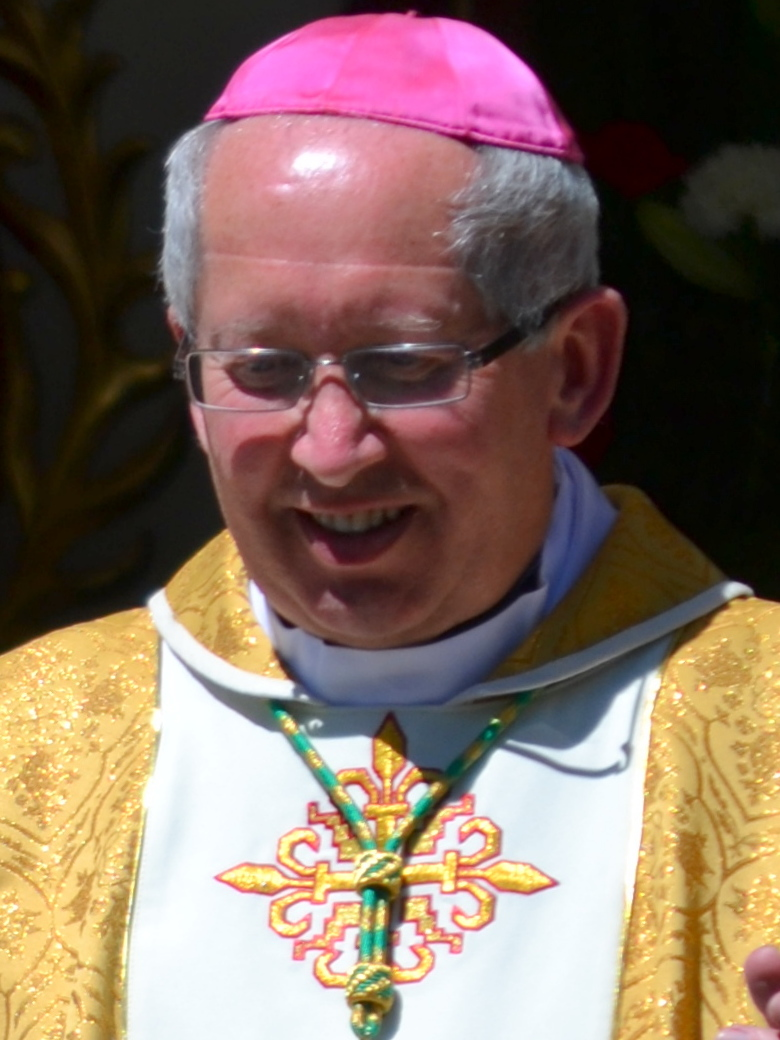
- Church: Roman Catholic Church
- Appointed: 21 October 2006
- Term ended: 27 October 2020
- Other posts: Rector of the Major Theological Seminary in Horodok (2001–2007), Vicar General of Roman Catholic Diocese of Kamyanets-Podilskyi (2007–2020)

Orders
- Ordination: 24 June 1987 (Priest) by Ignacy Tokarczuk
- Consecration: 8 December 2006 (Bishop) by Cardinal Marian Jaworski

Personal details
- Born: Jan Niemiec; 14 March 1958 Kozłówek, Polish People's Republic
- Died: 27 October 2020 (aged 62) Łańcut, Poland
- Education: Catholic University of Lublin
- Motto: Ecce Agnus Dei (Behold the Lamb of God)

Bishop Jan Niemiec (Ukrainian: Ян Нємєц; Polish: Jan Niemiec; 14 March 1958 – 27 October 2020) was a Polish-born Ukrainian Roman Catholic prelate, who served as an Auxiliary bishop of the Roman Catholic Diocese of Kamyanets-Podilskyi and the Titular Bishop of Decoriana since 21 October 2006 until his death on 27 October 2020.

== Life ==
Coat of arms of Bishop Jan Niemiec

Bishop Niemiec was born in the Roman-Catholic family of Jan and Maria (née Oparowska) Niemiec in the Eastern Poland. After graduation of the school and lyceum education, he subsequently joined the High Pedagogical School in Rzeszów (1977–1982) and after – the Major Theological Seminary in Przemyśl (1982–1987). He was ordained as priest on 24 June 1987, after he completed his philosophical and theological study.

After his ordination he served as an assistant parish priest in Poland from 1987 until 1992, when he has been transferred to Ukraine. Also during his parish work he continued to study in the Catholic University of Lublin. Since 1992, Fr. Niemiec is working in the Roman Catholic Diocese of Kamyanets-Podilskyi as the professor, prefect (1992–2001) and rector (2001–2007) of the Major Theological Seminary in Horodok. Also he graduated the Institute for the History of Science, an institution of the Polish Academy of Sciences, with Doctor of Science degree in 1998.

On 21 October 2006, he was appointed by the Pope Benedict XVI as the Auxiliary Bishop of the Roman Catholic Diocese of Kamyanets-Podilskyi and Titular Bishop of Decoriana. On 8 December 2006, he was consecrated as bishop by Cardinal Marian Jaworski and other prelates of the Roman Catholic Church in the Cathedral of Sts. Peter and Paul in Kamianets-Podilskyi.

On 12 April 2007, Bishop Niemiec was appointed as a Vicar General of the same diocese.

Bishop Niemiec died from COVID-19 during the COVID-19 pandemic in Poland on 27 October 2020, at the age of 62, at a hospital in Łańcut, Poland, where he was transferred from a hospital in Kamyanets-Podilskyi, Ukraine, five days earlier.

Catholic Church titles
Preceded by Max Mariu	Titular Bishop of Decoriana; 2006–2020	Succeeded by Vacant
