= Jan Olszanski =

Servant of God Jan Olszanski M.I.C.
- Diocesan Bishop of Roman Catholic Diocese of Kamyanets-Podilskyi
- Church: Roman Catholic Church
- Appointed: 16 January 1991
- Term ended: 4 May 2002
- Predecessor: Petro Mankowski
- Successor: Leon Dubrawski

Orders
- Ordination: 15 November 1942 (Priest) by Bolesław Twardowski
- Consecration: 2 March 1991 (Bishop) by Marian Jaworski

Personal details
- Born: Jan Olszański; 14 January 1919 Hutyska Brodski, West Ukrainian People's Republic (present day Lviv Oblast, Ukraine)
- Died: 23 February 2003 (aged 84) Kamianets-Podilskyi, Khmelnytskyi Oblast, Ukraine

Jan Olszanski, M.I.C. (Ukrainian: Ян Ольшанський; Polish: Jan Olszański; 14 January 1919 – 23 February 2003) was a Ukrainian Roman Catholic prelate as the first diocesan Bishop of the reestablished Roman Catholic Diocese of Kamyanets-Podilskyi from 16 January 1991 until his retirement on 4 May 2002. His cause for canonization has been initiated.

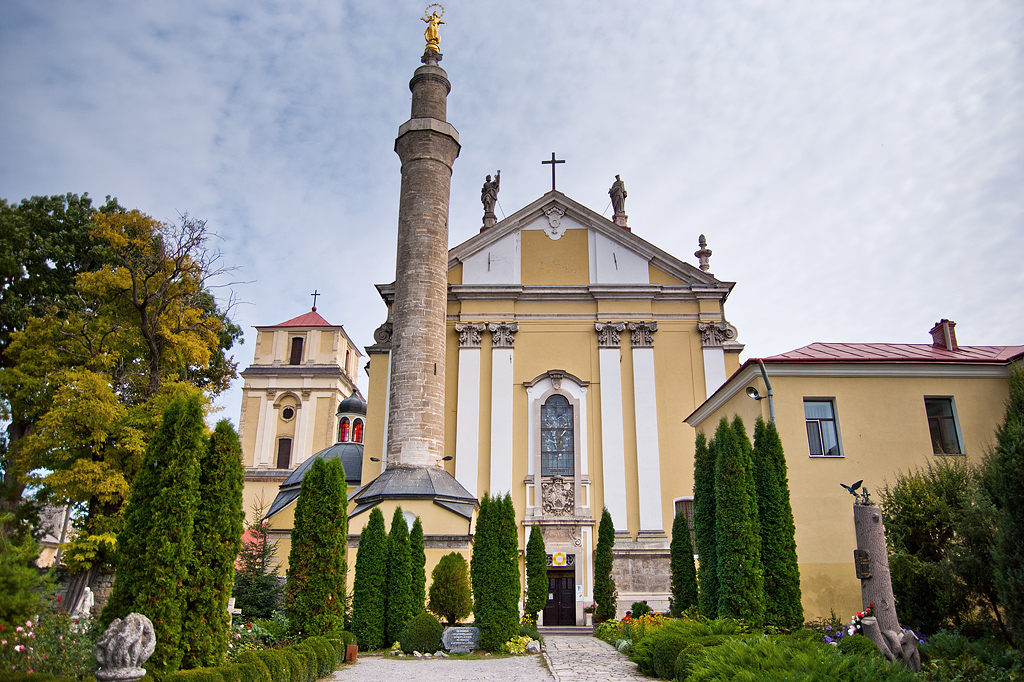
Sts. Peter and Paul Cathedral, where Bishop Jan Olszanski is buried in the crypt

== Life ==
Olszanski was born in the peasant Roman Catholic family of Jan and Maria (née Boyko) Olszański in non existed today village Hutyska Brodski (present day a territory of Zolochiv Raion, Lviv Oblast, Ukraine).

After graduation of the primary school in his native village and a state gymnasium in Brody, Olszanski subsequently joined the faculty of theology of the University of Lviv and the Major Roman Catholic Theological Seminary in Lviv in 1938 and was ordained as priest on November 15, 1942, for the Roman Catholic Archdiocese of Lviv by Archbishop Bolesław Twardowski, upon completion of his philosophical and theological studies.

During 1942–1944 he served as an assistant priest in his native archdiocese. In 1944 he was transferred to Roman Catholic Diocese of Kamyanets-Podilskyi, where he continued to serve as a parish priest and during a period of the Polish population transfers (1944–1946) he remained in the Soviet Union. Under the pressure of the Communist government he moved to Lviv in 1946, but two years later was again forced to leave Lviv and returned in the Diocese of Kamyanets-Podilskyi. Here he worked until 1991 under the Communist persecution of the religion. In the same time, he clandestinely joined the Congregation of Marian Fathers of the Immaculate Conception, were made a profession in 1988.

On January 16, 1991, he was appointed by Pope John Paul II as the first diocesan bishop of the reestablished Roman Catholic Diocese of Kamyanets-Podilskyi. On March 2, 1991, he was consecrated as bishop by Metropolitan Archbishop Marian Jaworski and other prelates of the Roman Catholic Church in the Cathedral Basilica of the Assumption, Lviv.

Olszanski retired from office, because of reaching of the age limit. He died in Kamianets-Podilskyi on February 22, 2003, in age 84.

Catholic Church titles
Preceded by Petro Mankowski	Diocesan Bishop of Roman Catholic Diocese of Kamyanets-Podilskyi; 1991–2002	Succeeded by Leon Dubrawski
