= Zmitrowicz =

Zmitrowicz is a surname. Notable people with the surname include:

- Radoslaw Zmitrowicz (born 1962), Polish-born Ukrainian Roman Catholic prelate
- Ria Zmitrowicz, British actress
