= Clavelle =

Clavelle is a surname. Notable people with the surname include:

- Peter Clavelle (born 1949), American politician
- Shannon Clavelle (born 1973), American football player

== See also ==
- Clavell
