= Decoriana =

Decoriana (Decoriensis or Dicensis) was an ancient Roman–Berber city and former bishopric in Tunisia. It is now a Latin Catholic titular see.

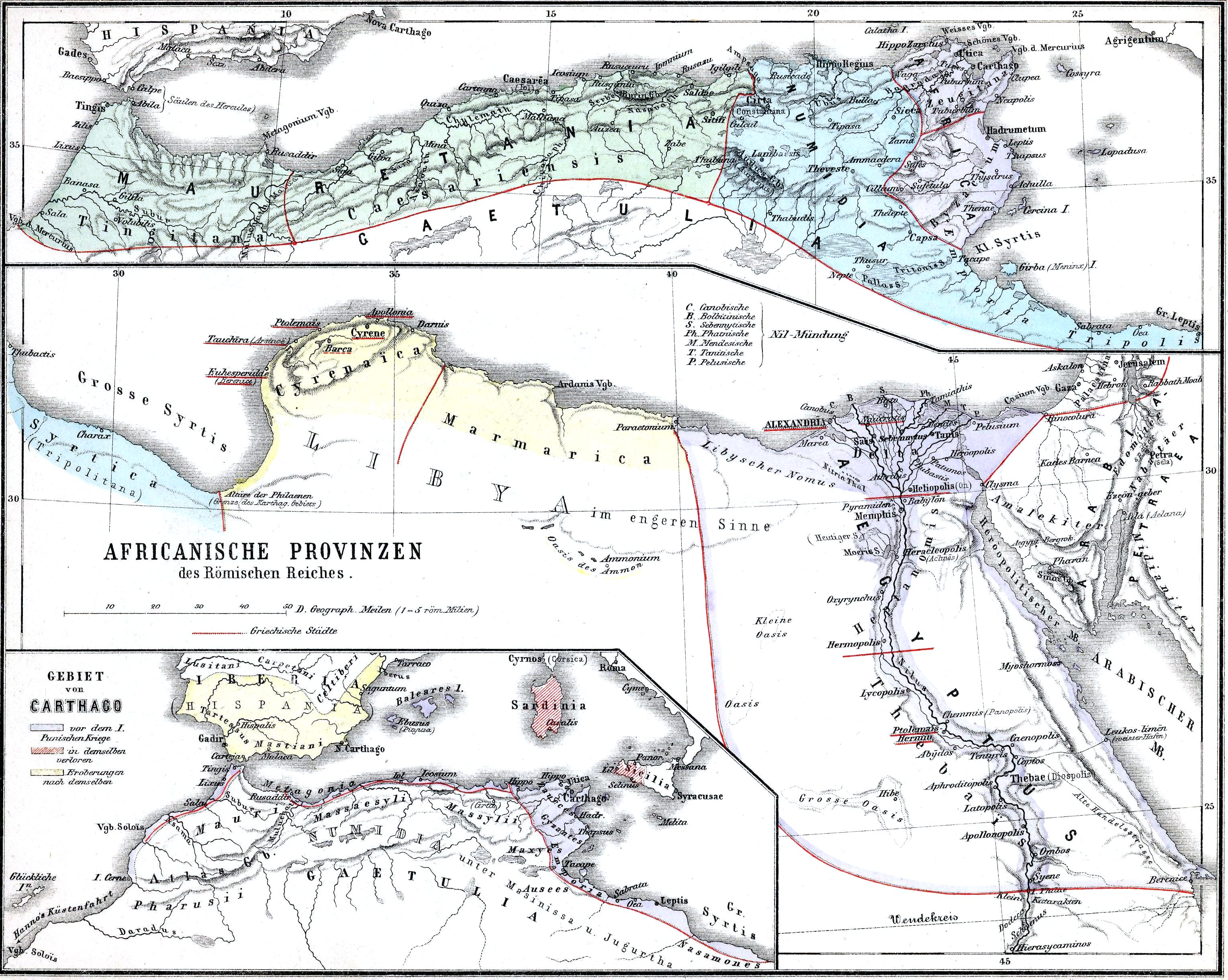
Roman Africa

== History ==
Decoriana, in today's Tunisia, was important enough in the Roman province of Byzacena to become one of the many suffragans of its capital Hadrumetum's Metropolitan Archbishop, yet it was to fade.

=== Residential bishops ===
There are only two known ancient bishops of this diocese.

- Among the Catholic bishops summoned to Carthage in 484 by the Vandal King, Huneric was the Bishop Leander (or Lenzio), who was exiled to Corsica.
- Paschasios (Pascasio), as bishop of Decorianensis in Byzacena, signed the acts of the African council antimonothelite in 646 and subscribed in 645/646 the letter sent from the bishops of Byzacena to the Byzantine emperor Constans II, asking him to persuade the Patriarch of Constantinople, Paul II, to abandon the monothelite heresy; the letter was read out at the Lateran Council in October 649; in the list of signatures his name appears twenty-first: Conc. Lat., p. 77, line 37

=== Titular see ===
The diocese was nominally restored in 1933, as a Latin Catholic titular bishopric Decoriana.

It has had the following incumbents, all of the lowest (episcopal) rank:

- Felipe Benito Pacheco Condurú, as emeritate (17 Jan 1959 Appointed - 1 Oct 1972 Died); previously Bishop of Ilhéus (Brazil) (1941.04.19 – 1946.02.07), Bishop of Parnaíba (Brazil) (1946.02.07 – 1959.01.17)
- Julius Gábriš (19 Feb 1973 Appointed - 13 Nov 1987 Died), as Apostolic Administrator of the then Apostolic Administration of Trnava (Slovakia) (1973.02.19 – 1977.12.30); later Apostolic Administrator of the Metropolitan Roman Catholic Archdiocese of Trnava (Slovakia) (1977.12.30 – 1987.11.13)
- Max Mariu, S.M. (30 Jan 1988 Appointed - 12 Dec 2005 Died), as Auxiliary Bishop of Hamilton (New Zealand) (1988.01.30 – 2005.12.12)
- Jan Niemiec (21 Oct 2006 – 27 Oct 2020 Died), as Auxiliary Bishop of Kamyanets-Podilskyi (Ukraine)
- Guillermo Antonio Cornejo Monzón (10 Feb 2021 – present), as Auxiliary Bishop of Lima.

== See also ==
- Catholic Church in Tunisia
