= Honaine =

Honaïne هنين Gypsaria
- Commune and town
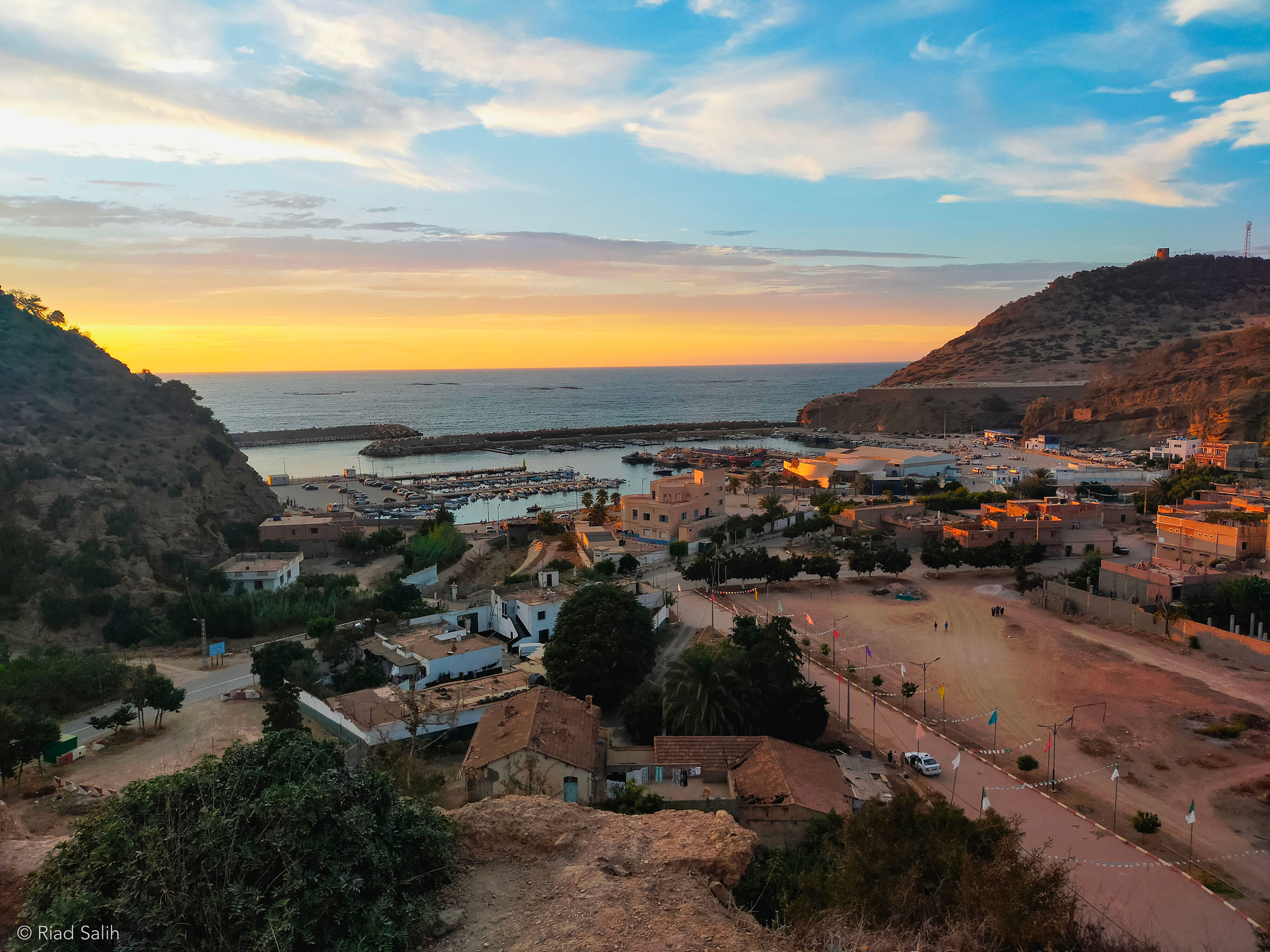
- Ville de Honaine
- Nicknames: Gissaria and Artisiga
- Location within Algeria
- Coordinates: 35°10′35″N 1°39′18″W
- Country: Algeria
- Province: Tlemcen Province

Population (1998)
  - Total: 5,408
- Time zone: UTC+1 (CET)

Honaïne is a town and commune in Tlemcen Province in northwestern Algeria.

== Geography ==
The territory of the commune of Honaïne is situated to the north of the wilaya of Tlemcen. Honaïne is a port city on the south-western shore of the Mediterranean Sea. It is located north of the Trara Mountains.

Located at the extreme north-west of Algeria, 60 km (37 mi) north-west of Tlemcen and West of Sidi Bel Abbès. There are beautiful beaches located near Honaïne.

In 1984, the commune of Honaïne is constituted from the following localities:

- Honaïne
- Tafsout
- Ouled Youcef
- Tadjera
- Ouled Amar
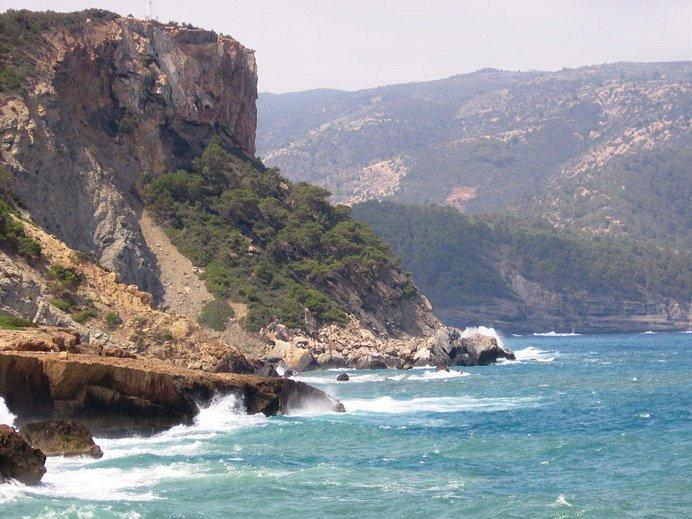
La ville de Honaïne

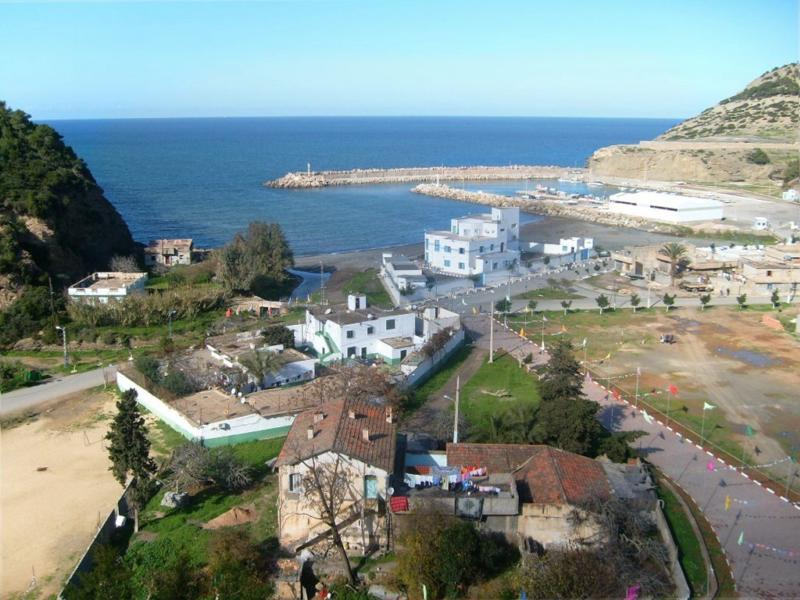
La ville de Honaïne

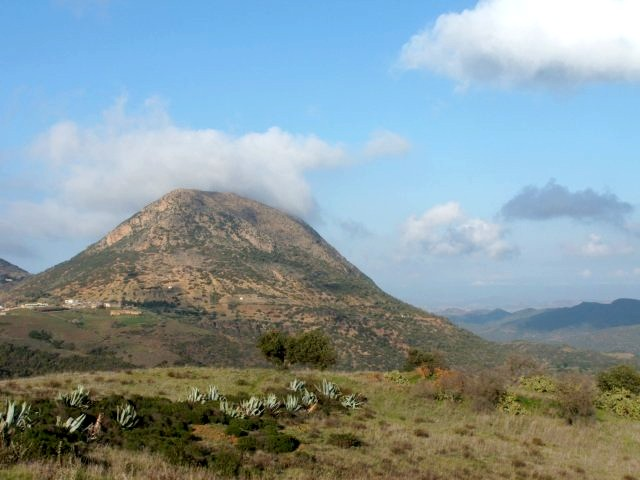
Tadjeras.

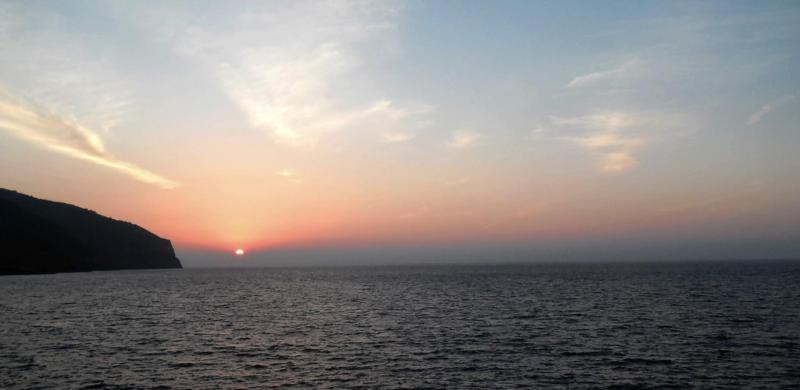
Coast at Honaïne

== History ==
=== Ancient ===
During the Roman Empire Honaïne was called by the Romans "Gypsaria" Gissaria and "Artisiga". It was a Roman town of the Roman province of Mauretania Caesariensis.

In late antiquity the town was embroiled in the Donatist controversy, and we know that at the Conference of Carthage of 411, the town was represented by both the Catholic Germano and Donatist Bishop Fidentino. A representative of the town is not known to have attended the 484 AD Synod of Huneric, also in Carthage. Today the diocese of Gissaria survives as a titular bishopric of the Roman Catholic Church and the current bishop is Radoslaw Zmitrowicz, an auxiliary bishop of Kamyanets-Podilskyi.

== Middle Ages ==
This town has Berber vestiges dating from the Almohad period, from the time of the flourishing growth of the city which was an important center of trade flows between the two shores of the Mediterranean. The ramparts of the city still bear witness to the past splendor and power of this region. The Spaniards called her Hone.

The founder of the Almohad dynasty, Ibn Ali El Koumi, later established in Marrakesh, was born in Tajra, a hill overlooking Honaïne, two kilometers to the west. In 1162, Oran and Honaïne joined forces to build the hundred ships commanded by Abd El Moumen Ben Ali.

It sheltered the port of the Ifrenides, which later became the most important port of the Almohads in North Africa, which was later to be one of the two ports of the Tlemcen Zianides. The port was partially destroyed in 1534, after a brief Spanish occupation. Honaïne saw the arrival of a large number of Moorish refugees.

Abd El Moumen Ben Ali, founder of the empire of the Almohads was born near Honaïne.

At the end of the reign of Ali Ben Yoûsof in 1192, the Masmoûda already had formidable forces. Heading eastwards, the Almohad (الموحدون in Arabic) troops commanded by Abd El Moumen Ben Ali arrived at the mountains of Tlemcen. In Spain, as in the Maghreb, the Almoravids were unable to resist the Almohads. Only the "veiled men" who held the Balearics escaped: the Beni Ghanya, who will play a not insignificant role in the history of Algeria.

Ibn Toûmert, known as El-Mahdi, was the precursor of the Almohad movement. A disciple of the theologian Ghazali, this reformer wanted to apply the precepts of his master in the West. Everywhere he censures abuses and captivates listeners by his eloquence. It bears controversy in the field of theology, whereas the Almoravids made jurisprudence, their weapon of combat. His followers; The "Al-Muwahhidun" (Unitarians) professed the dogma of the unity of God in all its purity. Ibn Toûmert will meet Abd El Moumen near Bougie (present Bejaïa), during his trip to the Orient (1117). The Master of the Under recognized in him the predestined man: "The mission on which the life of religion will rest will triumph only by Abd El Moumen, the torch of the Almohads.

Abd El Moumen led three campaigns that led to the unification of North Africa [ref. necessary]. From this period dates the first cadastre of North Africa in 1159, Abd El Moumen ordered the surveying of Ifriqiyya and the Maghreb. Measurements were made from the Cyrenaica to the Wadi N'un, from one to the other. From this surface one third was cut off for mountains, rivers, salt lakes, roads and deserts. The remaining two-thirds were stricken with the Kharadj or land tax. This was a great innovation. The sovereign Almohads of the Maghreb enjoyed great prestige both in the East and in the West. However, the Almohad Empire, plagued by internal struggles for power and the difficulty of governing such a vast empire, began its decline. It was first Spain, which escaped the Almohad caliphate, followed by the Hafsides in 1229 (present-day Tunisia), Tlemcen with the Zianides in 1235 (current Algeria), and the Merinids in 1269 (present Morocco) who took Marrakesh. This was the end of the Almohad dynasty. Thus the Almohad dynasty reigned over North Africa and half of Spain from 1147 to 1269.

== Economy ==
The town is a Mediterranean port whose main activity is artisanal fishing. It is also a seaside resort with several beaches: the beaches of Honaïne-center, Tafsout, Agla and Bni kheled.

== Heritage ==
The site of Honaïne, including the intramural area, the ramparts, the Casbah, the site of the ancient port, the watchtower, has been classified as a historic site since 1982.

== See also ==
- European enclaves in North Africa before 1830
