= Cilibia =

Cilibia may refer to the following places and jurisdictions :

- Cilibia, Africa, a former Ancient city and bishopric in Africa Proconcularis, now a Latin Catholic titular see
- Cilibia, Buzău, a rural commune (municipality) in Buzău County, Muntenia (Greater Walachia, southern Romania)
