= Yago de la Cierva =

- Born: Yago de la Cierva Álvarez de Sotomayor; 10 November 1960 (age 65); Madrid, Spain
- Education: University of Santiago de Compostela; University of Navarra; Pontifical University of the Holy Cross
- Occupations: Journalist, university lecturer, communications consultant
- Employer(s): IESE Business School; Pontifical University of the Holy Cross
- Known for: Executive director of World Youth Day 2011; Founder of Rome Reports

Yago de la Cierva Álvarez de Sotomayor (born 10 November 1960) is a Spanish journalist, university lecturer and communications consultant specialising in institutional communication and crisis communication. After beginning his career at the Holy See Press Office, he founded and directed the television news agency Rome Reports and served as executive director of World Youth Day 2011, held in Madrid. His teaching has been based mainly at the Pontifical University of the Holy Cross and IESE Business School. In 2026 he coordinated Pope Leo XIV's apostolic journey to Spain.

== Biography ==
=== Education ===
De la Cierva was born in Madrid in 1960 to a family of Galician origin. He graduated in law from the University of Santiago de Compostela in 1982, obtained a master's degree in institutional communication from the Pontifical University of the Holy Cross in Rome in 1998, and earned a doctorate in philosophy from the University of Navarra in 2000. In 2009 he completed the Program for Management Development (PMD) at IESE Business School.

=== Vatican years and the founding of Rome Reports ===
In the early 1990s de la Cierva joined the communications staff of the Holy See as the first editor-in-chief of the Vatican Information Service, the daily news bulletin of the Holy See Press Office, working in the press office alongside the then spokesman Joaquín Navarro-Valls. From the late 1990s he taught at the Faculty of Institutional Social Communication of the Pontifical University of the Holy Cross. He covered Vatican affairs as a journalist and, around 2003, founded the television news agency Rome Reports in Rome, created to supply news about the pope and the Vatican to broadcasters without their own correspondent in Italy; he was its first director until 2008.

=== World Youth Day 2011 ===
In 2009 he was appointed communications officer for World Youth Day 2011, a role that grew into the executive directorship of the event, held in Madrid in August 2011 under Pope Benedict XVI. During the preparations, which lasted about three years, he coordinated the content, logistics, financing and volunteers of the gathering, which drew hundreds of thousands of young people and some 22,500 volunteers.

By around 2009 he had also joined IESE Business School, where for more than a decade he taught corporate communication and crisis management in the MBA programme and served as the school's director of corporate communication.

Between 2014 and 2016 he was a member of the Pontifical Council for the Laity, the Roman Curia dicastery responsible, among other tasks, for organising World Youth Days; in 2016 he coordinated the international communication department of World Youth Day 2016 in Kraków.

Between 2014 and 2020 he published several books on institutional and crisis communication—La Iglesia, casa de cristal (2014), Comunicar en aguas turbulentas (2015), Leading Companies Through Storms and Crises (2018) and Navegar en aguas turbulentas (2020)—and edited the collective work Megaeventos de la Iglesia católica (2018). As an academic author he has written case studies on crisis communication in church and university institutions.

During these years he taught as a visiting lecturer outside Spain and continued teaching at the University of Navarra and King Juan Carlos University. In 2023 he led communication-training sessions for diocesan communications officers in Seville, and combined this work with consultancy at the firm PROA Comunicación, where he headed the crisis-communication division, and with the presidency of the Villanueva Foundation, which owns Villanueva University in Madrid.

In May 2025, during the conclave that elected Pope Leo XIV, he took part as a Vatican commentator in several media. A year later, in May 2026, he moderated a dialogue at the Rafael del Pino Foundation with Maximino Caballero, prefect of the Secretariat for the Economy of the Holy See.

=== Pope Leo XIV's 2026 visit to Spain ===
In early 2026 the Archbishop of Madrid, Cardinal José Cobo, entrusted him with the general coordination of Pope Leo XIV's apostolic journey to Spain, in view of his experience at World Youth Day 2011. He chaired the National Organising Committee set up by the Spanish Episcopal Conference, with areas for liturgy, communication, finance, logistics and protocol. The trip had a threefold origin: the Canary Islands, as a visit inherited from Pope Francis and focused on immigration; Barcelona, marking the centenary of the death of Antoni Gaudí and the completion of the Sagrada Família; and Madrid, at the pope's express request. Preparations took about four months, compared with more than two years for World Youth Day, and mobilised some 18,000 volunteers in Madrid alone. The journey took place between 6 and 12 June 2026, with stops in Madrid, Barcelona, Gran Canaria and Tenerife, and included the first visit by a pope to the Canary Islands. During the visit he acted as the organisation's spokesman to the media. After the trip he gave his assessment in several media outlets and suggested the possibility of a future papal visit to Santiago de Compostela.

== Selected works ==
- La Iglesia, casa de cristal. Propuestas y experiencias de comunicación durante crisis y controversias mediáticas. Madrid: BAC, 2014. ISBN 978-84-220-1735-6.
- Comunicar en aguas turbulentas. Un enfoque ético para la comunicación de crisis. Pamplona: EUNSA, 2015. ISBN 978-84-313-3032-3.
- Leading Companies Through Storms and Crises. Principles and Best Practices in Conflict Prevention, Crisis Management and Communication. London: Pearson Education, 2018.
- Navegar en aguas turbulentas. Principios y buenas prácticas en gestión y comunicación de crisis. Pamplona: EUNSA, 2020. ISBN 978-84-313-3661-5.
- (ed.) Megaeventos de la Iglesia católica. Variopinto Comunicación, 2018.
