= Clavell =

Clavell is a surname. Notable people with the surname include:

- George Clavell (1725–1774), English politician
- Gian Clavell (born 1993), Puerto Rican basketball player
- Gilberto Clavell (born 1989), Puerto Rican basketball player
- James Clavell (1921–1994), British/American novelist
- John Clavell (c. 1601–1643), 17th century English adventurer
- John Clavell (MP) (1541–1609), 16th century English politician
- Lluis Clavell Ortiz-Repiso (born 1941), Spanish Roman Catholic priest
- Óscar Clavell (born 1978), Spanish politician
- Robert Clavell (c. 1633 – c. 1711), a bookseller of London
- Rodney Clavell, former South Australian corrections officer and prisoner at Yatala Labour Prison
- Walter Clavell (1639–1677), English administrator employed by the East India Company as Chief of the factories in the Bay of Bengal

== See also ==
- Clavell Tower, in Dorset, England
- Cavell (surname)
