= Eduard Kava =

Ukrainian Roman Catholic prelate

Most Reverend Eduard Kava, O.F.M. Conv.
- Diocesan Bishop of Kamianets-Podilskyi
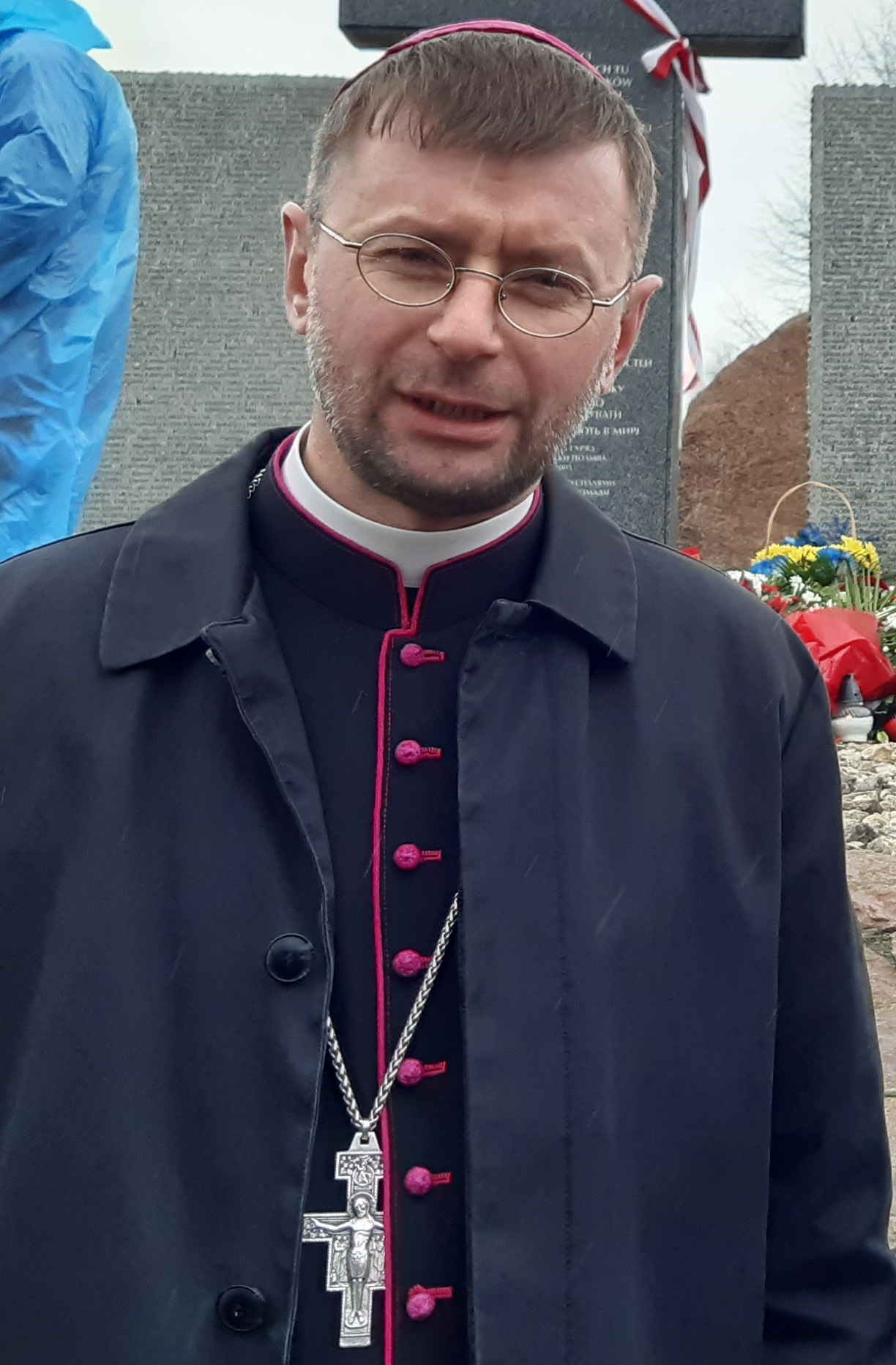
- Church: Roman Catholic Church
- Appointed: 1 July 2025
- Predecessor: Leon Dubrawski
- Previous posts: Delegate of the Order of Friars Minor Conventual for Ukraine (2008–2017), Titular Bishop of Cilibia and Auxiliary Bishop of Lviv (2017–2025)

Orders
- Ordination: 1 June 2003 by Tadeusz Kondrusiewicz
- Consecration: 21 June 2017 by Mieczysław Mokrzycki

Personal details
- Born: Eduard Stanislavovych Kava; 17 April 1978 (age 48) Mostyska, Lviv Oblast, Ukrainian SSR
- Coat of arms

Bishop Eduard Kava, O.F.M. Conv. (Ukrainian: Едвард Кава; born 17 April 1978) is a Ukrainian Roman Catholic prelate, who is serving as the Diocesan Bishop of Kamianets-Podilskyi since 1 July 2025. Previously he was a Titular Bishop of Cilibia and Auxiliary bishop of Archdiocese of Lviv since 13 May 2017 until 1 July 2025.

== Life ==
Bishop Kava was born in the ethnic Polish family of Stanislav and Kazymyra (née Dorosh) Kava in the Western Ukraine. After graduation of the school education, joined the Order of Friars Minor Conventual in 1995; he made a profession on 28 September 1997 and a solemn profession on 15 December 2001, and was ordained as priest on 1 June 2003, after graduation of the Major Franciscan Theological Seminary in Kraków, Poland and Major Theological Seminary Mary – the Queen of Apostles in Saint Petersburg, Russian Federation.

He returned to Ukraine in 2003 and began to work in the Franciscan parishes and as superior of the different local Franciscan communities. During 2016–2017 he served as a Guardian of the convent of the parish of St. Antony in Lviv.

On 13 May 2017, he was appointed by the Pope Francis as the second Auxiliary Bishop of the Archdiocese of Lviv, Ukraine and Titular Bishop of Cilibia. On 21 June 2017, he was consecrated as bishop by Metropolitan Archbishop Mieczysław Mokrzycki and other prelates of the Roman Catholic Church.

On 1 July 2025 he was appointed as the Diocesan Bishop of Kamianets-Podilskyi.

== Russian invasion of Ukraine ==
Bishop Kava spoke out on multiple occasions about the Russian invasion of Ukraine. In the immediate aftermath of the invasion, in February 2022, he was critical of his brother bishops in Germany, Belarus and Russia, for not speaking openly about the situation, saying: "Why are you silent while we are being killed? Where is your voice of solidarity with the innocent victims of Putin's Russia? Where are your actions that show love; deeds without which our Christian faith is dead; where is your active position? Some of the leaders of your countries support aggression, others are its source, and you are silent? Is this your version of Christianity? Do you still remember that keeping silent about sin is also a sin?"

In August 2022 he said: "We are losing sons and daughters of our people, we are losing territories, but Ukraine is still an independent state! And today, more than ever before, we value and honor this independence of ours. And we know that every drop of blood and sweat, every life, all our prayers, tears of wives and mothers, all the pain and fear that have accompanied us for 6 months - everything is not in vain. Today we prove to ourselves that we are worthy and worthy of this gift of God, which is independence, and we are ready to fight for this gift."

In September he referred to a Russian drone strike on a Caritas Spes warehouse in Lviv as "an attack on the poorest and most needy".

Catholic Church titles
| Preceded by Javier Echevarría Rodríguez | Titular Bishop of Cilibia; 2017–2025 | Succeeded by Evandro Campos Maria |
| Preceded by Leon Dubrawski | Diocesan Bishop of Kamianets-Podilskyi; 2025–present | Incumbent |
