= Radosław Zmitrowicz =

Radosław Zmitrowicz, O.M.I.
- Titular Bishop of Gypsaria, Auxiliary Bishop of Roman Catholic Diocese of Kamyanets-Podilskyi
- Church: Roman Catholic Church
- Appointed: 29 November 2012
- Successor: Incumbent
- Other post: Superior of the Delegature of Missionary Oblates in Ukraine (2006–2012)

Orders
- Ordination: 17 June 1989 (Priest) by Stanisław Napierała
- Consecration: 9 February 2013 (Bishop) by Leon Dubrawski

Personal details
- Born: Radosław Zmitrowicz; 2 September 1962 (age 63) Wrzeszcz, Gdańsk, Polish People's Republic
- Coat of arms

Bishop Radosław Zmitrowicz, O.M.I. (Ukrainian: Радослав Змітрович; Polish: Radosław Zmitrowicz; born 2 September 1962 in Wrzeszcz, Gdańsk, Poland) is a Polish-born Ukrainian Roman Catholic prelate, who serves as an Auxiliary bishop of the Roman Catholic Diocese of Kamyanets-Podilskyi and the Titular Bishop of Gypsaria since 21 October 2006.

== Life ==
Bishop Zmitrowicz was born in the Roman-Catholic family in the suburb of Gdańsk. After graduation from the school and lyceum education, he joined the Missionary Oblates of Mary Immaculate in 1981; he made a solemn profession on 21 May 1987, and was ordained as priest on 17 June 1989, after graduation from the Major Missionary Oblates Theological Seminary in Obra, Poland, and Theological faculty of the Adam Mickiewicz University in Poznań, Poland.

After his ordination he served in different Missionary Oblates institutions in Poland from 1989 until 1997, when he was transferred to Turkmenistan in the newly created Mission sui iuris of Turkmenistan. After 2000 he worked in Ukraine. Fr. Zmitrowicz served in the Missionary Oblates parishes in Chernihiv, Slavutych and Kyiv, until 2006, when he was appointed as a Superior of the Delegature of Missionary Oblates of Mary Immaculate in Ukraine.

On 29 November 2012 he was appointed by the Pope Benedict XVI as the Auxiliary Bishop of the Roman Catholic Diocese of Kamyanets-Podilskyi and Titular Bishop of Gypsaria. On 9 February 2013 he was consecrated as a bishop by Bishop Leon Dubrawski and other prelates of the Roman Catholic Church.

== 2022 Russian invasion of Ukraine ==
The bishop's diocese was largely unaffected by the direct impact of the 2022 Russian invasion of Ukraine, but saw a large influx of refugees, to whom the Church provided aid and humanitarian assistance.

In an interview with Aid to the Church in Need, Bishop Zmitrowicz warned about the lasting effects of the conflict. "The worst consequences of the war will not be immediate, but will drag out. The psychological, spiritual, physical and humanitarian consequences, as well as those on the family, will probably be felt later. The healing is a process. We have started psychological services in one of our houses, and a priest takes part in this process. Only God can heal these deep wounds. Only God can answer the question of why are we suffering in this way." He told the organisation that the Catholic Church had already asked for help from international specialists on PTSD to prepare programmes to help soldiers and their families in the long-run.

Catholic Church titles
Preceded by José Roberto Ospina Leongómez	Titular Bishop of Gypsaria; 2012–	Succeeded by Incumbent
