= Mariano Fazio =

Argentine Roman Catholic priest

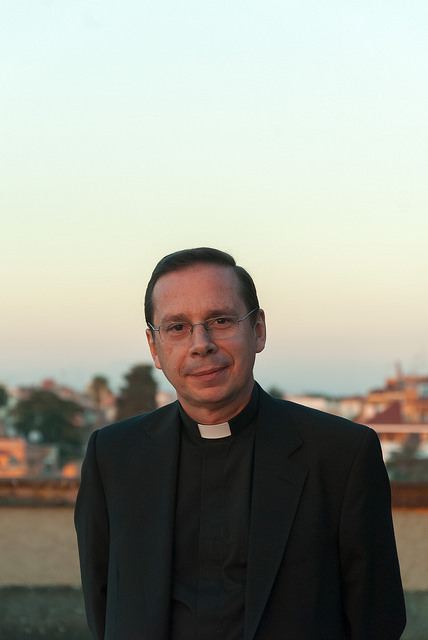
Mariano Fazio

Mariano Fazio is an Argentine Roman Catholic priest who is the Auxiliary Vicar of the Prelature of Opus Dei (2019 to the present).

He was born on April 25, 1960, in Buenos Aires, Argentina . He was the rector of the Pontifical University of the Holy Cross from 2002 to 2008, and was the president of the Conference of Rectors of the Pontifical Universities of Rome. He served as the Regional Vicar of Opus Dei in Argentina, Paraguay and Bolivia up to 2014. In 2007, he worked as an expert at the Latin American Bishops Conference in Aparecida, Brazil.

== Education and early work ==
He finished History at the University of Buenos Aires. He has a doctorate in philosophy from the Pontifical University of the Holy Cross.

For seven years he was a professor of Philosophy of Law and was an editorial writer for the Ecuadorean newspaper El Telégrafo.

In 1991, he was ordained a priest by John Paul II.

He is a member of the Chesterton Society in Argentina and the National Academy of History in Ecuador.

== Works ==
He is the author of more than 20 books on modern society and the process of secularization.

- Beato Pablo VI: Gobernar desde el dolor
- De Benedicto XV a Benedicto XVI
- El último romántico: San Josemaría en el siglo XXI
  - English Edition: Last of the Romantics: St Josemaria in the Twenty-First Century, Princeton, Scepter Publishers, 2018. ISBN 9781594173332
- Historia de la filosofía contemporánea
- Historia de la filosofía moderna
- Historia de las ideas contemporáneas
  - English Edition: History of Contemporary Ideas: The Process of Secularization from the Renaissance to the 21st Century, Downers Grove, Midwest Theological Forum, 2024. ISBN 978-1-948139-99-1
- Juan XXIII
- Pope Francis: Keys to His Thought
