= Fernando Ocáriz Braña =

Spanish priest and prelate of Opus Dei (born 1944)

The Reverend Monsignor Fernando Ocáriz Braña
- Prelate of Opus Dei
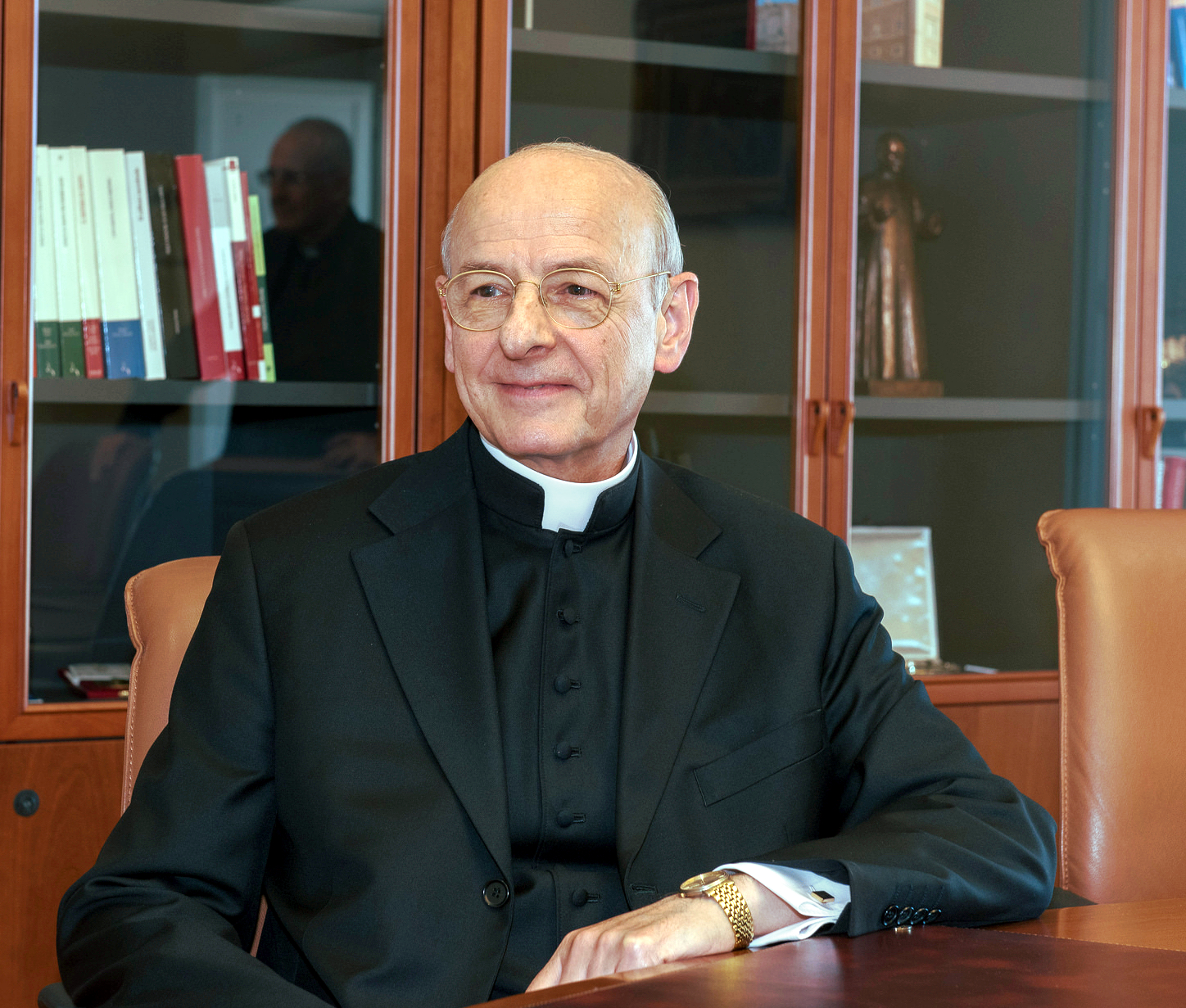
- Church: Catholic
- See: Opus Dei
- Appointed: 23 January 2017
- Installed: 27 January 2017
- Predecessor: Javier Echevarría Rodríguez
- Previous posts: Vicar General of Opus Dei (1994–2014); Auxiliary Vicar of Opus Dei (2014–2017)

Orders
- Ordination: 15 August 1971 by Marcelo González Martín

Personal details
- Born: Fernando Ocáriz Braña; 27 October 1944 (age 81) Paris, France
- Education: Pontifical Lateran University; University of Navarra

Fernando Ocáriz Braña (born 27 October 1944) is a priest of the Catholic Church who has been the prelate of Opus Dei since 2017. Ocáriz is the fourth person to head Opus Dei since its founding in 1928. He is widely published in philosophy and has been a consultor of the Congregation for the Doctrine of the Faith since 1986.

== Life, studies and work ==
Fernando Ocáriz Braña was born in Paris on 27 October 1944 to José Ocáriz Gómez and María Dolores Braña, and is the youngest of eight children. He joined Opus Dei on 7 September 1961.

In the 1960s, as a theology student, he lived in Rome alongside Josemaría Escrivá, the founder of Opus Dei. He received a licentiate in theology from the Pontifical Lateran University in 1969 and a doctorate in theology from the University of Navarra in 1971.

He was ordained a Catholic priest in 1971, and was especially involved in ministry to young people and to university students during the first years of his priesthood.

Since 1986, he has been a consultor of the Congregation for the Doctrine of the Faith, as well as other departments of the Roman Curia: the Congregation for the Clergy since 2003 and the Pontifical Council for Promoting the New Evangelization since 2011. He has also been a member of the Pontifical Academy of Theology since 1989. In 2009, it was announced that he would participate in the doctrinal discussions between the Society of St. Pius X and the Holy See.

In the early 1980s, Ocáriz was among the professors who began the Pontifical University of the Holy Cross, where he was a tenured professor (now Emeritus Professor) in Fundamental Theology.

Ocáriz was appointed Vicar General of the Prelature of Opus Dei on 23 April 1994. In 2014, he was named Auxiliary Vicar of Opus Dei.

He became the provisional head of Opus Dei upon the death of the prelate of Opus Dei, Javier Echevarria, in December 2016. He was elected prelate of Opus Dei on 23 January 2017, and on the same day Pope Francis confirmed that appointment.

== Bibliography ==
- Fernado Ocariz (2009), Fundamental Theology. Woodridge, Midwest Theological Forum. ISBN 978-1-890177-24-9
- Fernado Ocariz (2015), God, The Church and The World: An Interview with the Auxiliary Vicar of Opus Dei. Downers Grove, Midwest Theological Forum. ISBN 978-1-939231-25-3
- Fernado Ocariz (1991), The Mystery of Jesus Christ
- Fernado Ocariz (1975), El marxismo

Catholic Church titles
Preceded by Javier Echevarría Rodríguez	Prelate of Opus Dei; 23 January 2017	Incumbent
