= Cilibia, Africa =

Cilibia was an Ancient city and bishopric in Roman North Africa, which remains a Latin Catholic titular see.

== History ==
Cilibia, probably at the site of Henchir-Kelbia in present Tunisia, was among the many cities in the Roman province of Africa Proconsularis that were important enough to become a suffragan diocese of the Metropolitan of Carthage, in the papal sway.

Three of its bishops are historically documented, including a schismatic:

- Tertullus was among the Donatist heretical bishops attending the council of Carthage called in 411 by Western Roman emperor Honorius, where their Catholic counterparts saw Donatism condemned
- Restitutus attended the Synod of Carthage (525)
- Johannes (John) participated in the Council of Carthage (646).

== Titular see ==
The diocese was nominally restored in 1933 as Latin titular bishopric of Cilibia (Latin = Curiate Italian) / Cilibien(sis) (Latin adjective).

It has had the following incumbents, of the fitting episcopal (lowest) rank:

- Víctor Manuel López Forero (1985.06.07 – 1994.06.21) as last Military Vicar of Colombia (Colombia) (1985.06.07 – 1986.07.21) and (see) restyled first Military Ordinary of Colombia (1986.07.21 – 1994.06.21); previously Titular Bishop of Afufenia (1977.05.06 – 1980.12.06) as Auxiliary Bishop of Archdiocese of Bogotá (Colombia) (1977.05.06 – 1980.12.06), Bishop of Socorro y San Gil (Colombia) (1980.12.06 – 1985.06.07); later Metropolitan Archbishop of Nueva Pamplona (Colombia) (1994.06.21 – 1998.06.27), Metropolitan Archbishop of Bucaramanga (Colombia) (1998.06.27 – resigned 2009.02.13), Apostolic Administrator of above Socorro y San Gil (2009.05 – 2010.02.02), Apostolic Administrator of Diocese of Montelíbano (Colombia) (2010.09 – retired 2012.02.02)
- Javier Echevarría Rodríguez (Spaniard) (1994.04.20 – 2016.12.12) as (second) Prelate (in charge, like a superior general) of the personal prelature Opus Dei (Italy) (1994.04.20 – 2016.12.12) and Grand Chancellor of Pontifical University of the Holy Cross (1994.04.20 – 2016.12.12)
- Eduard Kava (Ukrainian), O.F.M. Conv. (2017.05.13 – ...), Auxiliary Bishop of the Archdiocese of Lviv (Ukraine) (2017.05.13 – ...).

== See also ==
- List of Catholic dioceses in Tunisia
