= Acta Philosophica =

- Discipline: Philosophy
- Language: English, French, Italian, Spanish
- Edited by: Rafael A. Martínez

Publication details
- History: 1992–present
- Frequency: Biannually

Standard abbreviations
- ISO 4: Acta Philos.

Indexing
- ISSN: 1121-2179

Links
- Journal homepage

Acta Philosophica is a biannual peer-reviewed academic journal that was established in 1992. The editor-in-chief is Rafael A. Martínez (Pontifical University of the Holy Cross). The journal publishes articles in Italian, English, Spanish, and French on all aspects of philosophy, especially concerning science and faith.

== Abstracting and indexing ==
The journal is abstracted and indexed in:

- Arts and Humanities Citation Index
- Current Contents/Arts and Humanities
- MLA International Bibliography
- Scopus
- The Philosopher's Index
