= Mary Queen of the Apostles Seminary =

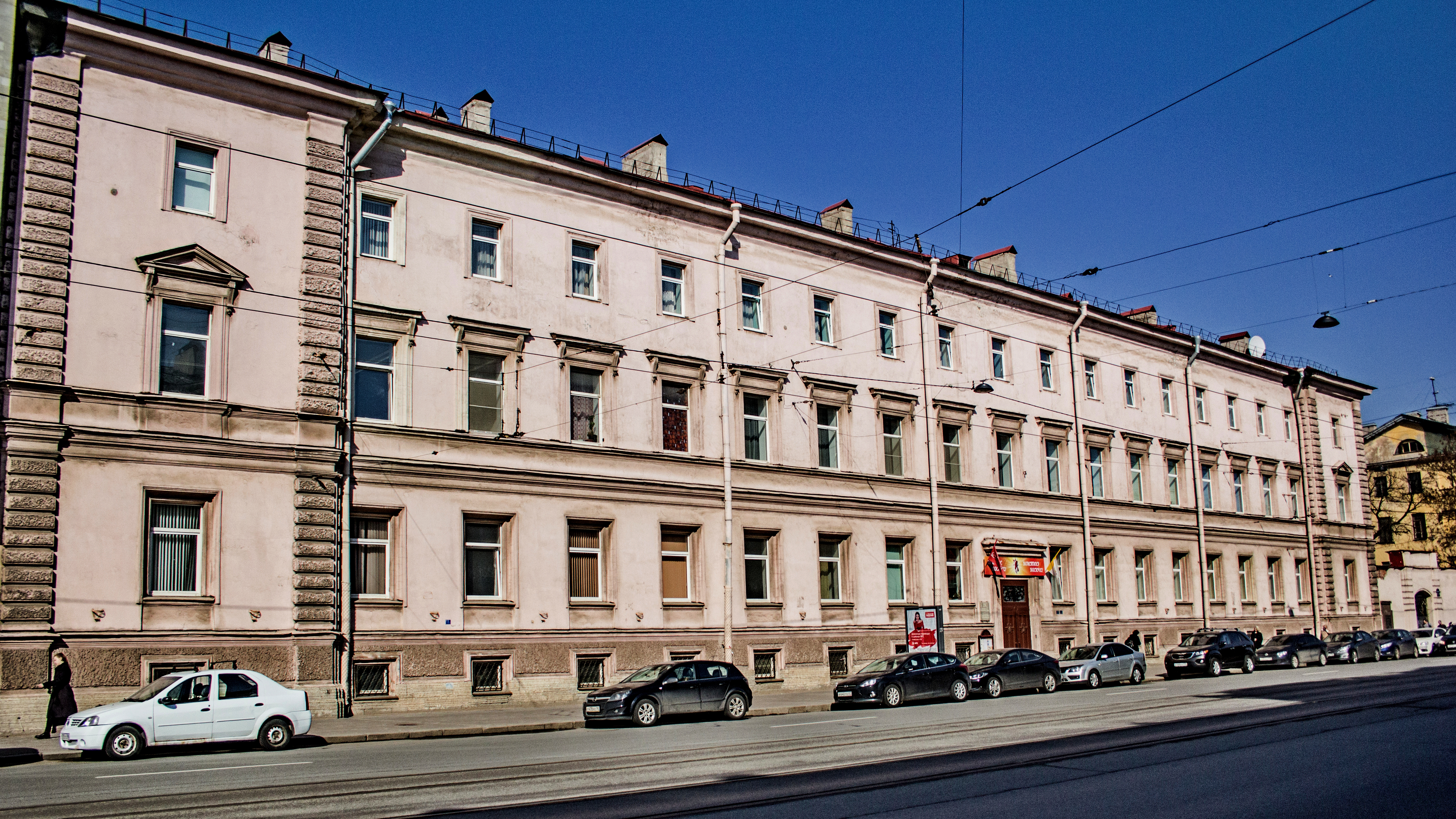
- Type: Private graduate institution
- Established: 1879 (original); 1993 (modern)
- Affiliations: Catholic Church
- Location: Saint Petersburg, Russia; 59.9163°N 30.3121°E
- Website: cathseminary.ru

The Mary Queen of the Apostles Seminary (Note: Russian: Мария — Царица Апостолов, lit. 'Mariya — Tsaritsa Apostolov') is located in Saint Petersburg and is the only Catholic major seminary in Russia. The school prepares candidates for the priesthood in the Catholic Church. The building is part of the Cathedral of the Assumption of the Blessed Virgin Mary.

== History ==
The seminary traces its roots to an order by the tsar to move the Roman Catholic Theological Academy in Vilnius to Saint Petersburg in 1842. This academy became the first Catholic seminary in Russia. The Mary Queen of the Apostles Seminary was opened at its present location in 1879. It remained active until the Russian Revolution, when it was seized by the Bolsheviks in 1918 and turned into an administrative building.

After the dissolution of the Soviet Union, Archbishop Tadeusz Kondrusiewicz declared his intent to reopen a seminary in Russia on Easter Sunday in 1993, and its founding was signed by Pope John Paul II on 29 June 1993. The seminary reopened on 1 September 1993, though it was initially founded in Moscow, at the Cathedral of the Immaculate Conception. At its opening Mass, Archbishop Kondrusiewicz said that "this seminary is the heart of the Catholic Church in Russia." Its first rector was Monsignor Bernardo Antonini.

In the summer of 1995, the original building was returned to the Catholic Church by the Russian government, in a decree signed by then-deputy mayor of Saint Petersburg Vladimir Putin. The Mary Queen of the Apostles Seminary was moved on 12 October 1995 to its current location near the Cathedral of the Assumption of the Blessed Virgin Mary in Saint Petersburg. It was officially recognized as an institute of advanced studies by the Russian Ministry of Education on 29 March 1996, and was declared the interdiocesan seminary for all of Russia by the Holy See in February 1998.

The seminary is currently located on 1st Krasnoarmeyskaya Street in central Saint Petersburg. Since the reopening of the seminary, the first five new deacons were ordained on 31 May 1998, and they were ordained as priests on 23 May 1999. As of 2019, over 700 priests have graduated from the seminary, including 64 since it was reopened in 1993, and two have become saints. Most of the students are from Russia, but some are from other former Soviet countries. The academic staff includes teachers from the Russian Orthodox Church and many foreign teachers from Europe or the United States.

== Notable alumni ==
- Bishop Eduard Kava, the first graduate to become a bishop since it was reopened.
