= Lluís Clavell Ortiz-Repiso =

Spanish Catholic priest and philosopher (born 1941)

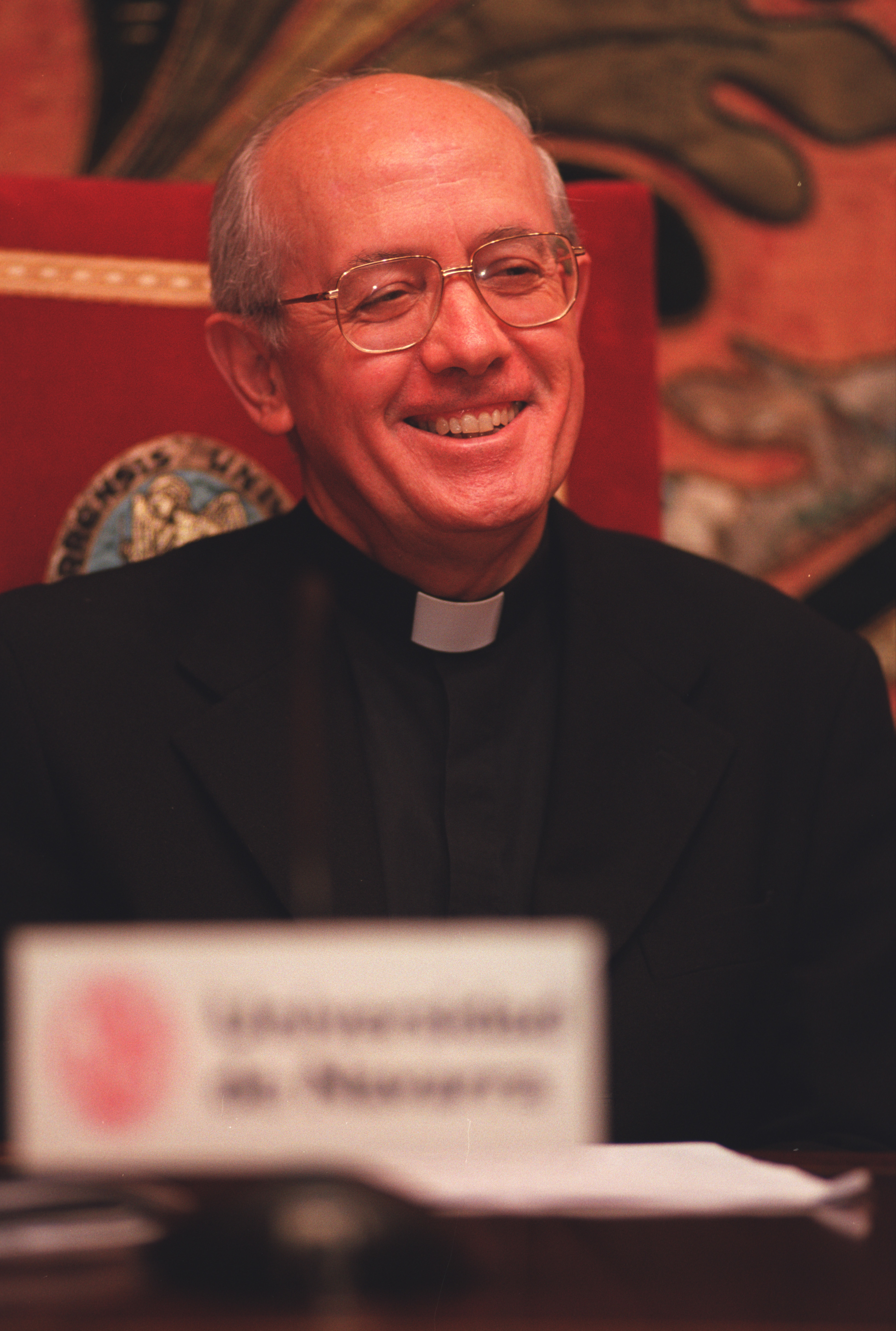

Lluis Clavell Ortiz-Repiso (born 13 October 1941) is a Spanish Catholic priest and philosopher.

== Career ==
Although born in Barcelona, he spent all his childhood in Arenys de Mar where his father was the director of "El Forn del Vidre" (a Philips lamp factory). He was ordained priest on 7 August 1966, along with 23 other members of the Opus Dei, celebrating his first Mass on 16 August 1966 in the Church of the Royal Monastery of Santa Maria de Pedralbes.

Clavell was professor of philosophy at the University of Navarra. Graduated in Philosophy at the University of Barcelona he became an alumnus of the Pontifical Lateran University in Rome where he earned a Doctorate in Philosophy.

Clavell is Professor of Metaphysics at the Pontifical University of the Holy Cross (Rome), of which he was rector. In the present, he is a member of the Roman Curia as President of the Pontifical Academy of St. Thomas Aquinas.

== Work ==
- György Lukács. Historia y conciencia de clase y estética, Madrid, Magisterio Español, 1975, 204 pp. ISBN 8426553044
- Metafísica, Pamplona, EUNSA, 1984, 247 pp. ISBN 8431307358
- Metafisica e libertà, Roma, Armando, 1996, 207 pp. ISBN 8871445791
- Metaphysics, Manila, Sinag-Tala, 1991, XII, 249 pp. ISBN 971117197X
- El nombre propio de Dios según Santo Tomás de Aquino, Pamplona, EUNSA, 1980, 201 pp. ISBN 8431306378
- Razón y fe en la universidad: ¿oposición o colaboración?, Pamplona, Servicio de Publicaciones de la Universidad de Navarra, 2011, 10 pp. ISBN 9788492989065
- Carlos Cardona, Olvido y memoria del ser, edición de Ignacio Guiu y Lluís Clavell, Pamplona, EUNSA, 1997, 517 pp. ISBN 8431315210

== See also ==
- Priestly Society of the Holy Cross
- Timeline of Opus Dei
