= Pontifical University of the Holy Cross =

Pontifical university in Rome

- Pontificia Università della Santa Croce
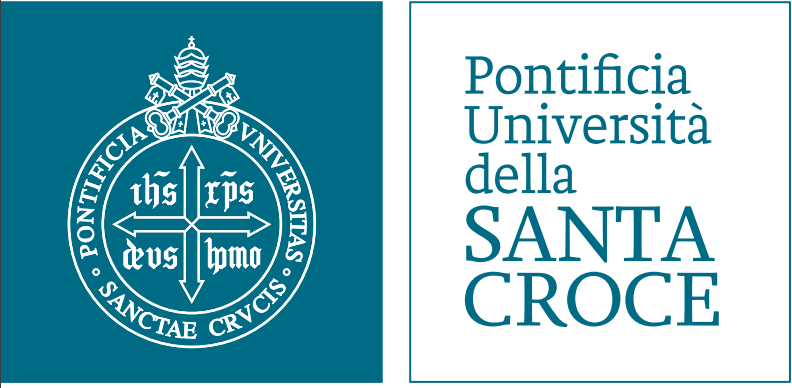
- Latin: Pontificia Universitas Sanctae Crucis
- Motto: Omnes traham ad meipsum
- Type: Private pontifical university
- Established: 15 October 1984 (42 years ago)
- Affiliations: Catholic, Opus Dei
- Chancellor: Msgr. Fernando Ocáriz
- Rector: Rev. Fernando Puig
- Location: Piazza di Sant'Apollinare, 49; Rome, Italy; 41°54′03″N 12°28′25″E
- Website: pusc.it

Pontifical University of the Holy Cross (Latin: Pontificia Universitas Sanctae Crucis, Italian: Pontificia Università della Santa Croce) is a Roman Catholic university under the Curial Congregation for Catholic Education, now entrusted to the Prelature of the Holy Cross and Opus Dei, or more commonly called Opus Dei. It was started in 1984 by Opus Dei, with the aim of offering the universal church an effective instrument for formation and research.

Located in the city center of Rome, the Pontifical University of Santa Croce has two campuses. One is in Piazza di Sant'Apollinare, northern area of Piazza Navona. The other is the library in Via dei Farnesi near the famous Palazzo Farnese. Its stated mission is "to serve the whole Church by means of a broad and thorough work of research and formation in the ecclesiastical sciences, cooperating according to its special function with the evangelizing mission of the Church in the whole world."

Pope John Paul II granted the title of 'university' to the Pontifical Atheneum of the Holy Cross in July 1998, making it the sixth pontifical university in the city of Rome. The university is open to lay people, both men and women, priests, seminarians, and religious brothers and sisters.

The present Grand Chancellor of the Pontifical University is the Prelate of Opus Dei, Msgr. Fernando Ocáriz.

== Background ==
According to Cardinal José Saraiva Martins, secretary of the Vatican Congregation for Catholic Education, "For the University of the Holy Cross the adjective 'Pontifical' has never been a merely decorative title, but a qualification which commits it profoundly, inviting it to active fidelity to the Roman Pontiff," and, in union with him, "to the Church as a whole."

"St. Josemaría Escrivá", he said, "was able to emphasize the need to unite this moral rectitude and love of truth with respect for the autonomy of the disciplines and, therefore, of the legitimate freedom of teachers and researchers, showing a unitary conception of the world and of man, capable of putting learning always at the service of the person."

== Faculty ==
Most of the over 250 faculty hold degrees from both secular and ecclesiastical universities. It offers an ongoing formation both to its academic staff to students, providing them with information on current issues. The ratio of academic staff to students is 1:9. The members of the faculty know and use at least five major modern languages (Italian, English, Spanish, French, and German), which enables them to fulfill their academic task of teaching international students coming from all five continents, different cultures and language groups.

== Courses ==
The Pontifical University of Santa Croce offers courses in ecclesiastical sciences. It now has four Schools: Theology, Canon Law, Philosophy, and Social Institutional Communication. The university also has a Higher Institute of Religious Sciences which has correspondence learning.

The university sponsors the Center of Research into the Relationship Between Family and Mass Media, as well as supporting several research projects, including Market, Culture and Ethics; Etica e Politika; Poetics and Christianity; and Science, Theology, and the Ontological Quest.

Santa Croce lectures also include courses on Christian Art and Architecture in Rome. From Antiquity to the Present (in English), open to students of US universities with campus in Rome. These courses intersperse classroom sessions with site visits. Students are encouraged to combine both the visual and contextual analysis of artworks.

== Research and publications ==
During the academic year 2005–06, 40 books by faculty members and 78 doctoral theses were published.

The scientific journals of the Pontifical University of Santa Croce are:

- Church, Communication and Culture by the Faculty of Communication
- Annales Theologici by the Faculty of Theology
- Ius Ecclesiae by the Faculty of Canon Law
- Acta Philosophica by the Faculty of Philosophy

== Governance and leadership ==
The Prelate of Opus Dei serves as the Grand Chancellor of the Pontifical University of the Holy Cross, who appoints a rector after having heard the opinion of the university's governing bodies and the Academic Senate, and received confirmation from the Holy See's Dicastery for Culture and Education.

Grand Chancellors:

- Álvaro del Portillo (1984–1994)
- Javier Echevarría Rodríguez (1994–2016)
- Fernando Ocáriz Braña (2017–present)

Rectors:

- Ignacio Carrasco de Paula (1984–1994)
- Luis Clavell (1994–2002)
- Mariano Fazio (2002–2008)
- Luis Romera Oñate (2008–2016)
- Luis Navarro (2016–2024)
- Fernando Puig (2024–present)

== Enrollment and other data ==
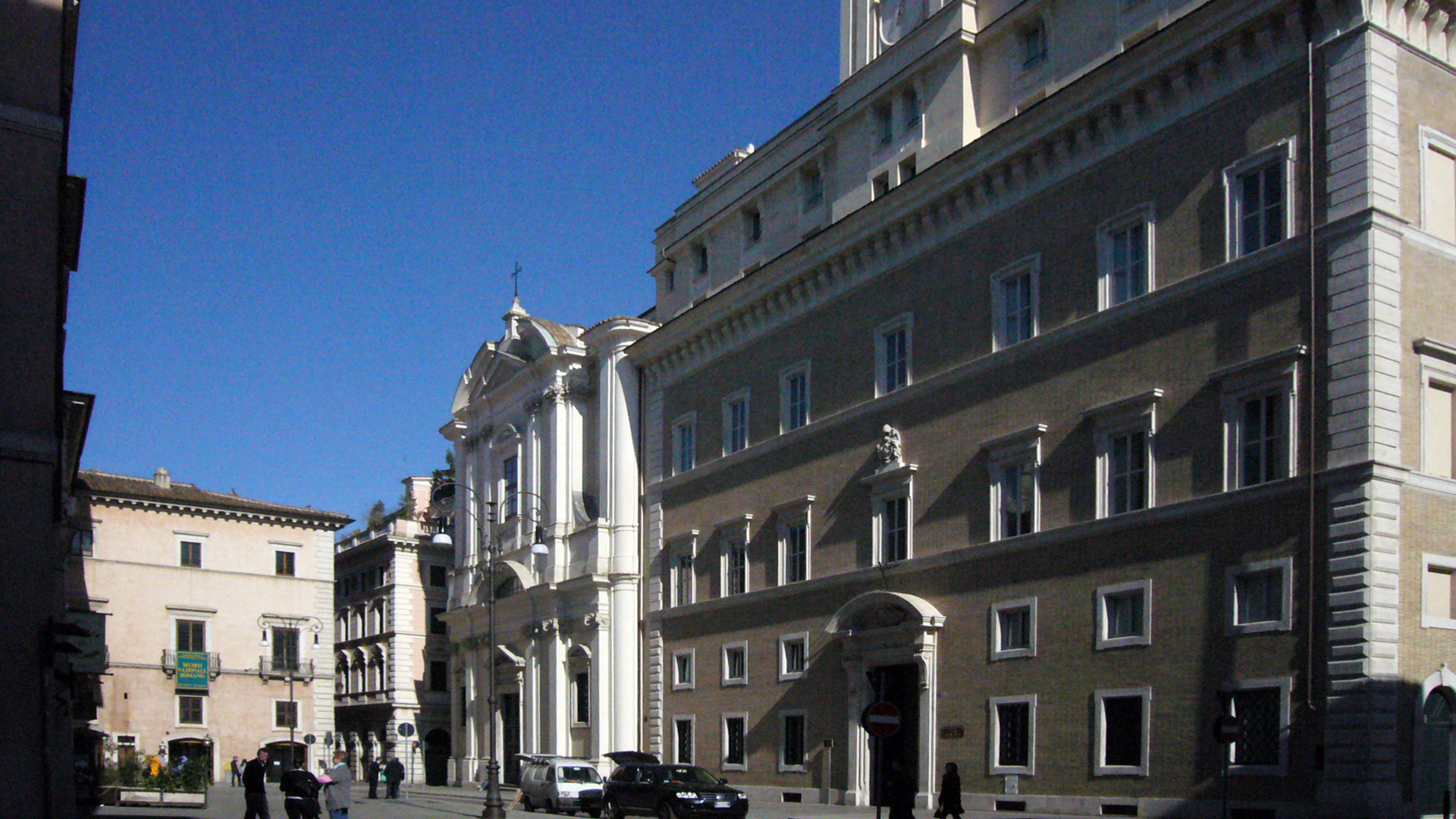
Palazzo di Sant'Apollinare (as main building) and the university church of the Pontifical University of Santa Croce

For the school year 2013–14, the university has more than 1,050 students, about half from Europe and one-third from the Americas, with the others coming from Africa and Asia (both about one-tenth) and Oceania (less than one percent). 25% of the students are laypeople, 32% seminarians, 32% priests, and 11% religious. The majority (599) are studying theology. 192 are studying canon law, 128 philosophy, and 106 communications, with 25 auditing courses. Since its beginning in 1984, more than 7,000 students from 102 countries have passed through the Pontifical University of the Holy Cross in its 25-year history.

The university is supported financially by contributions from benefactors from all over the world.

The university is located in the Palazzo di Sant'Apollinare on Piazza di Sant'Apollinare 49, Rome. Its library is at Via dei Farnesi 82, near the famous Palazzo Farnese. The University of the Holy Cross Foundation is located in New York, New York, U.S.

== Seal ==
The university seal was described in an address of John Paul II to the administrators, faculty, staff, and students of the university on May 29, 1999:

Your university's coat of arms uses a design of Bl. Josemaría Escrivá and recalls the meaning of your work. Its central element is a Greek cross whose arms end in arrowheads. It looks as if the Cross is extended in every direction, reaching out to embrace humanity and the whole universe. Next to the Cross we read the words Iesus Christus, Deus Homo. What a meaningful synthesis of the orientation of your teaching and research! The Cross is the supreme revelation of the mystery of the incarnate Word, perfectus Deus, perfectus homo (cf. Creed Quicumque). In his ineffable love, the crucified Christ reveals in a striking way the Father's infinite mercy for human beings in all ages.[...] [A]s Bl. Josemaría Escrivá loved to repeat, Lux in Cruce, gaudium in Cruce, requies in Cruce: the light, joy and peace which flow from the plan of salvation. Only by letting itself be immersed by the Holy Spirit in Christ's mystery, will theological thought be enlightened with wisdom and fully understand the meaning of the Cross, the path of human salvation, of the purification of heart and mind.
