= Leon Dubrawski =

The Most Reverend Maksymilian Leonid Dubrawski O.F.M.
- Bishop of Kamianets-Podilskyi
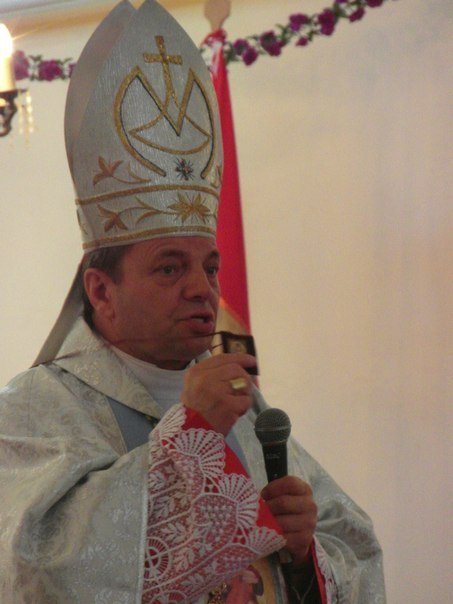
- Native name: Максиміліан Леон Дубравський
- Church: Roman Catholic Church
- Diocese: Kamyanets-Podilskyi
- See: Kamyanets-Podilskyi
- Appointed: 4 May 2002
- Installed: 3 July 2002
- Term ended: 1 July 2025
- Predecessor: Jan Olszanski
- Successor: Eduard Kava
- Previous posts: Titular Bishop of Trofimiana (1998-2002); Auxiliary Bishop of Kamyanets-Podilsky (1998-2002)

Orders
- Ordination: 29 May 1983 by Julijans Vaivods
- Consecration: 27 June 1998 by Marian Jaworski

Personal details
- Born: Maksymilian Leonid Dubrawski; 1 July 1949 (age 77) Dubovets, Zhytomyr Oblast, Ukrainian SSR
- Motto: Pax et bonum ("Peace and Good")
- Coat of arms: Maksymilian Leonid Dubrawski's coat of arms

Maximilian Leon Dubrawski (Ukrainian: Максиміліан Леон Дубравський; born 1 July 1949) is the Roman Catholic bishop of Kamianets-Podilskyi.

== Life ==
Dubrawski was born near Zhytomyr, present day Ukraine. In 1978 he entered the seminary in Riga. On 31 August 1982 he joined the Franciscan Order (then province Bernardine). He was ordained on 29 May 1983 in Riga, Latvia from Cardinal Julijans Vaivods. On 21 August 1986 he made his final vows. From 1983 to 1993 Dubrawski was pastor in Khmilnyk and the superior of the Custody of the Holy Franciscan Order of St. Michael the Archangel (Bernardine) in Ukraine.

On 7 April 1998 he was appointed as auxiliary bishop in Kamianets-Podilskyi. On 27 June 1998, received episcopal consecration at the hands of Cardinal Marian Jaworski. After the acceptance of the resignation of Bishop Jan Olszanski on 4 May 2002 he was appointed bishop - the Bishop of Kamianets-Podilskyi. In 2008 he was appointed vice chairman of the Ukrainian Episcopate.

His episcopal motto is "Pax et bonum" - Peace and Good.
