= Javier Echevarría Rodríguez =

Spanish Catholic bishop (1932–2016)

His Excellency, The Most Reverend Javier Echevarría Rodríguez
- Prelate of Opus Dei
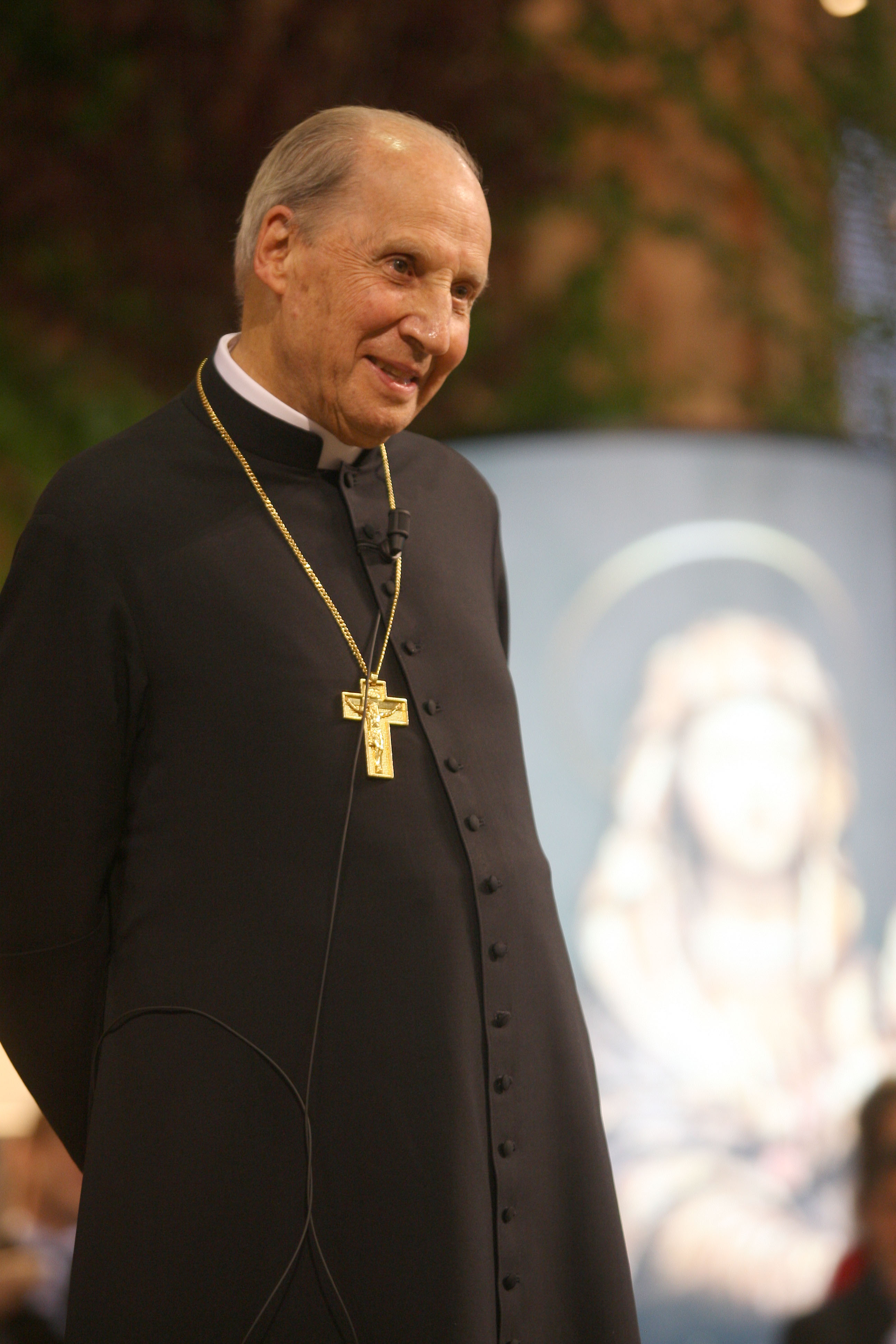
- Church: Catholic
- See: Opus Dei
- In office: 1994—2016
- Predecessor: Álvaro del Portillo
- Successor: Fernando Ocáriz Braña
- Other post: Titular Bishop of Cilibia (1994-2016)

Orders
- Ordination: 7 August 1955
- Consecration: 6 January 1995 by Pope John Paul II

Personal details
- Born: 14 June 1932 Madrid, Spain
- Died: 12 December 2016 (aged 84) Rome, Italy
- Motto: Deo Omnis Gloria
- Coat of arms

Javier Echevarría Rodríguez (14 June 1932 – 12 December 2016) was a Spanish Catholic bishop who served as the head of Opus Dei from 1994 until his death. He held doctorates in both civil and canon law.

Within the Roman Curia, the governing body of the Catholic Church, he was a member of the Congregation for the Causes of Saints and the Supreme Tribunal of the Apostolic Signatura. He wrote a number of books on spirituality: Paths to God: Building a Christian Life in the 21st Century, Para servir a la Iglesia, Getsemaní, Eucaristía y vida cristiana. He also wrote his reminiscences of Josemaría Escrivá: Memoria del beato Josemaría.

Pope Benedict XVI said on the fiftieth anniversary of Echevarria's ordination in 2005 that his pastoral work "provides effective help to the Church in her urgent evangelization of present-day society" and noted the prelate's concern for "culture and the sciences...the defense of life, the family and marriage, and the formation and pastoral care of young people." Pope Francis lauded his "constant service of love to the Church and souls", underlining his "fatherly testimony of priestly and episcopal life".

== Formation ==
Echevarría Rodríguez was born in Madrid, Spain, on 14 June 1932. He began work as the personal secretary of Josemaría Escrivá before being ordained a priest of Opus Dei on 7 August 1955.

In 1954 Echevarría earned a Doctorate in Canon Law from the Pontifical University of Saint Thomas Aquinas, Angelicum.

Echevarría was appointed the Secretary General of Opus Dei in 1975, upon the succession of Escrivá by Álvaro del Portillo as prelate, or head, of Opus Dei. Echevarría later became Vicar General in 1982, when Opus Dei became, on the pope's initiative, a personal prelature.

== Prelate of Opus Dei ==
With the death of del Portillo on 23 March 1994, a period of mourning followed. Rodríguez was elected by Opus Dei's General Council as the second prelate of Opus Dei. He was subsequently confirmed by the Holy See on 20 April 1994, and was then appointed Titular Bishop of Cilibia by Pope John Paul II on 21 November 1994. He was consecrated a bishop by the pope, with Bishops Giovanni Battista Re and Jorge María Mejía as co-consecrators, on 6 January 1995.

When he became prelate he stated that his pastoral priorities were evangelization in the areas of the family, youth and culture. During his term of office, the Opus Dei Prelature began stable formational activities in sixteen countries, including Russia, Kazakhstan, South Africa, Indonesia, and Sri Lanka. He "helped steer Opus Dei toward a period of normalization after the controversies surrounding the canonization of Escrivá in 2002 and then the turbulence of the Da Vinci Code."

Echevarría Rodríguez served as the chancellor of the University of Navarra in Spain, the University of Asia and the Pacific in the Philippines, and various other universities under the spiritual care of Opus Dei.

He participated in the General Assembly of the Synod of Bishops for America in 1997 and of Europe in 1999, and also of the General Ordinary Assembly of 2001 and 2005. On Tuesday, 18 September 2012, he was appointed by Pope Benedict XVI to serve as one of the papally-appointed Synod Fathers for the October 2012 13th Ordinary General Assembly of the Synod of Bishops on the New Evangelization.

On 9 July 2005, Pope Benedict XVI greeted Echevarria on the fiftieth anniversary of his ordination, expressing his "esteem and affection":

Governing your Prelature and contemplating in it the action of God’s grace, you never cease exhorting its members—with your example, with your writings, with your words and your pastoral trips—to remain faithful to the Lord with steadfast purpose (Acts 11:23).

When you foster the eagerness for personal sanctity and the apostolic zeal of your priests and lay people, not only do you see the flock that has been entrusted to you grow, but you provide an effective help to the Church in her urgent evangelization of present-day society.

In the terrain of culture and the sciences, you strive to spread the Christian message in all environments, as is clearly seen in the recently established Pontifical University of the Holy Cross.

You bear in your heart the defense of life, the family and marriage, and the formation and pastoral care of young people.

== Late life and death ==
In 2014, at age 82, he appointed priest Fernando Ocáriz as Auxiliary Vicar, considering an "increase in the work of government required of the Prelate", as well as his age. The Auxiliary Vicar is a position to be filled when needed, holding executive authority, foreseen in the statutes of Opus Dei.

On 5 December 2016 he was admitted to the Campus Bio-Medico University Hospital due to a respiratory infection, where he was treated with antibiotics. On 12 December his condition aggravated leading to a respiratory failure that ultimately caused his death at 21:20 CET.

The day after Echevarría's death, Pope Francis wrote Ocáriz giving condolences to him and all members of Opus Dei, thanking God for his "constant service of love to the Church and souls", underlining his "fatherly testimony of priestly and episcopal life"

Javier's remains were buried inside the crypt of the Prelatic Church of Our Lady of Peace in Rome, next to his predecessor, Álvaro del Portillo.

== Works ==
He wrote works on spirituality such as:

- Memoria del beato Josemaría – reminiscences of Blessed Josemaria
- Itinerarios de vida cristiana – reflections around the turn of the millennium on the ways of Christian life
- Para servir a la Iglesia – a homily on serving the church
- Getsemaní – about praying in union with Christ in his passion
- Eucaristía y vida cristiana – about the centrality of the Eucharist in the life of a Christian
- Por Cristo, con Él y en Él: escritos sobre san Josemaría, Madrid, Palabra, 2007, 1ª, 234 pp.
- Vivir la Santa Misa, Madrid, Rialp, 2010, 1ª, 196 pp.
- Creo, creemos: textos procedentes de las Cartas pastorales dirigidas a los fieles de la Prelatura del Opus Dei durante el Año de la fe (2012-2013), Madrid, Rialp, 2014, 1ª, 127 pp.
- Dirigir empresas con sentido cristiano, Pamplona, Eunsa, 2015, 1ª, 103 pp.

== Some excerpts from his works ==
Bishop Echevarria in a get-together with the faithful of the Opus Dei prelature and their friends

- Christianity is God's nearness to man. It is a close friendship and an intimate relationship between God and man. It expresses the familiarity of a beloved son welcomed with indescribable joy, music, celebration and a great banquet (cf. Lk 15: 22–24).— from Eucaristia y vida cristiana
- Love is the substance of happiness. To love and to know oneself loved is the only true response to the ultimate anxieties of the human heart...Augustine of Hippo briefly expressed this in writing: “Pondus meus, amor meus”. My love is my weight, that which gives me solidity, attracts me and exalts me. It transmits to me height and depth, it is the origin of my peace.
- "To all who received Him, He gave the power to become sons of God" (Jn 1:12). For a Christian, this is not just a way of speaking or calling. Awareness of divine filiation is rooted in a divine gift that transforms a person from within. St. John puts it this way: "See what love the Father has for us, that He has called us sons of God, and so we are!...We are truly children of God" (1 Jn 3:1–2). St. Josemaria concludes that "whoever is unaware of this is unaware of his innermost truth;" he has not yet discovered the deepest reality of his being, nor the meaning of his existence on this earth.
- The secret of the apostolic zeal of a disciple of Christ is rooted in his love for the Master. This is what moves him to give his life for others, to spend it in helping them know the divine Word and to live according to the imperatives of the Love of God. His zeal for souls is born from a love for Christ, which like all true love, implies identification with the person loved.
- On 10 October 2012, during the Seventh General Congregation of the Synod of Bishops he offered this intervention:

The People of God would like the Bishops and priests to be masters of holiness, precisely because they seek it on a daily basis, through the sacramental life and through their own ministry. They must be men who pray with faith, who passionately love the Sacrament of the Eucharist and the Sacrament of the Confession, and who live them with sincere piety, to enrich themselves with graces and to be, therefore, bearers of the Good News to other priests and to all the faithful. Using those methods instituted by Jesus Christ in order to identify oneself with Him ensures that the faithful, listening to priests, listen to the Lord; seeing them pray, they in turn are moved to prayer. Aware that they frequently turn to Confession, they too will seek sacramental forgiveness.

Catholic Church titles
Preceded by Álvaro del Portillo	Prelate of Opus Dei; 20 April 1994 - 12 December 2016	Succeeded by Msgr. Fernando Ocáriz
Preceded by Víctor Manuel López Forero	— TITULAR — Bishop of Cilibia; 21 November 1994 - 12 December 2016	Succeeded by Eduard Kava
