= Sts. Peter and Paul Cathedral, Kamianets-Podilskyi =

Coordinates: 48.6767°N 26.5719°E

Sts. Peter and Paul Cathedral
- Кафедральний собор св. Ап. Петра і Павла
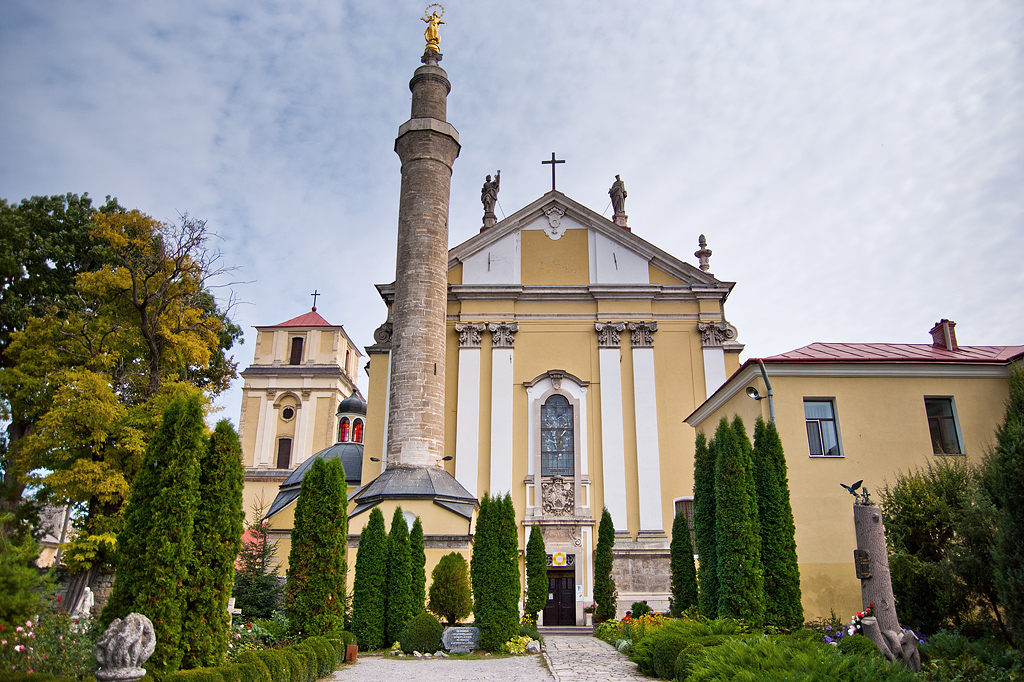
- Sts. Peter and Paul Cathedral
- Location: Kamianets-Podilskyi
- Country: Ukraine
- Denomination: Roman Catholic Church

Administration
- Diocese: Kamianets-Podilskyi

Immovable Monument of National Significance of Ukraine
- Official name: Кафедральний костел (Cathedral)
- Type: Architecture
- Reference no.: 220132/1

The Sts. Peter and Paul Cathedral (Ukrainian: Кафедральний собор св. Ап. Петра і Павла), also called Kamianets-Podilskyi Cathedral, is a religious building affiliated with the Catholic Church which is in the cathedral square in city of Kamianets-Podilskyi in Khmelnytskyi Oblast in the western part of Ukraine.

The temple follows the Roman or Latin rite and is home to the Diocese of Kamianets-Podilskyi (Dioecesis Camenecensis Latinorum, Кам'янець-Подільська дієцезія), originally created in 1373 and restored in 1918.

The church was built in the time of Bishop Jakub Buczacki in the 16th century in Renaissance style. The construction of the stone church is attributed to Bishop Paul from Bojańczyc). In the years 1646–1648, the cathedral was rebuilt in Baroque style. In 1672, during the Turkish occupation of these lands, the temple was transformed temporarily into a mosque and a minaret was built.

The buildings regained its status of a cathedral in 1699. In the middle of the 18th century, the cathedral was rebuilt in late Baroque style. On 14 May 1936 the Communist authorities closed the temple and transformed it into a museum.

It was temporarily open since the summer of 1941 to 4 June 1945. In the years 1946–1990 the church housed a "museum of atheism". On 13 June 1990 the church became functioning again, and on June 29 of that same year the first mass was celebrated.

== Gallery ==
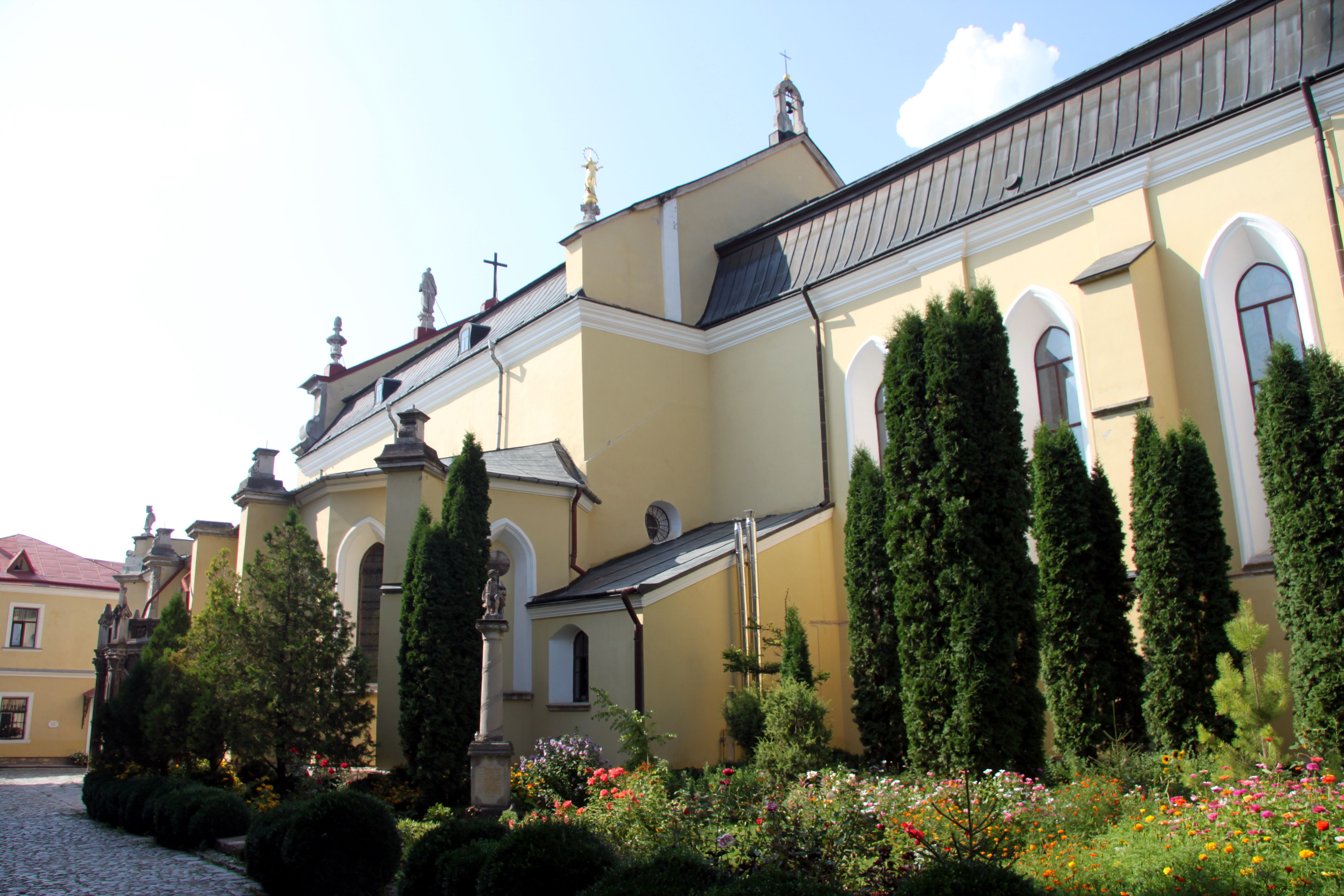

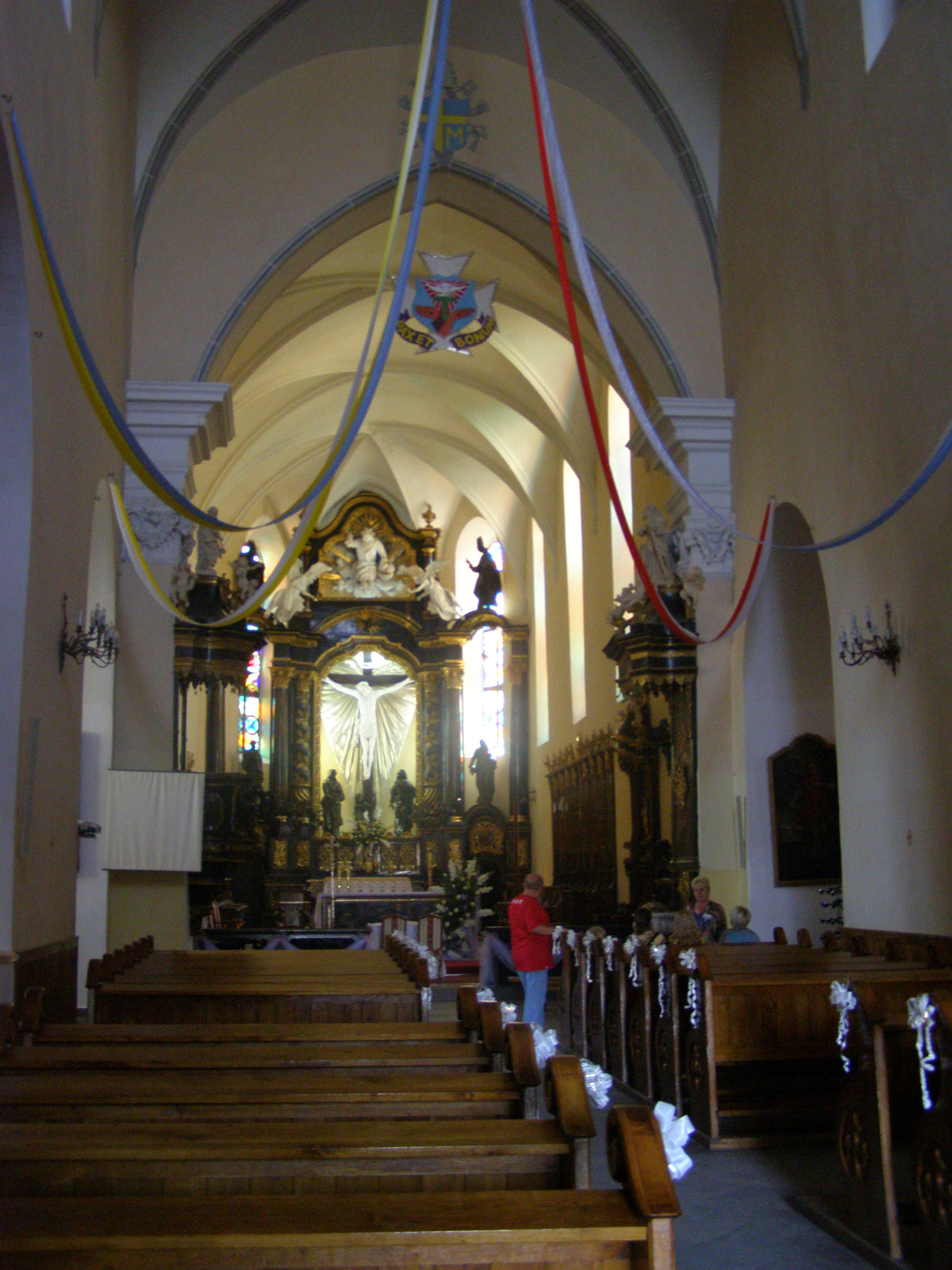
Interior

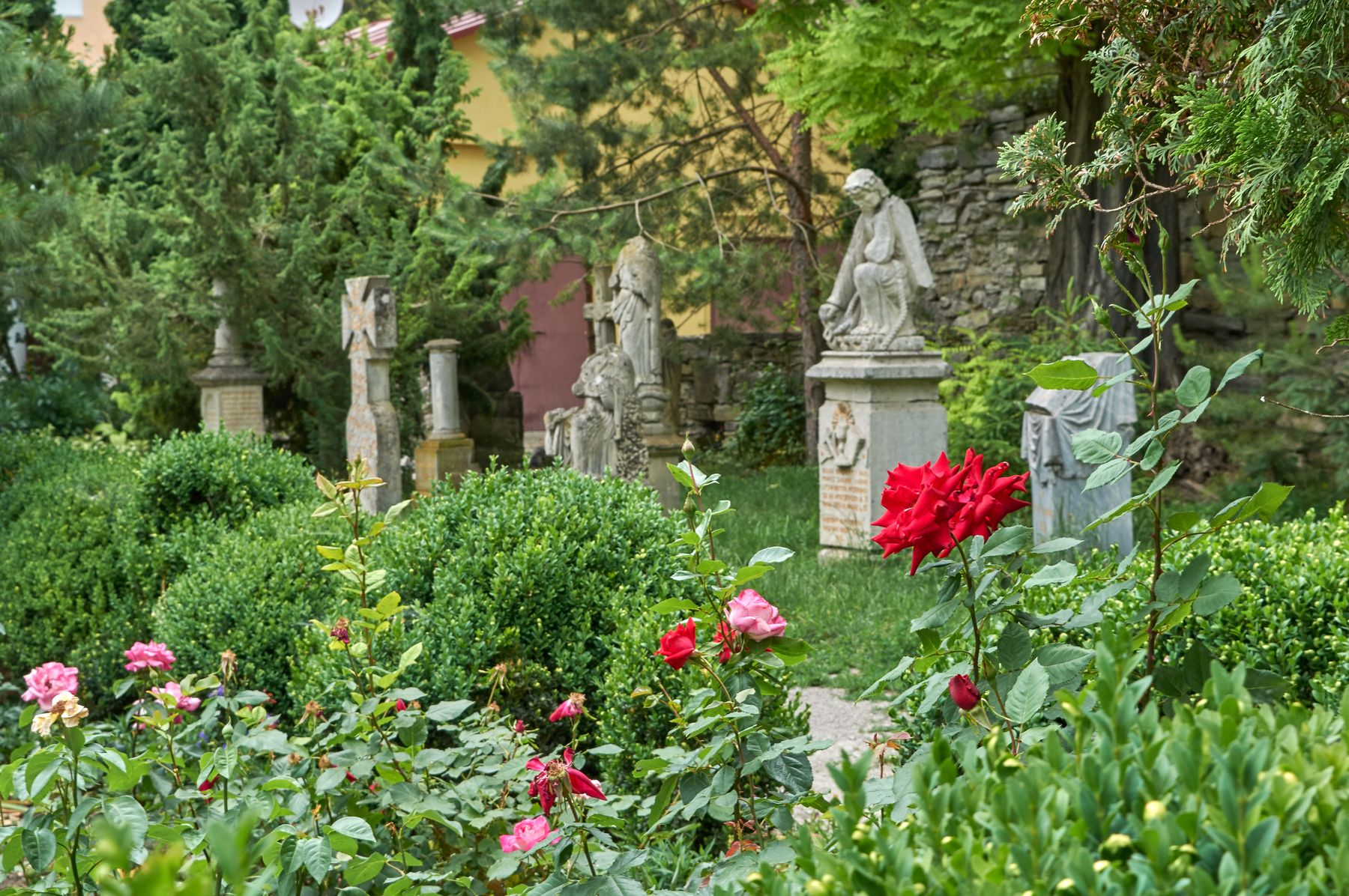
Cemetery

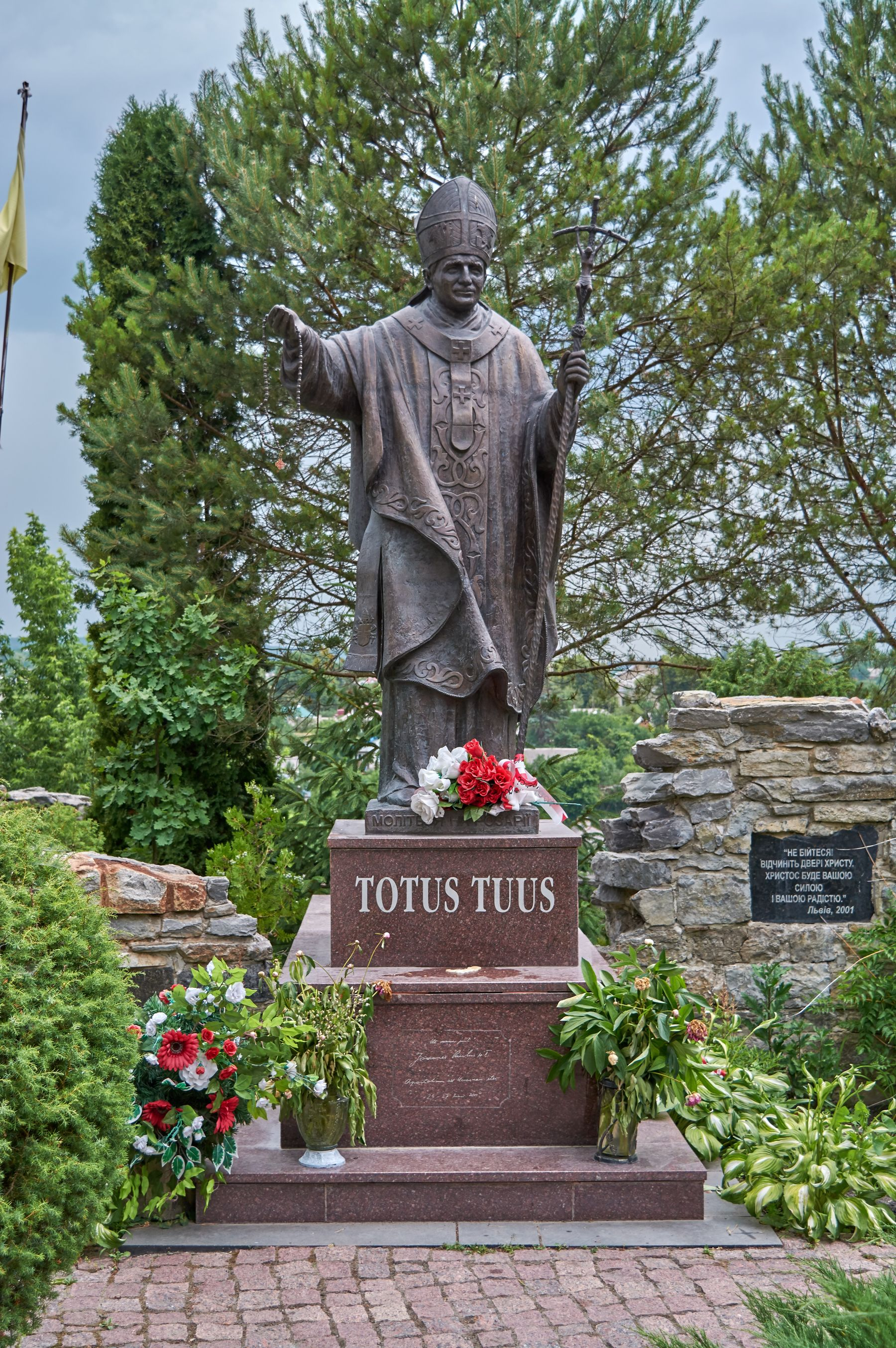
Monument to Pope John Paul II

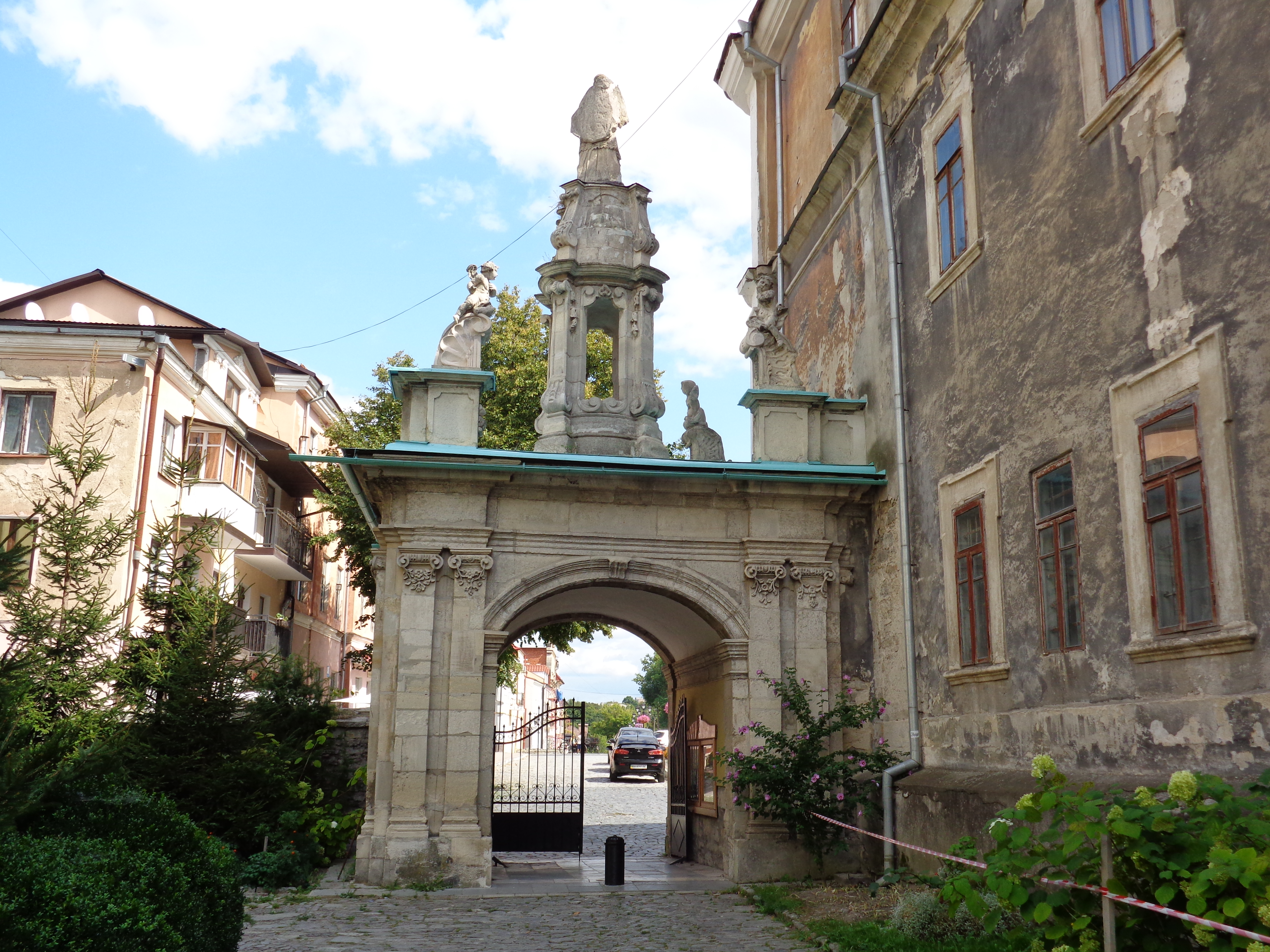
Gate

== See also ==
- Catholic Church in Ukraine
- Sts. Peter and Paul Cathedral
