= Diocese of Kamianets-Podilskyi =

Latin Catholic diocese in Ukraine

Coordinates: 48°40′36″N 26°34′19″E

Diocese of Kamianets-Podilskyi Dioecesis Camenecensis Latinorum Кам'янець-Подільська дієцезія

Catholic
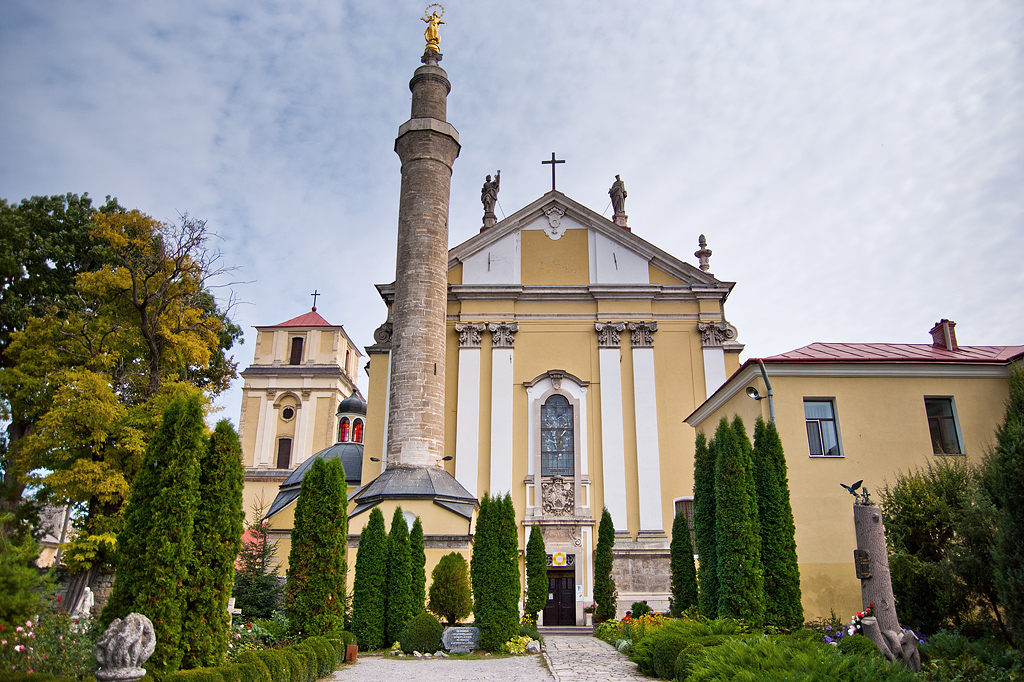

Location
- Country: Ukraine
- Ecclesiastical province: Lviv

Statistics
- Area: 47,100 km^{2} (18,200 sq mi)
- Population: Total; Catholics: (as of 2013); 2,942,800; 250,000 (8.5%)

Information
- Rite: Latin
- Cathedral: Катедральний собор св. Ап. Петра і Павла; Cathedral of Sts. Peter and Paul in Kamianets-Podilskyi

Current leadership
- Pope: Leo XIV
- Bishop: Eduard Kava
- Metropolitan Archbishop: Mieczysław Mokrzycki
- Auxiliary Bishops: Radoslaw Zmitrowicz
- Bishops emeritus: Maksymilian Leonid Dubrawski

Map
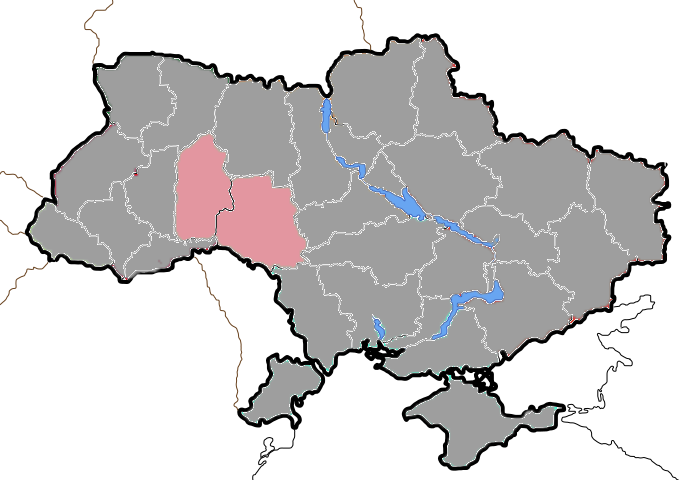

The Diocese of Kamianets-Podilskyi (Latin: Dioecesis Camenecensis Latinorum) is a diocese of the Latin Church of the Catholic Church in Ukraine. Maksymilian Leonid Dubrawski O.F.M is the current bishop of the diocese. He was appointed to the episcopal see of Kamianets-Podilskyi on 4 May 2002.

== History ==
The history of the diocese begins with its founding in the Crown of the Kingdom of Poland around 1375 when Pope Urban VI, on the initiative of then king of Poland Louis I of Hungary, erected the diocese in Kamianets-Podilskyi. It was subordinated to the metropolis of Halych in the administrative region of Halych Land. The borders of the diocese coincided with the borders of the Palatinate of Podolia. From 1412 until 1798 the Kamianets-Podilskyi diocese was subordinated to the Lviv metropolis, in the Ruthenian Voivodeship. In 1772, the diocese had 59 parishes grouped in 6 deaneries: Czornokozynci, Dunaivtsi, Yazlovets, Medzhybizh, Sataniv, Sharhorod. In the diocese, there were 87 churches (including 23 monks and 2 nuns), as well as parish chapels with the permission to celebrate Mass.

In 1795, Russian empress Catherine the Great abolished the Kamianets-Podilskyi Diocese, only to be restored a few years later in 1798 by Paul I of Russia, who placed the Kamianets-Podilskyi bishopric under the authority of the Archbishop of Mogilev as its metropolis. In 1866, the diocese was again abolished by the Tsarist autocracy. From the years 1867-1918 it was administered by the bishops of Lutsk-Zhytomyr.

Pope Benedict XV reactivated the Kamianets-Podilskyi diocese in 1918. The diocese was split on 22 September 1918 from the Diocese of Lutsk, Zhytomyr, and Kamianets-Podilskyi; at the time, the diocese comprised most of the Ukrainian Soviet Republic. From 24 September 1918 the ordained priest of Kamianets-Podilskyi Piotr Mańkowski was received for consecration to Bishop of Kamianets-Podilskyi by the Archbishop of Kraków Adam Stefan Sapieha. The diocese was held in procuration by the Latin Catholic priest Kazimierz Nosalewski until 26 August 1919 when Bishop Mańkowski took over following the arrest of Nosalewski by the Bolsheviks and threatened with execution. After the return of Bishop Mańkowski, Nosalewski who had suffered arrest twice and released, continued to serve as vicar general of the Kamianets-Podilskyi diocese until 1926. On 8 December 1919, the ceremonial ingress of Bishop Mańkowski at Sts. Peter and Paul Cathedral took place in Kamianets-Podilskyi. Six months later, on 5 July 1920, Bishop Mańkowski was forced to leave the diocese and went into exile. At first, he was in Buchach, and then in Volodymyr-Volynskyi in the Diocese of Lutsk. Many priests from the Kamianets diocese worked in the Lutsk diocese during the interwar period.

On 2 September 1922, the clergy, Władisław Dworżecki, Feliks Lubczyński, Antoni Niedzielski, Walerian Szymanski and Ryszard Szyszko-Bohusz were sentenced to death by the Soviet Revolutionary Tribunal in Kamianets-Podilskyi for opposing the confiscation of church property and treason. The sentence was later changed into a prison sentence, from which the convicted priests were bought back by the faithful.

As a result of the political tensions, changes in borders after the Peace of Riga and pressure from the Holy See, Bishop Mańkowski resigned on 9 February 1926 from the bishopric of Kamianets-Podilskyi and became the titular Archbishop of Aenus. On 31 March 1926, the apostolic administrator of the diocese was Jan Świderski. Archbishop Mańkowski died suddenly whilst travelling in a train carriage on 8 April 1933 at the age of 66 years, he was buried in the crypt of Lutsk cathedral.

On 16 January 1991, Pope John Paul II renewed the Kamianets-Podilskyi diocese and appointed bishop Jan Olszanski. In 1993 this diocese gained some territories from the Diocese of Tiraspol. On 10 June 1995 auxiliary bishop of the diocese Stanislaw Padewski, a Capuchin priest, received episcopal ordination in Kamianets cathedral and later became the bishop of the Roman Catholic Diocese of Kharkiv-Zaporizhzhia.

On 7 April 1998, Leon Dubrawski was ordained auxiliary bishop of Kamianets-Podilskyi diocese, he was ordained by the Apostolic nunciature in Ukraine by Archbishop Antonio Franco. He was appointed bishop of Kamianets-Podilskyi diocese on 4 May 2002 when Jan Olszański retired.

In May 2002, the diocese was split in three dioceses, to create the Diocese of Kharkiv-Zaporizhzhia and the Diocese of Odesa-Simferopol.

== Geography ==
The diocese is a suffragan of the Archdiocese of Lviv of the Latins.

== Ordinaries ==
- Stanisław Józef Hozjusz † ( 1722 Appointed – 1733 Appointed, Bishop of Poznań)
- Franciszek Antoni Kobielski † ( 1736 Appointed – 1739 Appointed, Bishop of Luceoria o Łuck)
- Adam Stanisław Krasiński † ( 1757 Appointed – 1798 Resigned)
- Francesco Borgia Machiewiez † (15 March 1815 Appointed – )
- Mikołaj Gòrski † (27 June 1853 Appointed – 1855)
- Antoni Fijalkowski † (23 March 1860 Appointed – 23 February 1872 Appointed, Archbishop of Mohilev)
- Petro Mankowski † (24 September 1918 Appointed – 9 February 1926 Resigned)
- Jan Olszanski, M.I.C. † (16 January 1991 Appointed – 4 May 2002 Retired)
- Maksymilian Leonid Dubrawski, O.F.M. (4 May 2002 Appointed – 1 July 2025 Retired)
- Eduard Kava, O.F.M.Conv. (1 July 2025 Appointed)

== See also ==
- Catholic Church in Ukraine
