= Zbigniew of Łapanów =

- Bishop of Kamianets-Podilskyi
- Diocese: Diocese of Kamianets-Podilskyi
- Appointed: 1411
- Term ended: 1423/1427
- Predecessor: Andrzej
- Successor: Paweł
- Other posts: Auxiliary bishop of Kraków (c. 1395 - c. 1402), Auxiliary bishop of the Archdiocese of Halych (c. 1405-1409)

Orders
- Consecration: C. 1395

Personal details
- Died: 1423 or 1427
- Denomination: Catholic

Zbigniew of Łapanów (d. 1423/1428) was a Catholic priest, titular bishop of Laodicea, auxiliary bishop of Kraków, auxiliary bishop of the Archdiocese of Halych and bishop of the Diocese of Kamianets-Podilskyi.

== Biography ==
Not much is known about Zbigniew's early life but what is known is that He came from a noble family bearing the Drużyna coat of arms, from Łapanów in Szczyrzyc. He was the son of Zbigniew, a Kraków knight, and his first wife; he had four brothers (one of whom, Mikołaj, was also a priest). He probably owed his ecclesiastical career to his family’s influence. He was the first auxiliary bishop of Kraków not to have come from a religious order. The exact date of his appointment as bishop is unknown but is known that by 1395 he was already a suffragan bishop of Kraków and titular bishop of Laodicea. Zbigniew would remain as an auxiliary bishop for around 10 years, in 1395 he would Diocese of Iława, to assist the elderly Archbishop Jakub Strzemię in the summer of 1395, and from there finally return once more to the Kraków diocese.

Even whilst he was still a bishop, Zbigniew was involved in property disputes with his brothers, which were settled in 1397 by an agreement under which he took possession of Kobylec and a quarter of the village of Sędowice. Shortly afterwards, he was involved in a legal dispute with the Abbot of Mogilno over the boundaries of Wola Lubecka and Sędowice. In 1402, he received approval from Pope Boniface IX to serve as parish priest in Gdów. Despite this latest appointment, Zbigniew probably left the Diocese of Kraków in 1402 and moved to the Diocese of Halicz (while formally remaining auxiliary bishop of Kraków and parish priest of Gdów) and arrived in the Ruthenian lands no later than 1405 and assumed the role of auxiliary bishop in the Archdiocese of Halych and leaving after the last bishop of Halych Mikołaj Trąba took over the diocese after the death of Jakub Strzemię in 1409.

In 1411, Zbigniew returned to Kraków but this would not last long as the Antipope John XXIII appointed him Bishop of Kamieniec in 1414, Zbigniew was likely picked for this role by King Władysław Jagiełło to serve as the Crown’s trusted representative in Podolia against Vytautas the Great in which Zbigniew headed the took the lead in Kamieniec in the passive resistance of the local, already numerous Polish nobility against Vytautas. In retaliation Vytautas did not raise the topic about raising the already modest stipend of the Bishop of Kamieniec. Despite his financial situation, however, the bishop retained a strong position at Jagiełło’s court. With his help, the Polish lords in Podolia refused to pay homage to Vytautas for a number of years, although Jagiełło had twice issued this order to them – in 1414 and 1418. Zbigniew was active in military and political affairs at the time where he appeared at the military camp near Czerwińsk during the drawing up of the Polish-Lithuanian-Danish alliance on the 15 July 1419. In September of that year, he was present at the synod of the Archdiocese of Lviv on the 28 September the same year.

It is uncertain when Zbigniew passed away, sources claim that he passed away in 1423 but Zbigniew is stll mentioned in 1426 where he appeared as a papal commissioner in a dispute among clergymen over a benefice in Dolsk, in the Diocese of Poznań and in January 1427 when Jagiełło decided to alleviate the poverty of the Bishop of Kamieniec and petitioned for the right to grant Zbigniew two vacant ecclesiastical benefices in Gniezno, under royal patronage, worth 60 silver grzywnas. Pope Martin V agreed to this, but the decision was made too late, as evident from a letter by the Grand Duke of Lithuania dated 28 November 1427, where it is stated that the bishop died in June 1427 and in which he requested that the Kamieniec bishopric, vacant following the death of Zbigniew be handed to Paweł, provost of the Church of the Holy Spirit in Vilnius.

== See also ==
- Archbishop of Kraków
- Bishops of Kamianets-Podilskyi
