= Diocese of Chełm =

Diocese or Archdiocese of Chełm may refer to the following ecclesiastical jurisdictions with see at Chełm (Kulm) in southeastern Poland :

- the former Roman Catholic Diocese of Chełm, Latin precursor of the suppressed Diocese of Chełm–Lublin and nominally restored as a Latin Catholic titular see
- the suppressed Eparchy of Chełm–Belz (Ruthenian Uniate Church)
- the Archdiocese of Lublin and Chełm of the Polish Orthodox Church
