= Bishops of Kamianets-Podilskyi =

The Bishop of Kamianets-Podilskyi is the head of the diocese of Kamianets-Podilskyi. Its begins with its founding in the Crown of the Kingdom of Poland around 1375 when Pope Urban VI, on the initiative of then king of Poland Louis I of Hungary, erected the diocese in Kamianets-Podilskyi. It was subordinated to the metropolis of Halych in the administrative region of Halych Land.

In 1795, Russian empress Catherine the Great abolished the Kamianets-Podilskyi Diocese, only to be restored a few years later in 1798 by Paul I of Russia, who placed the Kamianets-Podilskyi bishopric under the authority of the Archbishop of Mogilev as its metropolis. In 1866, the diocese was again abolished by the Tsarist autocracy. From the years 1867-1918 it was administered by the bishops of Lutsk-Zhytomyr.

== Bishops ==
List of diocesan bishops of Kamianets-Podilskyi

Term of office	Bishop	Notes
1406–1411	Aleksander	
1411–1413	Andrzej of Klęka	
1414–C. 1423-28	Zbigniew of Łapanów	
1428–1453	Paweł of Bojańczyce	
1453–1467	Mikołaj Łabuński	
1468	Piotr Gołąbek	
1469–1479	Mikołaj Próchnicki	
1484–1490	Maciej ze Starej Łomży	Then becoming the Bishop of the Diocese of Chełm
1492–C. 1500	Piotr z Lesiowa	
1510–1518	Jakub Buczacki	later the Bishop of Chełm, and subsequently the Bishop of Płock
1521–1531	Wawrzyniec Międzyleski	
1531–1535	Piotr Gamrat	Subsequently, the Bishop of Przemyśl, later the Bishop of Płock, the Bishop of Kraków, the Archbishop of Gniezno and Primate of Poland
1535–1538	Sebastian Branicki	Next, the Bishop of the Diocese of Chełm, later Bishop of the Diocese of Poznań
1539–1540	Jan Wilamowski	
1542-1543	Jan Dziaduski	Later the Bishop of Chełm, and subsequently the Bishop of Przemyśl
1543	Mikołaj Dzierzgowski	Later Bishop of the Diocese of Chełm, subsequently Bishop of the Diocese of Kujawsko-Pomorskie, Archbishop of Gniezno and Primate of Poland
1543–1545	Andrzej Zebrzydowski	Later Bishop of the Diocese of Chełm, subsequently Bishop of the Diocese of Kujawsko-Pomorskie, and Bishop of the Diocese of Kraków
1545–1546	Jan Drohojowski	later Bishop of the Diocese of Chełm, and subsequently Bishop of the Diocese of Kujawsko-Pomorskie
1546	Benedykt Izdbieński	and subsequently the Bishop of Poznań
1546–1562	Leonard Słończewski	
1562	Piotr Arciechowski	
1563–1576	Dionizy Secygniowski	
1577–1586	Marcin Białobrzeski	
1587–1590	Wawrzyniec Goślicki	Later Bishop of the Diocese of Chełm, subsequently Bishop of the Diocese of Przemyśl, and Bishop of the Diocese of Poznań.
1590–1591	Stanisław Gomoliński	Later the Bishop of Chełm, and subsequently the Bishop of Łuck.
1594–1607	Paweł Wołucki	Later the Bishop of Łuck, and subsequently the Bishop of Kujawsko-Pomorskie.
1607–1614	Jan Andrzej Próchnicki	then followed by Metropolitan Archbishop of Lviv.
1615–1627	Adam Nowodworski	then becoming the Bishop of Przemyśl, later the Bishop of Poznań.
1627–1641	Paweł Piasecki	later becoming the Bishop of Chełm, and subsequently the Bishop of Przemyśl.
1641–1646	Andrzej Leszczyński	later the Bishop of Chełmno and Apostolic Administrator of the Diocese of Pomerania, and subsequently the Metropolitan Archbishop of Gniezno and Primate of Poland
1646–c. 1657	Michał Erazm Działyński	
C. 1658–1660	Jan Ludwik Stępkowski	
1664–1666	Zygmunt Czyżowski	then the diocesan bishop of Lutsk
1667–1670	Wojciech Koryciński	then the Metropolitan Archbishop of Lviv
1670–1677	Wespazjan Lanckoroński	
1680–1685	Stanisław Wojeński	
1686–1689	Jerzy Albrecht Denhoff	then the Bishop of Przemyśl, later the Bishop of Kraków
1700–1716	Jan Chryzostom Gniński	
1716–1721	Stefan Bogusław Rupniewski	then the diocesan bishop of Lutsk
1722–1733	Stanisław Józef Hozjusz	then the Bishop of the Diocese of Poznań
1733–1735	Adam Augustyn Wessel	
1736–1739	Franciszek Antoni Kobielski	then the diocesan bishop of Lutsk
1739–1742	Wacław Hieronim Sierakowski	then the Bishop of Przemyśl, later Archbishop of Lviv
1742–1757	Mikołaj Dembowski	
1759–1795	Adam Stanisław Krasiński	
1795–1809	Jan Dembowski	
1815–1842	Franciszek Mackiewicz	
1853–1855	Mikołaj Górski	
1860–1872	Antoni Fijałkowski	then the Metropolitan Archbishop of Mogilev
	Kasper Borowski	Apostolic Administrator from 1867 to 1883, and at the same time Diocesan Bishop of Lutsk and Zhytomyr, and subsequently Diocesan Bishop of Płock
	Szymon Marcin Kozłowski	Apostolic Administrator from 1883 to 1891, concurrently serving as Bishop of the Diocese of Lutsk and Zhytomyr, subsequently Archbishop-Metropolitan of Mohyliv, and also Apostolic Administrator of the Diocese of Minsk
	Cyryl Lubowidzki	Apostolic Administrator from 1897 to 1898, and at the same time Diocesan Bishop of Lutsk and Zhytomyr
	Bolesław Hieronim Kłopotowski	Apostolic Administrator from 1899 to 1901, and at the same time Diocesan Bishop of Lutsk and Zhytomyr, subsequently Archbishop of the Metropolis of Mogilev
	Karol Antoni Niedziałkowski	Apostolic Administrator from 1901 to 1911, and at the same time Diocesan Bishop of Lutsk and Zhytomyr
	Ignacy Dubowski	Apostolic Administrator from 1916 to 1918, and at the same time Diocesan Bishop of Lutsk and Zhytomyr
1918–1926	Piotr Mańkowski	
1991–2002	Jan Olszański	
2002–2025	Leon Dubrawski	
Since 2025	Edward Kawa	

=== Auxiliary bishops of Kamianets-Podilskyi ===
Term of office	Bishop	Notes
1641– c. 1658	Jan Ludwik Stępkowski	coadjutor bishop, and subsequently diocesan bishop of Kamianets-Podilskyi
1723–1724	Michał de la Mars	
1730– before 1779	Adam Wojna Orański	
1778–?	Jan Ignacy Dłuski	
1828–1841	Ignacy Ludwik Pawłowski	then the Metropolitan Archbishop of Mogilev
1858–1860	Antoni Fijałkowski	later the diocesan bishop of Kamieniec, and subsequently the Metropolitan Archbishop of Mogilev
1995–1998	Stanisław Padewski	later Auxiliary Bishop of Lviv, and subsequently Diocesan Bishop of Kharkiv-Zaporizhzhia
1998–2002	Leon Dubrawski	and then the Bishop of Kamianets
2006–2020	Jan Niemiec	
Since 2013	Radosław Zmitrowicz	

== See also ==
- Diocese of Kamianets-Podilskyi
