= Jan Dziaduski =

- Bishop of Przemyśl
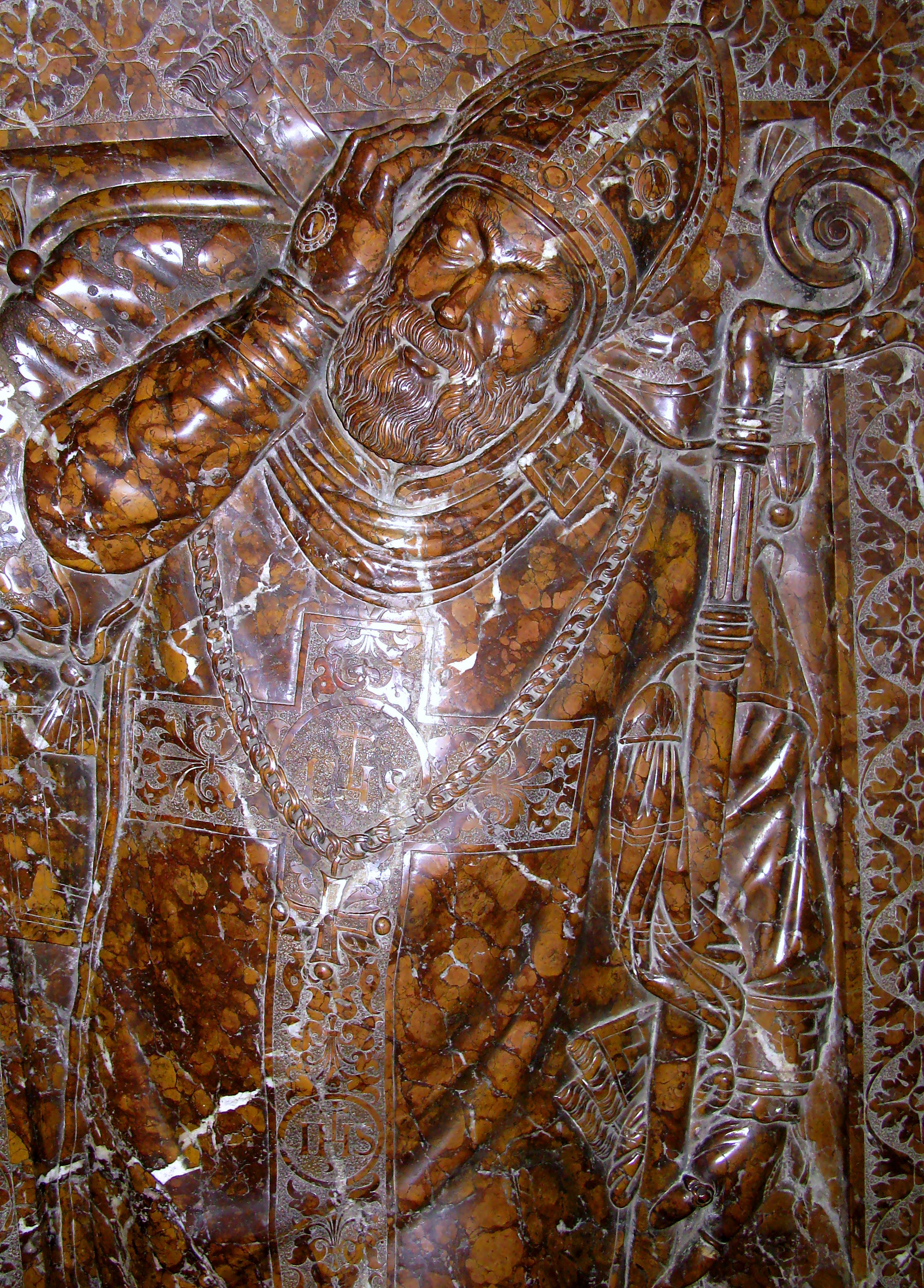
- Jan Dziaduski tomb effigy in Przemyśl Cathedral
- See: Archdiocese of Przemyśl
- Installed: 1545
- Term ended: 1559
- Predecessor: Stanisław Tarło
- Successor: Filip Padniewski
- Previous posts: Titular Bishop of Munatiana (1540); Auxiliary Bishop of Włocławek (1540-1543); Bishop of Kamianets-Podilskyi (1542-1543)

Personal details
- Born: c. 1496
- Died: 28 May 1559 Brzozów, Kingdom of Poland
- Buried: Przemyśl Cathedral

Jan Dziaduski (c. 1496 - 28 May 1559) was a Polish bishop, Titular Bishop of Munatiana, Auxiliary Bishop of Włocławek, Bishop of Kamianets-Podilskyi and Bishop of Przemyśl.

== Biography ==
The Jelita coat of arms of which Jan Dziaduski and his family belonged to.

Jan Dziaduski was born around 1496 into the Jelita family, a knightly family from Opoczno, he was the son of Mikołaj, owner of Kraśnica and Maliszyce, and Katarzyna of Drzewica (of the Ciołek family), castellan of Żarnow, sister of Primate Maciej Drzewicki, who successively served as Vice-Chancellor of the Crown and Bishop of Gniezno. He was the younger brother of Jakub Dziaduski, a Bernardine monk, titular bishop of Enna and suffragan bishop of Poznań from 1540 to 1568. Dziaduski studied in Kraków, Bologna where he gained a doctorate in both laws) and in Rome. Thanks to his uncle’s patronage, he became a canon in Włocławek and Poznań (in 1537, from which, however, he resigned in 1541 in favour of his brother Jakub), as well as the provostship of Kruszwica; in addition, he also held the archdeaconry of Łowicz and, it is said, the provostship of Kielce.

The Diocese of Włocławek, which had become vacant following the death of Aleksander Myszczyński, Jan Dziaduski was elected by the local cathedral chapter to succeed Łukasz Górka; he received a papal commission from Pope Paul III for the Titular Bishopric of Munatiana on 1 December 1540. Together with permission to exercise pontifical functions in the Diocese of Włocławek and the grant of the revenues customarily due to suffragans there. Later that same month, Leonard Hermann, acting on his behalf, settled the matter of the due fees with the Roman Curia the matter of the due fees. Despite his elevation to the episcopal dignity, the clergyman in question continued to serve as archdeacon of the cathedral chapter in Włocławek and provost of Kruszewiec, and was furthermore appointed official. However, after a year and a half, Jan Dziaduski was promoted on 31 May 1542 to the Bishopric of Kamianets-Podilskyi, whilst remaining in the Diocese of Włocławek, where he is attested with the title of nominee for Kamieniec and, at the same time, local suffragan. He presumably intended to serve here only until he received the letters of transfer; however, their arrival coincided with the death of the ordinary, Łukasz Górka (3 October 1542).

Due to these circumstances, he did not leave the Diocese of Włocławek, but continued to perform pontifical duties there during the period of the vacancy. On the 3 March 1543, Pope Paul III simultaneously transferred Mikołaj Dzierzgowski from the Bishopric of Chełm to that of Włocławek, and from the Bishopric of Kamianets-Podilskyi to Chełm, and six months later, on 5 October 1543, he granted a provision for the titular see of Margarit to the new suffragan bishop appointed for Włocławek, the Dominican Walerian of Warsaw.

Jan Dziaduski’s ministry in the Diocese of Włocławek had ended, although it is contested that Dziaduski held the suffragan see there until 1545, that is, until the time of his transfer to the Bishopric of Przemyśl (8 June 1545).

Having canonically assumed the Bishopric of Przemyśl through a procurator delegated for that purpose. On 9 May 1545, and having personally completed his entrance into the cathedral six days later (15 May 1545), Dziaduski remained there until his death. In 1546, this bishop convened a diocesan synod in the diocese entrusted to him, at which, amongst other matters, the issue of a highly controversial member of the Przemyśl presbytery was addressed which was Stanisław Orzechowski.

It was only towards the end of 1550 that, despite his priestly office, he entered into marriage; Bishop Dziaduski, who had previously sought to defuse the growing conflict, was forced to suspend and excommunicate him, which took place in April 1551. Unexpectedly, this matter soon became the subject of deliberation at the Sejm sitting from 2 February to 11 April 1552 in Piotrków, at which Orzechowski also appeared in person and, having shown repentance, received, at the provincial synod taking place at the same time, a conditional lifting of the excommunication, which, however, was later reinstated at the request of the Apostolic Nuncio Aloisio Lippomano. It was not until 1560 that the priest, who was at odds with his bishop, secured a second lifting of the excommunication, with the prior consent of the Holy See. Jan Dziaduski did not, however, live to see this moment, as he died on 28 May 1559 at his residence in Brzozów.

Jan Dziaduski was buried in the cathedral in Przemyśl, where a red marble tomb was erected in his honour, featuring a full-length depiction of the hierarch in pontifical vestments.
