= Roman Catholic Diocese of Chełm =

Roman Catholic titular see in Poland

Diocese of Chełm Dioecesis Chelmensis Diecezja chełmska
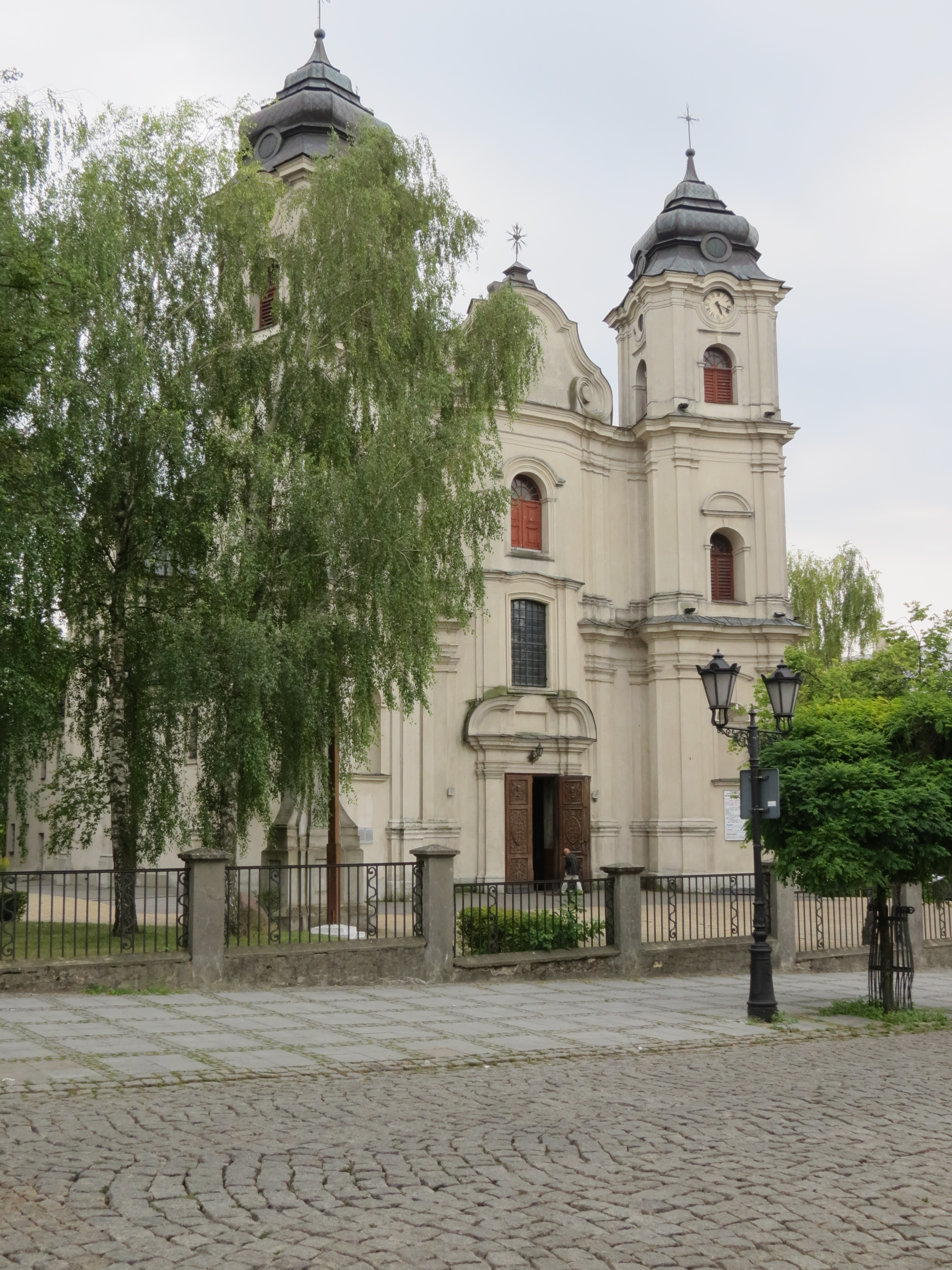
- Former Cathedral in Chełm

Location
- Country: Poland
- Ecclesiastical province: Lublin

Statistics
- Area: 35.28 km^{2} (13.62 sq mi)
- Parishes: 0

Information
- Rite: Roman Rite
- Established: 1257
- Cathedral: Cathedral of the Holy Apostles
- Secular priests: 0

Current leadership
- Pope: Leo XIV
- Bishop: Stanisław Jamrozek
- Metropolitan Archbishop: Stanisław Budzik

The Roman Catholic Diocese of Chełm(-Lublin) was a Latin Catholic bishopric in southeastern Poland, from 1257 (until 1358 as Łuków) until its suppression in 1805, which was restored as Latin titular see in 2009.

== History ==
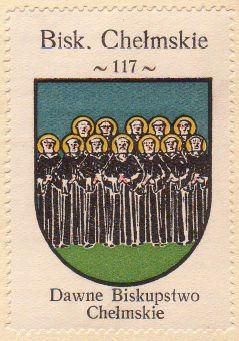
Coat of arms of the Diocese of Chełm

- Established on 1257.02.01 as Diocese of Łuków, on territory split off from the then Roman Catholic Diocese of Kraków
- Renamed in 1358 as Diocese of Chełm
- Lost territory in 1772 to then Diocese of Przemyśl

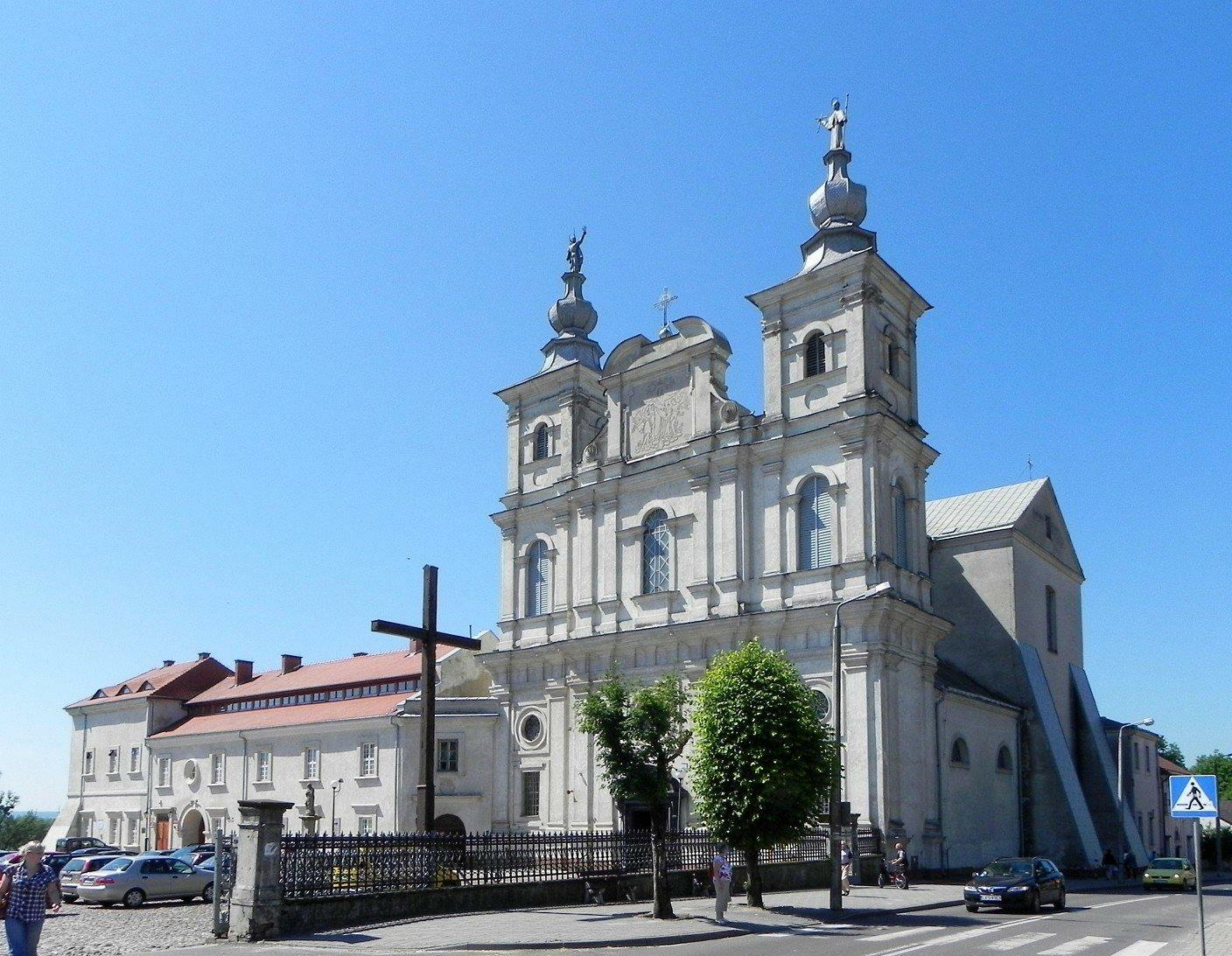
Saint Francis Xavier Cathedral in Krasnystaw, seat of the diocese in 1773–1807

- Cathedral moved to the Saint Francis Xavier church in Krasnystaw in 1773
- Renamed on 1790.08.08 as Diocese of Chełm–Lublin, having gained territory from Diocese of Kraków
- Lost territories repeatedly: in 1798.08.08 to the Diocese of Łuck and Żytomierz and on 1805.06.13 to establish the Diocese of Kielce
- Suppressed on 1805.09.22, its territory being reassigned to establish the then Diocese of Lublin (now Metropolitan).

=== Residential Ordinaries ===
(all Roman Rite)

Suffragan Bishop of Łuków

- Bartłomiej z Pragi, Friars Minor (O.F.M.) (born Bohemia, Czechia) (1257.02.01 – ?)

Suffragan Bishops of Chełm

- Tomasz da Sienno, O.F.M. (1359.05.20 – death 1365), previously Auxiliary Bishop of Diocese of Kraków (Poland) (? – 1359.05.20)
- Stefan da Leopoli, Dominican Order (O.P.) (1380 – death 1416)
- Jan Biskupiec (1417.05.01 – death 1452.04.22)
- Jan Tarnowski (1452.08.18 – death 1462.04.17)
- Paweł z Grabowa (1463.06.14 – death 1479.02.18)
- Jan Kaźmierski (1480.03.06 – 1484.05.10), next Bishop of Przemyśl (Poland) (1484.05.10 – death 1485.11.18)
- Jan z Targowiska (1484.05.14 – 1486.05.26), next Bishop of Przemyśl (Poland) (1486.05.26 – death 1492)
- Maciej ze Starej Łomży (1490.03.14 – death 1505.09.12), previously Bishop of Kamieniec Podolski (Poland) (1484.03.19 – 1490.03.14)
- Mikołaj Kościelecki (1505.11.14 – 1518.05.04)
- Jakub Buczacki (1518.11.05 – 1538.07.29), previously Bishop of Kamieniec Podolski (Poland) (1535.10.27 – 1538.07.29); later Bishop of Poznań (Poland) (1539.03.09 – death 1544)
- Samuel Maciejowski (1539.10.17 – 1541.08.22), next Bishop of Płock (Poland) (1541.08.22 – 1546.04.19), Bishop of Kraków (Poland) (1546.04.19 – death 1550.10.26)
- Mikołaj Dzierzgowski (1542.05.31 – 1543.03.30), previously Bishop of Kamieniec Podolski (Poland) (1541.05.20 – 1542.05.31); later Bishop of Kujawy–Pomorze (Poland) (1543.03.30 – 1546), Metropolitan Archbishop of Gniezno (Poland) (1546 – death 1559)
- Jan Dzieduski (1543.03.30 – 1545.06.08), previously Bishop of Kamieniec Podolski (Poland) (1542.05.31 – 1543.03.30); later Bishop of Przemyśl (Poland) (1545.06.08 – death 1559)
- Andrzej Zebrzydowski (1545.06.08 – 1546.02.19), previously Bishop of Kamieniec Podolski (Poland) (1543.03.30 – 1545.06.08); later Bishop of Kujawy–Pomorze (Poland) (1546.02.19 – 1551), Bishop of Kraków (Poland) (1551 – death 1560.05.23)
- Jan Drohojowski (1546.02.19 – 1551.09.25), previously Bishop of Kamieniec Podolski (Poland) (1545.08.26 – 1546.02.19); later Bishop of Kujawy–Pomorze (Poland) (1551.09.25 – 1557.06.25)
- Archbishop Jakub Uchański (18 November 1551 – 1561), next Bishop of Wrocław (Silesia, Bohemia) (1561.06.02 – 1562), Metropolitan Archbishop of Gniezno (Poland) (1562 – death 1581)
- Mikołaj Wolski (1561.06.02 – 1562.08.31), next Bishop of Kujawy–Pomorze (Poland) (1565 – 1567)
- Wojciech Staroźrebski Sobiejuski (1562.11.06 – 1577.12.11), next Bishop of Przemyśl (Poland) (1577.12.11 – death 1580)
- Adam Pilchowski (1578.06.16 – 1585)
- Wawrzyniec Goślicki (1590.01.22 – 1591.05.10), previously Bishop of Kamieniec Podolski (Poland) (1587.01.07 – 1590.01.22); later Bishop of Przemyśl (Poland) (1591.05.10 – 1601), Bishop of Poznań (Poland) (1601 – death 1607.10.31)
- Stanisław Gomoliński (1591.07.31 – 1600.08.30), previously Bishop of Kamieniec Podolski (Poland) (1590.02.12 – 1591.07.31); next Bishop of Łuck (Poland) (1600.08.30 – death 1604)
- Jerzy Zamoyski (1601.02.19 – death 1621.01.04)
- Maciej Łubieński (1621.05.17 – 1627.04.04), next Bishop of Poznań (Poland) (1627.04.04 – 1631), Metropolitan Archbishop of Gniezno (Poland) (1641 – death 1652)
  - Auxiliary Bishop: Abraham Jan Jacek Śladkowski, Dominican Order (O.P.) (1622.05.02 – death 1643), Titular Bishop of Chytris (1622.05.02 – 1643)
- Remigiusz Koniecpolski (1627.05.17 – death 1640.10.26)
- Paweł Piasecki (1641.11.27 – 1644.11.28), previously Bishop of Kamieniec Podolski (Poland) (1627.12.20 – 1641.11.27); later Bishop of Przemyśl (Poland) (1644.11.28 – death 1649.08.01)
- Stanislaw Pstrokonski (1644.12.22 – death 1657.06.17)
  - Auxiliary Bishop: Mikołaj Roman Świrski- (1644.12.12 – death 1678), Titular Bishop of Chytris (1644.12.12 – 1678)
- Tomasz Leżeński (1658.04.01 – 1667.09.05), next Bishop of Łuck (Poland) (1667.09.05 – death 1675)
- Jan Różycki (1667.11.14 – 1669.06.04)
- Krzysztof Żegocki (1670.06.30 – 1673)
- Stanisław Dąmbski (1673.12.18 – 1676.10.19)); next Bishop of Łuck (Poland) (1676.10.19 – 1682.04.20), Bishop of Płock (Poland) (1682.04.20 – 1692.07.07), Bishop of Kujawy–Pomorze (Poland) (1692.07.07 – 1700), Bishop of Kraków (Poland) (1700 – 1700.12.15)
- Stanisław Jacek Święcicki, Canons Regular of Saint Augustine (C.R.S.A.) (8 February 1677 – death 1696); previously Titular Bishop of Pegæ (1651.03.20 – 1677.02.08) as Auxiliary Bishop of Diocese of Samogitia (Lithuania) (1651.03.20 – 1677.02.08)
  - Auxiliary Bishop: Jan Konstanty Wożuczyński (1680.01.22 – death 1687.01.28), Titular Bishop of Byblus (1680.01.22 – 1687.01.28)
  - Auxiliary Bishop: Jan Dłużewski (1696.06.18 – death 1720), Titular Bishop of Gratianopolis (1696.06.18 – 1720)
- Mikołaj Michał Wyżycki (1699.04.11 – death 1705.01.05)
- Kazimierz Łubieński (14 December 1705 – 10 May 1710), previously Titular Bishop of Heraclea in Europa (1701.01.03 – 1705.12.14) as Auxiliary Bishop of Kraków (Poland) (1701.01.03 – 1705.12.14); later Bishop of Kraków (Poland) (1710.05.10 – 1719.05.11)
- Teodor Wolff von Ludinghausen, Jesuit Order (S.J.) (10 November 1710 – death 9 May 1712), previously Titular Bishop of Tripolis (1701.03.14 – 1710.07.21) as Coadjutor Bishop of Inflanty (Poland) ([1700.04.25] 1701.03.14 – 1710.07.21), succeeding as Bishop of Inflanty (1710.07.21 – 1710.11.10)
- Krzysztof Andrzej Jan Szembek (30 July 1711 – 15 March 1719); later Bishop of Przemyśl (Poland) (1719.03.15 – 1724.09.11), Bishop of Warmia (Poland) ([1724.02.14] 1724.09.11 – 1740.03.16), Apostolic Administrator of Sambia (Prussia) (1724.09.11 – 1740.03.16)
- Alexander Antoni Pleszowice Fredro (29 March 1719 – 27 September 1724), next Bishop of Przemyśl (Poland) (1724.09.27 – death 1734.04.26)
  - Auxiliary Bishop: Walenty Konstantyn Czulski (1721.02.12 – death 1724.02.10?), Titular Bishop of Claudiopolis in Honoriade (1721.02.12 – 1724.02.10?)
  - Auxiliary Bishop: Michał de la Mars (1723.12.20 – death 1725.03), Titular Bishop of Tricomia (1723.12.20 – 1725.03)
- Jan Feliks Szaniawski (29 January 1725 – death 1733), succeeding as former Auxiliary Bishop of Chełm (1713.05.22 – 1725.01.29)
  - Auxiliary Bishop: Józef Olszański (1727.06.25 – death 1738.05.16), Titular Bishop of Serræ (1727.06.25 – 1738.05.16)
- Józef Eustachy Szembek (1736.11.19 – 1753.01.29), next Bishop of Płock (Poland) (1753.01.29 – death 1758.04.01), Bishop of Warmia (Poland) ([1724.02.14] 1724.09.11 – 1740.03.16), Apostolic Administrator of Diocese of Sambia (Prussia) (1724.09.11 – death 1740.03.16)

BIOS TO ELABORATE

  - Auxiliary Bishop: Józef Antoni Łaszcz (1738.06.23 – 1741.08.07)
  - Auxiliary Bishop: Jan Chryzostom Krasiński (1748.09.16 – 1757.03.25)
- Walenty Franciszek Wężyk (1753.04.09 – 1765.04.22), next Bishop of Przemyśl (Poland) (1765.04.22 – death 1766)
  - Auxiliary Bishop: Dominik Józef Kiełczewski (1760.07.21 – 1775.07.14)
- Feliks Paweł Turski (22 April 1765 – 4 March 1771)
- Antoni Onufry Okęcki (1771.03.04 – 1780.03.20)
  - Auxiliary Bishop: Melchior Jan Kochnowski (1775.07.17 – 1788.04.30)
- Jan Alojzy Aleksandrowicz (1780 – 12 September 1781)

Suffragan Bishops of Chełm–Lublin

- Maciej Grzegorz Garnysz (1781 – 6 October 1790)
- Archbishop Wojciech Skarszewski (1790 – 22 September 1805).

== Titular see ==
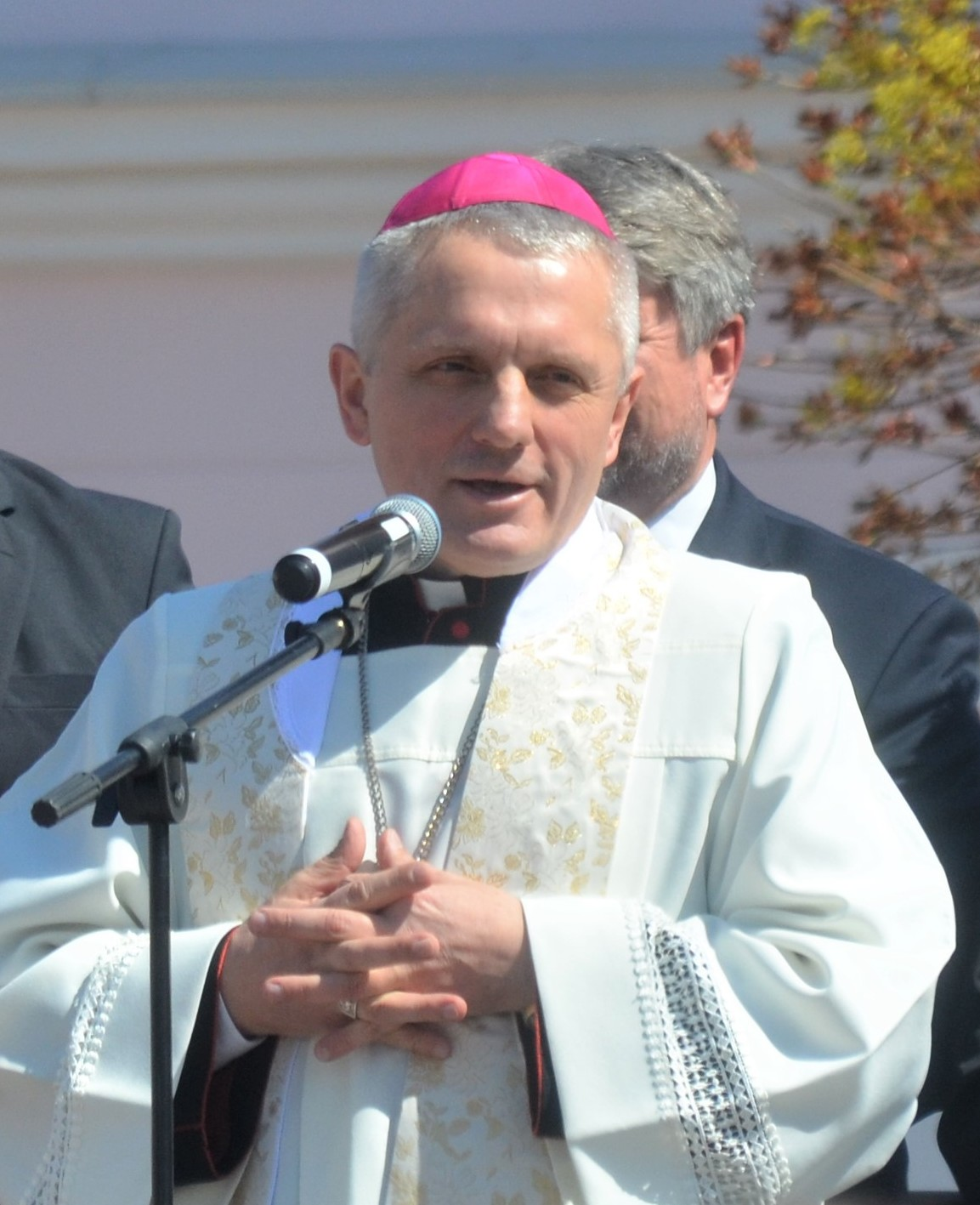
Stanisław Jamrozek, titular Bishop of Chełm since 2013

The diocese was nominally restored in 2009 as Titular bishopric of Chełm / Chelmen(sis) (Latin adjective).

It has had the following incumbents, so far of the fitting Episcopal (lowest) rank :

- Stanisław Jamrozek (2013.04.20 – ...), Auxiliary Bishop of Przemyśl (Poland).

== See also ==
- the former Ukrainian Catholic Eparchy of Chełm–Bełz (Byzantine rite counterpart)
- List of Catholic dioceses in Poland

== Sources and references ==
- GCatholic - data for all sections
