= Archdiocese of Halyč =

Archdiocese of Halyč may refer to the following Catholic ecclesiastical jurisdictions in Slavic Galicia
with archiepiscopal (co-)see at Halych, western Ukraine :

- the old Latin Roman Catholic Archdiocese of Halyč
- the Eastern Catholic (Byzantine rite) Major Archeparchy of Kiev–Galicia (Kyiv-Halych)
