= Paweł of Bojańczyce =

- Bishop of Kamianets-Podilskyi
- Diocese: Kamianets-Podilskyi
- Appointed: 5 May 1428
- Installed: 5 May 1428
- Term ended: March 18 1453
- Predecessor: Zbigniew
- Successor: Mikołaj Łabuński

Personal details
- Born: C. 1370s
- Died: 18 March 1453
- Buried: St. Peter and Paul Cathedral, Kamianets-Podilskyi
- Education: Jagiellonian University

Paweł of Bojańczyc (1370s? – 1453) was a Polish clergyman and Catholic Bishop of Kamianets-Podilskyi.

Pawełs tenure as Bishop of Kamianets-Podilskyi was the longest in the 15th century for the diocese spanning 25 years from 1428 to 1453.

== Biography ==
Paweł of Bojańczyc was probably born in the 1370s or, at the latest, before the 1380s, his father was Mikołaj of Bojańczyce who was likely a village headman. Paweł hailed from the small village of Bojańczyce in Lesser Poland, situated in the vicinity of Szczyrzyc Abbey. It is uncertain when he undertook his university studies, but he was probably enrolled at the Jagiellonian University in the year of its re-establishment, in 1400 and for a time was a precentor at Wawel Cathedral.

It is speculated that the person who fostered the career of Paweł of Bojańczyce in the years that followed was the scholar and prelate Mikołaj of Gorzków. He too came from Lesser Poland and, after studying in Prague, became a Kraków official in 1385, and later even briefly administered the Kraków Diocese as its administrator during a vacancy. With his legal education and experience, he also lectured in law at the Jagiellonian University; following the renewal and reorganisation of the Kraków university in 1400, he became dean of the Faculty of Law, and from 1402–1403 he served as rector of that university. Finally, the year 1407 saw his appointment as Bishop of Vilnius, a position in which – confirmed by the Holy See on 16 January 1408 where he served for six years.

When Mikołaj of Gorzków left Kraków to go to Vilnius he took Paweł of Bojańczyce with him, where Paweł became the canon of the Vilnius Cathedral. After the death of Mikołaj of Gorzków in 1414, Paweł stayed in Lithuania serving as chaplain to Grand Duke Vytautas and as provost of the Church and hospital of the Holy Spirit in Vilnius. It was due to Vytautas' favour that he presented his candidacy to Pope Martin V in a petition dated 28 November 1427 that Paweł of Bojańczyce was promoted to Bishop in the Diocese of Kamianets-Podilskyi. King Władysław II Jagiełło also expressed his support and approval of Paweł being promoted as bishop (despite Polish–Lithuanian rivalry between King Władysław II Jagiełło and Grand Duke Vytautas over Podolia).

Paweł was consecrated as Bishop of Kamianets-Podilskyi on 5 May 1428 and on 9 July 1428, another petition from Władysław Jagiełło and Vytautas was also approved; they had interceded on behalf of Paweł so that, as Bishop of Kamianets-Podilskyi, he may continue to retain the hospital provostship of the Holy Spirit and the Church in Vilnius, which was intended to compensate for the modest income of the bishop's office.

During his 25 year tenure as bishop, Paweł primarily responsible for keeping Podolia within Poland after the death Vytautas in 1430 and he was to mediate on behalf of Pope Eugene IV in the Lithuanian disputes between Švitrigaila and Grand Duke Sigismund Kęstutaitis in 1434. On 31 December 1435, he took part in the signing of the peace of Brześć Kujawski. Paweł was alongside the local nobility and the episcopate of the Red Ruthenian lands at the general regional assembly in Mościska in May 1441 and afterwards travelled to the court of King Władysław III at Buda.

In 1447 and 1448, Paweł was instructed by Pope Nicholas V to address and mediate disputes from the Archbishops of Lviv Jan and Piotr Odrowąż, the first in 1447 between Jan Odrowąż and a resident of Lviv and the second in 1448 between Piotr Odrowąż and Mikołaj Parawa in the matter of concerned freedom of navigation on the Dniester.

On 6 January 1450, Paweł endowed the local cathedral chapter, which was still in the process of being organised (ultimately, its establishment fell to his successor Mikołaj Łabuński), in favour of which he relinquished the tithes from 35 localities.

Bishop Paweł of Bojańczyce died on 18 March 1453 as noted by Jan Długosz, a contemporary of the event, was buried in the St. Peter and Paul Cathedral in Kamieniec Podolski.

== See also ==
- Bishops of Kamianets-Podilskyi
- Diocese of Kamianets-Podilskyi
