= Piotr Gołąbek =

- Bishop of Kamianets-Podilskyi
- Diocese: Diocese of Kamianets-Podilskyi
- Appointed: 1468
- Predecessor: Mikołaj Łabuński
- Successor: Mikołaj Próchnicki

Personal details
- Died: 1468 Kingdom of Poland

Piotr Gołąbek also known as Mikołaj Leśniowski (died 1469) – was a Catholic Bishop of Kamianets-Podilskyi, canon of Lviv and a notary at the royal chancellery in the Kingdom of Poland.

== Name ==
Many lists of the Bishops of Kamianets-Podilskyi mistakenly call Piotr of Gołąbek, Mikołaj Leśniowski because of an error made by Jan Długosz, and, following his lead, assigned the same name, Mikołaj, to the clergyman appointed to the Diocese in Kamieniec Podolski following the death of the previous bishop Mikołaj of Łabuń as Piotr Gołąbek was killed by bandits in 1468 whilst travelling from Szarzyna to Leżajsk, which occurred before he had received his consecration as Bishop.

== Biography ==
Gryf noble coat of arms, the noble family that Piotr was a part of.

Very little is known about Piotr's uprbinging, only that he was a part of a szlachta family that used the Gryf coat of arms

At the time of his royal appointment to the pastoral office in the Diocese of Kamieniec, Piotr Gołąbek was a member of the presbytery of Lviv and belonged to the local metropolitan chapter. He also had close ties with the royal chancellery in the Kingdom of Poland, amongst whose staff he is listed for the years 1465–1467.

In a letter to Rome dated to 15 July 1468 from Koło in Greater Poland, Piotr Gołąbek was presented as a canditate for bishopric of Kamianets-Podilskyi by King Casimir IV Jagiellon to Pope Paul II. In presenting Piotr Gołąbek's candidacy to Kamianets-Podilskyi, King Casimir IV Jagiellon also requested that, as far as possible,the nominee be exempted from curial fees, since, due to frequent Tatar raids, the Diocese of Kamianets-Podilskyi was very impoverished and meeting its financial obligations due to the worsened economic situation in Podolia as the provence had suffered a severe raid by the Trans-Volga Tatars, who in turn attacked Muscovy and Volhynia in 1469.

It isnt known the exact date of Piotr's after due to being killed by bandits in the Podkarpacie region but it is likely to be the second half of 1468 as on 5 June 1469 the Mikołaj of Próchnik had already received the papal commission for the bishopric of Kamieniec.

== See also ==
- Bishops of Kamianets-Podilskyi
