= Andrzej of Klęka =

- Bishop of Kamianets-Podilskyi
- Diocese: Diocese of Kamianets-Podilskyi
- Installed: 1411
- Term ended: 1413
- Predecessor: Aleksander
- Successor: Zbigniew

Orders
- Consecration: 11 May 1411

Personal details
- Died: 1413
- Denomination: Catholic

Andrzej of Klęka (d.1413) was a Polish Catholic clergyman and Bishop of Kamianets-Podilskyi.

== Biography ==
Very little is known about Andrzej's personal life, what is known is that that he was the son of a certain Jan of Klęka and from a village near Nowe Miasto nad Wartą in the Kalisz Region Andrzej hailed from Greater Poland and had been associated with it at an earlier stage of his life. Among other things, in 1398 he appears as a party to court proceedings in Greater Poland; above all, he was provost of the Collegiate Church of the Blessed Virgin Mary in Kalisz, a position he also held at the time of his elevation to the episcopate. Andrzej is also mentioned in the years 1399 –1400 where he is participating in royal courts, alongside dignitaries from Greater Poland.

Andrzej is then mentioned on 16 December 1410 as the Bishop-elect of Kamianets-Podilskyi, when his representative, Paweł of Czechów, a canon of Poznań, submitted to the Roman Curia an undertaking to pay the curial fees due in respect of that promotion.

Andrzej is then mentioned in a document which is dated 11 May 1411, and was issued in the name of the Antipope John XXIII where Andrzej was consecrated. Andrzej owed his elevation to the support of the royal court and of King Władysław II Jagiełło. The reason that Andrzej was chosen for this role was due to the intensifying Polish-Lithuanian rivalry for influence in these regions like Podolia as Grand Duke Vytautas was considering the creation of a separate metropolitan see in Lithuania, which would also encompass at least some of the Ruthenian dioceses. To this end, he secured the support of, amongst others, the Bishop of Volodymyr, Grzegorz of Buczków.

After the death of the previous Bishop of Kamianets-Podilskyi, effort was made to ensure that the Bishop of Kamianets-Podilskyi would be someone connected to the royal court of Poland, loyal and someone who would not yield to the proposals and pressures of someone who would not yield to the proposals and pressures of Grand Duke Vytautas. Andrzej was such a figure, but the hopes placed in him were never realised because he died very soon afterwards in 1413.

After Andzrej's death the following years the Polish-Lithuanian struggle in the disputed region of Podolia was split for ecclesiastical and political influence.

== See also ==
- Bishops of Kamianets-Podilskyi
