= Jakiv Susha =

Jakiv Susha, O.S.B.M.
- Bishop of Kholm
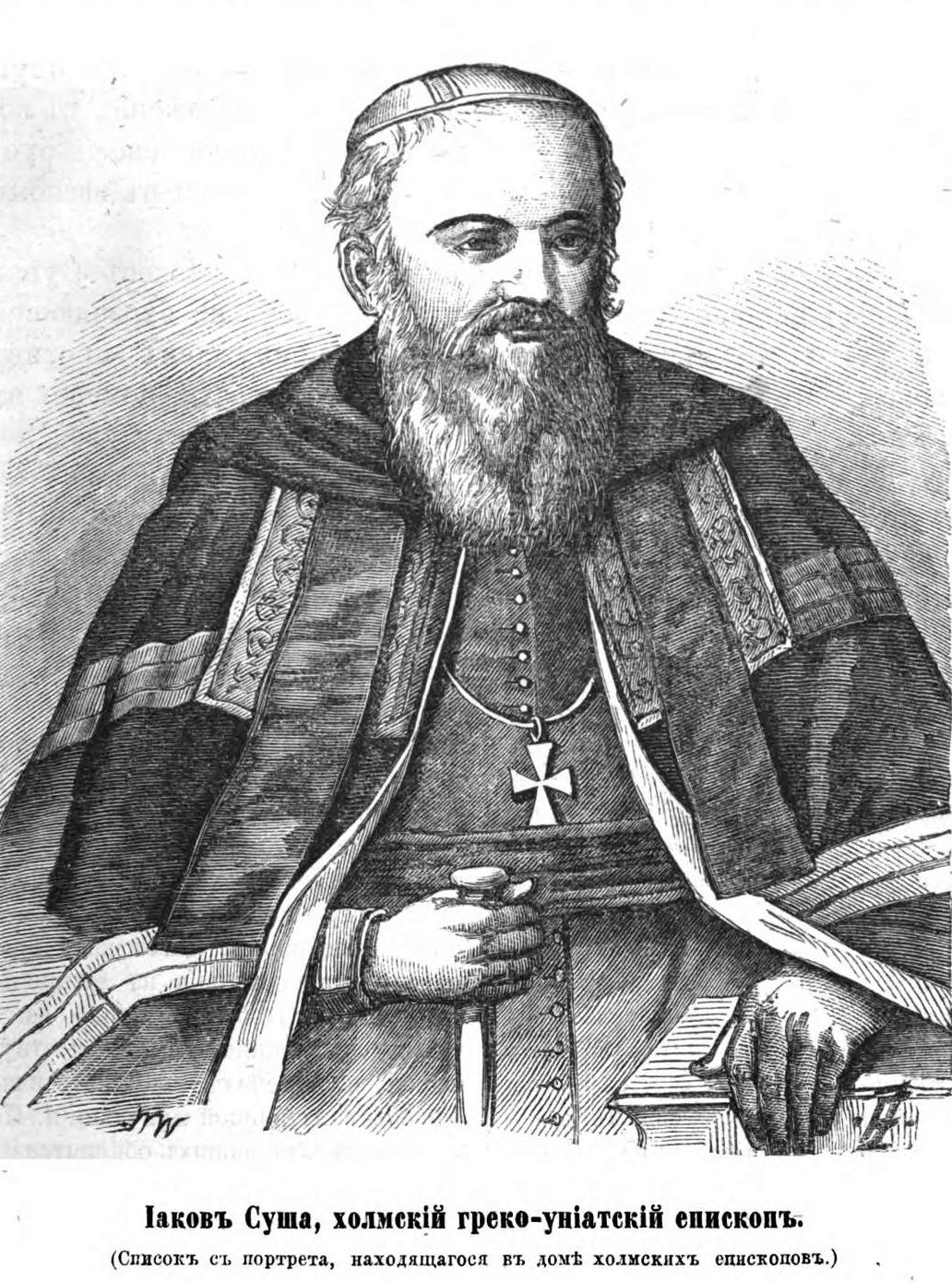
- Church: Ukrainian Greek Catholic Church
- Appointed: 22 February 1652
- Term ended: 4 March 1687
- Predecessor: Metodii Terletskyi
- Successor: Augustyn Lodziata
- Other posts: Administrator of Kholm (1649-1652); Protoarchimandrite of O.S.B.M. (1661–1666)

Orders
- Ordination: 1631 (Priest)
- Consecration: 3 Oct 1652 (Bishop) by Antin Sielava

Personal details
- Born: Ivan Susha; 1610 Minsk, in Belarus
- Died: 4 March 1687 (aged 76–77) Kholm, in Poland

Jakiv Ivan Susha (Belarusian: Якуб Ян Суша, Ukrainian: Яків Іван Суша, Polish: Jakub Jan Susz) - (1610 in Minsk – 4 March 1687 in Kholm) was the Bishop of Chełm–Belz in the Ruthenian Uniate Church from 1652 to 1687. He was also the Protoarchimandrite of the Order of Saint Basil the Great (1661-1666).

== Life ==
He joined the Basilian monastic order in 1626 and then studied in Prussia (1626–1632) and Olomouc, Moravia (1632–1636). After several postings he was brought to Kholm as a lecturer at the gymnasium and assistant to Bishop Metodii Terletskyi. When the bishop died in 1649, he became administrator and then bishop (1652) of the Kholm eparchy.

In the wake of Hetman Bohdan Khmelnytsky’s uprising, Susha proved to be an exceptional diplomat. He negotiated with Cossack leaders, and in 1664–1666 he lived in Rome as delegate of the Uniate church to the papacy. There he persuaded the pope to name a new Uniate metropolitan of Kyiv, healed a serious rift in the Basilian order, and obtained an agreement prohibiting Catholics from changing their rite. He also led the drive to beatify Josaphat Kuntsevych.

== Works ==
Susha's writings included biographies of Kuntsevych and Meletius Smotrytsky. A collection of his extensive correspondence was published in Rome in 1973–1974 in Litterae Episcoporum, vols 2–3.

- Phoenix redivivus albo obraz starożytny chełmski Panny i Matki Przenajświętszej sławą cudownych swoich dzieł ożyły..., Zamość 1646.
- Phoenix iterato redivivus albo obraz chełmski Matki Bożej..., Lwów 1653.
- De laborious Unitorum, promotione, propagatione et protectione divina unionis ab initio eius uque ad haec tempora, 1664)
- Cursus vitae et certamen martyrii B. Josaphat Kuncevicii Archiepiscopi Polocensis..., Romae 1665.
- Saulus et Paulus ruthenae unionis sanguine beati Josaphat transformatus sive Meletius Smotricius..., Romae 1666.
- Phoenix tertiato redivivus albo obraz starożytny chełmski Panny i Matki Przenajświętszej [...] po trzecie ożyły, Zamość 1684. cz. 1; cz. 2.
- Phoenix tertiato redivivus sive imago longe vetustissima Virginis Matris Chelmensis ..., Zamość 1684.

== Notes ==
Catholic Church titles
| Preceded by Venedykt Terletskyi | Protoarchimandrite of the Order of Saint Basil the Great; 1661–1666 | Succeeded by Havryil Kolenda |
| Preceded by Metodii Terletskyi | Bishop of Kholm; 1652–1687 | Succeeded by Augustyn Lodziata |
