= Sędowice, Lublin Voivodeship =

Sędowice
- Village
- Location within Poland
- Coordinates: 51°34′N 21°59′E
- Country: Poland
- Voivodeship: Lublin
- County: Ryki
- Gmina: Ryki

Sędowice [sɛndɔˈvit͡sɛ] is a village in the administrative district of Gmina Ryki, within Ryki County, Lublin Voivodeship, in eastern Poland.
