= Roman Catholic Archdiocese of Halych =

Former Latin Catholic archdiocese in Eastern Europe

The Archdiocese of Halych was the second ecclesiastical province of the Catholic Church in the Kingdom of Poland after the Gniezno province, with a capital in Halych. It was established in 1367, formally proclamided in 1375, and existed until its seat was transferred to Lviv and it was renamed the archdiocese of Lviv metropolis in 1412.

After taking control of the Halych-Volhynian principality, King Casimir the Great began efforts to organize the situation of the Catholic Church in this territory, which was formally subject to the Diocese of Lubusz. At first, in 1349 he sought the creation of a separate metropolis. Later he created bishoprics with the intention of subordinating them to Gniezno. However, after 1366 he finally renewed his efforts to establish a separate metropolis. In 1367 Archbishop Krystyn appeared in Halych, confirmed by the pope. After the king’s death the claims of the bishops of Lubusz were revived. On 13 February 1375 the pope, by the bull Debitum pastoralis officii, erected the metropolis in Halych with suffragans in Przemyśl, Chełm, and Volodymyr. The cathedral became the Church of Saint Mary Magdalene in Halych.

Although Halych was formally the capital, most of the archbishops resided in Lviv, where they established their residence, and where the cathedral had been under construction since 1360. The transfer of the capital was finally carried out by the bull In eminenti specula militantis Ecclesiae of 28 December 1412.

== List of Archbishops ==
- Krystyn (1364 – death 1371)
- Antoni (1371 – 1375)
- Maciej of Eger (1376.01 – death 1380)
- Bernard (1385 – death 1391)
- Jakub Strzemię (1392.10.28 – death 1409.10.20)
- Mikołaj Trąba (1410.06.18 – 1412.04.30), later Metropolitan Archbishop of Gniezno

== See also ==
- List of Catholic dioceses in Ukraine

== Sources and external links ==
- GCatholic - data for all sections
- Krętosz, Józef (2012). "Powstanie w 1412 roku metropolii lwowskiej obrządku łacińskiego oraz jego historyczny i kulturowy kontekst" [The establishment of the Latin-rite metropolis of Lviv in 1412 and its historical and cultural context]. Śląskie Studia Historyczno-Teologiczne. 45 (2): 316–330.
