= Paweł Piasecki =

Roman Catholic bishop (1579–1649)

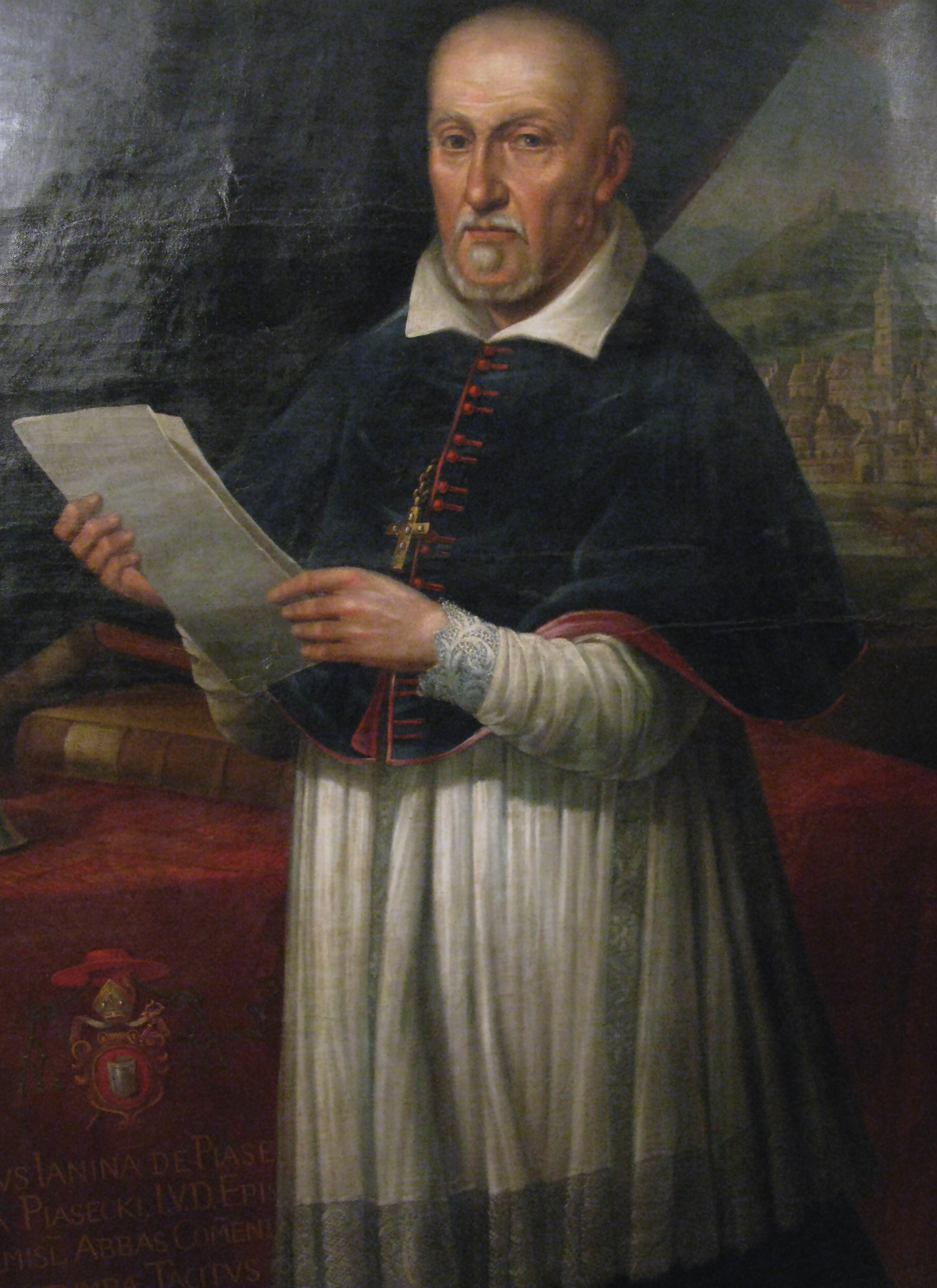

Paweł Piasecki (1579–1649) was the Royal Secretary of king Sigismund III Vasa (1613–1627); Catholic priest, canon, abbot, bishop of Kamieniec (1627–1640), bishop of Chełm (1640–1644), bishop of Przemyśl (1640–1649).

He was the author of a chronicle in Latin, Chronicon gestorum in Europa singularium, later translated into Polish as Kronika Pawła Piaseckiego biskupa przemyślskiego. Polski przekład wedle dawnego rękopismu, poprzedzony studyjum krytyczném nad życiem i pismami autora 1870.
