= Jakub Strzemię =

Polish Roman Catholic archbishop

Blessed Jakub Strzemię Order of Friars Minor
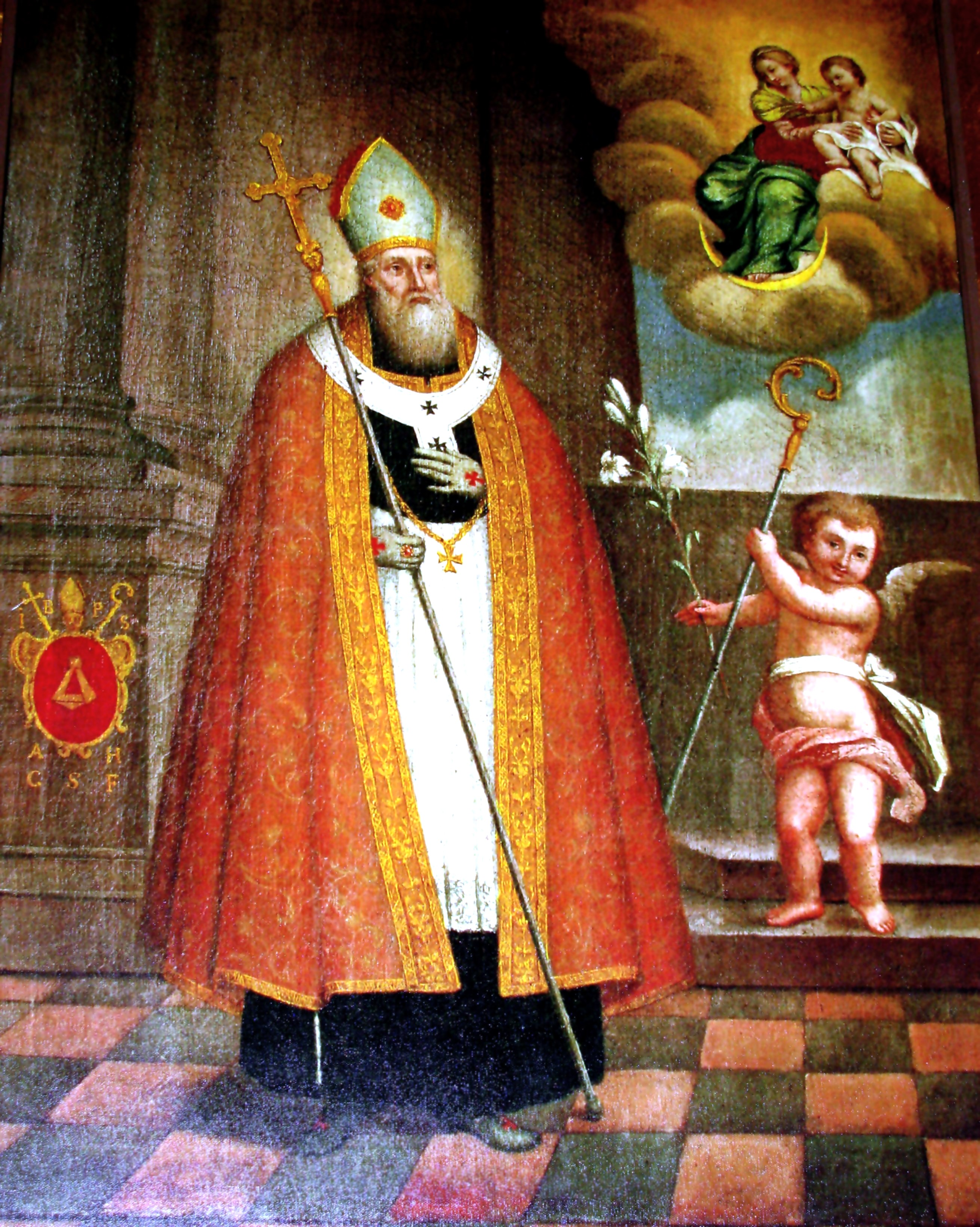
- Painting.

Archbishop
- Born: c. 1340; Galacia, Kingdom of Poland
- Died: 20 October 1409 (aged 69); Lviv, Kingdom of Poland
- Venerated in: Roman Catholic Church
- Beatified: 11 September 1791, Saint Peter's Basilica, Papal States by Pope Pius VI
- Feast: 20 October
- Attributes: Archbishop's attire; Crozier
- Patronage: Archdiocese of Lviv; Diocese of Zamość-Lubaczów; Against headaches

Jakub Strzemię (c. 1340 - 20 October 1409) was a Polish Roman Catholic archbishop and a professed member of the Order of Friars Minor. He served as the Archbishop of Halicz from 1392 until his death when the archdiocese was incorporated into that of the Archdiocese of Lviv.

The spread of his cultus across Poland led to his beatification in 1791.

== Life ==
Jakub Strzemię was born in 1340 to Polish nobles. He fostered a significant devotion to Francis of Assisi which led to him discovering that his religious calling was to join the Order of Friars Minor - this was despite the fact that he once wanted to join the missions to aid the poor.

In 1375 he was made the superior of the Brothers Association of Pilgrims for Christ which was a group of Franciscans and Dominicans that would evangelize across Europe in places such as Moldova. From 1385 until 1388 he was the guardian of the Lviv Franciscan convent. It was on 27 June 1391 that Pope Boniface IX appointed him as the Archbishop of Halicz; he received his episcopal consecration sometime in Tarnów in the first few months of 1392.

In that role he defended the mendicant friars from attacks from the secular wing of the Polish priesthood and government while also defending the rights of the faithful. He was the Vicar-General of the Franciscan missions in western Russia and was also behind the construction of religious houses and schools as well as new churches and additional hospitals in his archdiocese.

He died on 20 October 1409. In 1419 his remains were exhumed and deemed to be incorrupt.

== Beatification ==
He received beatification on 11 September 1791 from Pope Pius VI after the recognition of his widespread cultus (a following with devotion to him) in Poland and the surrounding states.
