= Dominican Church of the Holy Spirit =

Church in Vilnius

Coordinates: 54.6812°N 25.2846°E

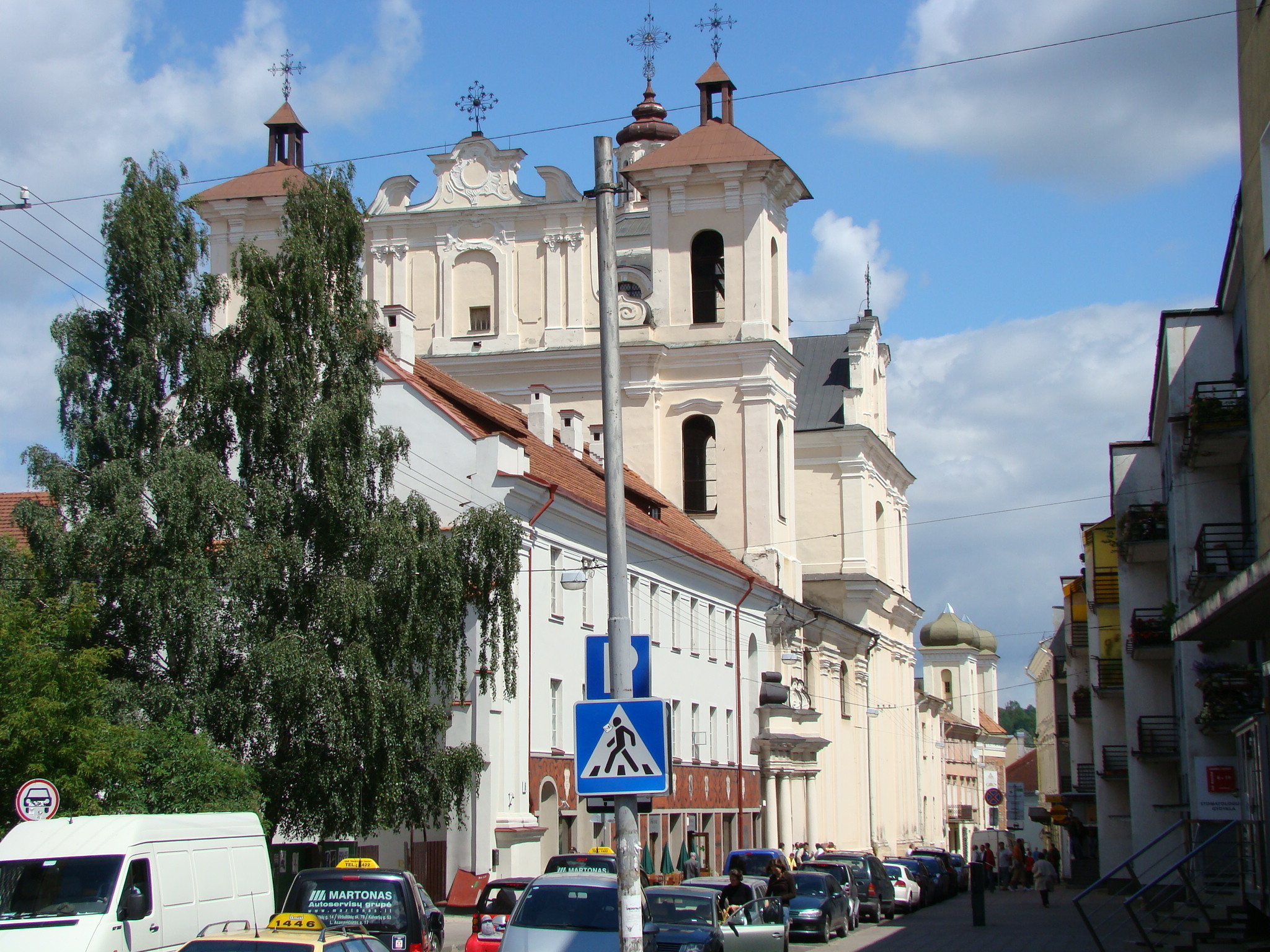
View of the Church of the Holy Spirit from the Dominikonų street

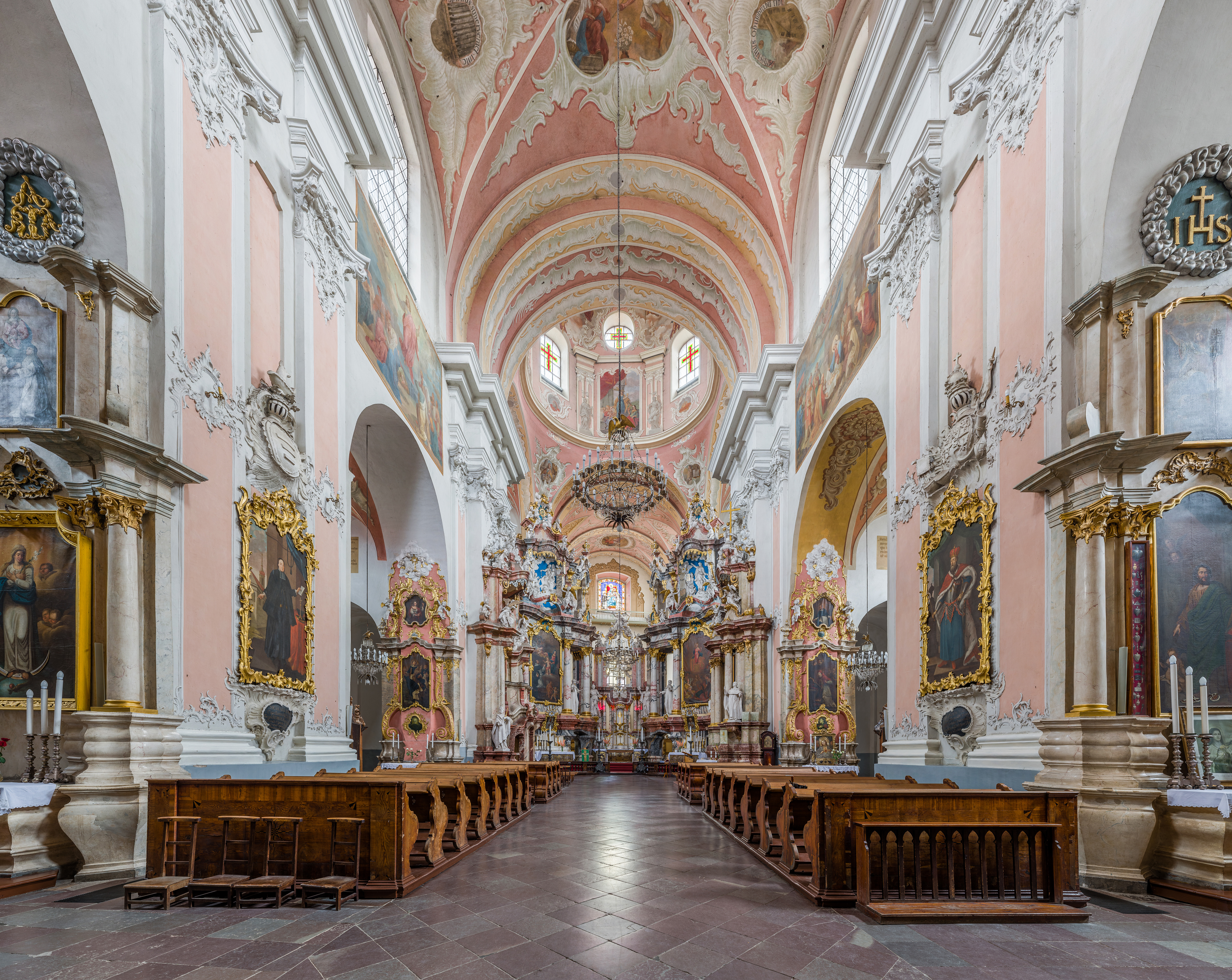
Interior of the Church

Dominican Church of the Holy Spirit, Vilnius (Dominikonų St. 8) is a church in Vilnius, Lithuania, a monument of high and late Baroque. Crowned with a cupola, it stands out in the panorama of the old town and can be seen from surrounding streets.

== History ==
It is thought that a small (probably wooden) church stood here already in Gediminas' times. In ca. 1408 Vytautas built the gothic church of the Holy Spirit that was later expanded. In 1501 King Alexander Jagiellon gave it to the Dominican Monastery, the oldest in Lithuania. The whole complex was destroyed by fire in 1610, rebuilt in the baroque style, but burned down again in 1655. In 1679-88 it was expanded and reconstructed. The walls of the church survived from that period; the interior décor was created in 1749-70, the cupola was reconstructed in 1752-60. In 1844 tsarist authorities closed the monastery down and the church became parochial. After World War II the church became the main church of the Vilnius Polish community.

Neighboring monastery was converted into a prison by the tsarist authorities in 1807. It was a place for imprisonment for many Polish and Lithuanian patriots - the Philarets, participants in the 1831 and 1863 uprisings. Today monastery building remain largely devastated.

== Architecture ==
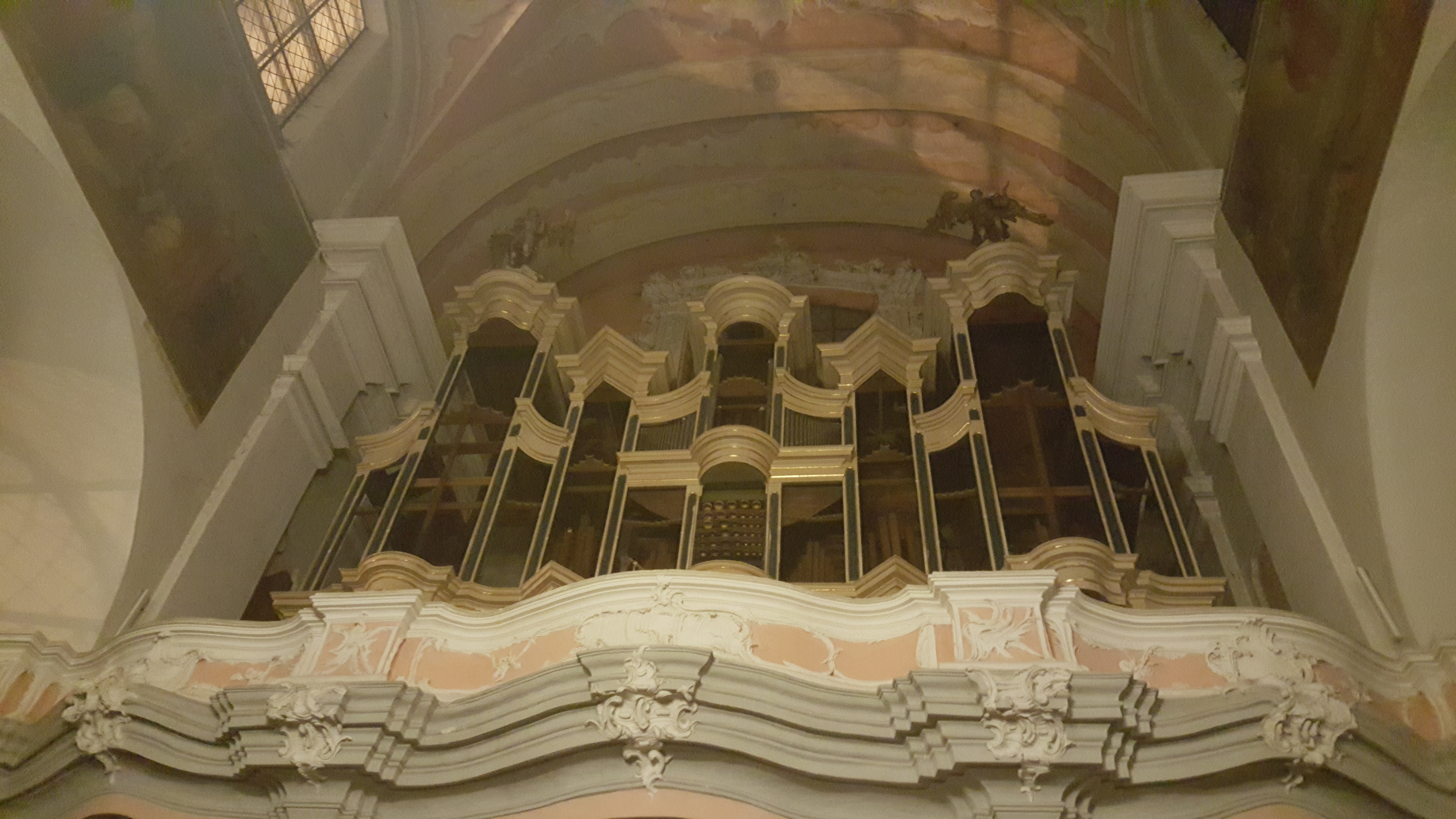
Church organ

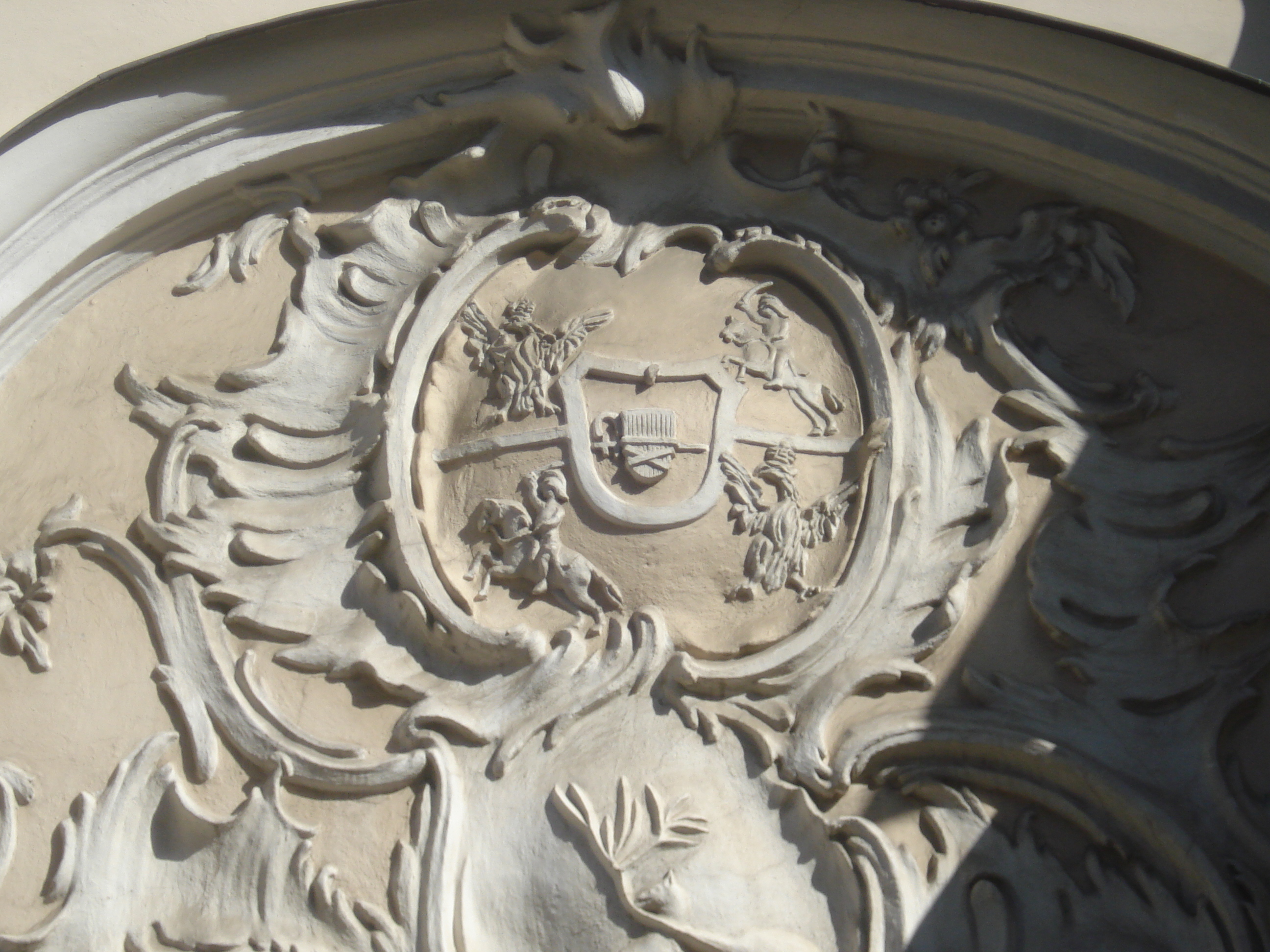
Authentic Coat of arms of the Polish–Lithuanian Commonwealth

The church stands sideways to the street and does not have a clearly designed main façade. Its height with the cupola is 51 m. The bottom part of the façade (with small twin towers) is covered over by monastery buildings. The exterior has features of high and late Baroque. Noted for playful rococo ornamentation, the interior of the church is one of the most valuable in Lithuania. It is heralded by the cartouches of the portal with coats of arms and fresco settings in the monastery-like corridor leading to the church. There are 16 altars in the church. The altars and the pulpit are lavishly decorated with round and relief sculptures and ornamentation. The church also has many Baroque frescoes; a multi-figural composition "Apotheosis of the Holy Spirit" (neo-Baroque, 19th century) in the cupola. 45 paintings in the church (an image of St. Barbara with a 17th- or 18th-century setting, a rococo "St. Catherine of Siena" by Szymon Czechowicz, a portrait of Alexander Jagiellon by an unknown artist of the second half of the 18th century) are considered monuments of art.

== Dungeons ==
An entry under the altar leads to the large vaults, which are labyrinthine, with many rooms and crypts. The dungeons house remains of hundreds of Vilnius residents, some of them naturally mummified, and are surrounded by urban legends. While the existence of the dungeons was known, the first efforts to explore and organize the abandoned dungeons were carried out by students of Vilnius University in the 1930s. The students, however, did not observe proper archaeological procedures and did a lot of damage. Their practices included sorting the bones, such as putting all skulls on shelves and removing grave goods. Since then, the remains were moved many times leaving them in a haphazard and disorganized state. Urban legends claim that these remains are of French soldiers from the 1812 French invasion of Russia or of victims of the Inquisition or plague. More romantic are claims that these dungeons were once part of a larger tunnel network that allowed legendary lovers Barbara Radziwiłł and Sigismund II Augustus to meet in secret.

In 2011, anthropologists from Vilnius University, led by Rimantas Jankauskas, began a study of the mummified bodies. They estimated that the vaults hold remains of about 600 people including many women and children from the mid-18th century to the early 19th century. The team selected the best preserved mummies and performed their tomography. The results show that several people were overweight and had bunions, which led to the conclusion that these were wealthier people.
