= Eparchy of Chełm–Belz (Ruthenian Uniate Church) =

Eparchy of the Ukrainian Greek Catholic Church in Poland

Eparchy of Chełm and Belz Dioecesis Chelmensis et Belthiensis Ruthenorum
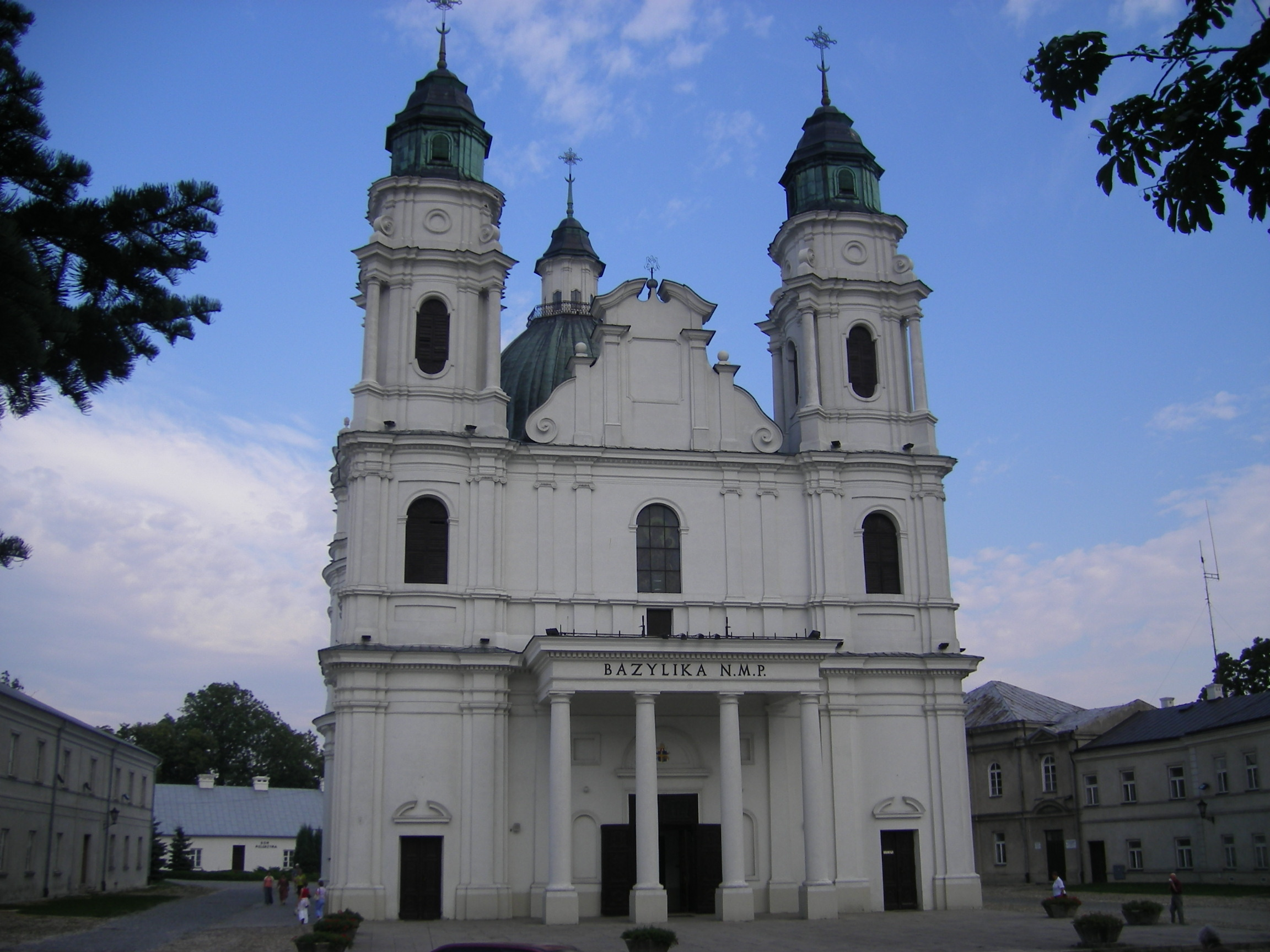
- Former Cathedral of the Nativity of the Mother of God in Chełm

Location
- Headquarters: Chełm, Poland

Information
- Denomination: Catholic Church
- Sui iuris church: Ukrainian Greek Catholic
- Rite: Byzantine Rite
- Dissolved: 1875 (suppressed)
- Cathedral: Cathedral of the Nativity of the Mother of God in Chełm
- Language: Church Slavonic

The Eparchy of Chełm–Bełz (also known as Chełm–Bełz of the Ukrainians, Latin: Dioecesis Chelmensis et Belthiensis Ruthenorum) was an eparchy of the Ruthenian Uniate Church from 1596 until 1875. It was a suffragan of the Metropolis of Kiev, Galicia and all Ruthenia. It was situated in the Polish–Lithuanian Commonwealth. Today, the territory of the eparchy is located in the south-eastern corner of the modern state of Poland and in north-western corner of Ukraine around the province (oblast) of Lviv. The episcopal see of the eparchy was situated in the city of Chełm; today, the cathedral is used by the Latin Church as the Basilica of the Birth of the Virgin Mary. The eparchy was forcibly suppressed in favor of the Russian Orthodox Church by the Russian Empire in May 1875 in the Conversion of Chełm Eparchy.

== History ==
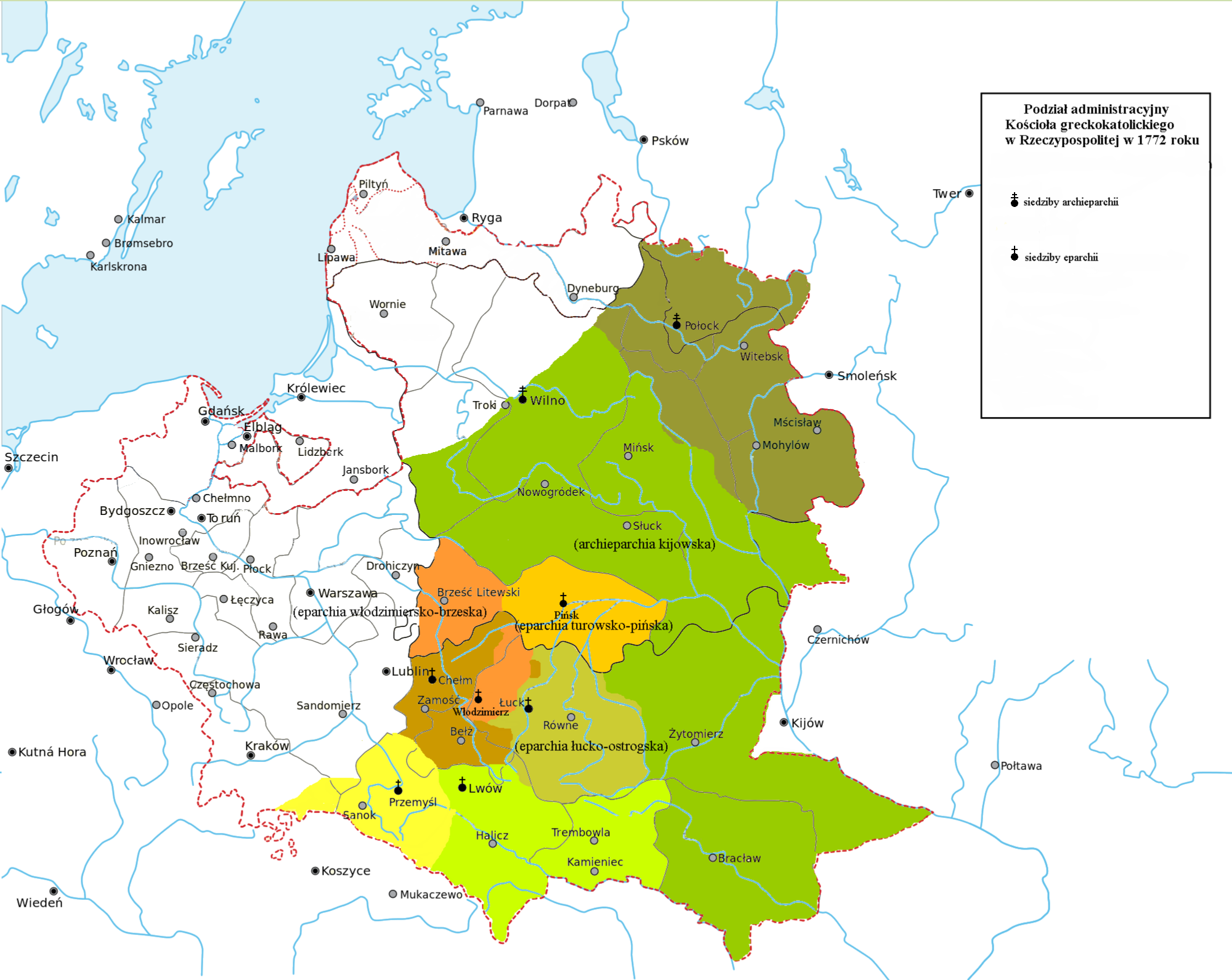
(Arch)eparchies of the Ruthenian Uniate Church in the Polish-Lithuanian Commonwealth in 1772

It was established in 1596 in the Polish-Lithuanian Commonwealth on territory that had not previously been served by the church. It was suppressed by the Russian Empire on 18 March 1875. In Ukraine, a modern successor to the eparchy in the Ukrainian Greek Catholic Church may be considered to be the Eparchy of Sokal–Zhovkva.

== Episcopal ordinaries ==
Suffragan eparchs of Chełm–Bełz

- Dionysius (Zbyruyskyy) (1596 – 1603)
- Arseniusz Joann (1604 – 1619)
- Atanazy Pakosta (1619 – death 1625?)
- Teodor Mieleszko (1625 – 1626)
- Metody Terlecki, Basilian Order of Saint Josaphat (O.S.B.M.) (1630 – death 7 June 1649)
- Atanazy Zachariasz Furs (1649 – death 1649)
- Jakub Jan Susza, O.S.B.M. (1652 – death 4 September 1687)
- Augustyn Aleksander Łodziata (1687 – death 1691?)
- Jan Małachowski (1691 – death 1693)
- Gedeon Woyna-Orański (1693 – 1709)
- Josyf Levyckyj (1711 – death 15 June 1730)
- Felicjan Filip Wołodkowicz (Feliks Filipp Volodkovič), O.S.B.M. (1731 – 12 January 1756)
- Maksymilian Rylo, O.S.B.M. (1758–1784)
- Tadeusz Teodozy Rostocki, O.S.B.M. (2 July 1784 – 4 April 1790)
- Porfiriusz Skarbek-Ważyński (1790 – death 9 March 1804)
- Ferdynand Dąbrowa-Ciechanowski, O.S.B.M. (18 July 1810 – death 7 April 1828)
- Filip Felicjan Szumborski, O.S.B.M. (29 January 1830 – death 19 January 1851)
- Jan Teraszkiewicz (January 1851 – death 1 March 1863)
- Jan Mikołaj Kaliński (16 March 1863 – death 19 October 1866)
- Michał Kuzemśki (22 June 1868 – retired 1871), died 1879

== Sources and external links ==
- GCatholic - data for all sections
