= Mikołaj Dzierzgowski =

Archbishop of Gniezno and the Primate of Poland

His Excellency Mikołaj Dzierzgowski
- Archbishop of Gniezno; Primate of Poland
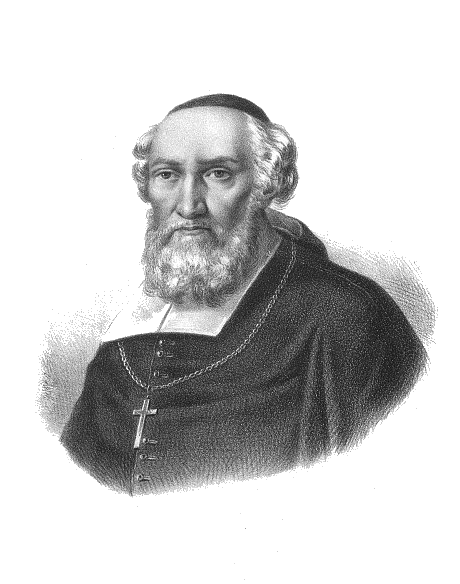
- Church: Roman Catholic
- Archdiocese: Gniezno
- Installed: 1543
- Term ended: 1546

Orders
- Consecration: 20 May 1541

Personal details
- Born: 1490
- Died: 19 January 1559 (aged 68–69) Łowicz
- Coat of arms

Mikołaj (Nicholas) Dzierzgowski (1490–1559) was Archbishop of Gniezno and Primate of Poland. He was born in 1490 into a szlachta family of the Jastrzębiec coat of arms. He was born out of wedlock to Jeżewskiego de Dzierzgów and either Zbigniewy Wilkanowskiej or Catherine Wilkanowskiej.

After studying in 1518AD at the Academy of Cracow, he became a royal notary where he became the protégé of Andrzej Krzycki, Bishop of Płock. In 1528, he continued his studies at the University of Padua and in 1541 became bishop of Chełm followed by bishop of Kujawy in 1543. In 1545, he became the Archbishop of Gniezno.

Like his predecessor Jan Laski, he was a leader of the national anti-Habsburg party. A conservative, he actively opposed Jews (especially in Sochaczew) and Protestants (issuing an edict against them on 13 January 1557), and what he a saw as the rampant apostasy in Poland. He once threatened a conference held by Sigismund II Augustus. He called a Synod in Łowicz in 1556AD and a conference of bishops in Warsaw. On 7 December 1550, in Wawel Cathedral, he crowned Queen Barbara Radziwiłł and on 30 July 1555, performed her wedding there. He also crowned Catherine of Habsburg, Sigismund's second wife. Under his influence, Sigismund Augustus issued on 13 January 1557, an edict against religious innovators, against Protestants. He died on 18 January 1559.
