= Piotr Myszkowski (bishop) =

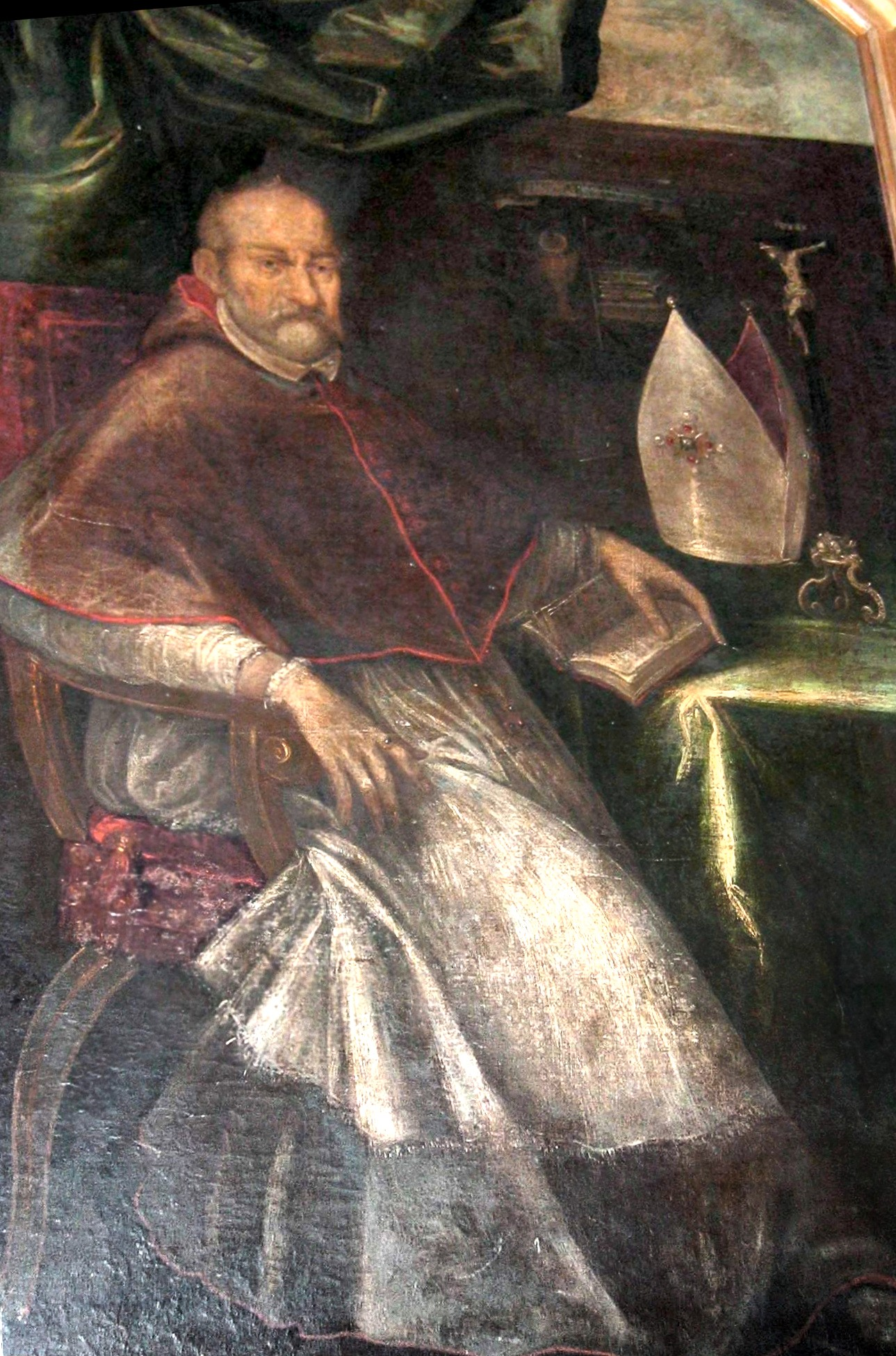
bp Piotr Myszkowski

Piotr Myszkowski (c. 1510 – 1591) was a 16th-century Roman Catholic Bishop of Plock and Kraków, in Poland.

== Early life ==
Piotr Myszkowski was born about 1510 at Przeciszów into the Jastrzębiec noble family and studied at the Academy of Kraków from 1527. He took further studies in Padua in 1535 and Rome around 1542.

== Church career ==
He was Bishop of Plock in the years 1567–1577, when he transferred to the bishopric of Cracow on 5 July 1577 year. Here he was Vice-Chancellor of the Crown and Secretary of the Crown in 1559 and the dean of Kraków Cathedral in 1560. He was appointed a canon of Kraków and Gniezno.

And as Bishop of Kraków, convened a diocesan synod and expanded the palaces of the Bishops of Kraków in Kielce and Bodzentyn. He also supported the Jesuits and the Dominicans.

== Government career ==
He was a royal secretary and He was a signatory of the Act of Union of Lublin 1569. In 1575 he signed the election of the emperor Maximilian II of Habsburg.

He died 5 April 1591 in Kraków and was buried in the chapel of St. Dominika przy kościele church, in the family vaults.

Religious titles
Preceded by Andrzej Noskowski	Archbishop of Gniezno; 1567–1577	Succeeded by Piotr Dunin Wolski
