= List of bishops of Płock =

List of the bishops of Płock.

== Płock bishops and suffragan bishops ==
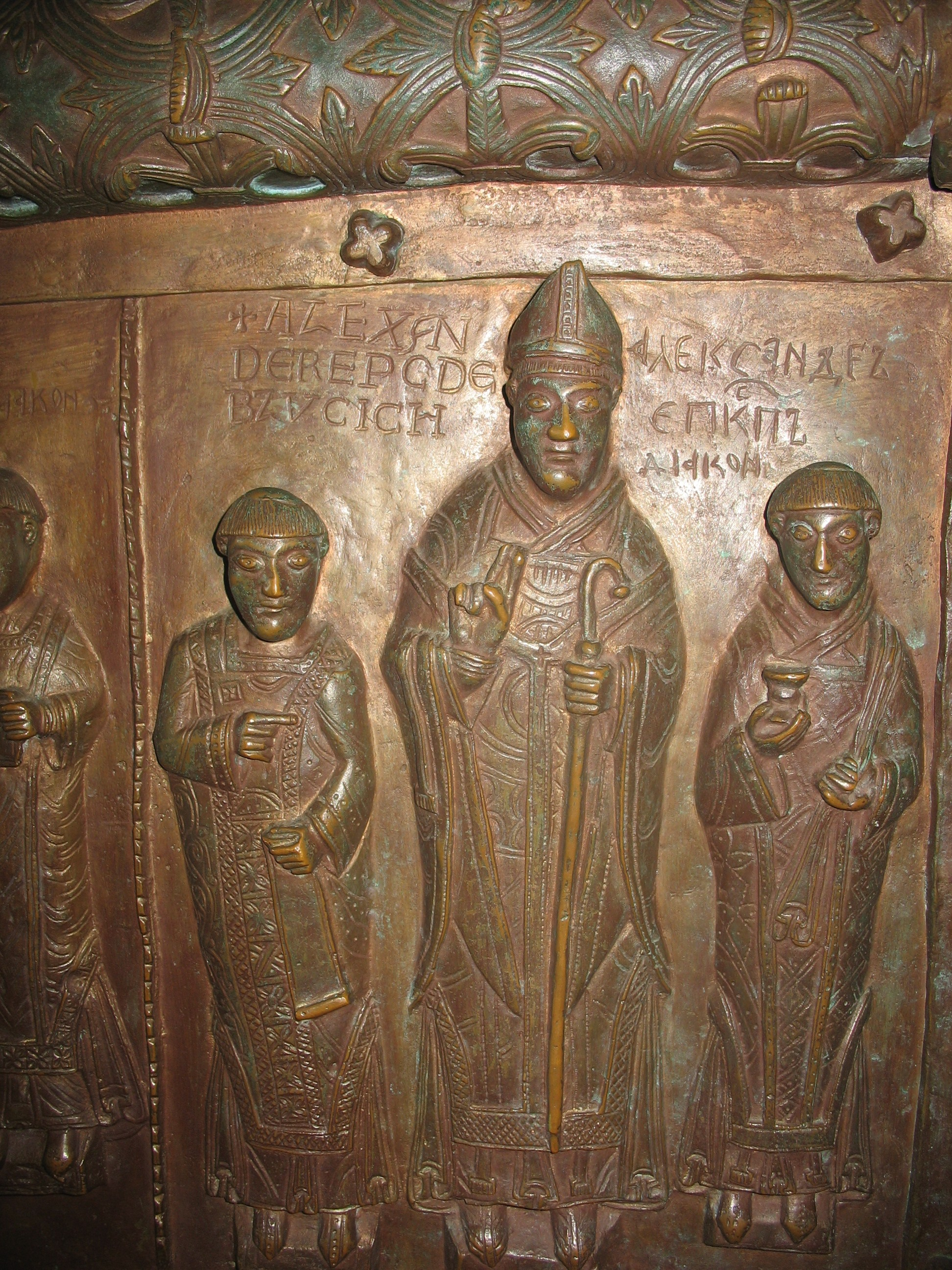
bp Aleksander z Malonne

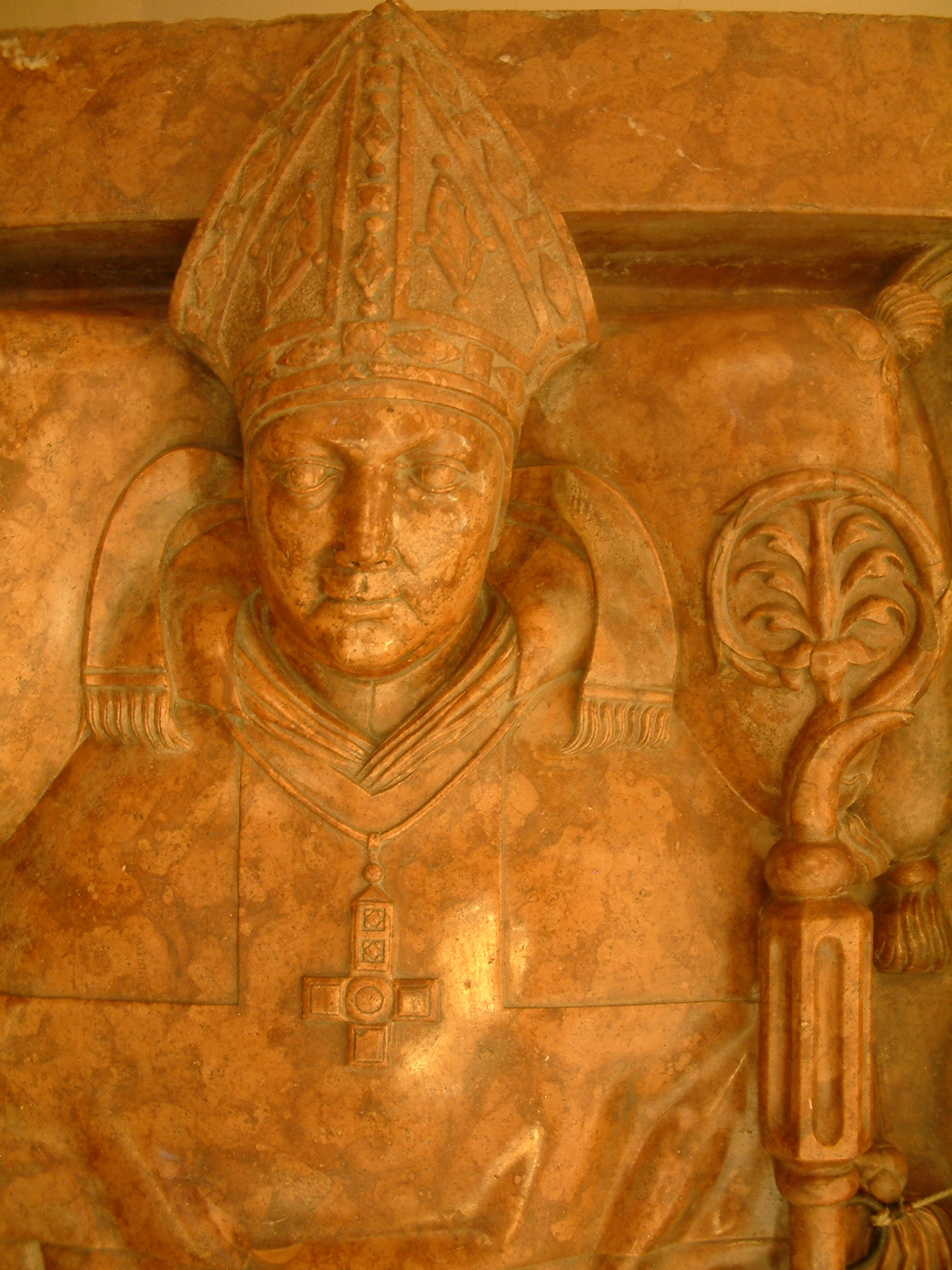
bp Jan Lubrański

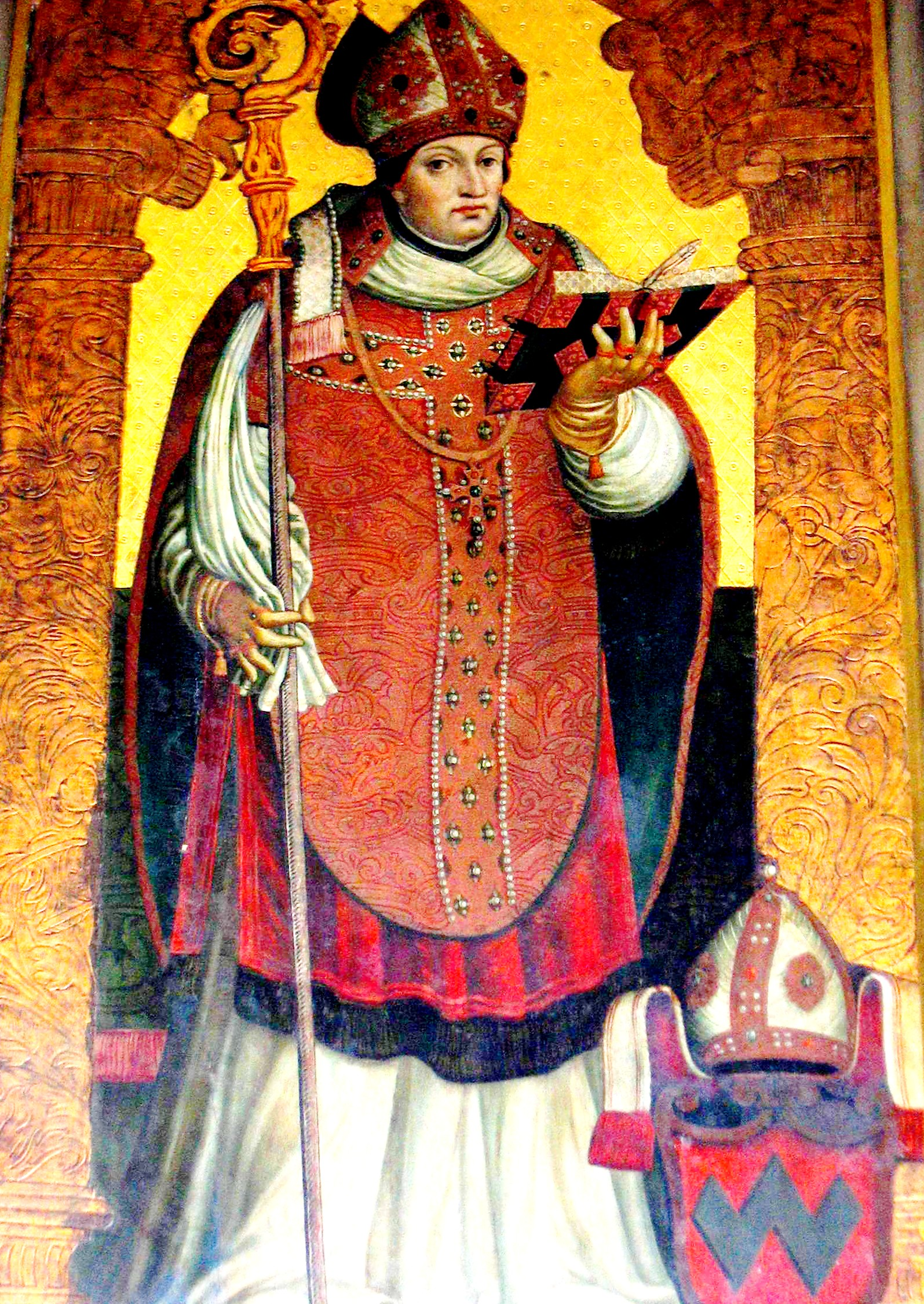
bp Jan Chojeński

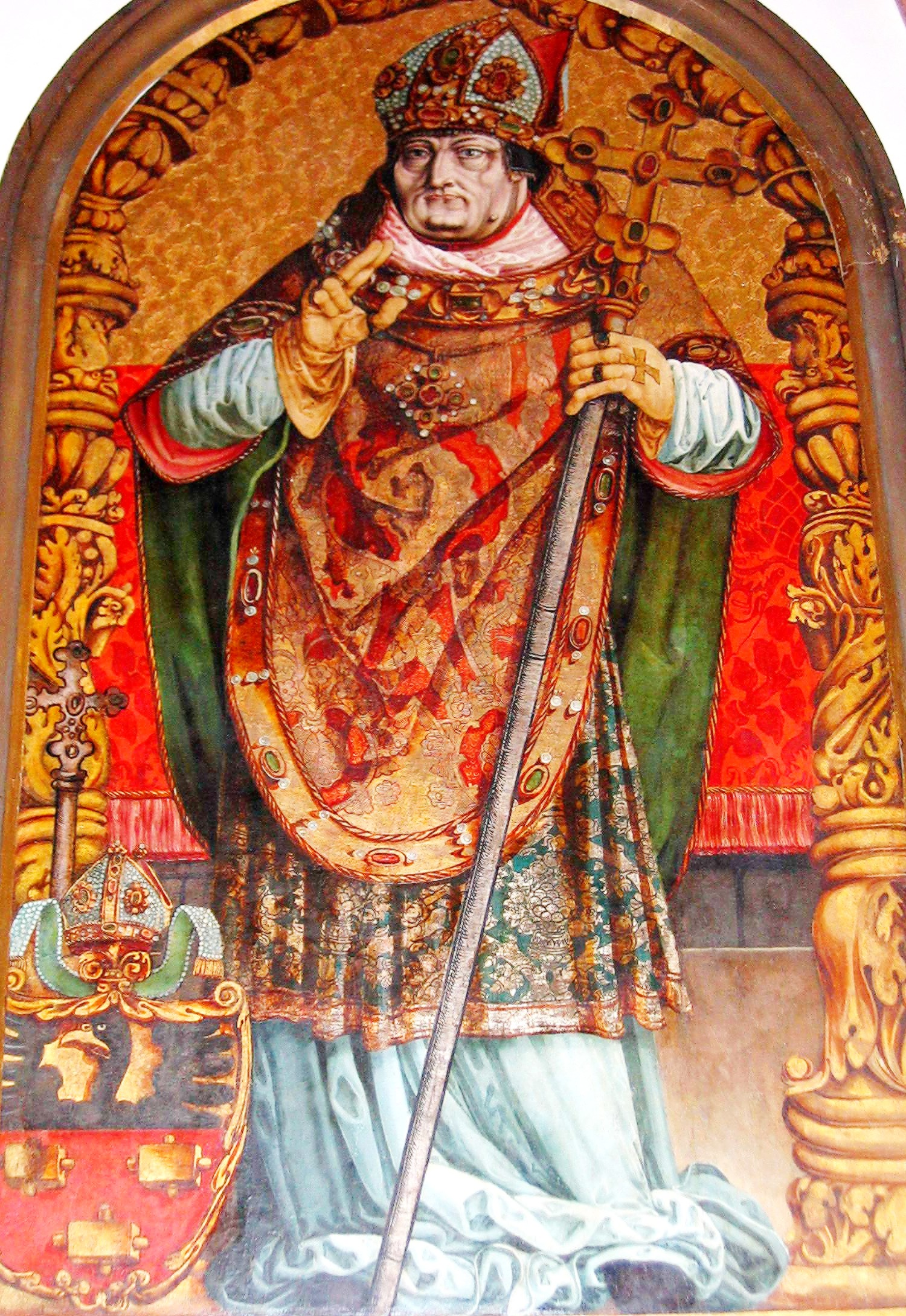
bp Piotr Gamrat

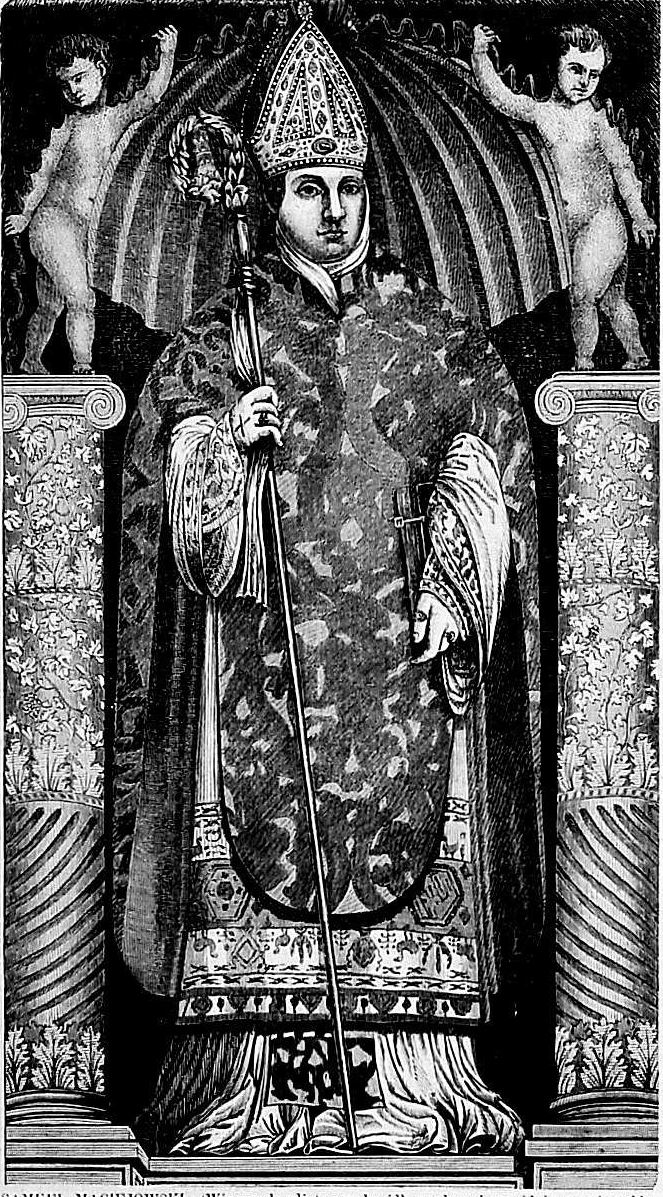
bp Samuel Maciejowski

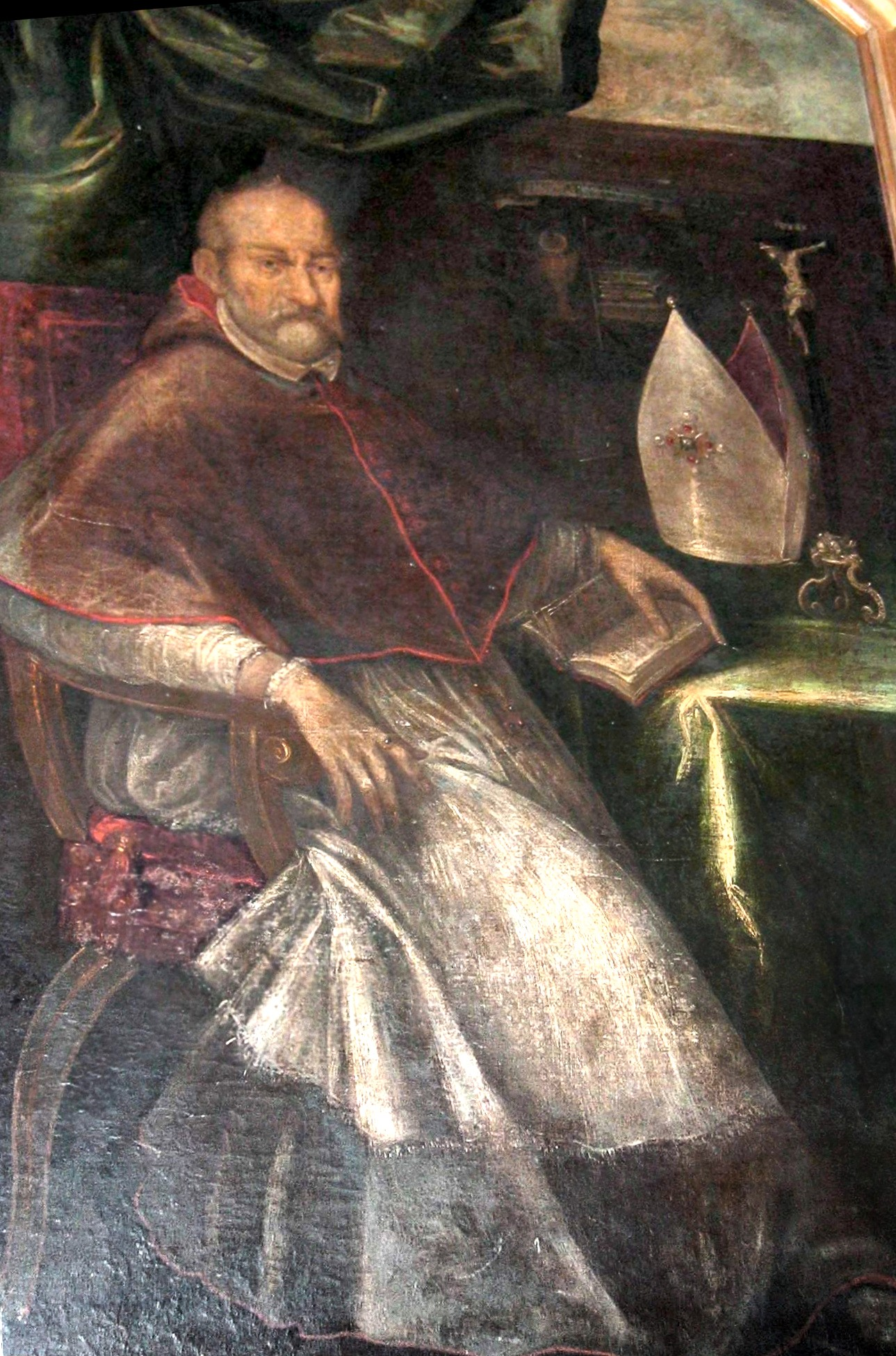
bp Piotr Myszkowski

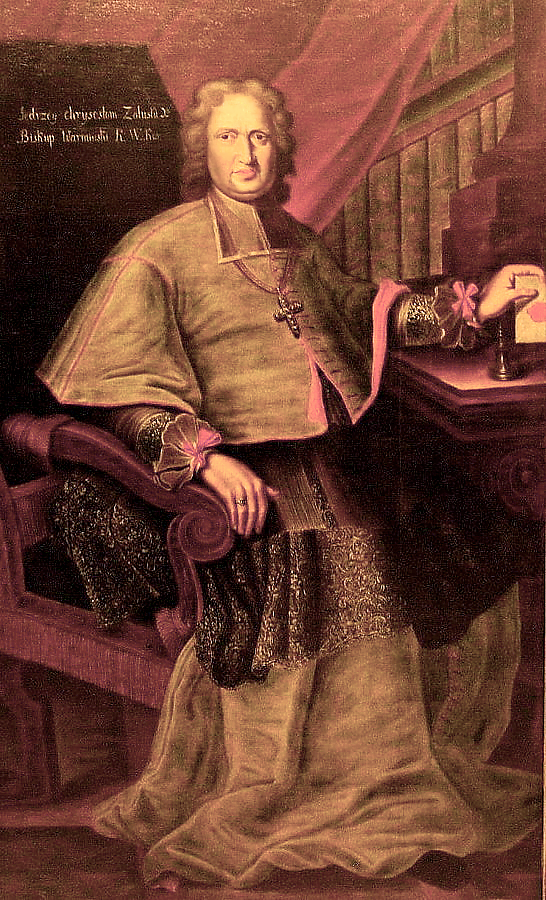
bp Andrzej Chryzostom Załuski

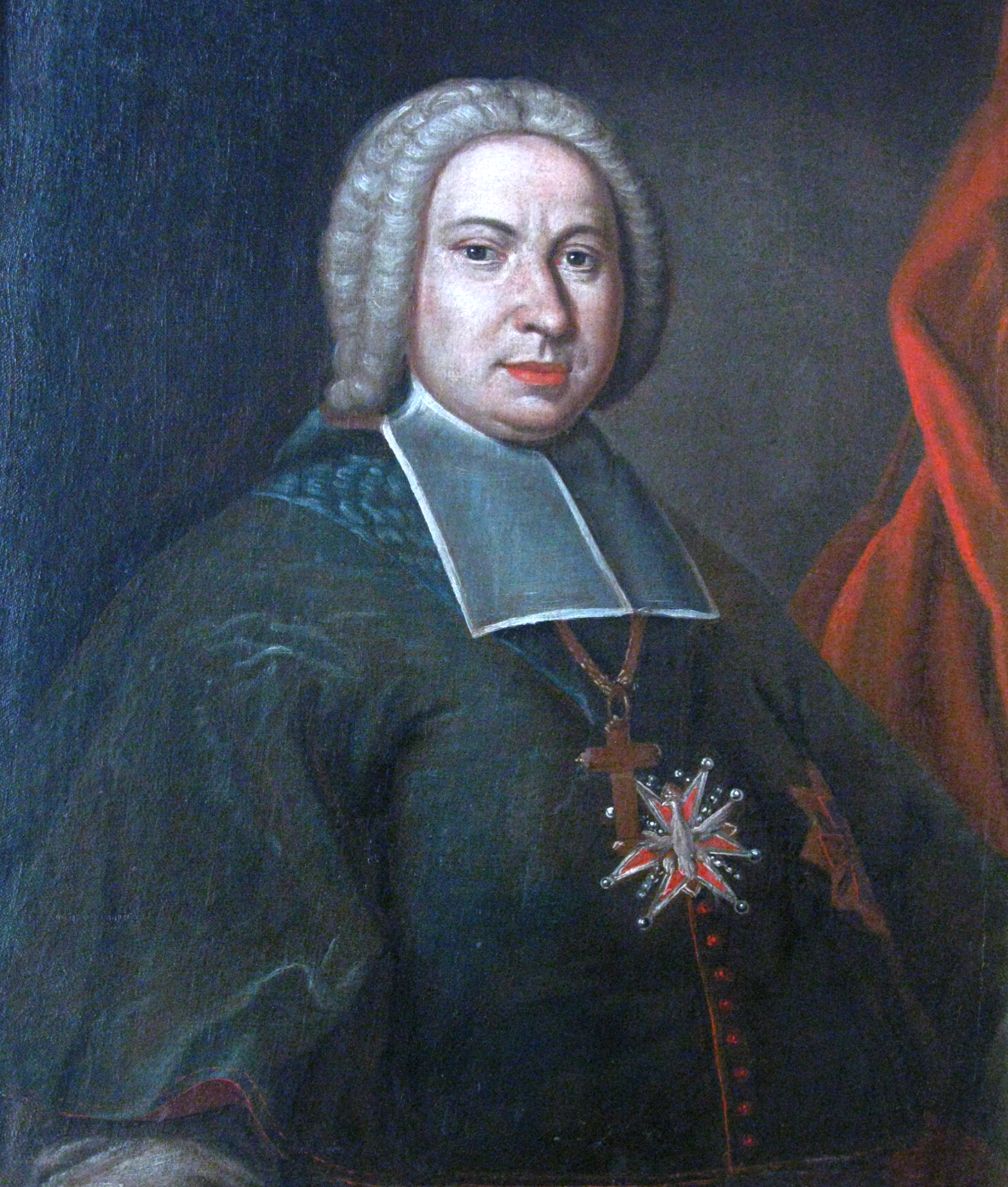
bp Andrzej Stanisław Załuski

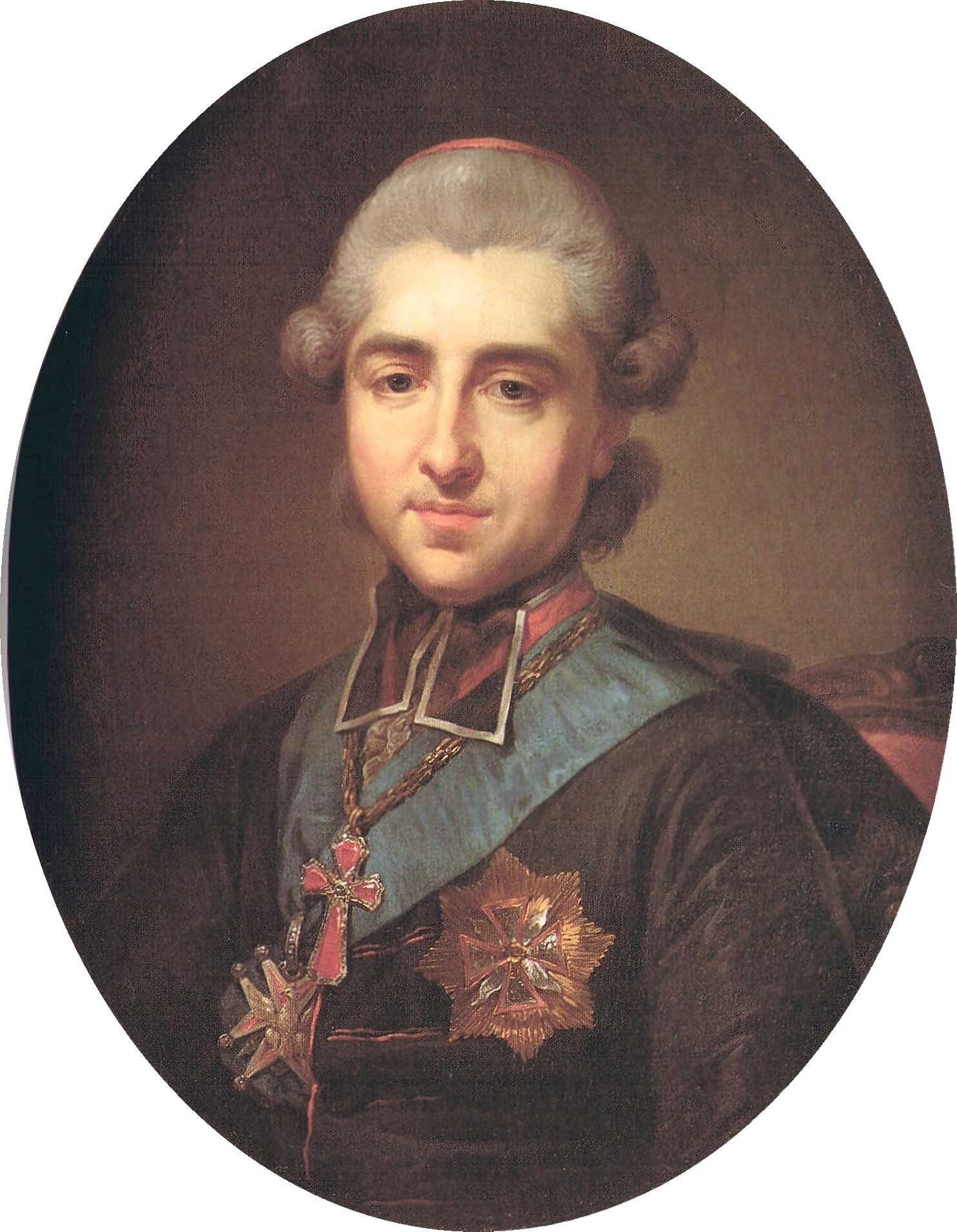
bp Michał Jerzy Poniatowski

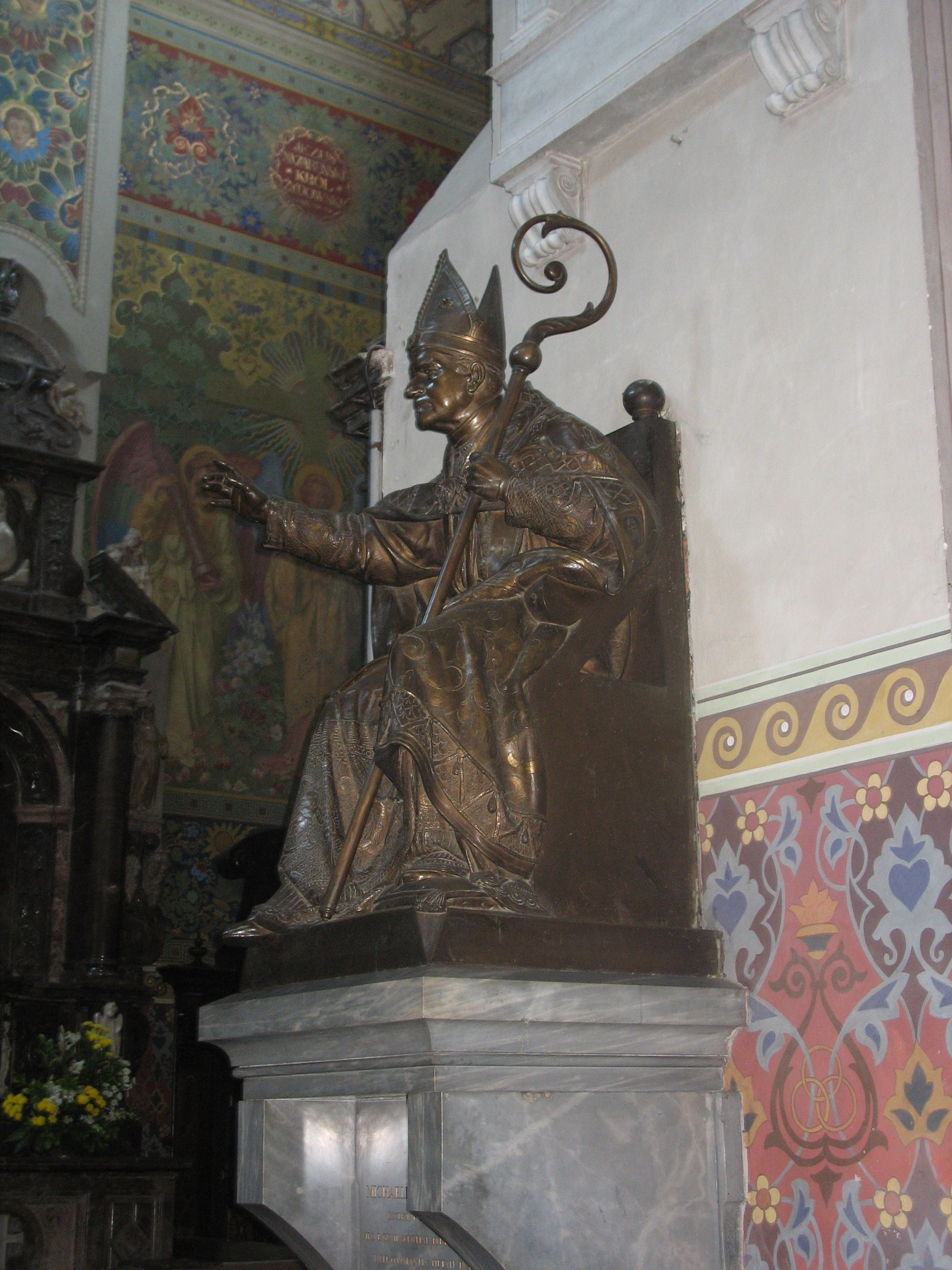
bp Michał Nowodworski

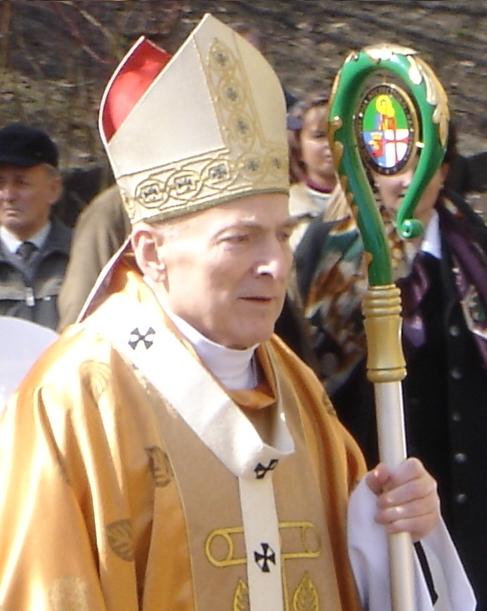
bp Zygmunt Kamiński

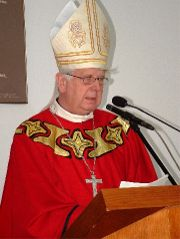
bp Stanislaw Wielgus

Bishops of Płock
Diocesan bishops - time of service in Płock diocese
| Bishop | Time of service | Notes |
|---|---|---|
| Marek | 1075-1088 | First historical bishop of Płock diocese |
| Stefan | 1088-1099/1102 | |
| Filip | 1099/1102-1107/1112 | |
| Szymon h. Gozdawa | 1107/1112-1129 | |
| Aleksander of Malonne | 1129-1156 | Fundator of Cathedral in Płock |
| Werner | 1156-1170/1172 | |
| Lupus h. Godzięba | 1170/1172-1186 | |
| Wit z Chotela | 1187-1206 | |
| Gedko Sasinowic | 1207-1223 | |
| Jan Gozdawita | 1223-1227 | |
| Gunter Prus | 1227-1232 | |
| Piotr I Półkozic | 1227-1239 | |
| Andrzej Gryfita | 1239-1244 | |
| Piotr Brevis | 1245-1254 | |
| Andrzej Ciołek | 1254-1260 | |
| Piotr Niedlich | 1261-1270 | |
| Tomasz Tomka | 1271-1294 | |
| Gedko | 1294-1296 | |
| Jan Wysoki h. Prawdzic | 1297-1310 | |
| Jan h. Nałęcz | 1310-1317 | |
| Florian Laskary of Kościelec | 1317-1333 | |
| Klemens Pierzchała | 1333-1357 | |
| Bernard | 1357-1363 | |
| Janisław Wroński | 1363-1365 | |
| Mikołaj Sówka z Gulczewa | 1365-1367 | |
| Stanisław Sówka z Gulczewa | 1367-1375 | |
| Dobiesław Sówka z Gulczewa | 1375-1381 | |
| Ścibor z Radzymina | 1381-1390 | |
| Henryk Mazowiecki | 1390-1393 | |
| Maffiolus de Lampugnano | 1393-1396 | |
| Jakub z Korzkwi | 1396-1425 | |
| Stanisław z Pawłowic | 1425-1439 | |
| Paweł Giżycki | 1439-1463 | |
| Ścibor z Gościeńczyc | 1463-1471 | |
| Kazimierz III Płocki | 1471-1480 | |
| Piotr z Chodkowa | 1480-1497 | |
| Jan Lubrański | 1498 | |
| Wincenty Przerębski | 1498-1504 | |
| Erazm Ciołek | 1504-1522 | |
| Rafał Leszczyński | 1523-1527 | |
| Andrzej Krzycki | 1527-1535 | |
| Jan Chojeński | 1535-1537 | |
| Piotr Gamrat | 1537-1538 | |
| Jakub Buczacki | 1538-1541 | |
| Samuel Maciejowski | 1541-1546 | |
| Jan Bieliński | 1546 | |
| Andrzej Noskowski | 1546-1567 | |
| Piotr Myszkowski | 1567-1577 | |
| Piotr Dunin Wolski | 1557-1590 | |
| Wojciech Baranowski | 1591-1606 | |
| Marcin Szyszkowski | 1606-1616 | |
| Henryk Firlej | 1618-1624 | |
| Jan Kuczborski | 1624 | nominated, died before taking office |
| Hieronim Cielecki | 1624-1627 | |
| Stanisław Łubieński | 1627-1640 | |
| Prince Charles Ferdinand Vasa | 1640-1655 | |
| Jan Gembicki | 1655-1674 | |
| Bonawentura Madaliński | 1674-1681 | |
| Stanisław Dąmbski | 1682-1692 | |
| Andrzej Chryzostom Załuski | 1692-1699 | |
| Ludwik Bartłomiej Załuski | 1699-1721 | |
| Andrzej Stanisław Kostka Załuski | 1723-1736 | |
| Antoni Sebastian Dembowski | 1737-1752 | |
| Józef Eustachy Szembek | 1753-1758 | |
| Hieronim Antoni Szeptycki | 1759-1773 | |
| Michał Jerzy książę Poniatowski | 1773-1784 | |
| Krzysztof Hilary Szembek | 1785-1797 | |
| Onufry Kajetan Szembek | 1797-1809 | |
| Tomasz Ostaszewski | 1809-1817 | |
| Adam Michał Prażmowski | 1817-1836 | |
| Franciszek Pawłowski | 1836-1852 | |
| Wincenty Teofil Popiel | 1863-1875 | |
| Kacper Borowski | 1883-1885 | |
| Michał Nowodworski | 1889-1896 | |
| Jerzy Józef Szembek | 1901-1903 | |
| Apolinary Wnukowski | 1904-1908 | |
| Antoni Julian Nowowiejski | 1908-1941 | archbishop, beatified |
| Stanisław Figielski | 1940-1946 | administrator of diocese |
| Tadeusz Paweł Zakrzewski | 1946-1961 | |
| Jan Wosiński | 1961-1964 | |
| Bogdan Marian Sikorski | 1964-1988 | |
| Zygmunt Kamiński | 1988-1999 | |
| Roman Marcinkowski | 1999 | administrator of diocese |
| Stanisław Wielgus | 1999-2007 | appointed bishop on 24 May 1999 |
| Roman Marcinkowski | 2007 | administrator of diocese |
| Piotr Libera | from 2007 | appointed bishop 2 May 2007 |
Suffragan bishops - time of service in Płock diocese
| Bishop | Time of service | Notes |
| Filip | 1383 | |
| Jakub | 1408 | |
| Marian | 1410 | |
| Piotr | 1413 | |
| Marek | 1427 | |
| Mikołaj | 1463-1474 | |
| Jakub | 1474-1490 | |
| Jakub | 1490-1496 | |
| Michał z Raciąża | 1496-1513 | |
| Piotr Lubart | 1514-1530 | |
| Mikołaj Broliński | 1532-1546 | |
| Jakub Bieliński | 1546-1583 | |
| Stanisław Brzozowski | 1585-1596 | |
| Jan Zamojski | 1595-1604 | |
| Stanisław Starczewski | 1614-1643 | |
| Wojciech Tolibowski | 1643-1655 | |
| Zygmunt Czyżewski | 1655-1664 | |
| Stanisław Całowański | 1664-1690 | |
| Ludwik Tolibowski | 1691-1698 | |
| Marcin Załuski | 1696-1709 | |
| Paweł Antoni Załuski | 1709-1719 | |
| Marcin Załuski | 1732-1765 | |
| Kazimierz Rokitnicki | 1764-1779 | |
| Michał Żurawski | 1779-1782 | |
| Józef Wojciech Gadomski | 1782-1791 | |
| Michał Maurycy Mdzewski | 1791-1814 | |
| Konstanty Wincenty Plejewski | 1832-1838 | |
| Antoni Melchior Fijałkowski | 1842-1856 | |
| Aleksander Kazimierz Gintowt-Dziewałtowski | 1872-1883 | |
| Henryk Piotr Dołęga Kossowski | 1884-1889 | |
| Adolf Szelążek | 1918-1925 | |
| Leon Wetmański | 1928-1941 | beatified in 1999 |
| Piotr Dudziec | 1950-1970 | |
| Jan Wosiński | 1961-1991 | |
| Roman Marcinkowski | since 1985 | |
| Andrzej Suski | 1986-1992 | retired in November 2017 |
