= Marcin Załuski =

Polish bishop (1700–1768)

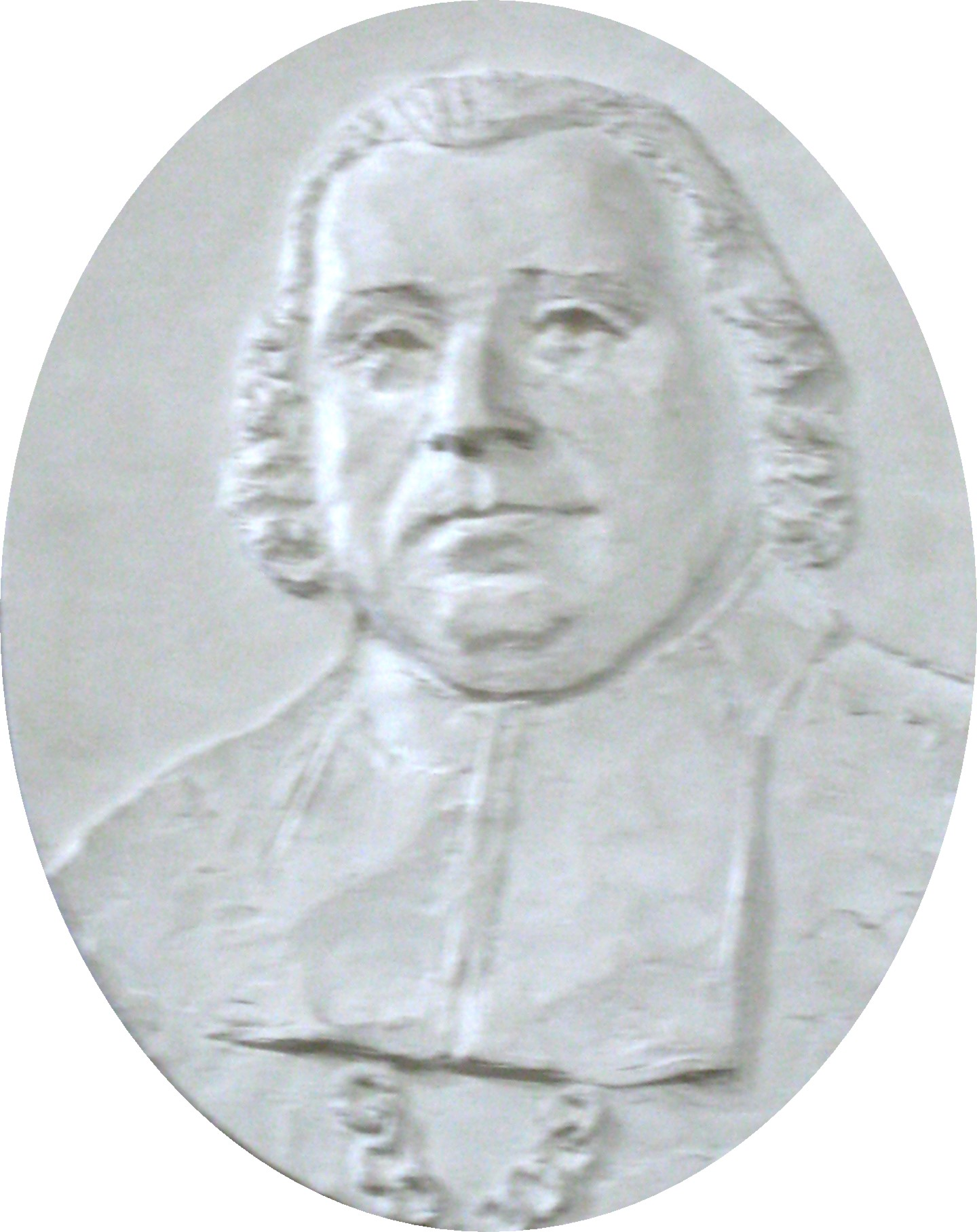
Marcin Załuski

Marcin Załuski (1700–1765) was an 18th-century Roman Catholic Bishop of Płock and statesman, in Poland.

== Early life ==
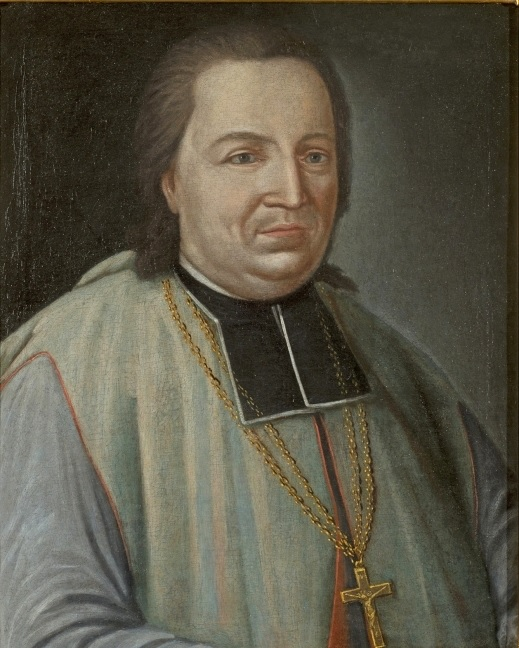
Marcin Załuski

Marcin Zaluski was born November 15 or 30 April 1700 in Jedlance. He was born into the Junosza noble family, the son of Alexander Joseph Zaluski and his wife Teresa Podkańskich.

His education began in Jesuit colleges in Kalisz and Braniewo. He studied in Płock with the help of his uncle Louis Bartholomew Zaluski, and in Slutsk (1717–1718). He also went to the University of Vilnius (1718–1721) followed by Rome (1722–1723), where he studied theology and in Florence, where he earned a law degree.

== Episcopal career ==
In 1715, he joined the Jesuits, took his first vows in 1717, but in 1723 he left the Jesuit order, probably under the influence of the family, who preferred that received the higher ecclesiastical dignity. From 1725 he was dean of the chapter of Płock, and in 1729 a canon of Cracow on the 7 May 1732. This was due manly to support of his brother Andrzej Stanislaw Zaluski, then Bishop of Płock.

On 13 Aug 1696 he was appointed Auxiliary Bishop of Płock, by his close relative Ludwik Bartłomiej Załuski. He was also appointed Titular Bishop of Rosmen. He was also an abbot and Secretary of the Crown. In 1765 retired from his ecclesiastical posting, and returned to the Jesuits and resided in Kobylka.
