= Ritterswerder =

Teutonic castle

- Lampėdžiai, Kaunas, Lithuania

Location
- Coordinates: 54°54′37″N 23°48′56″E

Site history
- Built: Fall 1391
- Built by: Teutonic Order
- Materials: Wood, earthworks
- Fate: Burned down in 1392
- Events: Lithuanian Civil War (1389–92)

Ritterswerder (German for "knight's ait") was a short-lived wooden castle built by the Teutonic Order in fall 1391. It was located on an island in the Nemunas River near Lampėdžiai, now part of the city of Kaunas.

The Order built the castle after they failed to capture Vilnius, capital of the Grand Duchy of Lithuania, in a five-week siege in September–October 1390. It became the headquarters of Vytautas, future Grand Duke of Lithuania, while he fought in the Lithuanian Civil War (1389–92) against his cousin Jogaila, King of Poland. In spring 1392, Henry of Masovia, Bishop of Płock, arrived to the castle to secretly negotiate an agreement between Vytautas and Jogaila. Here, about three weeks later, Henry married Rimgailė, Vytautas' sister, prompting many rumors and speculations. When the cousins reconciled, Vytautas turned against the Teutonic Order and burned Ritterswerder and two other Teutonic castles on the Neman River before returning to Vilnius.

During a campaign in 1394, the Order attempted to rebuild the castle but did not complete it as they were attacked by the Lithuanians. The Order decided to abandon the construction and besiege Vilnius for the second time. When in 1404, Vytautas confirmed the Peace of Raciąż in Kaunas, the Grand Master issued several documents from the island but did not mention the castle.

The island has since disappeared as the river changed its course during the ages. It is believed that the island is now a hill on the right bank of the Neman River in Lampėdžiai.
