= Michał Nowodworski =

Polish Roman Catholic bishop

Michał Nowodworski (1831–1896) was a 19th-century Roman Catholic bishop of Płock in Poland.

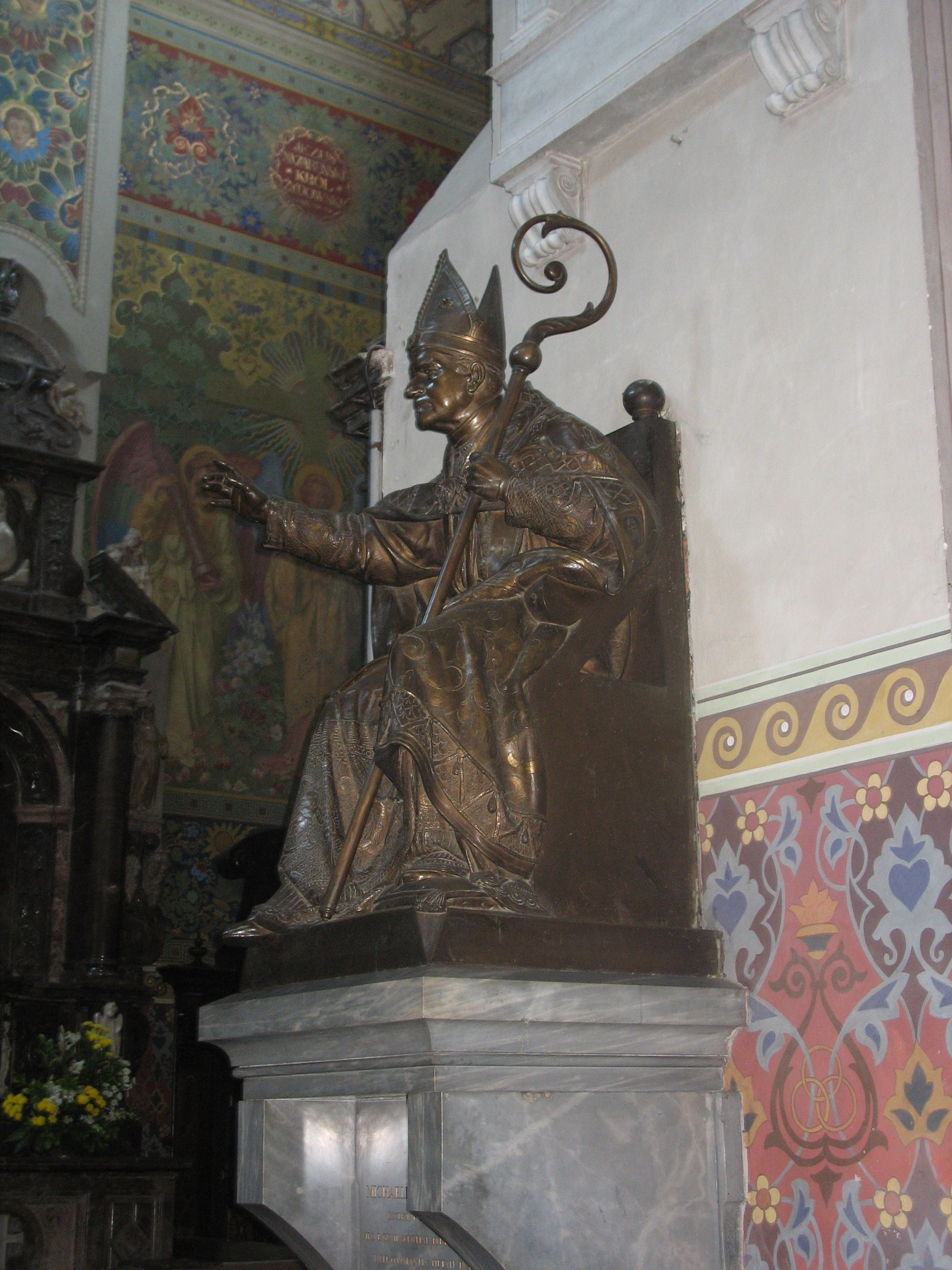
bp Michał Nowodworski

Michael Nowodworski was born on 27 July 1831 in Włocławek; he was Bishop of Płock, a publisher and a publicist.

He was ordained in 1854 and from 1859, he began working with a journal Diary Religion and Moral. He was known as a great patriot, which is why he was deported to the governorate of Perm. He was able to return to Poland in 1868; however, he was not allowed to live in the capital.

In 1889, he became the bishop of the Diocese of Płock, where his particular attention was on raising the standards of the local seminary, and to increase intellectual culture of the clergy.

He died on 12 June 1896 in Warsaw and was buried in the Cathedral of Płock, where a bronze gravestone made by Pius Weloński stands in the church nave.

Religious titles
Preceded by Casper Borowski	Bishop of Płock; 1885–1896	Succeeded by Jerzy Józef Szembek
