= Hieronim Cielecki =

Bishop of Płock

- Bishop of Płock

Personal details
- Born: 1563
- Died: 1627 (aged 63–64)
- Coat of arms

Hieronim Cielecki (1563–1627) was a Polish nobleman and clergyman who was Bishop of Płock. He was born in 1563 to a family that claimed the Zaremba coat of arms. In 1606, he became canon of Kraków. Other early roles included Regent of the Minor Chancellery and chamberlain for Queen Constance, wife of Sigismund. Cielecki became Bishop of Płock in 1624. As bishop, he commissioned works for the cathedral in Płock. Cielecki died in 1627.

== See also ==
- Roman Catholic Diocese of Płock
