= Wincenty Teofil Popiel =

Polish Roman Catholic bishop (1825 – 1912)

- Archbishop of Warsaw
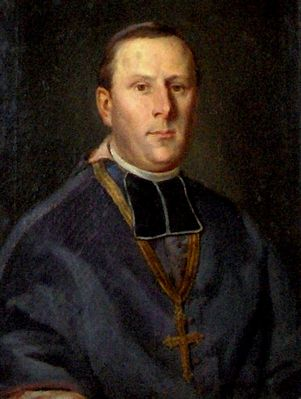
- Church: Latin Church
- In office: 15 March 1883 – 7 December 1912
- Previous posts: Bishop of Kujawy–Kaliska (1875–1883); Bishop of Płock (1863–1875)

Orders
- Ordination: 5 August 1849
- Consecration: 6 December 1863 by Henryk Ludwik Plater

Personal details
- Born: 21 July 1825 Czaple Wielkie, Kraków Voivodeship, Congress Poland, Russian Empire
- Died: 7 December 1912 (aged 87) Warsaw, Congress Poland, Russian Empire
- Buried: St. John's Archcathedral, Warsaw
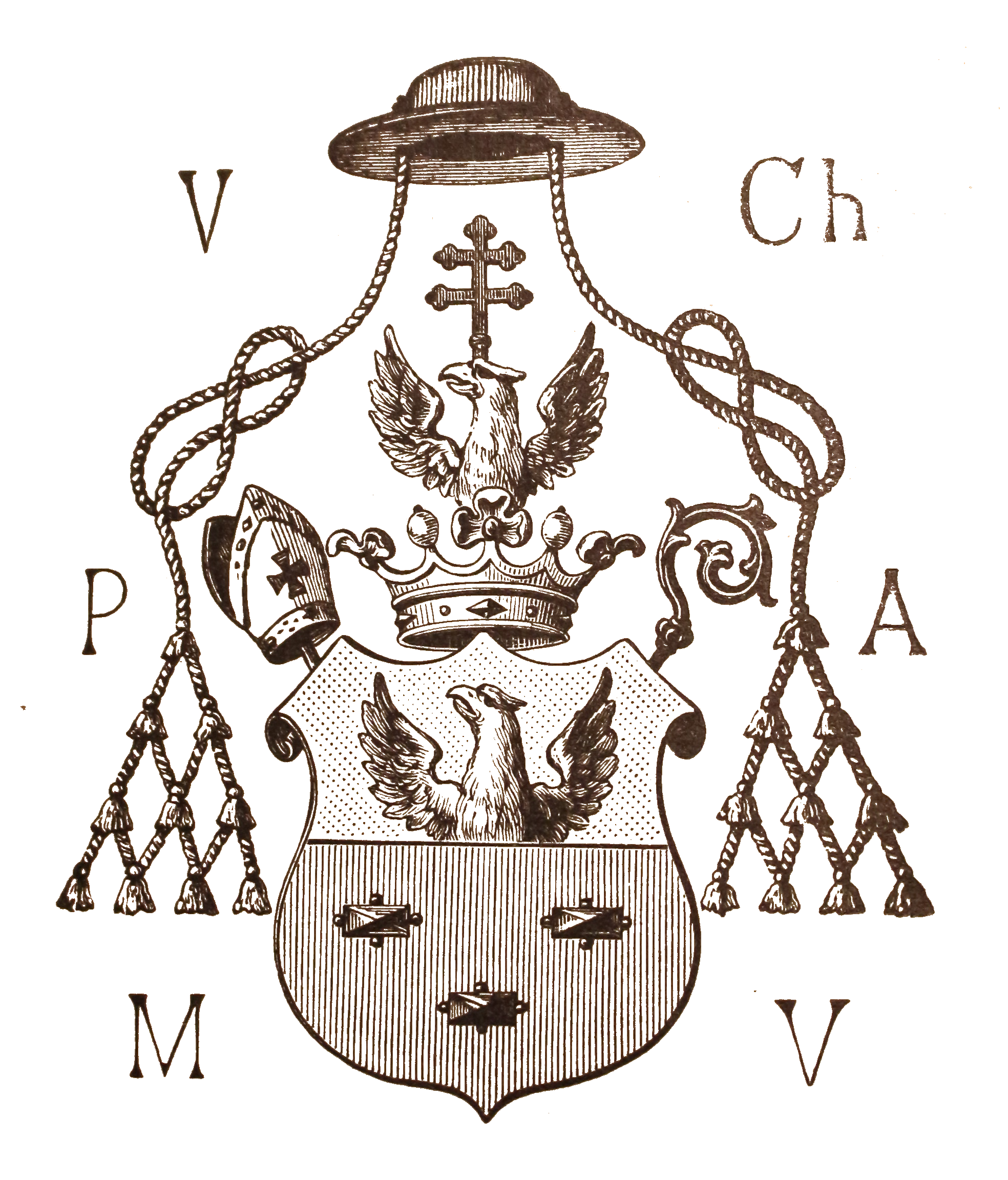
- Coat of arms

Wincenty Teofil Popiel-Chościak (21 July 1825 – 7 December 1912) was a Polish Catholic priest, Bishop of Płock from 1863 to 1875, Bishop of Kujawy–Kaliska from 1876 to 1883, and the metropolitan Archbishop of Warsaw from 1883 to 1912.

== Life ==
Popiel was the son of Konstanty Popiel, a senator of the Free City of Cracow, and Zofia von Badenich. Originally educated at home, he was sent to a boarding school run by Józef Kremer in Kraków. Afterwards, he studied law in Warsaw, completing his education in 1845 and working in the judiciary. After his father's death and his return to Czaple Wielkie, he decided to begin attending the seminary in Kielce (Wyższe Seminarium Duchowne w Kielcach) in 1847. He completed his studies there in 1849, and was ordained a priest on 5 August of the same year. He then began studying at KU Leuven in Belgium, obtaining a Bachelor of Sacred Theology in 1852 and later becoming a Doctor of Sacred Theology. He also worked in Rome, where he served as a translator for the works of the Council of Trent. Returning to Poland in 1854, he was appointed professor of the seminary in Kielce in February of the same year. He was appointed vice-regent of the seminary, defender of the bond, and honorary canon of the cathedral chapter of the Diocese of Lublin in 1855.

In 1862, Popiel was appointed rector of the Theological Academy in Warsaw, where he also taught pastoral theology. On 16 March 1863, he was appointed bishop of the Diocese of Płock by Pope Pius IX; he was consecrated on 6 December 1863 at Płock Cathedral by Henryk Ludwik Plater, co-consecrated by Tomasz Franciszek Myśliwski and Antoni Baliński. In 1868, Popiel was exiled to Veliky Novgorod, where he stayed until 1875. He was appointed bishop of Kujawy-Kaliska by papal bull on 5 July 1875. In 1883, he was appointed archbishop of Warsaw; he received his pallium on 6 May 1883 in Saint Petersburg. Popiel died on 7 December 1912 in Warsaw, and was buried in St. John's Archcathedral.

== Notes and references ==
Preceded by Zygmunt Szczęsny Feliński	Archbishop of Warsaw; 1883–1912	Succeeded by Aleksander Kakowski
