= Florian Laskary of Kościelec (bishop of Płock) =

Polish bishop

Florian Laskary of Kościelec (Polish: Florian Laskary z Kościelca; ? – 21 June 1333) was Bishop of Płock in Poland from 1317 until his death in 1333. He was also Canon of Duke Bolesław II and a chaplain at Gniezno.

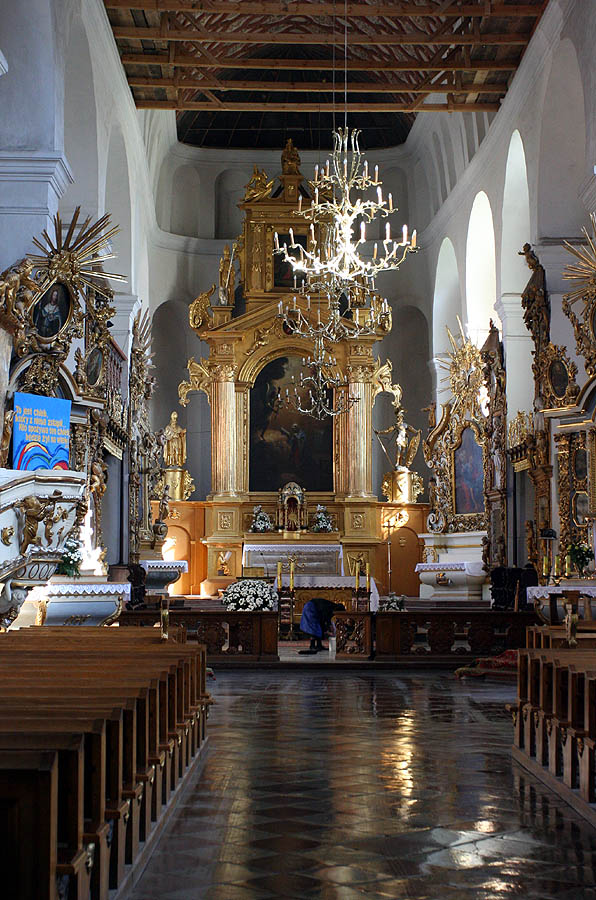
Interior of the Bazylika Zwiastowania at Pułtusk

Born into the Leszczyc noble family, he had a successful career in the medieval Polish church. From 6 August 1299 he was chaplain of the Duke of Płock, Bolesław II and was a Bishop of Płock from 1318–1333.

During his long episcopacy he tried to establish good relations with the Teutonic Knights but was one of the initiators of the conclusion of the Alliance between the Teutonic Knights and Duke Wenceslaus of Płock. He also began construction of the Bishop's Castle in Pułtusk, he died on 21 June 1333 in Pułtusk.

Religious titles
| Preceded by Jan h. Nałęcz | Bishop of Płock; 1317-1333 | Succeeded by Klemens Pierzchała |
