= Stanisław Łubieński =

Polish noble, politician and bishop

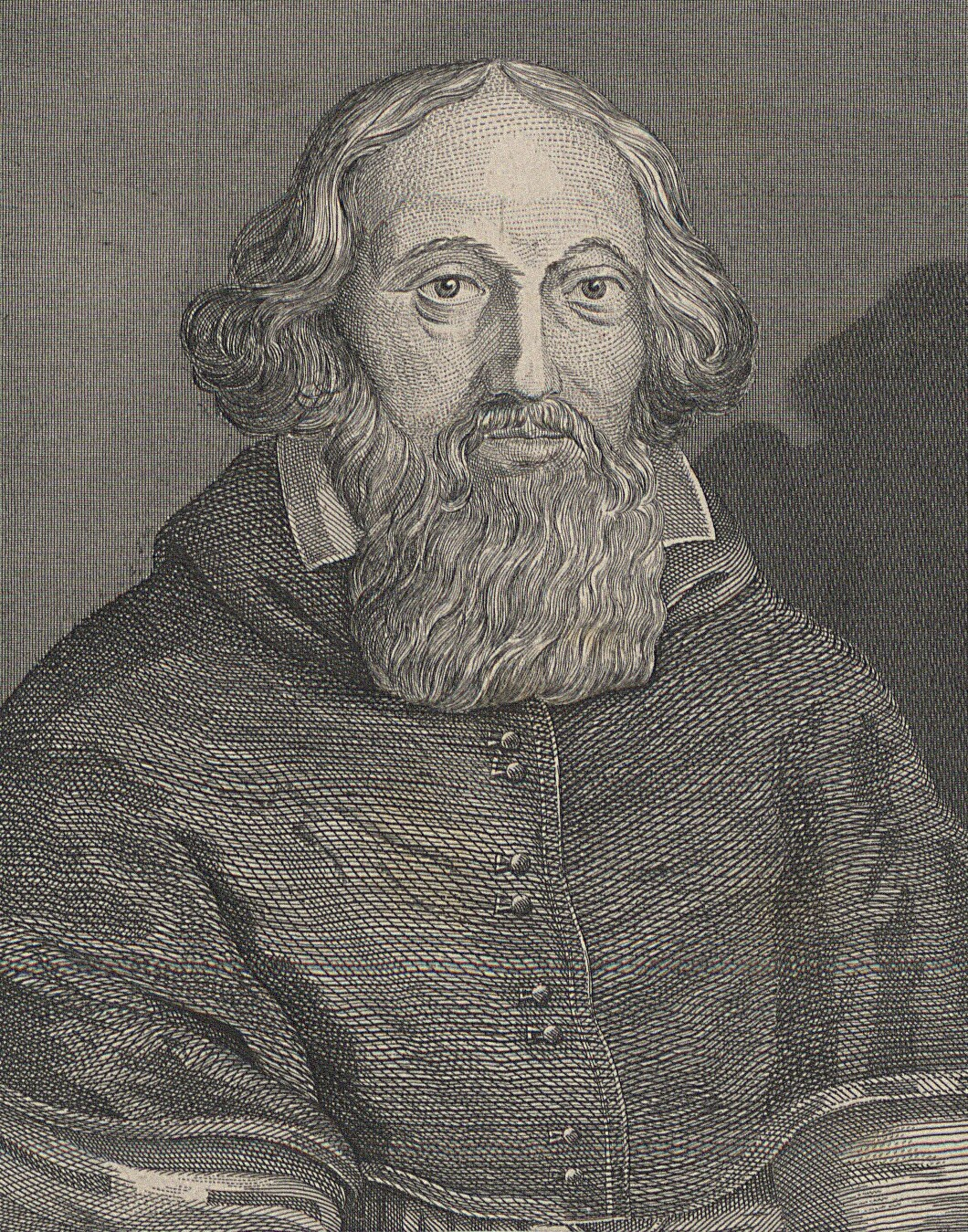

Bishop of Łuck
- Incumbent
- Assumed office 1622

Bishop of Płock
- In office 1627–1640
- Preceded by: Hieronim Cielecki
- Succeeded by: Karol Ferdynand Waza

Regent of Royal Chancellery
- In office 1614–1628

Crown Secretary

Personal details
- Born: 1573 Łubna
- Died: 16 April 1640 (aged 66–67) Wyszków
- Occupation: Polish noble, politician, bishop, Catholic priest
- Known for: Royal Secretary of King Sigismund III, Regent of Royal Chancellery, Deputy Chancellor of the Crown

Stanisław Łubieński (1573 in Łubna – 16 April 1640 in Wyszków), of Pomian coat of arms, was a Polish noble, politician and bishop. Royal Secretary of king Sigismund III of Poland from 1591; regent of Royal Chancellery from 1614, Crown Secretary, bishop of Łuck from 1622, Deputy Chancellor of the Crown from 1626 (to 1628) and bishop of Płock from 1627.

He was a Catholic priest and a strong supporter of counterreformation. Friend of the poet Maciej Sarbiewski, himself he was an author of many important historical chronicles of that period, among them a detailed description of rokosz of Zebrzydowski.

== Selected works ==
- Brevis narratio profectionis in Sueciam Sigismundi III..., 1593;
- De ortu, vita et morte Mathiae de Bużenin Pstrokoński... (1630);
- Ce motu civili in Polonia libri quatuor, Series. vitea, res gestes episcoporum Plocensium..., Kraków 1642;
- 'Opera posthuma historica historopolitica variigue discursus epistolae et aliquot orationes... (1643);
- Droga do Szwecji;
- Rozruchy domowe.

Preceded by Hieronim Cielecki	Bishop of Płock; 1627–1640	Succeeded by Karol Ferdynand Waza
