= Bernard (bishop of Płock) =

Polish bishop and friar

Bernard was a 14th-century bishop, Dominican friar and confessor of Pope Innocent VI.

== Early life ==
Although originally from Masovia, Bernard's father was banished for some reason during the Lithuanian wars, as were his family. Bernard joined the Dominican order and was confessor of Pope Innocent VI (Pope 1352–1362).

== Career ==
As an advocate for missionary work in Wallachia he was sent to Milkowa where, as a result of the death Clement Pierzchały he was appointed the Bishop of Płock by Innocent VI on 11 October 1357. Bernard was Bishop of Milkowa from 1353 until 1357 and Bishop of Płock from 1357 to 1363.

In 1360 he was negotiating with the Teutonic Knights, but these negotiations failed. By April 1363 opposition from both his superior the Archbishop of Gniezno Yaroslav and the new Pope Urban V saw Bernard fall from favor.

Religious titles
Preceded by Klemens h. Pierzchała	Bishop of Płock; 1357-1363	Succeeded by Janisław Wroński
