= Tadeusz Paweł Zakrzewski =

Polish bishop

The Most Reverend Tadeusz Paweł Zakrzewski
- Bishop of Płock
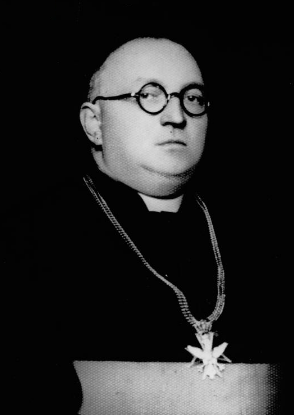
- Diocese: Diocese of Płock
- Appointed: 12 April 1946
- Predecessor: Antoni Julian Nowowiejski
- Successor: Bogdan Sikorski
- Previous post: Titular Bishop of Cariana

Orders
- Ordination: 11 February 1906
- Consecration: 22 September 1938 by August Hlond

Personal details
- Born: 11 August 1883 Skoki, Poland
- Died: 26 November 1961 (aged 78) Warsaw, Poland
- Buried: Płock Cathedral
- Denomination: Catholic

Tadeusz Paweł Zakrzewski (11 August 1883 in Skoki – 26 November 1961) was a Polish Catholic priest, auxiliary bishop of Łomża (1938–1946), bishop of Płock (1946–1961), rector of Polish Papal Institute in Rome (1928–1938).

He was one of seven children of Paweł Zakrzewski, a landowner in Skoki.

He was educated at Poznań and when he finished his schooling, he went into the seminary there. He was ordained as a subdiaconate in 1904 and as a vicar in 1908.

He became the general secretary of the Caritas union and the head of the Child Welfare Society. In 1912 he co-organized the International Eucharistic Congress in Vienna.

In 1938 he was appointed as bishop of Cariana by Pope Pius XI.

1938, he was awarded the Commander's Cross of the Order of Polonia Restituta Polish, the Order of the Yugoslav Crown II class and the Papal Gold Medal Benemerenti.

In 1939, he carried out a visitation of the Polish diaspora in France as he spoke French and German. He stayed in Ostrów during WWII.

In 1946, he was appointed diocesan bishop in Płock.

He was buried at Masovian Blessed Virgin Mary Cathedral in Płock.

== External link ==
Plock website, Remembering a bishop who healed wounds in a fatherly way, 2021

Preceded by Stanisław Figielski	Bishop of Płock; 1946-1961	Succeeded by Jan Wosiński
