= Józef Eustachy Szembek =

Former Bishop of Płock

- Bishop of Płock
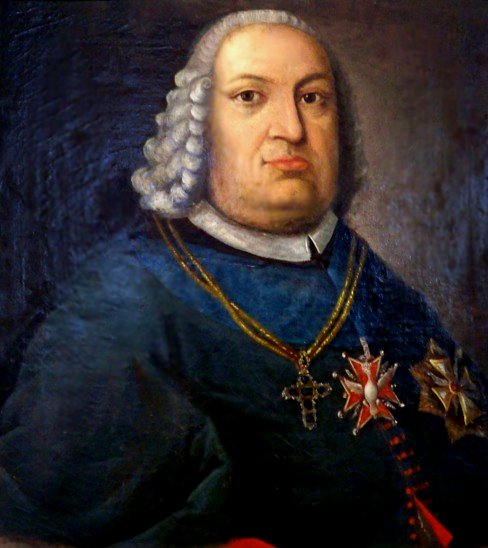
- Wearing the Order of the White Eagle
- Previous post(s): Bishop of Chełm

Personal details
- Born: 1697
- Died: c. 1758 or 1759

Józef Eustachy Szembek (born 1697) was a Polish nobleman who was Bishop of Płock from 1753.

Szembek was born in Grodziecen to Antoni, the chamberlin of Kraków. The family claimed the Szembek coat of arms. Szembek received an education in Rome and became a priest in 1720. He held multiple positions before becoming Bishop of Chełm in 1736. According to Antoni Julian Nowowiejski, Szembek was made Bishop of Płock by King August III in 1752. As bishop, Szembek republished Pope Benedict XIV's 1751 encyclical, A quo primum. In this encyclical, Benedict generally denounced efforts to expel or harm Jews in Poland, but he defended customs that placed Jews at a disadvantage in society.

Szembek died in either 1758 or 1759. Historians Ludwik Finkel and Antoni Julian Nowowiejski mention 1758. Encyclopedist Samuel Orgelbrand and Catholic-Hierarchy.org mention 1759.

== See also ==
- Roman Catholic Diocese of Płock
