= Marek (bishop of Płock) =

Polish bishop

Marek may be an eleventh-century bishop of Płock, Poland. He was mentioned by the chronicler Jan Długosz.

Historian Wojciech Kętrzyński considered him as non-historical person, like his allegedly predecessors mentioned by Długosz. Historical of Marek was still doubted by historians. If he was a bishop of Płock, he was bishop since ca. 1075, where the diocese was erected.

According to Jan Długosz, he died on 8 August 1087. We do not know which was base for this information.

Religious titles
| Preceded by - | Bishop of Płock; 1075-1087 | Succeeded by Stefan |
