= Henry of Masovia =

14th-century Polish noble and bishop

Henry of Masovia (Polish: Henryk Mazowiecki; 1368/1370 – 1392/1393) was a noble and a bishop of the Kingdom of Poland.

== Biography ==
Henry of Masovia, born between 1368 and 1370 in Rawa Mazowiecka was the youngest child of one of the Piast dynasty princes of Masovia, Siemowit III of Masovia, and his second wife, the princess of Ziębice, Anna (or Ludmiła, sources vary). His childhood was rather tragic, as described by several contemporary chroniclers, including Janko z Czarnkowa, although as the facts vary depending on the chronicle, it is assumed parts of that story became dramatised in the years that passed. According to Janko z Czarnkowa, when Anna became pregnant, Siemowit accused her of adultery and imprisoned her in the castle. After the birth of Henry, despite weak evidence, Siemowit ordered his wife strangled and the boy cast away from his court, and raised by a peasant family.

After several years, Siemowit's daughter from his first marriage, Margareta, then wife of Casimir IV of Pomerania, decided to rescue her brother and took him to her mansion in Słupsk. Eventually, when Henry was about 10 years old and it became evident he was physically very similar to Siemowit, the latter accepted him back as his son. Siemowit, who had already divided his estates among his other sons in his last will, decided that Henry should become a priest. Nonetheless, possibly driven by feelings of guilt, he convinced his other sons to agree that if Henry would ever abandon the way of priesthood, they would share his inheritance with him.

Eventually all indicated that Henry would become a priest. On 30 May 1378, he received a parish in Płock. A few years later Siemowit, who wanted Henry to obtain a parish in Łęczyca, became involved in a conflict with the archbishop of Gniezno, Janusz Suchywilk, who had already given that parish to one of his supporters. Siemowit did not accept this and, as the Polish kingdom was weakened and in a state of disarray after the death of the King of Poland (Louis I of Hungary), he took control of the disputed parish with his army and occupied it for several years.

On 18 March 1390, Henry, thanks to the efforts of his father and brothers (Janusz I, Duke of Masovia, and Siemowit IV, Duke of Masovia), became bishop of Płock, even though he had not received the Holy Orders of priesthood, as required for that position, and refused to accept ordination.

In 1391, Henry, who was known both for his incredible strength and his diplomatic skills, accepted a mission from the hands of the king of Poland, Władysław Jagiełło. Jagiełło asked him to convince his cousin, Vytautas, who at that time opposed Władysław's rise to power, to distance himself from his allies — the Teutonic Knights, enemies of the Kingdom of Poland (and her ally, the Grand Duchy of Lithuania). Henry was successful in convincing Vytautas to abandon the Knights (see Ostrów Agreement), and even more, became friends with Vytautas, who decided to marry him off to his sister, Ryngałła.

The marriage led to many repercussions. Henry, by becoming married, had violated his status in minor orders and this became one of the arguments used by the Teutonic Knights to claim that Lithuania and Poland were not really Christian and, as pagans, could be attacked as enemies of Christianity. Further, Henry died in 1392 or 1393 in Łuck, resulting in controversial claims — never verified or disproven — that he was assassinated by the Teutonic Knights (in revenge for luring away their ally, Vytautas), by his brothers (who decided not to share his father's inheritance with him once he abandoned the priesthood), or finally by his own wife, Ryngałła as accused by his brothers. Henry was buried in the Cathedral of Płock.

Catholic Church titles
Preceded by Ścibor z Radzymina	Bishop of Płock; 1390–1393	Succeeded by Maffiolus de Lampugnano
