= Werner (bishop of Płock) =

Polish bishop (died 1170)

Werner (died 5 February 1170) was a Polish bishop. He was bishop of Płock from 1156 to 1170.

== Biography ==
He was probably a German.

He witnessed, on the privilege of Princess Salomei, for the abbey in Mogilno (around 1143) as a chaplain (canon) of the collegiate church of St. Peter in Kruszwica. He was a close associate of Prince Bolesław IV the Curly, who in 1156 appointed him a bishop of Płock. In 1161, he participated in a rally in Łęczyca.

In 1165, he presided over the message to Emperor Frederick I in Aachen. He brought relics of Sigismund of Burgundy from Germany. Sigismund of Burgundy became later patron of Płock. He was an advocate of the imperial antipopes of Victor IV, Paschalis III and Kalikst III, he represented the Polish Episcopate at the canonization celebrations of Charlemagne in 1165, led by Paschalis III.

He died a martyr's death, murdered on the orders of the magnate, who lost a court dispute with him about the village of Karso (Szarsko?). He was worshiped by the faithful after death and placed in the lists of saints and blessed at the time, but due to his support for the anti-Pope his cult did not gain the recognition of the Church after the schism.

In the older literature, his martyrdom is sometimes erroneously dated to 1172.

Some contemporary historians identify him with Warner, Bishop of Włocławek, mentioned in the papal bull of Eugene III from 1148. This identification, however possible, is not supported by any positive source message.
