= Stefan (bishop of Płock) =

Polish bishop

Stefan was an eleventh-century Bishop of Płock, Poland.

He was from the Pobóg noble family and was bishop from 1088 till 1099 AD. Although there are no written histories written about him, his grave was found during a 16th-century reconstruction of the Cathedral by Bishop, Andrzej Noskowski.

According to Wojciech Kętrzyński it was Stefan and not Marek that was the first historical Bishop of Płock and that he held this office about 1076.

Religious titles
Preceded by Marek	Bishop of Płock; 1088 - 1099	Succeeded by Filip
