= Płock Diadem =

Reliquary crown held in Płock, Poland

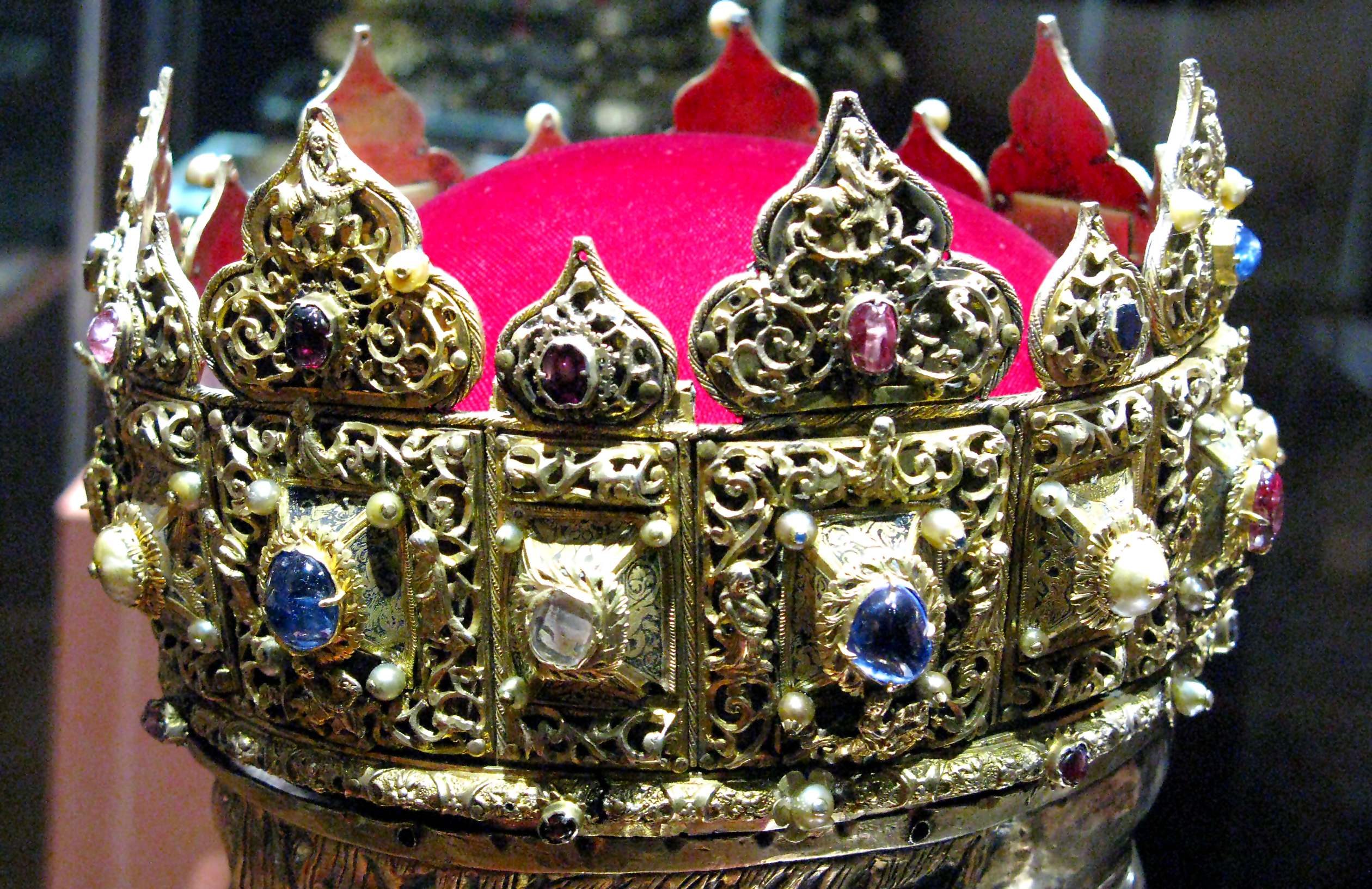
Płock Diadem, Ducal Crown attributed to Konrad I of Masovia.

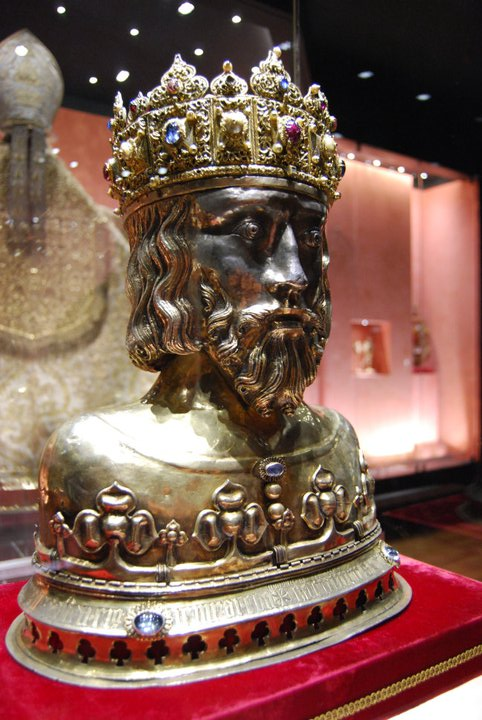
Reliquary of St. Sigismund.

The Płock Diadem (Polish: Diadem płocki) is a reliquary crown held in the city of Płock, in central Poland. It was created in the beginning of the 13th century probably in Hungary and was brought to Poland in the Middle Ages. This filigree diadem is wrought of silver and gold, being set with sapphires, rubies, almandines and pearls.

== History ==
The diadem was brought to Poland by one of the Hungarian princesses. Later assigned to Konrad I of Masovia, Duke of Masovia it served as the personal crown of the Dukes of Masovia and was kept in the Płock Cathedral.

In 1601 by order of King Sigismund III Vasa the diadem was placed by a goldsmith Stanisław Zemelka on reliquary of St. Sigismund (patron saint of the King, also kept in the Masovian Blessed Virgin Mary Cathedral in Płock). This reliquary takes the form of a bust and it was established by King Casimir III the Great in the 14th century to comprise relics of that saint. The reliquary was made in Kraków between 1351–1356 and it depicts the King.

The reliquary was looted by the Germans during World War II, and later reclaimed.

== See also ==
- Płock Cathedral
- Polish Crown Jewels
- Royal Casket
- Szczerbiec
