= Ścibor z Gościeńczyc =

Polish Roman Catholic priest

Ścibor z Gościeńczyc (literally: Ścibor of Gościeńczyce; died 4 May 1471) was a Polish Roman Catholic priest and the bishop of Płock since 1463.

He was son of Jan, stolnik of Czersk. His older brothers were Andrzej z Gościeńczyc, a cupbearer of Ciechanów, and Jakub z Gościeńczyc i Mińska, a castellan of Czersk.

In 1435 he became a student of the Kraków Academy (now Jagiellonian University), however it is not certain whether he graduated.

After the death of Paweł Giżycki, a bishop of Płock, Ścibor was elected his successor. It was against the will of Kazimierz IV Jagiellończyk, King of Poland, who supported Jakub of Sienno. As a bishop Ścibor supported the policy of princes of Mazovia.

Ścibor z Gościeńczyc died on 4 May 1471.
