= Maffiolus de Lampugnano =

Polish bishop

Maffiolus de Lampugnano, was a medieval bishop of the Roman Catholic Church.

Early in his career he was the collector of tithes. He was also a treasurer at the court of Pope Urban VI who wanted to appoint him Bishop of Krakow, but relented due to the protest of Wladyslaw Jagiello and Krakow cathedral chapter.

In October 1385, he was appointed Archbishop of Dubrovnik (Ragusa), Croatia. Then from 10 July 1387 until 1 March 1392 he was Archbishop of Messina, Italy. On 1 March 1392, he was finally appointed Archbishop of Kraków, by Pope Boniface IX and a year later, on 17 April 1393, was appointed bishop of Płock, Poland.

He died on 27 July 1396 and is buried in the Vatican.

== External links and additional sources ==
- Cheney, David M. "Diocese of Dubrovnik (Ragusa)". Catholic-Hierarchy.org. (for Chronology of Bishops) ^{[self-published]}
- Chow, Gabriel. "Diocese of Dubrovnik (Croatia)". GCatholic.org. (for Chronology of Bishops) ^{[self-published]}

Religious titles
Preceded by Henryk Mazowiecki	Bishop of Płock; 1393-1396	Succeeded by Jakub z Korzkwi
