= Klemens Pierzchała =

Polish bishop

Klemens Pierzchała (died September 1357) was bishop of Płock in the years 1337–1357, as well as dean and provost of Płock.

Before he was elected in 1333 by the cathedral chapter, he was the dean and provost of the Płock bishop. However, it was only around 1337 that the government in the diocese took over the preconfiguration. During his long reign, he cooperated closely with the Mazovian princes. He also enlarged the area of church property. Probably in 1339 [1] he issued a location charter for Pułtusk. He was a witness in the Polish-Teutonic Warsaw treaty in 1339.
