= Piotr Dunin Wolski =

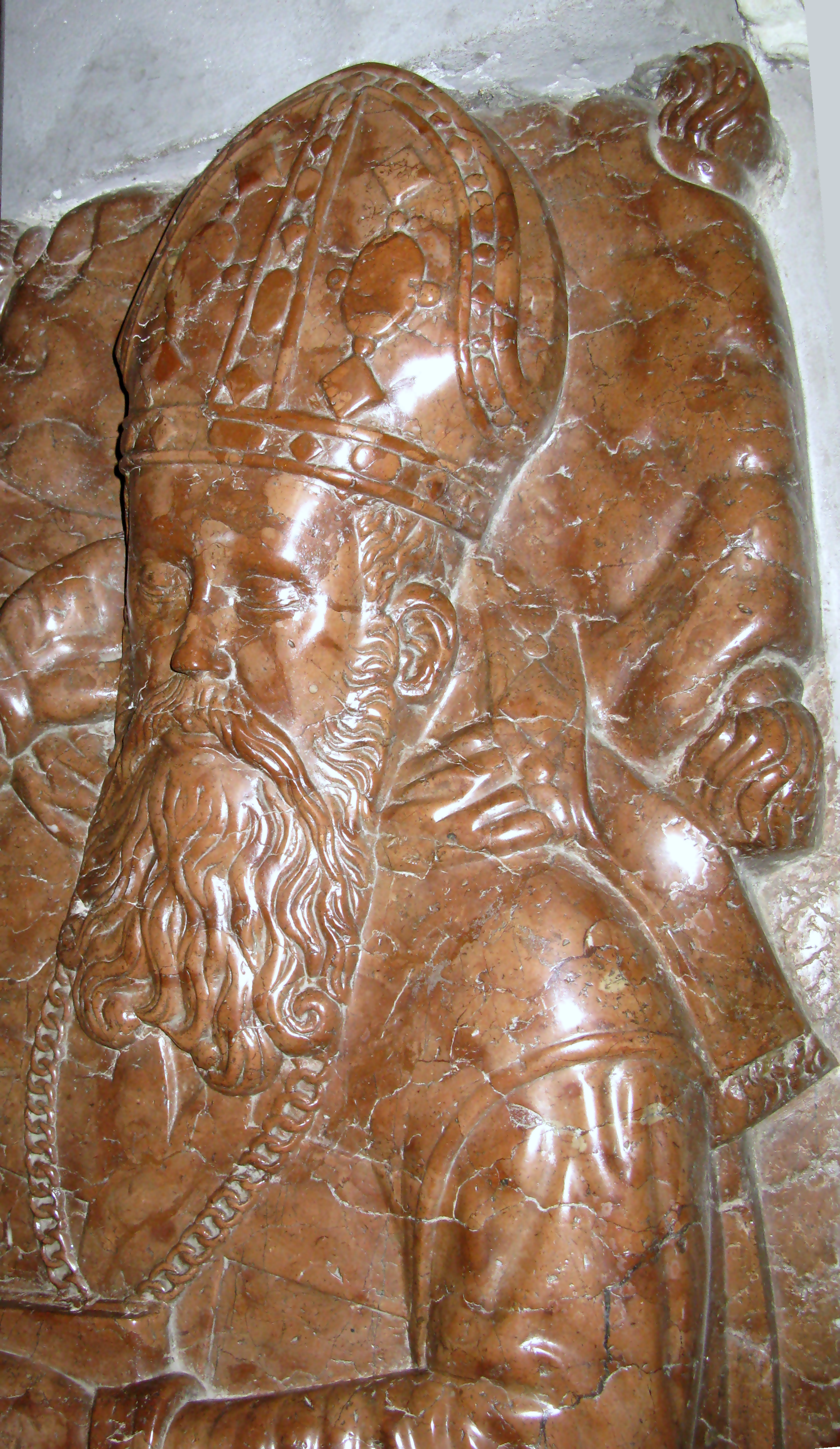
Piotr Dunin-Wolski.

Piotr Dunin Wolski of the Łabędź coat of arms (1531 – 20 August 1590) was bishop of Płock from 1577 and Przemyśl from 1576, chancellor of the Crown from 1574 and chancellor of the Crown from 1576, diplomatic representative of the Republic in the Kingdom of Spain in 1561, internuncio of the Republic in Spain in 1569.

== Family ==
He was the son of Paweł Dunin-Wolski, the grand crown chancellor, the Poznań bishop (1544-1546) and Dorota Wiewiecka h. Jastrzębiec. He had four brothers and six sisters.

== Early life ==
He studied abroad (Padua, Rome, Madrid). In 1545 he received the Poznań canon. After returning from Italy, he stayed at the court of King Zygmunt August, where he became known as a man especially talented for foreign languages and for service in diplomacy. Hence, in 1560, after the death of Queen Bona, he was sent to Madrid in Spain, where he spent 10 years, trying to regain the so-called. Neapolitan sums. After returning to Poland, he was again sent to Spain after the death of Piotr Barzego, the castellan of Przemyśl and a Polish deputy who made wrong decisions in state matters, which required immediate intervention and repair. As a member, he was also sent to Pope Gregory XIII. His diplomatic successes were due to very good knowledge of Italian, French and Spanish. Canceled from Spain, he returned to Poland in 1573.

== Episcopal career ==
In recognition of his diplomatic talent, Henry of Valois appointed him in 1574, at the coronation sejm of the Crown Deputy, and then Stefan Batory as the Grand Chancellor of the Crown in 1576 and the Bishop of Przemyśl. Shortly thereafter, he submitted the chancellor's seal to Jan Zamoyski, and having not yet approved the papacy for the diocese of Przemyśl, he was nominated for the bishopric in Płock, where his rule lasted from 5 July 1577 until his death on 28 August 1590.

In 1575 he signed the election of Maximilian II, Holy Roman Emperor. In 1589, he was a signatory of the ratification of the Treaty of Bytom and Będzin at the pacification parliament.

As a bishop of Płock, he twice conducted a diocesan synod in Płock and Pułtusk (1586 and 1589), which contributed to the reception of the reform undertaken at the Council of Trent in the diocese of Płock. He built the bishop's palace in Wyszków (1589); he renewed the collegiate church in Pułtusk.

He was also known as a bibliophile - imported from abroad books he had set in light yellow parchment and brown skin. Accumulated books were donated by the Kraków Academy (about 1000 volumes) and the library of the Płock chapter (130 works).
