= Leon Wetmański =

Polish Catholic auxiliary Bishop

Leon Wetmański (10 April 1886 - 1941) was a Polish Catholic auxiliary Bishop of the Płock diocese who was killed in Soldau concentration camp. He was beatified in 1999 as one of the 108 Blessed Polish Martyrs.

== Education ==
He was born in 1886 to a wealthy family. From 1895 to 1900 he attended the commune school in Żuromin. In 1902 he began studying at the teachers' seminar in Wymyślin but was expelled in the last year of his studies due to signing a petition requesting the Polish language be included in the curriculum. Eventually he was admitted to the Higher Theological Seminary in Płock and on 23 June 1912 he was ordained as a priest. He then continued his studies and attended the Saint Petersburg Roman Catholic Theological Academy, where he graduated in 1916.

== Work ==
Due to World War I, he could not immediately return to Poland after graduation, so he remained in St. Petersburg, where he helped refugees by organizing an orphanage. He worked at a school and seminary before returning to Poland. In 1918 he was able to return to Poland. He participated in a campaign against alcoholism and in 1921 he began working at the Divine Mercy Sanctuary. In 1927 he became auxiliary bishop of the Diocese of Płock and was ordained as a bishop in 1928. He engaged in charity work, opening a canteen that served 500 lunches daily free of charge. He operated the canteen until his arrest on 11 November 1939 by the Nazis. Initially he was released, and he went back to work, but he was re-arrested in 1940 and sent to Słupno and then to Soldau concentration camp, where he was put in a cell with other priests. While imprisoned he continued to hold services in secret. His exact date of death is unclear; German documents list his official date of death as 10 October 1941, although other accounts indicate he was shot in the summer after the typhus epidemic.
