= Miłkowa =

- Village
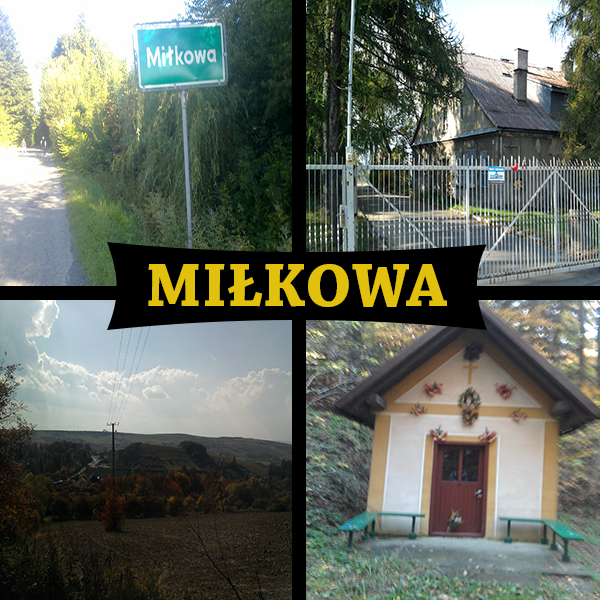

- Location within Poland
- Coordinates: 49°42′40″N 20°46′11″E
- Country: Poland
- Voivodeship: Lesser Poland
- County: Nowy Sącz
- Gmina: Korzenna

Miłkowa [mʲiu̯ˈkɔva] is a village in the administrative district of Gmina Korzenna, within Nowy Sącz County, Lesser Poland Voivodeship, in southern Poland.
