= Roman Catholic Diocese of Płock =

Roman Catholic diocese in Poland

Coordinates: 52.5410°N 19.6898°E

Diocese of Płock Dioecesis Plocensis Diecezja Płocka

Catholic
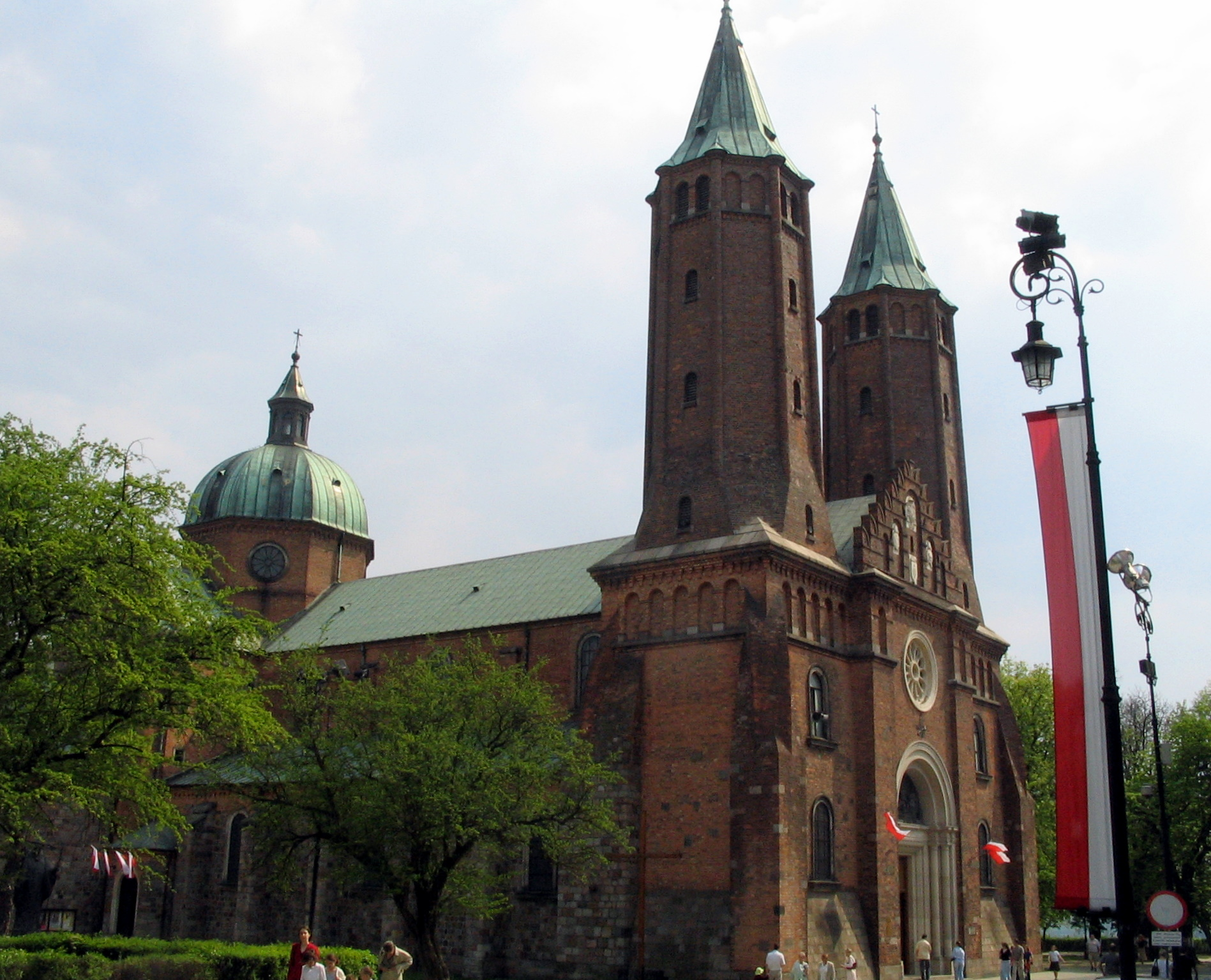
- Cathedral of St. Mary of Masovia in Płock

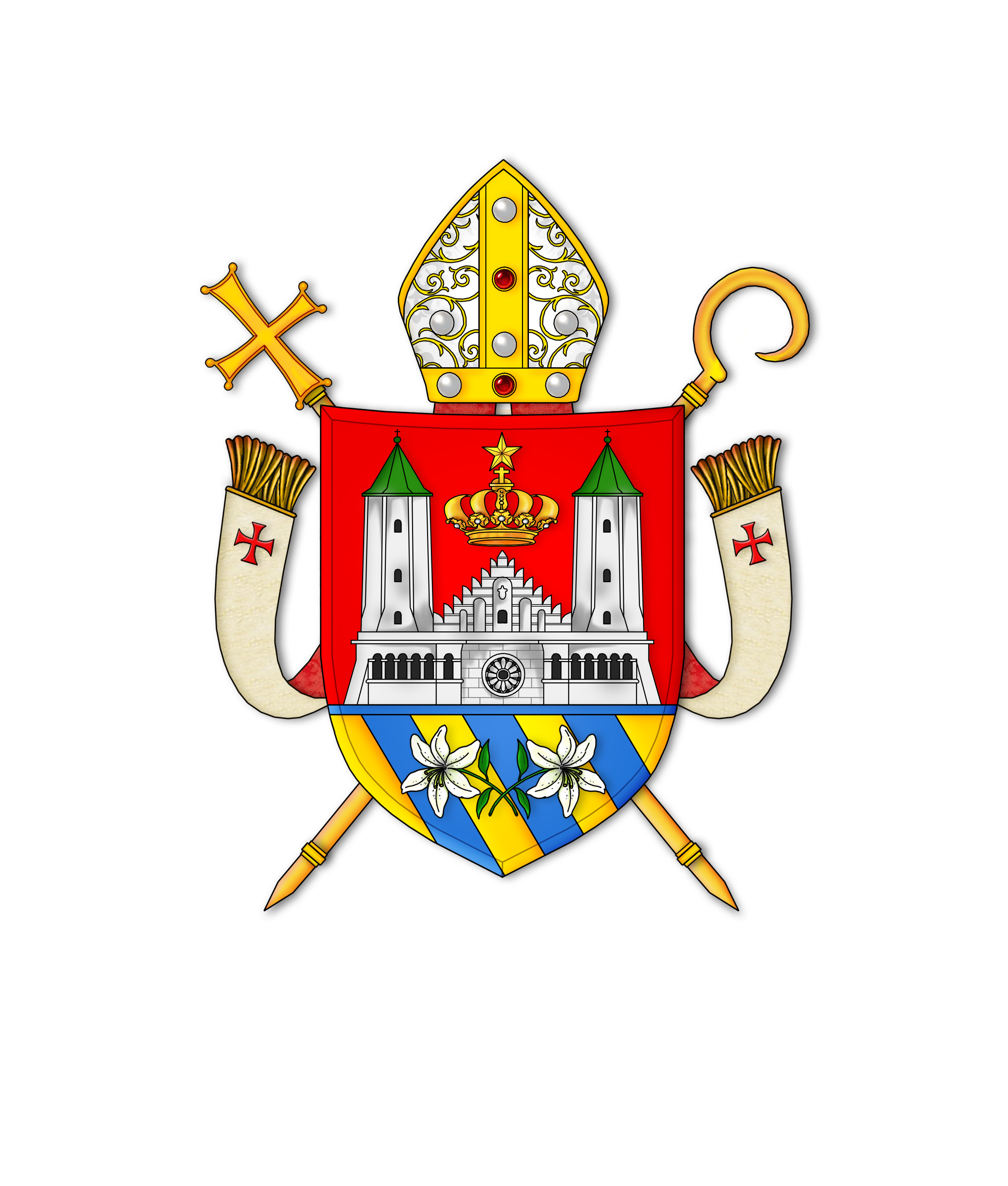
- Coat of arms

Location
- Country: Poland
- Ecclesiastical province: Warszawa
- Metropolitan: Archdiocese of Warszawa

Statistics
- Area: 11,000 km^{2} (4,200 sq mi)
- Population: Total; Catholics: (as of 2019); 807,089; 800,120 (99,1%)

Information
- Denomination: Catholic Church
- Rite: Latin Rite
- Established: 1075
- Cathedral: Bazylika katedralna Wniebowzięcia Najświętszej Maryi Panny; Cathedral of St. Mary of Masovia in Płock

Current leadership
- Pope: Leo XIV
- Bishop: Szymon Stułkowski
- Metropolitan Archbishop: Kazimierz Nycz
- Auxiliary Bishops: Mirosław Milewski
- Bishops emeritus: Piotr Libera

Map

Website
- Website of the Diocese

The Diocese of Płock (Latin: Dioecesis Plocensis) is a Latin Church diocese of the Catholic Church located in the city of Płock in the ecclesiastical province of Warszawa in Poland.

Sunday mass attendance in 2013 was 30.7% of the population (39.1% Polish average) placing it to the group of less religious dioceses in the country.

== History ==
- 1075: Established as Diocese of Płock
- During the German occupation of Poland (World War II), the Archbishop of Płock Antoni Julian Nowowiejski and the auxiliary Bishop Leon Wetmański were imprisoned in the village of Słupno, and then in 1941 murdered in the Soldau concentration camp, where also many other priests from Płock were killed. Nowowiejski and Wetmański are now considered two of the 108 Blessed Polish Martyrs of World War II by the Catholic Church. The Cathedral's ancient treasury, church archives and the diocesan library in Płock were robbed by the Germans, and taken to museums in Königsberg, Wrocław and Berlin.
- 2018: Płock Cathedral along with the entire Wzgórze Tumskie ("Tumskie Hill") listed by the President of Poland as a Historic Monument of Poland.

== Special churches ==
- Minor Basilicas:
  - Bazylika pw. Zwiastowania NMP, Czerwińsk
    (Assumption)
  - Bazylika pw. Zwiastowania NMP (Parafię św. Mateusza), Pułtusk
    (Annunciation)
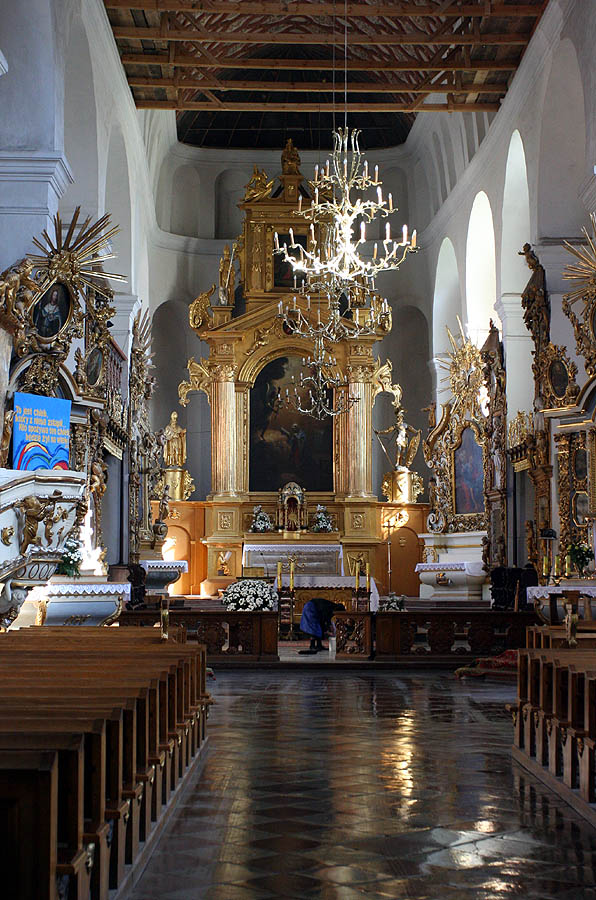
    The Interior of the Bazylika Zwiastowania at Pułtusk

== Leadership ==
- Bishops of Płock (Roman rite)
  - Archbishop Wojciech Baranowski (1591–1607)
  - Archbishop Henryk Firlej (1617–1624)
  - Bishop Jan Gembicki (1655.05.11 – 1674.03.13)
  - Bishop Andrzej Chryzostom Załuski (1692.10.15 – 1699.05.25)
  - Bishop Andrzej Stanisław Załuski (1723.11.22 – 1736.11.19)
  - Bishop Antoni Sebastian Dembowski (1737–?)
  - Bishop Józef Eustachy Szembek (1753–1758)
  - Archbishop Michał Jerzy Poniatowski (1773–1784)
  - Bishop Iraklij Listovskyj (1783 – 1809.08.30)
  - Bishop Krzysztof Hilary Szembek (1784.10.02 – 1797.09.05)
  - Bishop Ivan Krasovskyj (1809.09.22 – 1826)
  - Bishop Tomasz Ostaszewski, S.J. (1815.09.04 – 1817.01.17)
  - Bishop Adam Michał Prażmowski (1818–?)
  - Archbishop Wincenty Teofil Popiel (1863.03.16 – 1875.07.05)
  - Archbishop Franciszek Albin Symon (1897.07.21 – 1901.04.15)
  - Archbishop Jerzy Józef Szembek (1901.04.16 – 1903.11.09)
  - Archbishop Apollinary Wnukowski (1904.04.01 – 1908)
  - Archbishop Antoni Julian Nowowiejski (1908.06.12 – 1941.05.28)
  - Bishop Tadeusz Paweł Zakrzewski (1946.04.12 – 1961.11.26)
  - Bishop Bogdan Sikorski (1964.01.21 – 1988.02.04)
  - Archbishop Zygmunt Kamiński (1988.02.04 – 1999.05.01)
  - Archbishop Stanisław Wielgus (1999.05.24 – 2006.12.06)
  - Bishop Piotr Libera (2007.05.02 – 2022.06.04)
  - Bishop Szymon Stułkowski (since 2022.10.31)

== See also ==
- Roman Catholicism in Poland

== Sources ==
- GCatholic.org
- Catholic Hierarchy
- Diocese website
