= Płock Cathedral =

Roman Catholic cathedral in Płock, Poland

Coordinates: 52°32′28″N 19°41′23″E

Płock Cathedral Katedra Płocka
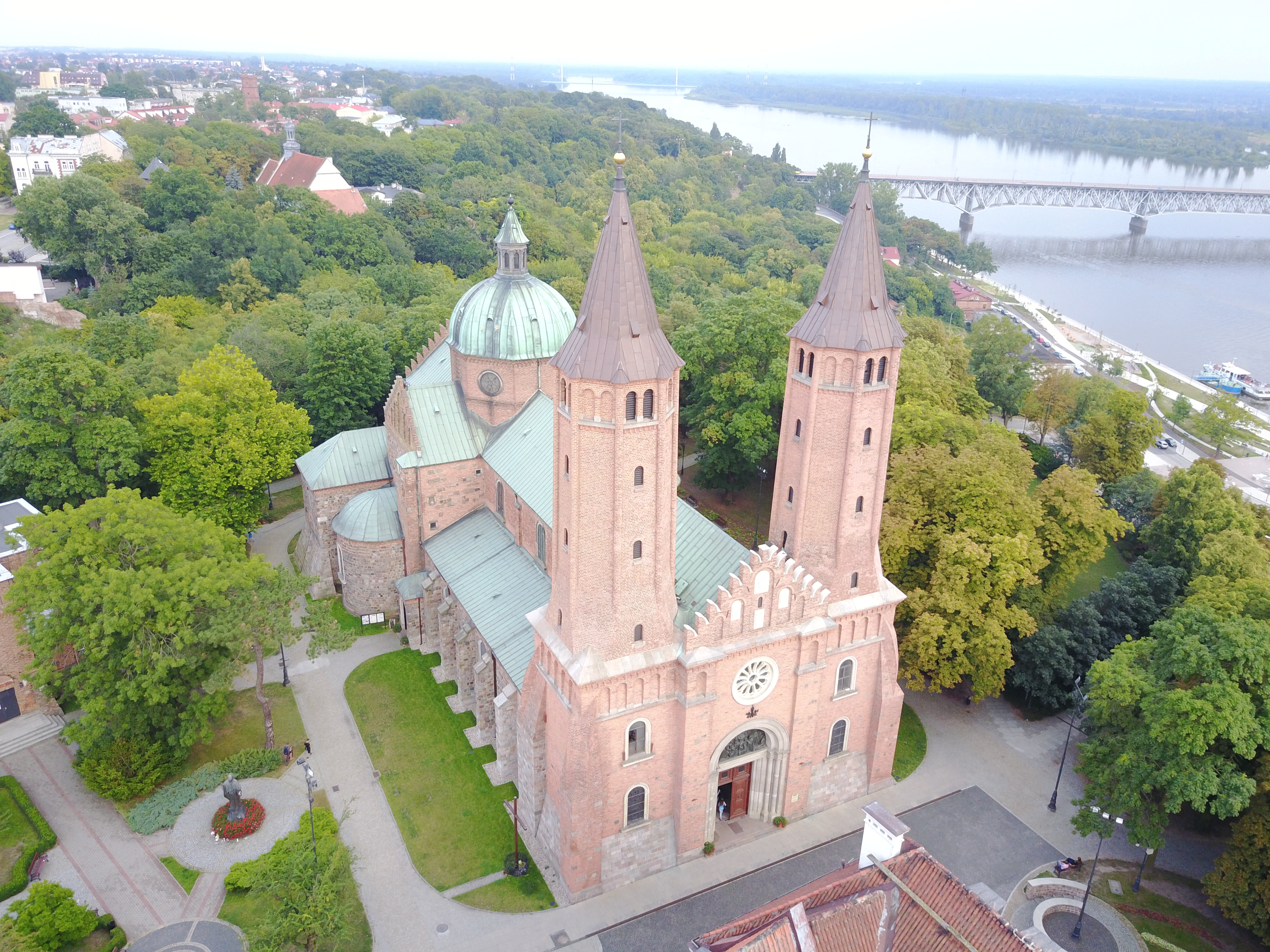

Religion
- Affiliation: Roman Catholic
- Diocese: Old Town

Location
- Location: Płock, Poland
- Interactive map of Płock Cathedral; Katedra Płocka

Architecture
- Style: Romanesque, Renaissance
- Completed: 1144

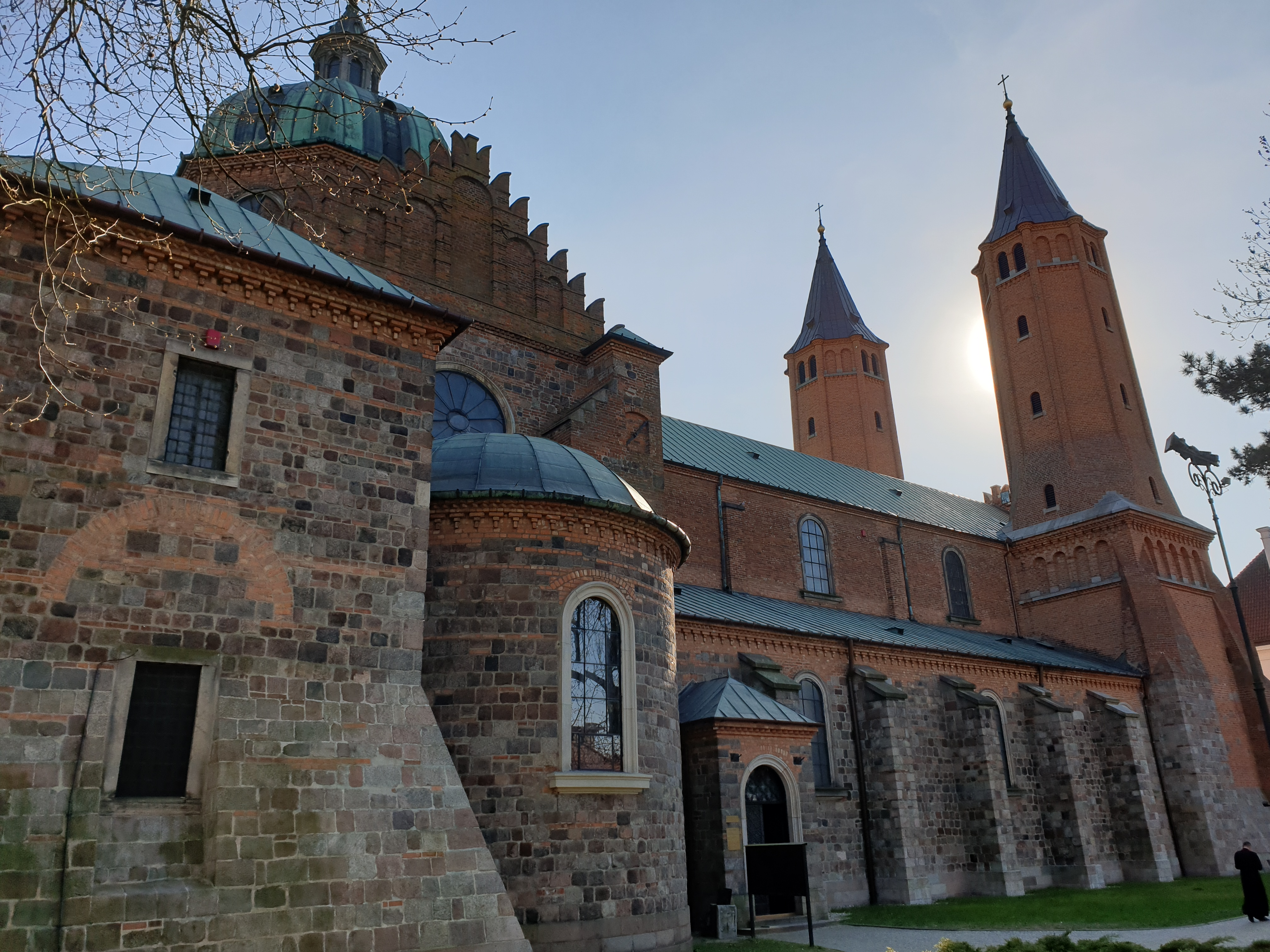
The original rotunda made of stone which dates back to the early 12th century

Płock Cathedral (Polish: Katedra Płocka), or the Cathedral of the Blessed Virgin Mary of Masovia, is a Roman Catholic cathedral in the city of Płock, in central Poland. It is an example of 12th-century Romanesque architecture and is the oldest and most important historical monument in the city, which contains the tombs of several Polish monarchs. It is listed as a Historic Monument of Poland.

== History ==
The bishopric in Płock was founded about 1075. The first definite reference to the cathedral is in 1102, when Władysław I Herman was buried there. The present Romanesque cathedral was built after 1129 by prince Bolesław III Wrymouth and Bishop Aleksander of Malonne. This was a rebuilding following a fire and took from 1136 until 1144. It was consecrated in 1144 as the Church of the Blessed Virgin Mary. The original bronze doors of the Romanesque cathedral (now in Novgorod, Russia) have figurative bas-reliefs depicting the verses of the so-called "Roman Confession of Faith", and the figure of Alexander of Malonne, bishop of Płock. The doors were made in the Magdeburg workshop about 1150. In the cathedral there is now a bronze replica of the doors, made in the 1980s. In the Royal Chapel on the north side of the cathedral is a marble sarcophagus forming the tomb of two Polish rulers, Władysław I Herman and his son Bolesław III Wrymouth.

Following a major fire in 1530, the building was reconstructed by Bishop Andzej Krzycki as a new Renaissance style church (1531–1535). This was the first large Renaissance style cathedral in Poland, although it reused granite ashlar portions of the Romanesque basilica. The architects were Bernardino de Gianotis from Rome, Giovanni Cini da Siena and Philippo da Fiesole. The layout of the new cathedral was based on the Renaissance basilicas of Rome (Sant'Agostino, Santa Maria del Popolo). However the external architecture remains in the style of North Italian brick churches, more similar to local late Gothic ones in Masovia, and may be the result of rebuilding work about 1560 by Giovanni Battista of Venice, who added the spacious choir and two western towers.

The building was restored in 1903, when the present front elevation facing west and the towers was re-designed by the architect in charge of the restoration, Stefan Szyller. Between the world wars, the interior was decorated with additional frescoes by Władysław Drapiewski and Czesław Idźkiewicz, local student of Józef Mehoffer graduating from the Academy in Kraków.

In 2018, due to its historical, artistic, scientific, material and landscape values, the Cathedral along with the entire Wzgórze Tumskie ("Tumskie Hill") was listed by the President of Poland as a Historic Monument of Poland.

== Burials ==
=== Polish monarchs ===
- Władysław I Herman
- Bolesław III Wrymouth
- Bolesław IV the Curly
- Konrad I of Masovia
- Bolesław II of Masovia

=== Other ===
- Tadeusz Paweł Zakrzewski
- Henry of Masovia
- Michał Nowodworski

== Gallery ==
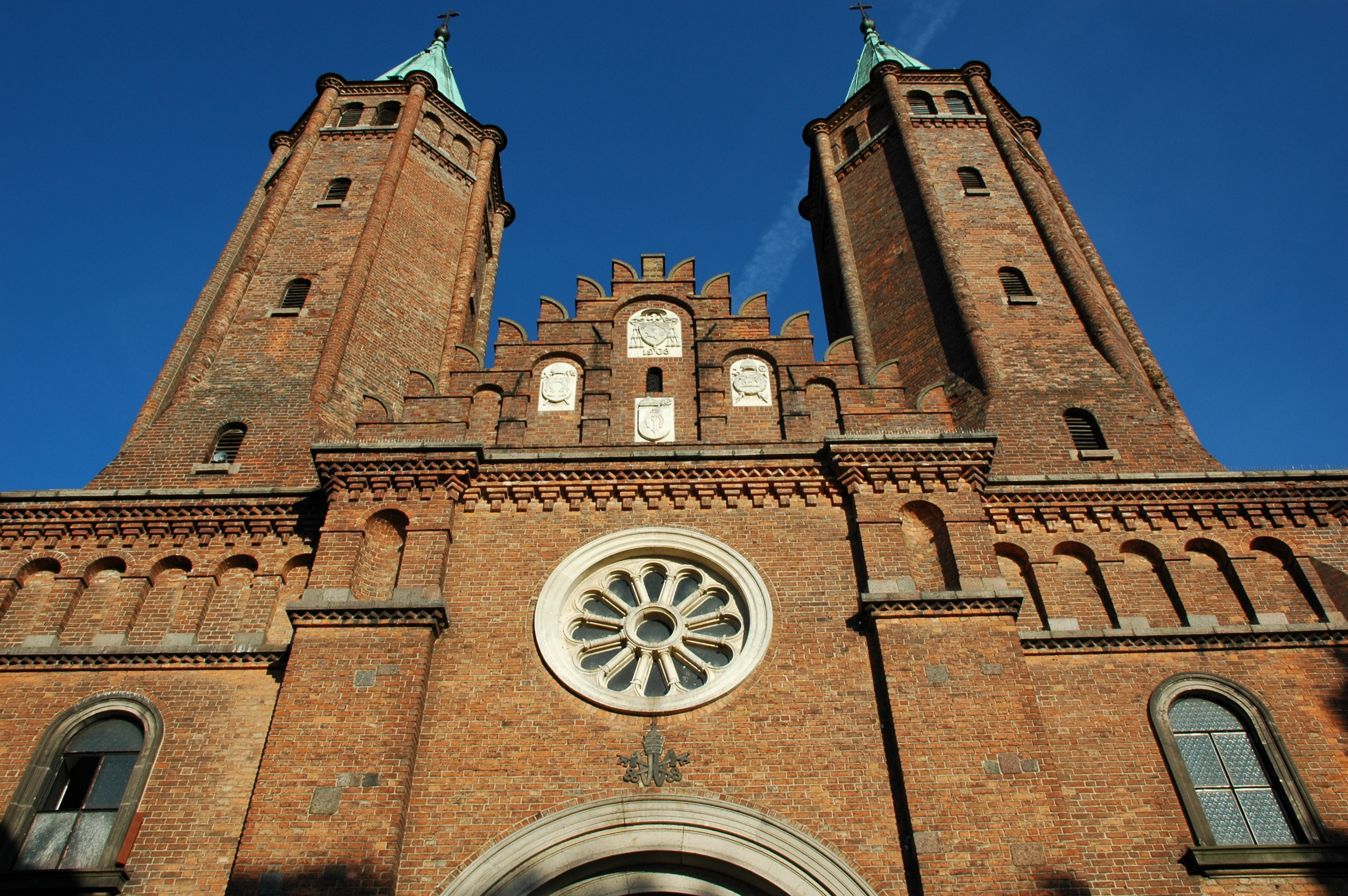
Façade

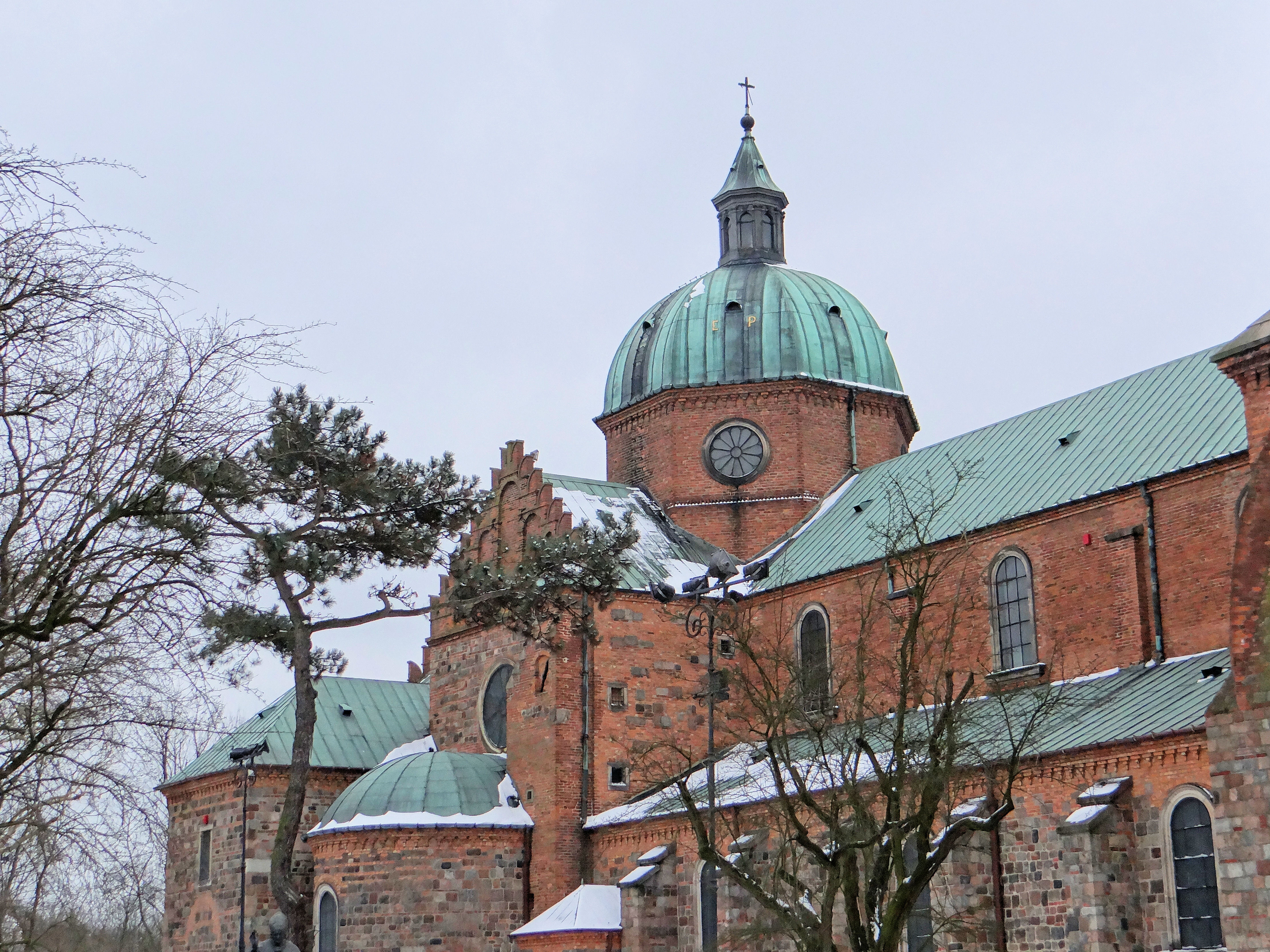
Renaissance dome of the Płock Cathedral

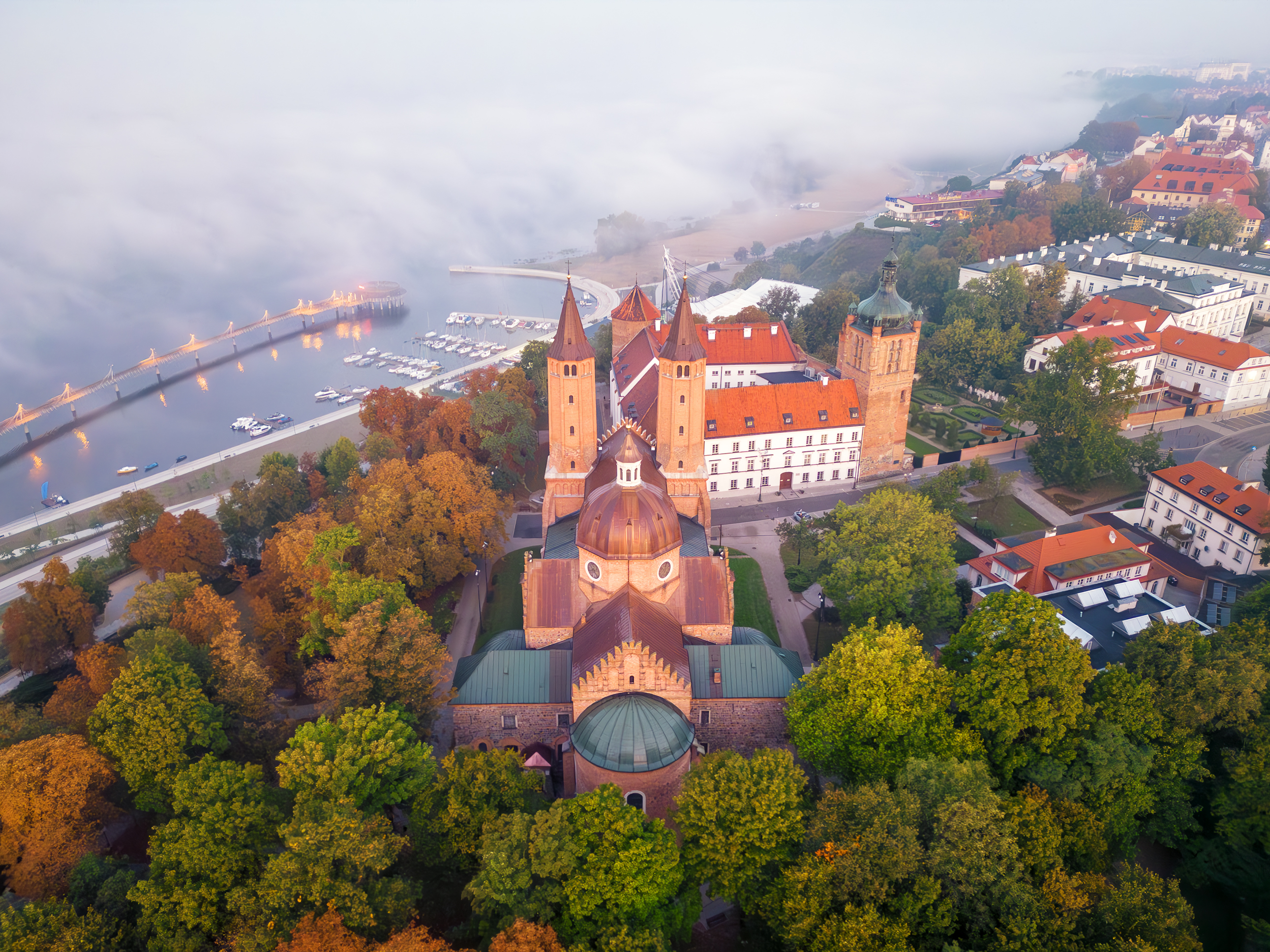
Aerial view of the cathedral

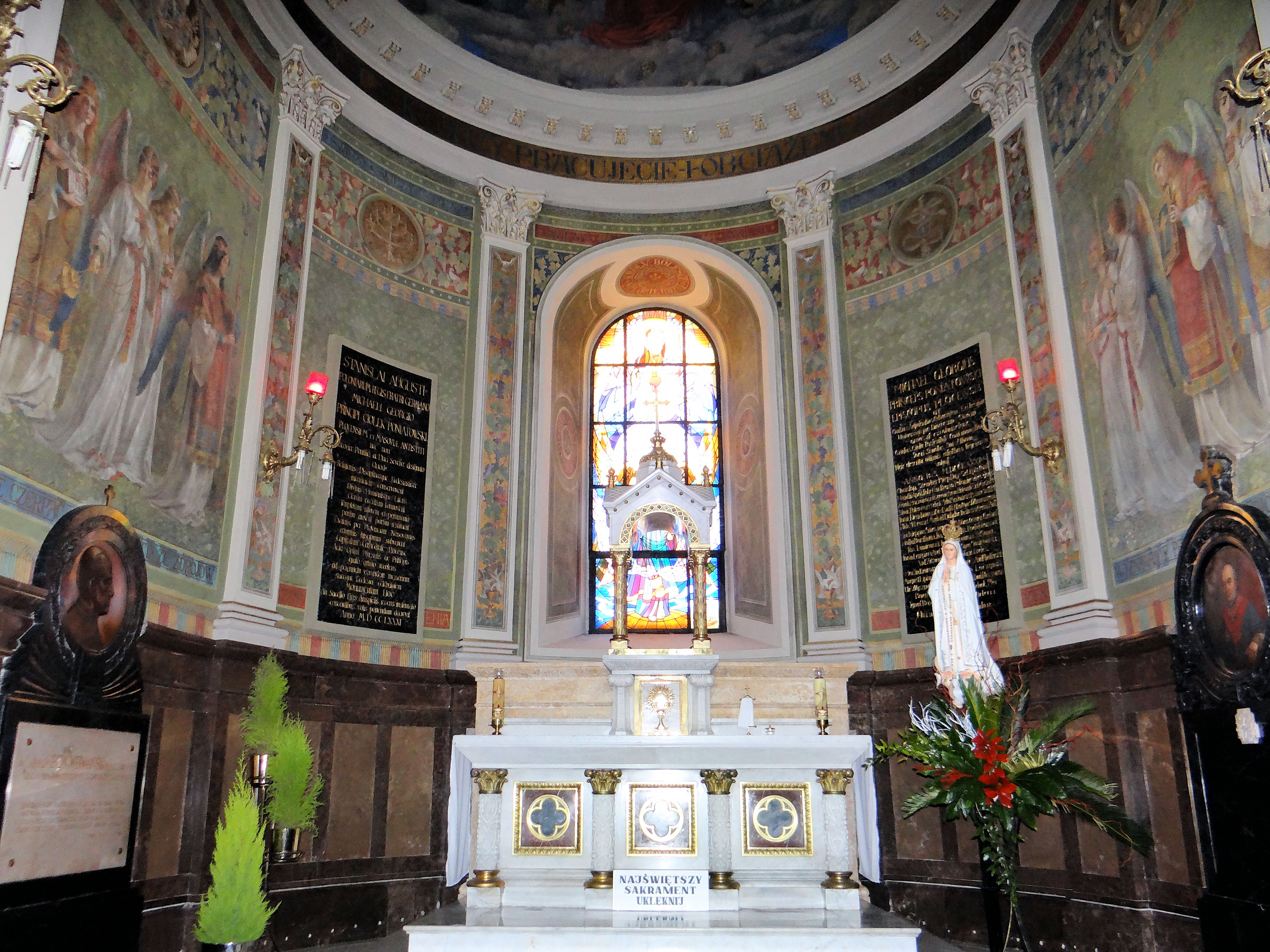
Holy Sacrament Chapel

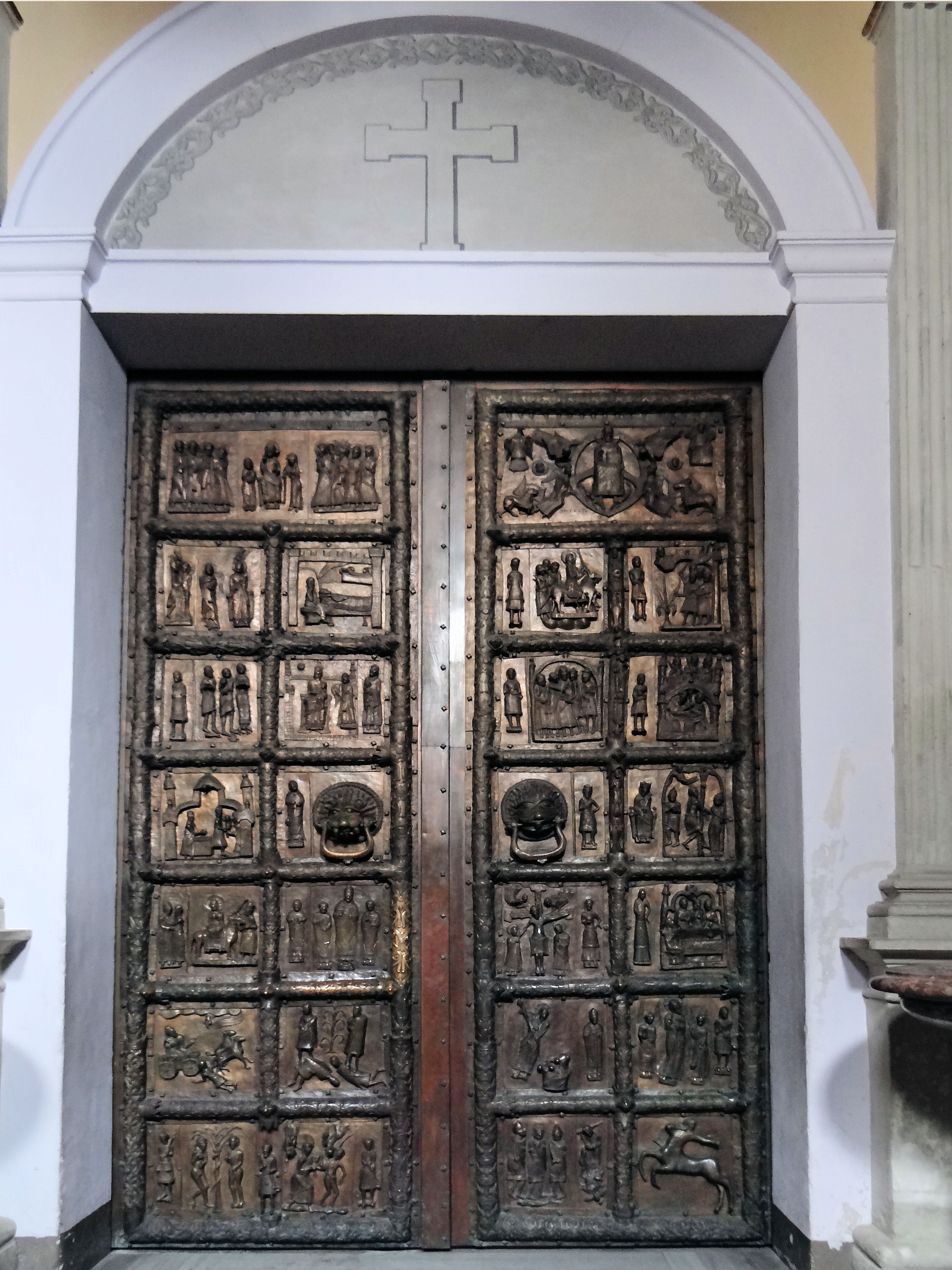
Replica of the Płock Doors (original in Velikiy Novgorod)

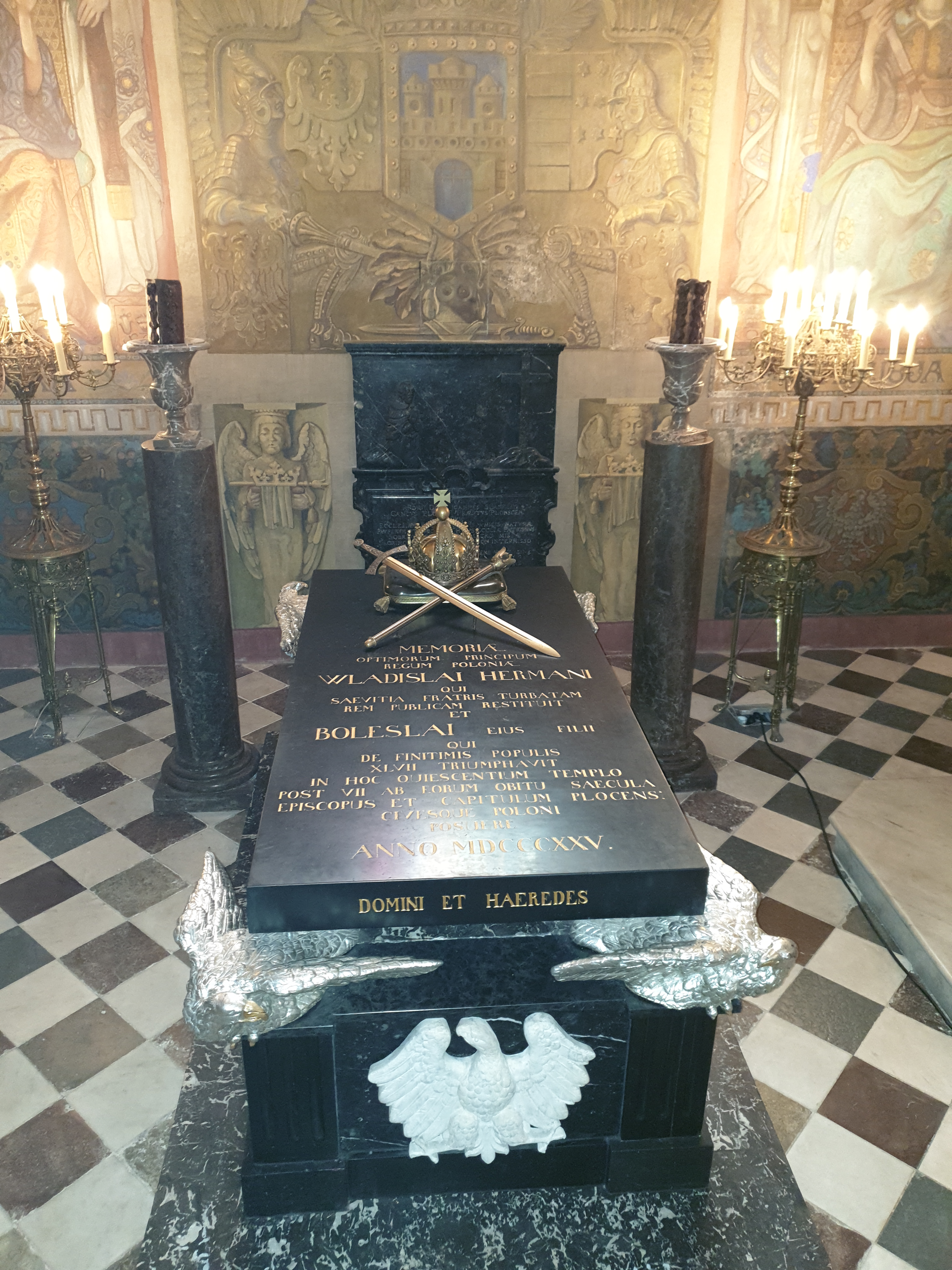
Tomb of Władysław I Herman of Poland

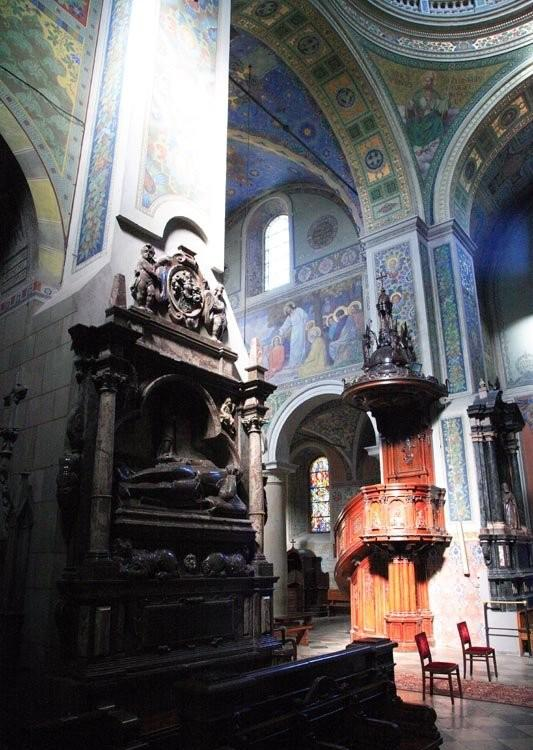
Interiors

== See also ==
- Płock Diadem
- Dukes of Masovia
