= Łatanice =

- Village
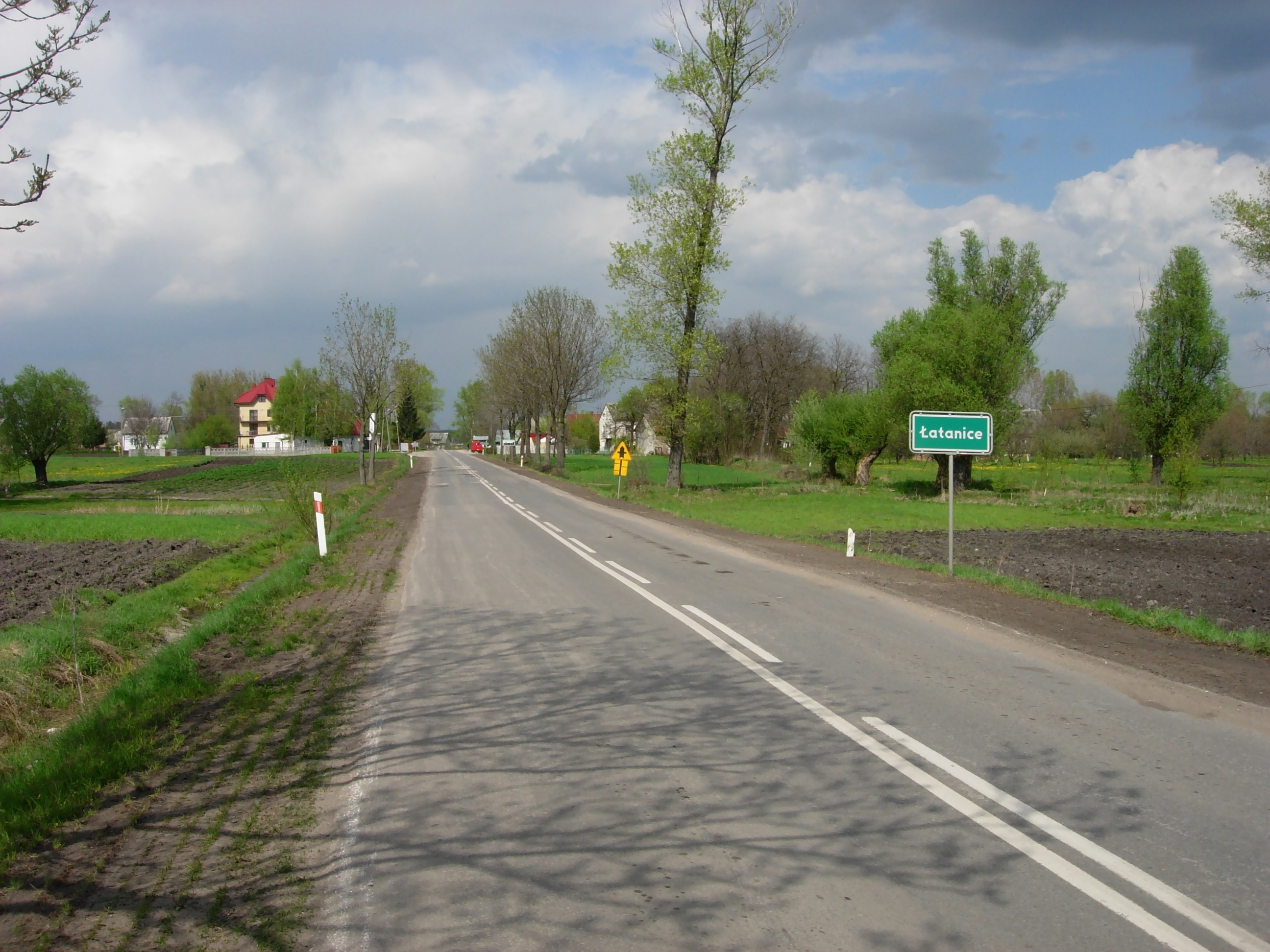

- Location within Poland
- Coordinates: 50°25′N 20°42′E
- Country: Poland
- Voivodeship: Świętokrzyskie
- County: Busko
- Gmina: Wiślica
- Population: 370

Łatanice [wataˈnit͡sɛ] is a village in the administrative district of Gmina Wiślica, within Busko County, Świętokrzyskie Voivodeship, in south-central Poland. It lies approximately 8 km (5 mi) north of Wiślica, 6 km (4 mi) south of Busko-Zdrój, and 53 km (33 mi) south of the regional capital Kielce.
