= Kobylniki =

Kobylniki may refer to the following places in Poland:

- Kobylniki, Góra County in Lower Silesian Voivodeship (south-west Poland)
- Kobylniki, Gmina Środa Śląska in Środa County, Lower Silesian Voivodeship (south-west Poland)
- Kobylniki, Poddębice County in Łódź Voivodeship (central Poland)
- Kobylniki, Sieradz County in Łódź Voivodeship (central Poland)
- Kobylniki, Busko County in Świętokrzyskie Voivodeship (south-central Poland)
- Kobylniki, Kazimierza County in Świętokrzyskie Voivodeship (south-central Poland)
- Kobylniki, Masovian Voivodeship (east-central Poland)
- Kobylniki, Gmina Grodzisk Wielkopolski in Greater Poland Voivodeship (west-central Poland)
- Kobylniki, Kościan County in Greater Poland Voivodeship (west-central Poland)
- Kobylniki, Poznań County in Greater Poland Voivodeship (west-central Poland)
- Kobylniki, Szamotuły County in Greater Poland Voivodeship (west-central Poland)

Kobylniki may refer to the following places in Belarus:

- Kobylniki, Minsk Region (central Belarus)
- Kobylniki, Vitebsk Region (north Belarus)
