= Hołudza =

- Village
- Location within Poland
- Coordinates: 50°25′0″N 20°43′4″E
- Country: Poland
- Voivodeship: Świętokrzyskie
- County: Busko
- Gmina: Wiślica

Hołudza [xɔˈwud͡za] is a village in the administrative district of Gmina Wiślica, within Busko County, Świętokrzyskie Voivodeship, in south-central Poland. It lies approximately 9 km (6 mi) north of Wiślica, 6 km (4 mi) south of Busko-Zdrój, and 53 km (33 mi) south of the regional capital Kielce.
