= Brzezie, Busko County =

Brzezie
- Village
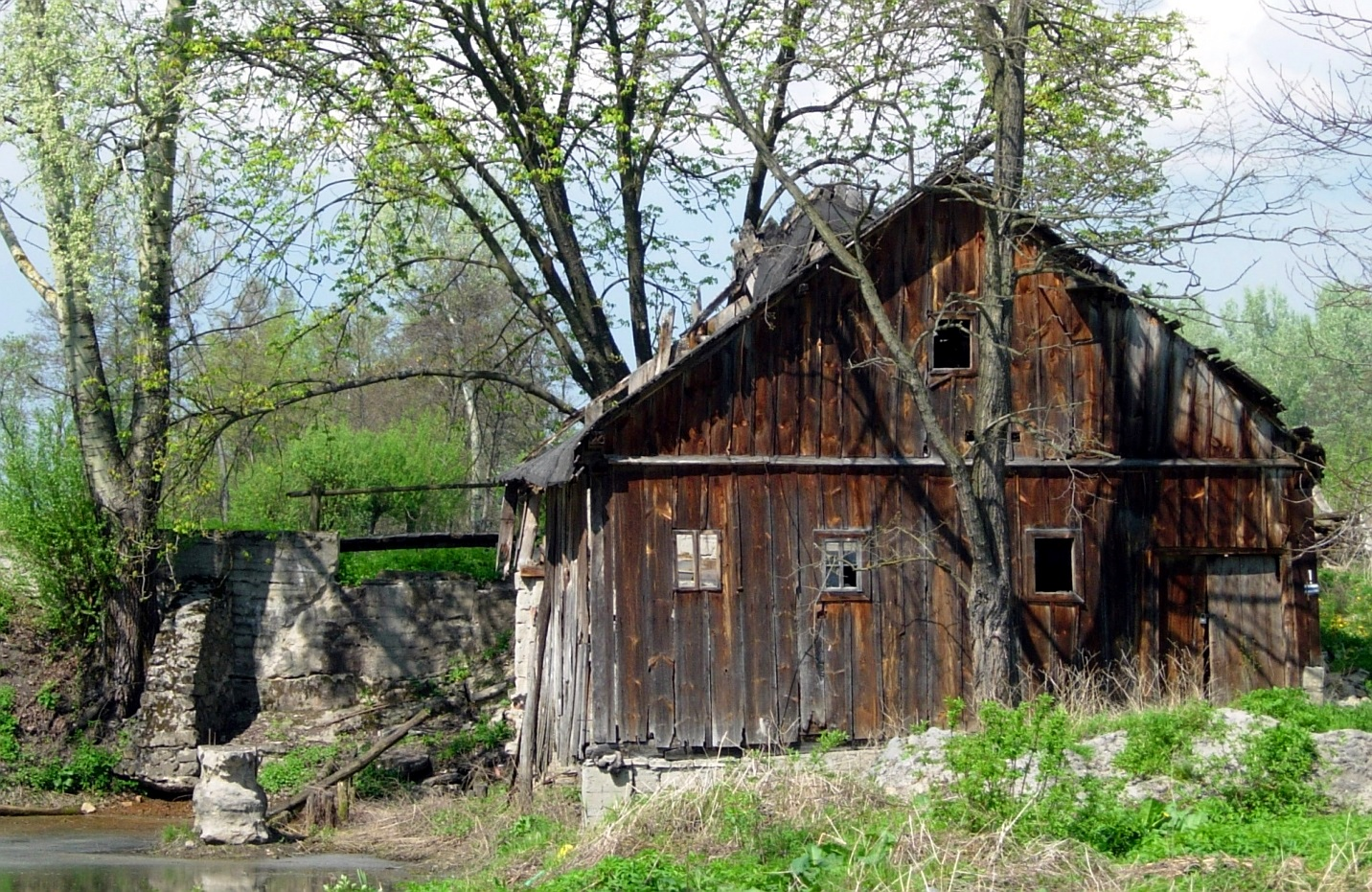

- Location within Poland
- Coordinates: 50°23′28″N 20°42′11″E
- Country: Poland
- Voivodeship: Świętokrzyskie
- County: Busko
- Gmina: Wiślica

Brzezie [ˈbʐɛʑɛ] is a village in the administrative district of Gmina Wiślica, within Busko County, Świętokrzyskie Voivodeship, in south-central Poland. It lies approximately 6 km (4 mi) north-east of Wiślica, 9 km (6 mi) south of Busko-Zdrój, and 55 km (34 mi) south of the regional capital Kielce.
