= Szczerbaków =

- Village
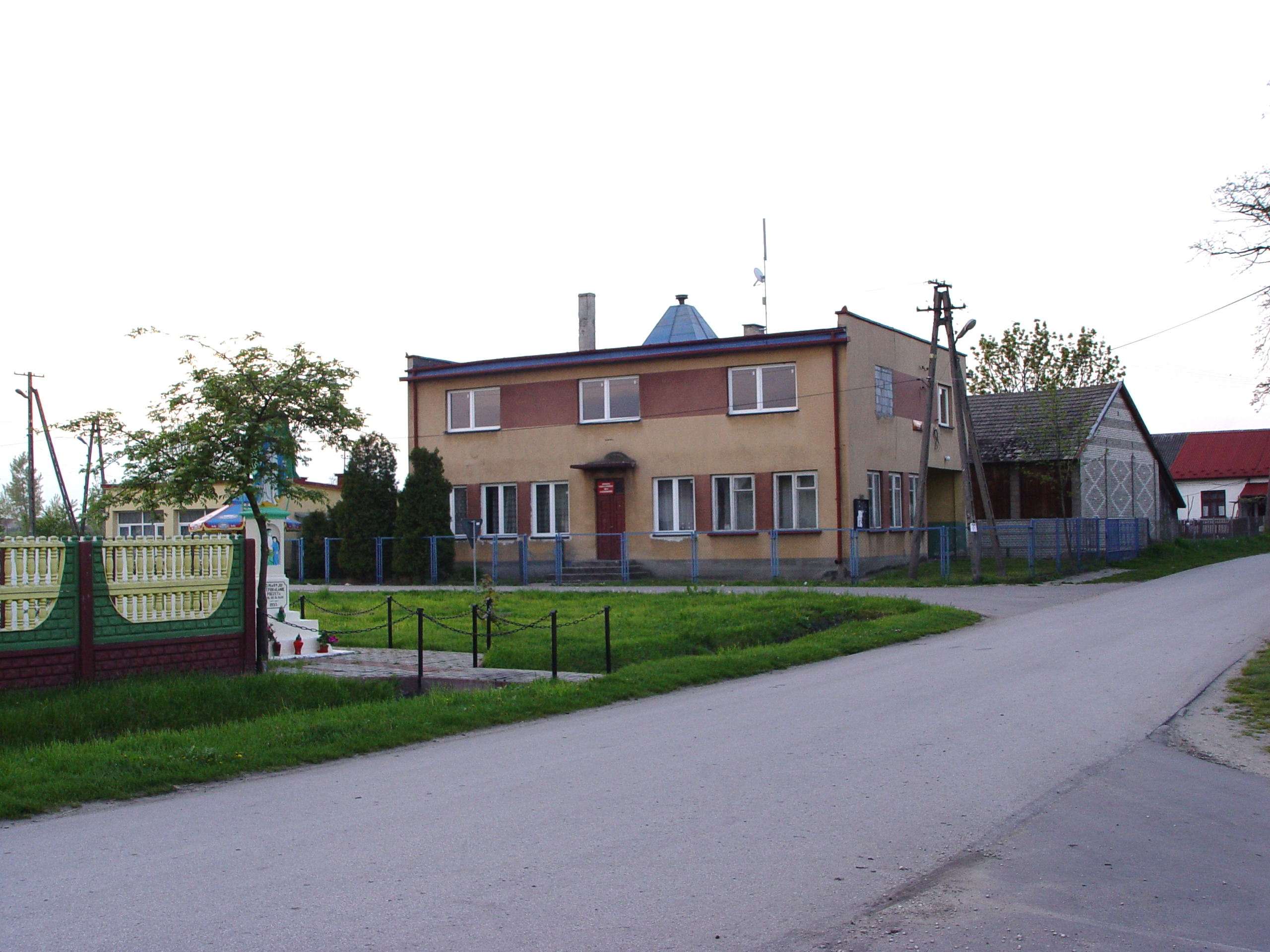

- Location within Poland
- Coordinates: 50°20′16″N 20°42′56″E
- Country: Poland
- Voivodeship: Świętokrzyskie
- County: Busko
- Gmina: Wiślica

Szczerbaków [ʂt͡ʂɛrˈbakuf] is a village in the administrative district of Gmina Wiślica, within Busko County, Świętokrzyskie Voivodeship, in south-central Poland. It lies approximately 4 km (2 mi) east of Wiślica, 15 km (9 mi) south of Busko-Zdrój, and 61 km (38 mi) south of the regional capital Kielce.
