= Nida Landscape Park =

Protected area in Poland

Coordinates: 50°25′N 20°35′E

- Nadnidziański Park Krajobrazowy
- IUCN category V (protected landscape/seascape)
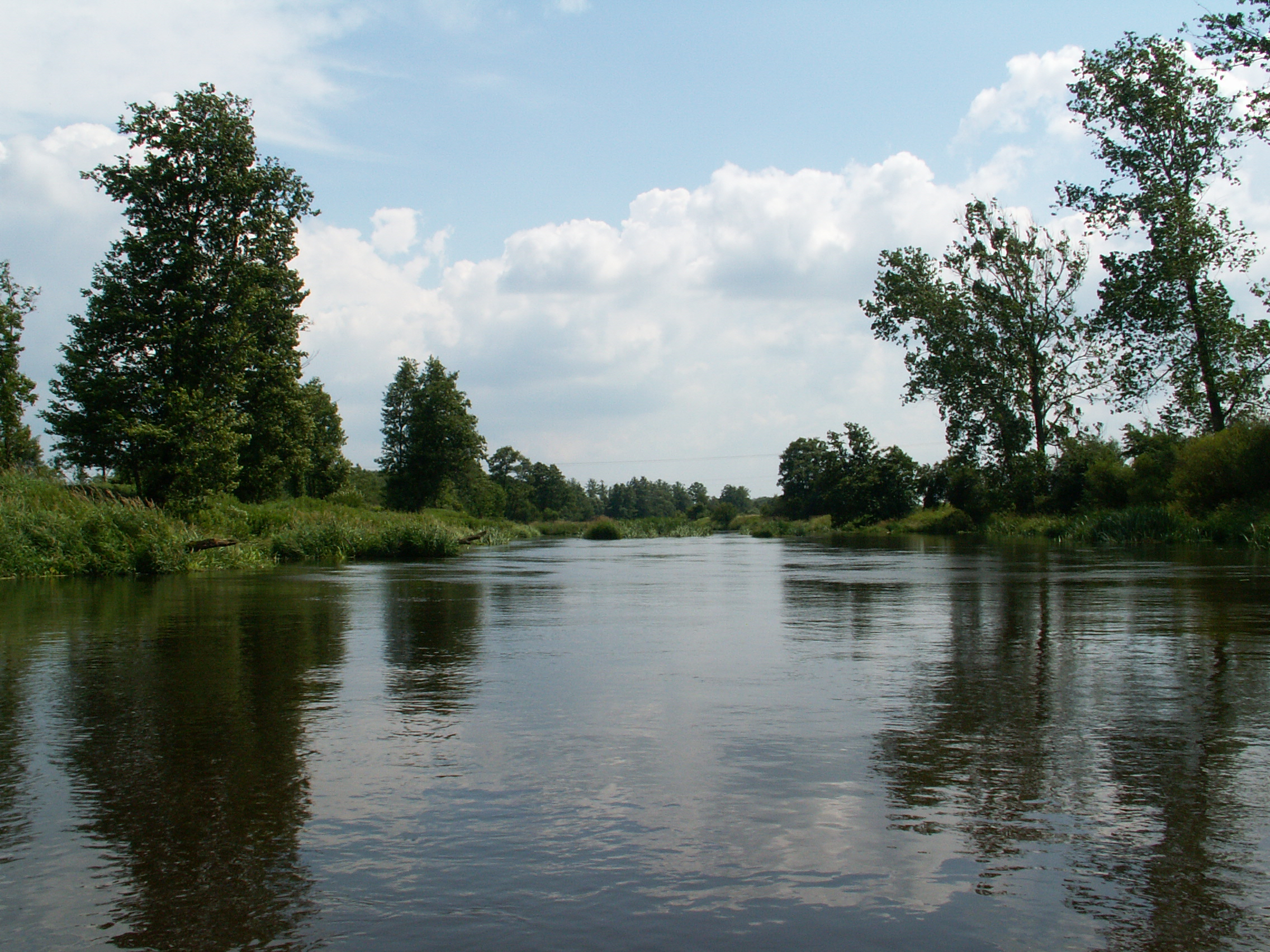
- Nida flowing through Landscape Park
- Interactive map of Nida Landscape Park
- Location: Świętokrzyskie Voivodeship
- Area: 231.64 km^{2} (89.44 sq mi)
- Established: 1986

Nida Landscape Park logo.

Nida Landscape Park (Nadnidziański Park Krajobrazowy) is a Polish Landscape Park designated protected area, located in Świętokrzyskie Voivodeship of south-central Poland. Within the Solec Basin, gypsum outcrops are common, forming rocky cliffs. Examples of karst formations include numerous caves, ponors, wywierzyski, karst lakes and rock gates. They are found in the vicinity of Gacek, Wiślica and Busk-Zdrój. There are karst gullies in Gorysławice. The karst forms found in Nadnidziański Park are unique in the country. Among the most valuable are large-crystalline (glassy) gypsums. The crystals of which they are composed reach a length of 3.5 meters.

== Geography ==
The park protects an area of 231.64 square kilometres (89.44 sq mi) on the banks of the Nida River. It was established in 1986, and is a Natura 2000 EU Special Protection Area.

Within the Landscape Park are ten nature reserves.

=== Counties and Gminas ===
The Park lies within Świętokrzyskie Voivodeship, in:

- Busko County — Gmina Busko-Zdrój, Gmina Nowy Korczyn, Gmina Wiślica
- Jędrzejów County — Gmina Imielno), Kazimierza County (Gmina Opatowiec
- Kielce County — Gmina Chmielnik
- Pińczów County — Gmina Pińczów, Gmina Kije, Gmina Michałów, Gmina Złota

== See also ==
- Landscape parks in Poland
- Special Protection Areas in Poland
- Natura 2000 in Poland
