= Jurków =

Jurków may refer to the following places in Poland:

- Jurków, Lower Silesian Voivodeship (south-west Poland)
- Jurków, Brzesko County in Lesser Poland Voivodeship (south Poland)
- Jurków, Limanowa County in Lesser Poland Voivodeship (south Poland)
- Jurków, Świętokrzyskie Voivodeship (south-central Poland)
