= Górki, Busko County =

Górki
- Village
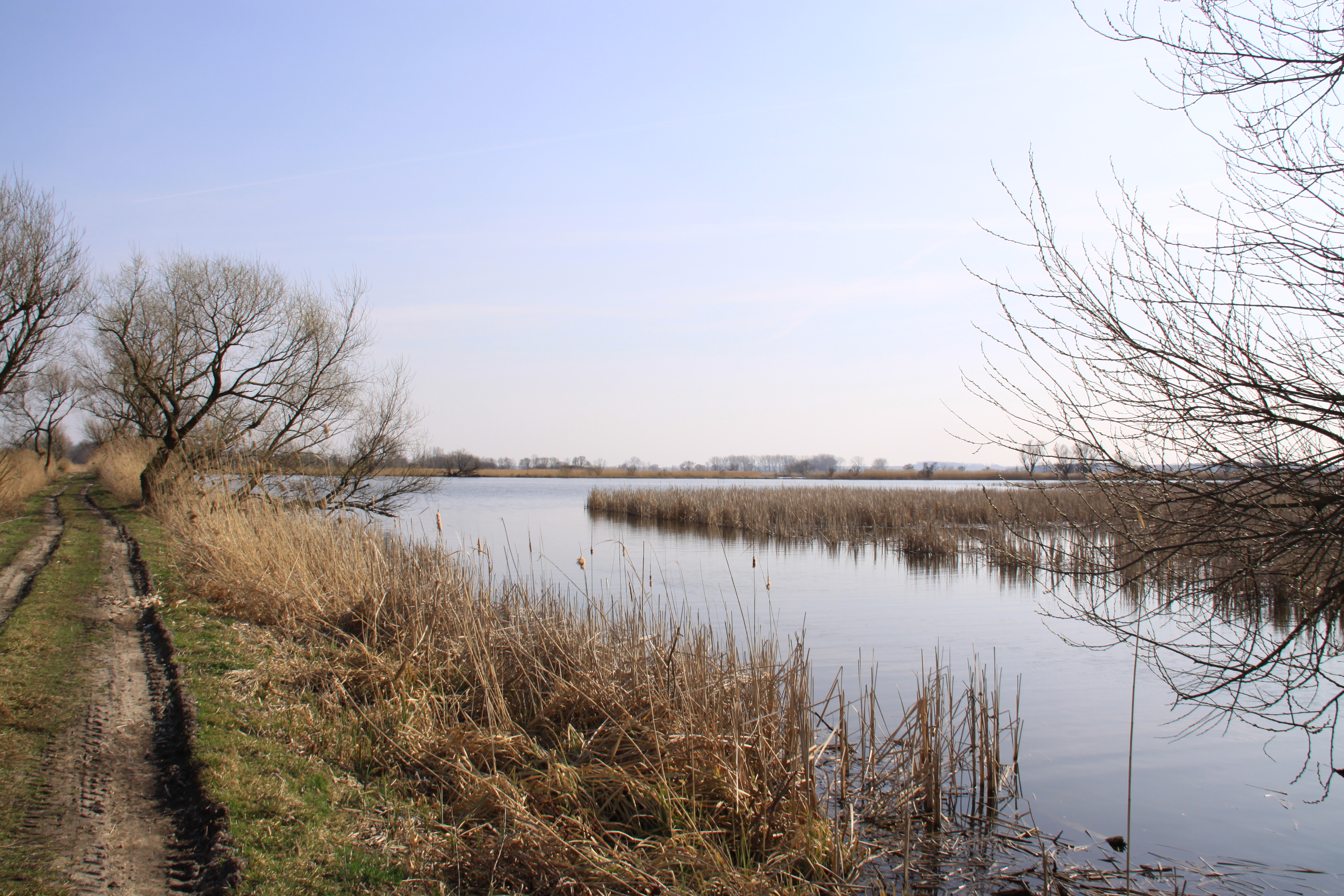

- Location within Poland
- Coordinates: 50°21′3″N 20°44′11″E
- Country: Poland
- Voivodeship: Świętokrzyskie
- County: Busko
- Gmina: Wiślica

Górki [ˈɡurki] is a village in the administrative district of Gmina Wiślica, within Busko County, Świętokrzyskie Voivodeship, in south-central Poland. It lies approximately 5 km (3 mi) east of Wiślica, 13 km (8 mi) south of Busko-Zdrój, and 60 km (37 mi) south of the regional capital Kielce.
