= Skotniki Górne =

- Village
- Location within Poland
- Coordinates: 50°25′25″N 20°38′17″E
- Country: Poland
- Voivodeship: Świętokrzyskie
- County: Busko
- Gmina: Wiślica

Skotniki Górne [skɔtˈniki ˈɡurnɛ] is a village in the administrative district of Gmina Wiślica, within Busko County, Świętokrzyskie Voivodeship, in south-central Poland. It lies approximately 9 km (6 mi) north of Wiślica, 8 km (5 mi) south-west of Busko-Zdrój, and 52 km (32 mi) south of the regional capital Kielce.
