= Kuchary, Gmina Wiślica =

Kuchary
- Village
- Location within Poland
- Coordinates: 50°19′53″N 20°39′49″E
- Country: Poland
- Voivodeship: Świętokrzyskie
- County: Busko
- Gmina: Wiślica

Kuchary [kuˈxarɨ] is a village in the administrative district of Gmina Wiślica, within Busko County, Świętokrzyskie Voivodeship, in south-central Poland. It lies approximately 2 km (1 mi) south-west of Wiślica, 16 km (10 mi) south of Busko-Zdrój, and 62 km (39 mi) south of the regional capital Kielce.
