= Gunter Prus =

Polish bishop

Gunter Prus was Bishop of Płock in 1223 and again from 1227 to 1232. Born into the Prus noble family, he was Canon and Dean of Płock. Following the death of Bishop Gedko Sasinowic, he contended – supported by Duke Konrad I of Masovia – for the bishop's throne against his rival Jan Gozdawita who died in 1227. His episcopacy saw him oppose the Teutonic Knights encourage Duke Konrad, recall the Teutonic Knights to Polish lands and militarily oppose the neighbouring, pagan Old Prussians who were pillaging and slaving in Polish territory at the time. He died in 1232 in Vienna on a diplomatic mission, and he was buried in Rome.

Religious titles
| Preceded by Jan Gozdawita | Bishop of Płock; 1227-1232 | Succeeded by Piotr I Półkozic |
