= Koniecmosty =

- Village
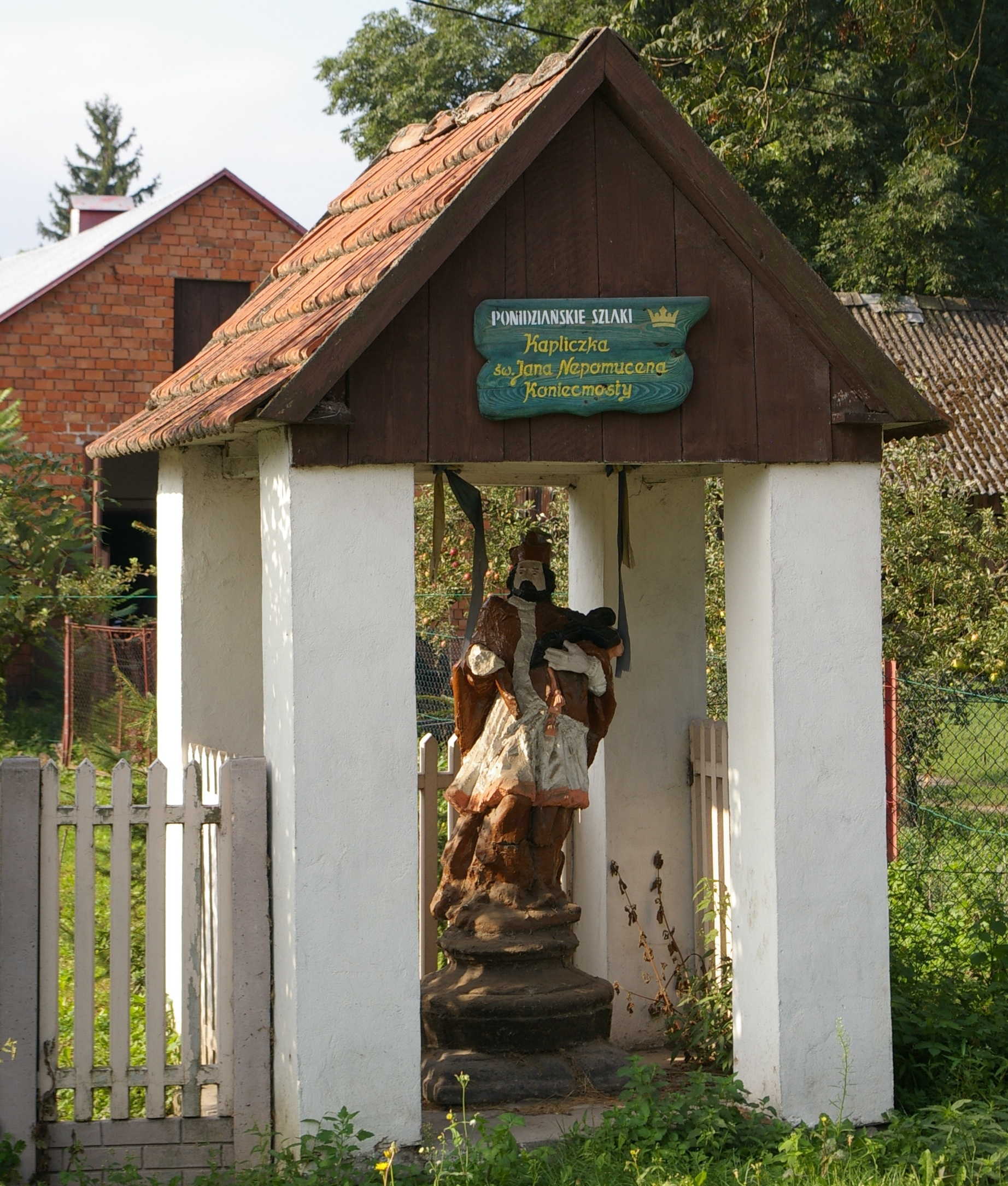

- Location within Poland
- Coordinates: 50°20′13″N 20°39′38″E
- Country: Poland
- Voivodeship: Świętokrzyskie
- County: Busko
- Gmina: Wiślica

Koniecmosty [kɔɲɛt͡sˈmɔstɨ] is a village in the administrative district of Gmina Wiślica, within Busko County, Świętokrzyskie Voivodeship, in south-central Poland. It lies approximately 2 km (1 mi) south-west of Wiślica, 15 km (9 mi) south of Busko-Zdrój, and 61 km (38 mi) south of the regional capital Kielce.

== See also ==
- The Lesser Polish Way
