= Długosz House (Wiślica) =

Gothic structure in Wiślica, Poland

Długosz House in Wiślica
- Dom Długosza w Wiślicy
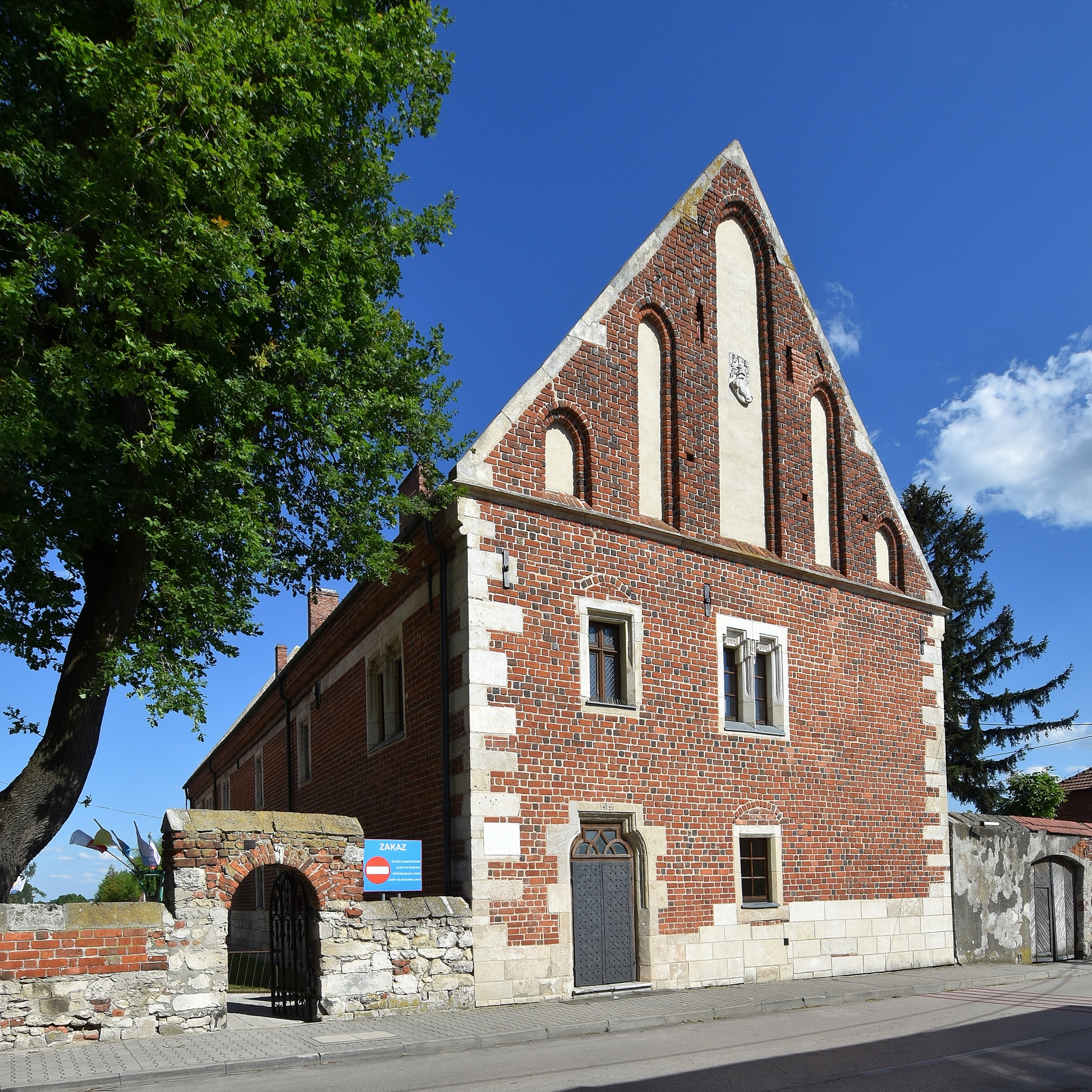

General information
- Location: Wiślica, Poland
- Coordinates: 50°20′55″N 20°40′24″E
- Year built: 1460

Design and construction
- Designations: Register of monuments

The Długosz House is a 15th century gothic residential structure in Wiślica, Poland. It was one of several similar structures sponsored by Jan Długosz throughout the Kingdom of Poland. It is a registered monument in Poland.

== Description ==
Jan Długosz funded the construction of the structure in 1460 and intended it to house clergy of the local collegiate church. Długosz demolished older houses on the site to make room for the new building, a gothic structure of brick, ashlar, and timber beams. Ornamental paintings were also added to the interior, including a depiction of Długosz himself. According to historian Michał Bobrzyński, the local clergy were grateful for the "magnificent" new residence.

The structure is a museum in the modern period.

== Gallery ==
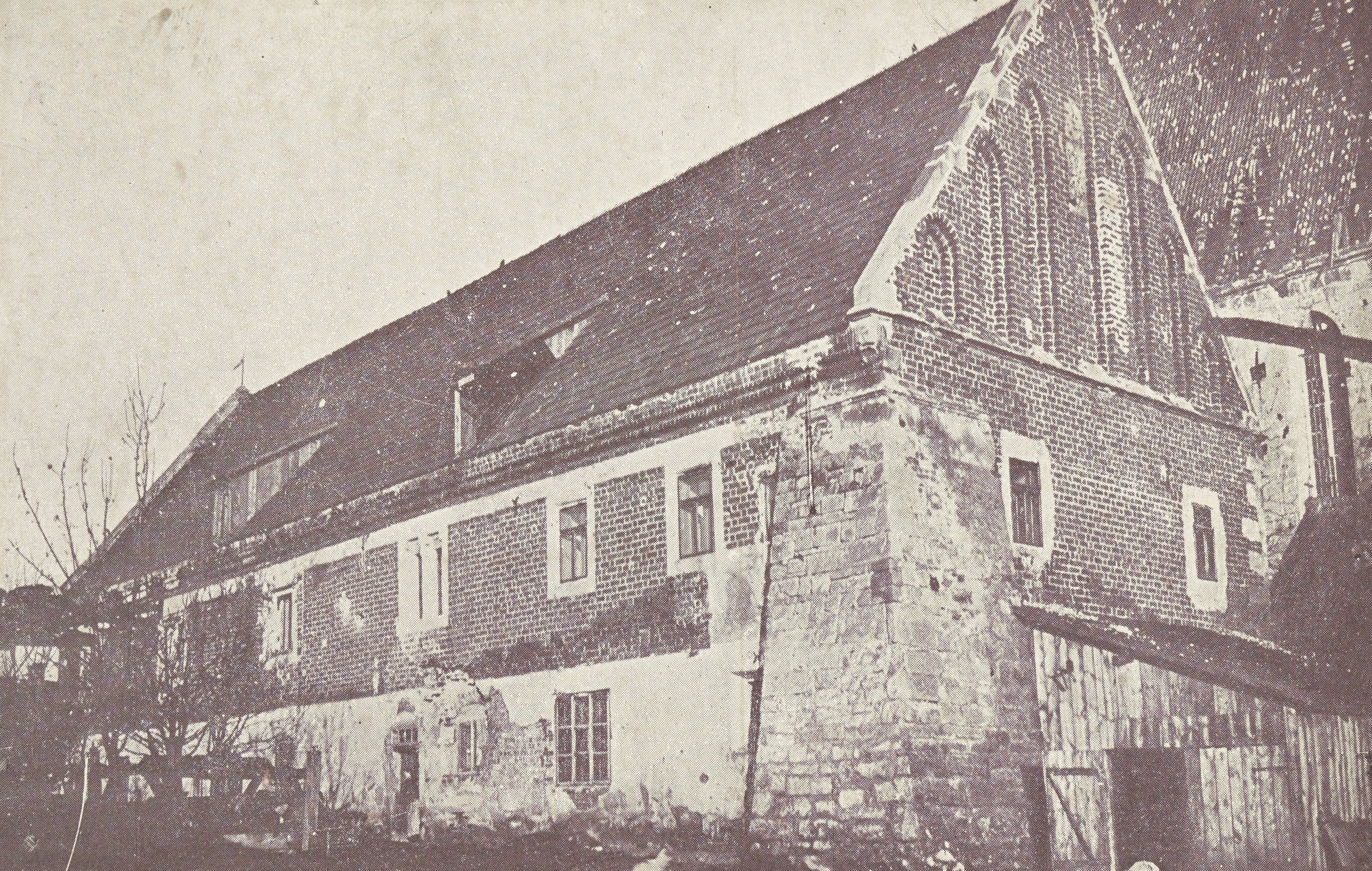
The house in 1915

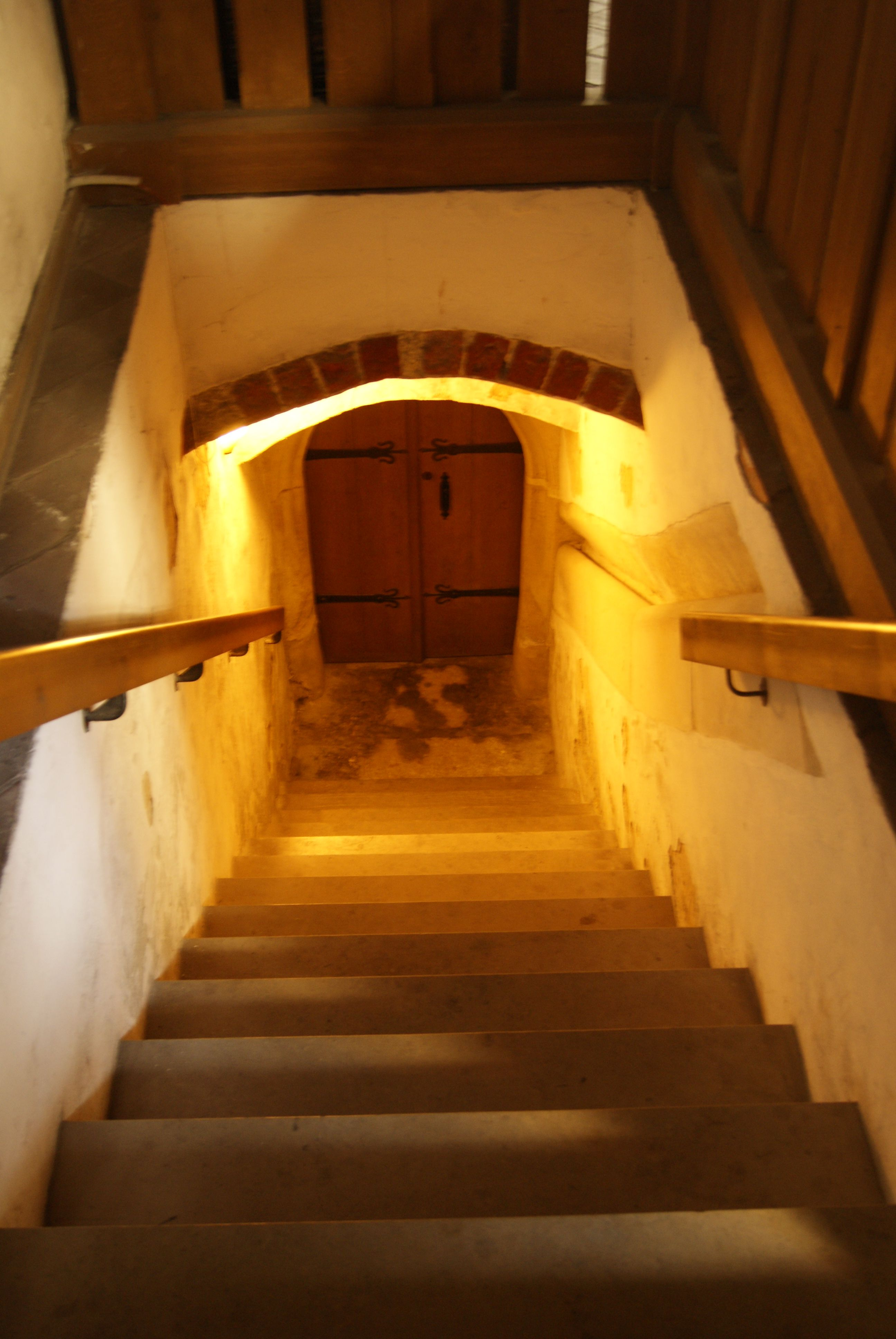
Interior staircase

== See also ==
- Długosz House in Sandomierz
- Długosz House in Krakow
