= Sielec, Busko County =

Sielec
- Village
- Location within Poland
- Coordinates: 50°22′2″N 20°39′36″E
- Country: Poland
- Voivodeship: Świętokrzyskie
- County: Busko
- Gmina: Wiślica

Sielec [ˈɕɛlɛt͡s] is a village in the administrative district of Gmina Wiślica, within Busko County, Świętokrzyskie Voivodeship, in south-central Poland. It lies approximately 3 km (2 mi) north-west of Wiślica, 12 km (7 mi) south of Busko-Zdrój, and 58 km (36 mi) south of the regional capital Kielce.
