= Skotniki Dolne =

- Village
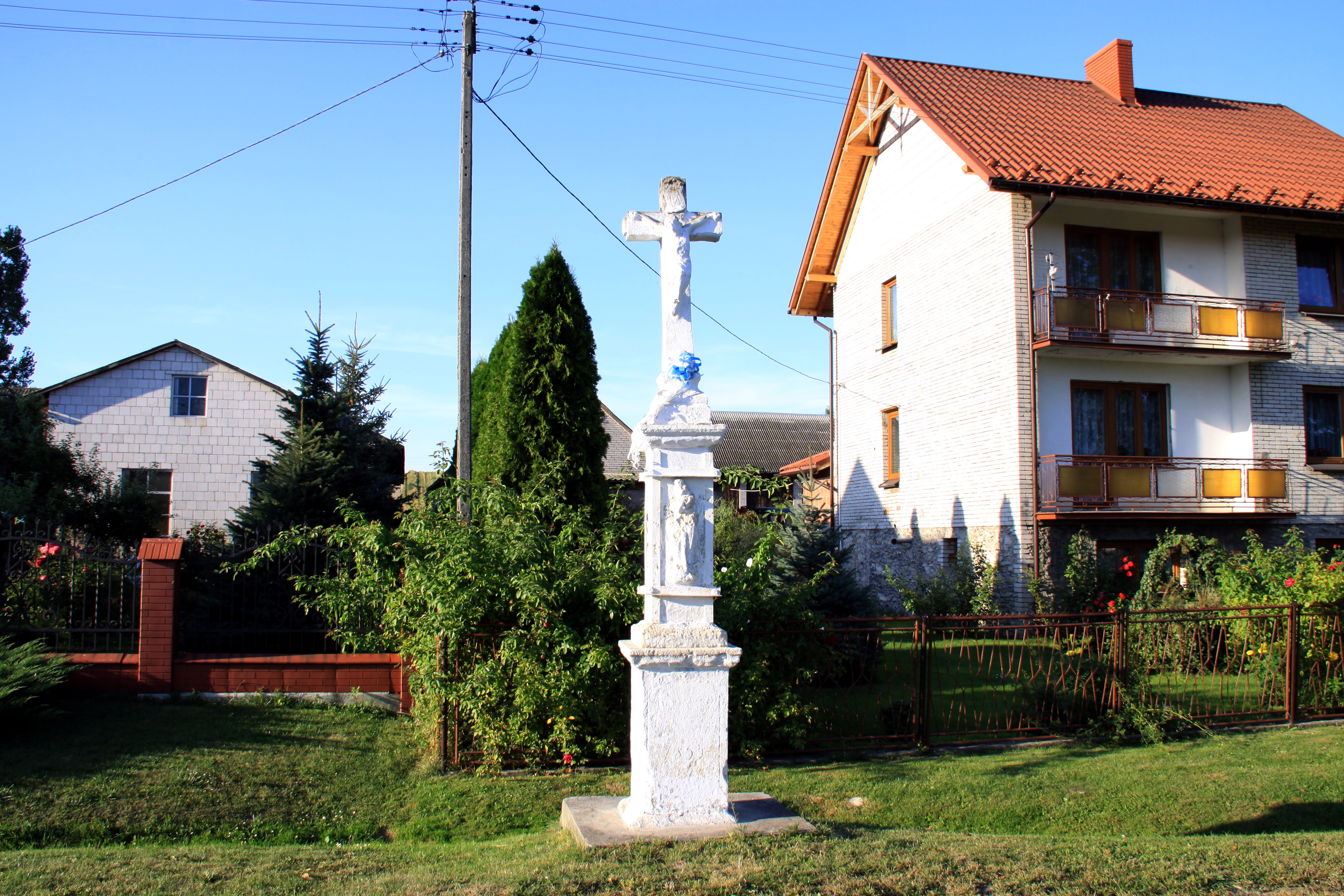

- Location within Poland
- Coordinates: 50°24′41″N 20°38′25″E
- Country: Poland
- Voivodeship: Świętokrzyskie
- County: Busko
- Gmina: Wiślica

Skotniki Dolne [skɔtˈniki ˈdɔlnɛ] is a village in the administrative district of Gmina Wiślica, within Busko County, Świętokrzyskie Voivodeship, in south-central Poland. It lies approximately 8 km (5 mi) north of Wiślica, 9 km (6 mi) south-west of Busko-Zdrój, and 53 km (33 mi) south of the regional capital Kielce.
