= Ostrów, Busko County =

Ostrów
- Village
- Location within Poland
- Coordinates: 50°19′5″N 20°40′25″E
- Country: Poland
- Voivodeship: Świętokrzyskie
- County: Busko
- Gmina: Wiślica

Ostrów [ˈɔstruf] is a village in the administrative district of Gmina Wiślica, within Busko County, Świętokrzyskie Voivodeship, in south-central Poland. It lies approximately 4 km (2 mi) south of Wiślica, 17 km (11 mi) south of Busko-Zdrój, and 63 km (39 mi) south of the regional capital Kielce.
