= Szczytniki, Gmina Wiślica =

Szczytniki
- Village
- Location within Poland
- Coordinates: 50°19′12″N 20°42′50″E
- Country: Poland
- Voivodeship: Świętokrzyskie
- County: Busko
- Gmina: Wiślica
- Population (approx.): 350

Szczytniki [ʂt͡ʂɨtˈniki] is a village in the administrative district of Gmina Wiślica, within Busko County, Świętokrzyskie Voivodeship, in south-central Poland. It lies approximately 5 km (3 mi) south-east of Wiślica, 17 km (11 mi) south of Busko-Zdrój, and 63 km (39 mi) south of the regional capital Kielce.
