= Skorocice =

- Village
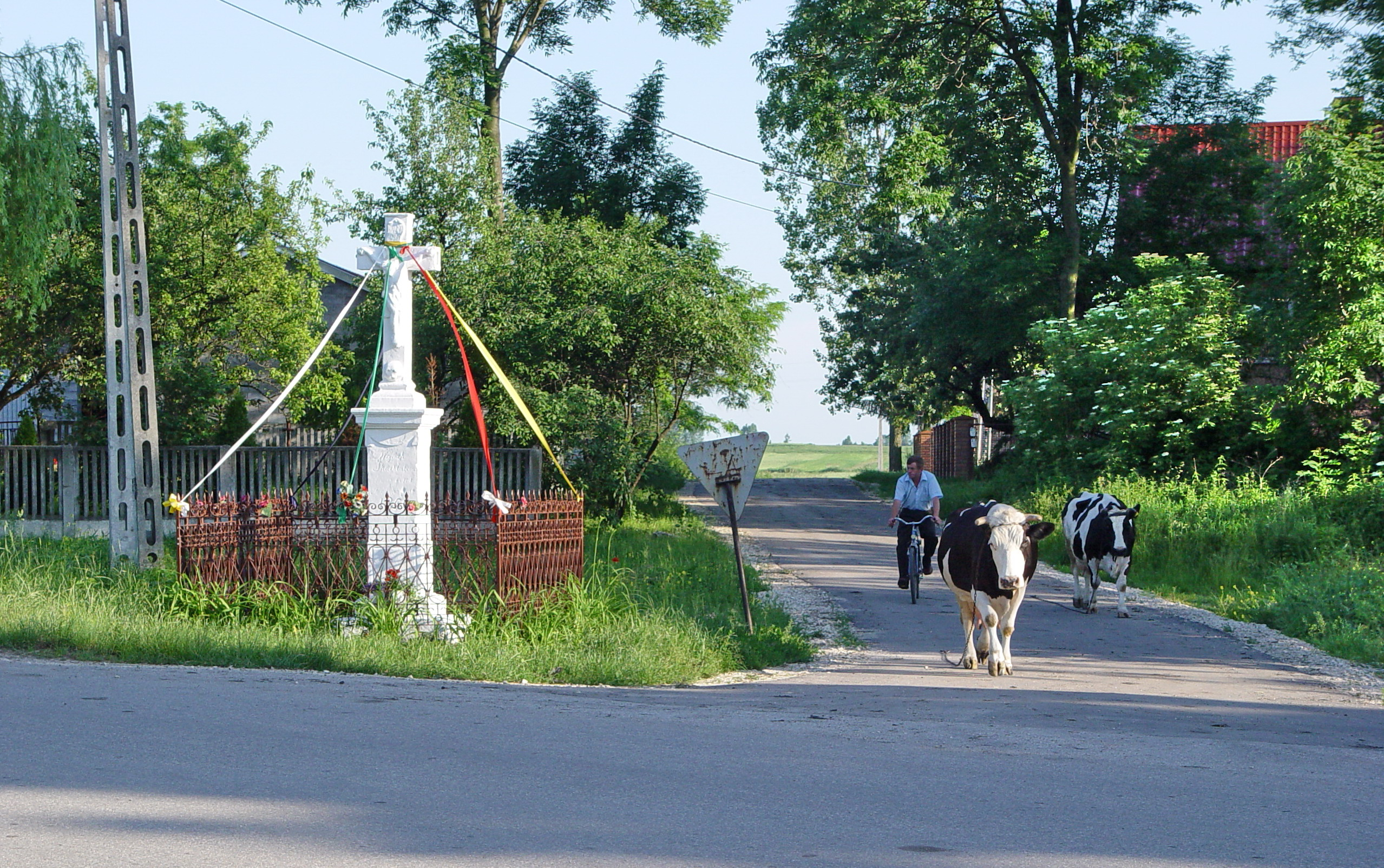

- Location within Poland
- Coordinates: 50°24′N 20°39′E
- Country: Poland
- Voivodeship: Świętokrzyskie
- County: Busko
- Gmina: Wiślica

Skorocice [skɔrɔˈt͡ɕit͡sɛ] is a village in the administrative district of Gmina Wiślica, within Busko County, Świętokrzyskie Voivodeship, in south-central Poland. It lies approximately 7 km (4 mi) north of Wiślica, 9 km (6 mi) south-west of Busko-Zdrój, and 54 km (34 mi) south of the regional capital Kielce.
