= Wit z Chotela =

12th-century Polish Catholic bishop

Wit z Chotela also known as Vitus was a twelfth-century Bishop of Płock in Poland and founder of several monasteries.

== Personal life ==
He was born in Chotel Czerwony, Poland, to the Janina noble family and like most senior clerics of his day he was younger son of a local baron, his brother Dzierżko inheriting the family estates. Historian Jan Długosz describes him as well educated, humble and pious.

His brother was Dzierżko, comes, who around 1190 gave his property to the closter of Premonstratensians in Busko.

== Career ==
Wit was bishop from about 1180 and belonged to a group of clerics associated with the Duke Casimir the Just.

Towards the later quarter of the twelfth century, bishop Wit and his brother Dzierżko founded three monasteries. One of these, located just north of Wiślica Busko, was endowed with ten neighbouring villages. Among the foundation documents of this monastery is a testament of Dzierżko written about 1190, the first of its type in Poland, where the Knight Dzierżko in venturing forth on the Third Crusade entrusted his wife to the monastery.

Wit also founded a number of Norbertine monasteries, including one in Busko, and Witów and together with the governor Mazowieckie Żyron founded a convent in Płock.

Wit also founded several parish churches, including the Mary Magdalene church in Pułtusk, the church of Saint Szczepana w Bądkowie in the town of Bądkowo, built in 1190, and also the church of Saint Bartholomew in his home town.

Religious titles
Preceded by Lupus Godzięba	Bishop of Płock; 1187 – 1206	Succeeded by Gedko Sasinowic
