= Gorysławice =

- Village
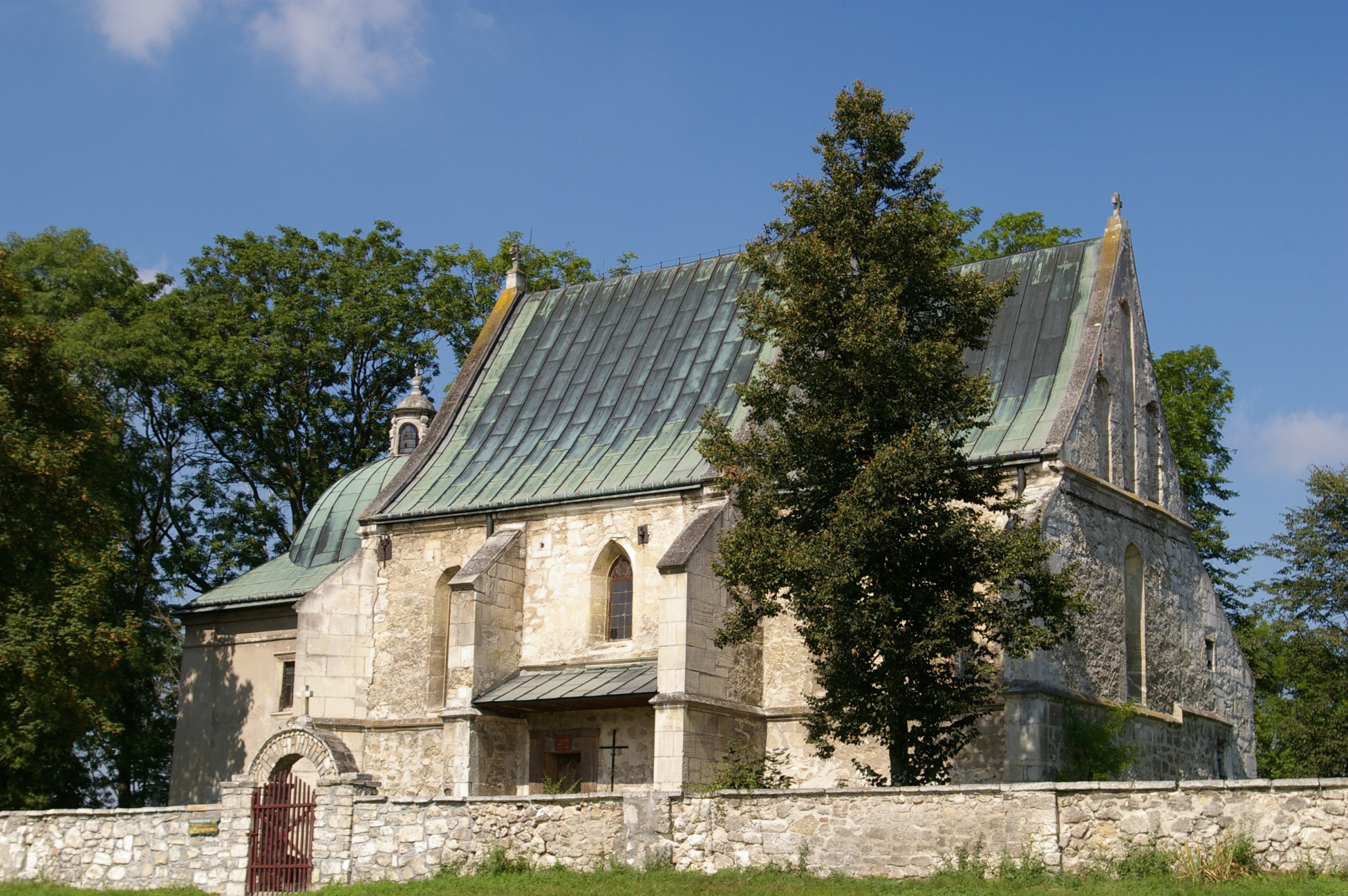
- Catholic church

- Location within Poland
- Coordinates: 50°21′19″N 20°41′4″E
- Country: Poland
- Voivodeship: Świętokrzyskie
- County: Busko
- Gmina: Wiślica

Gorysławice [ɡɔrɨswaˈvit͡sɛ] is a village in the administrative district of Gmina Wiślica, within Busko County, Świętokrzyskie Voivodeship, in south-central Poland. It lies approximately 2 km (1 mi) north-east of Wiślica, 13 km (8 mi) south of Busko-Zdrój, and 59 km (37 mi) south of the regional capital Kielce.
