= Chotel Czerwony =

- Village
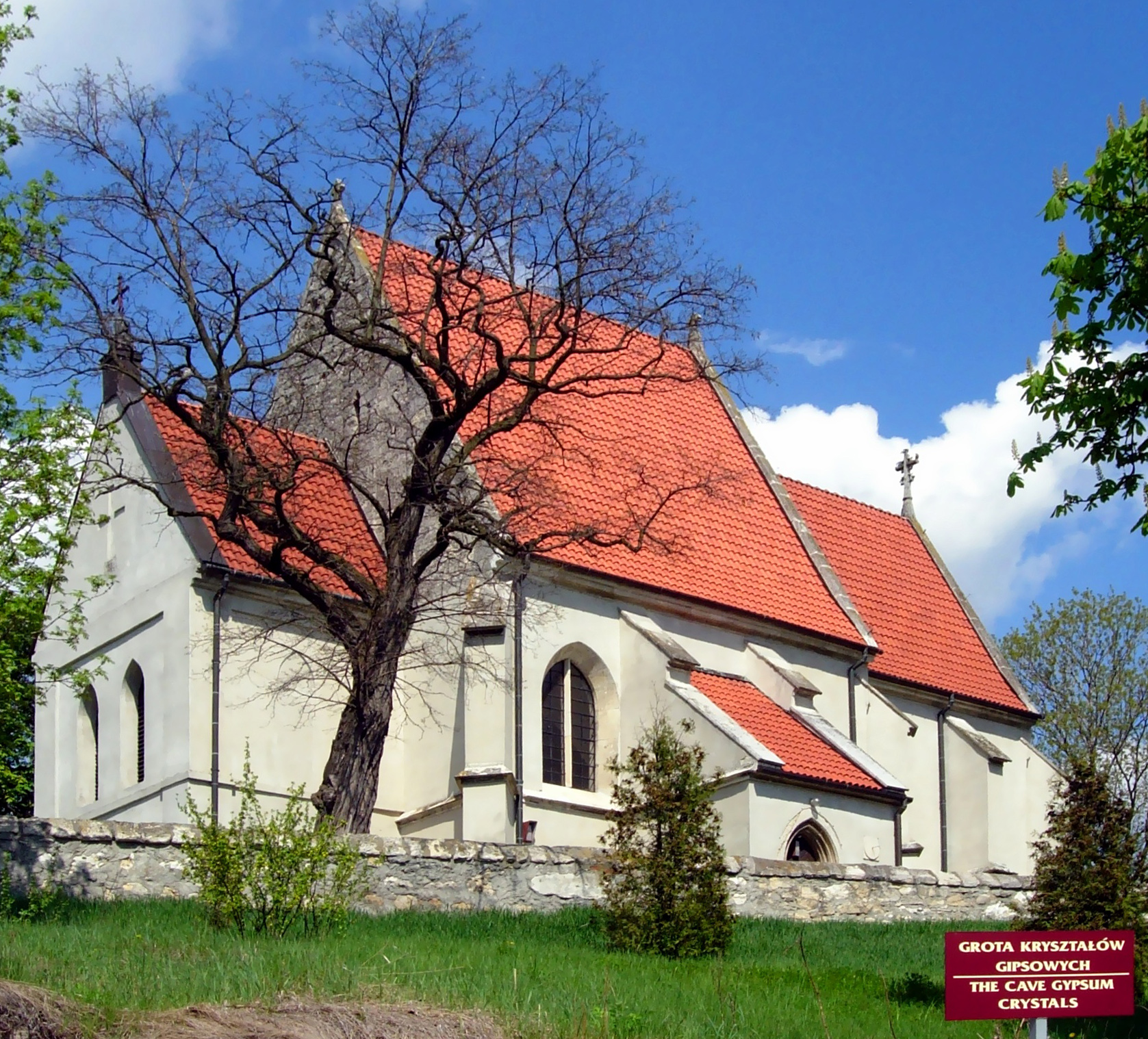
- Church in the village

- Location within Poland
- Coordinates: 50°22′41″N 20°42′27″E
- Country: Poland
- Voivodeship: Świętokrzyskie
- County: Busko
- Gmina: Wiślica

Chotel Czerwony [ˈxɔtɛl t͡ʂɛrˈvɔnɨ] is a village in the administrative district of Gmina Wiślica, within Busko County, Świętokrzyskie Voivodeship, in south-central Poland. It lies approximately 5 km (3 mi) north-east of Wiślica, 10 km (6 mi) south of Busko-Zdrój, and 57 km (35 mi) south of the regional capital Kielce.

It is notable for its Gothic church of St. Bartholomew funded by Jan Długosz and built in the mid 15th century.

== See also ==
- The Lesser Polish Way
