= Collegiate Basilica of the Birth of the Blessed Virgin Mary, Wiślica =

Gothic church in Wiślica, Poland

Coordinates: 50°20′56″N 20°40′26″E

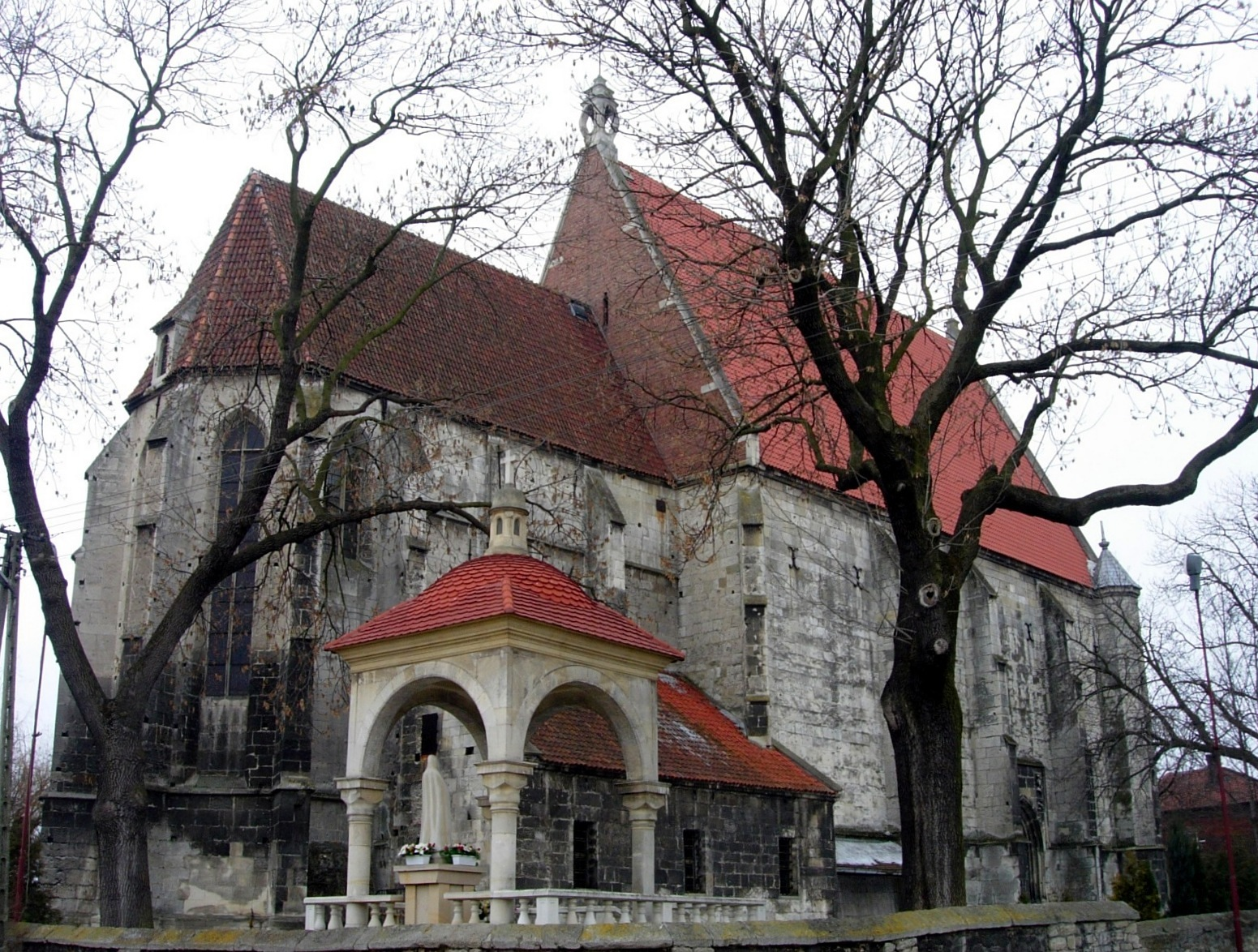
Collegiate church in Wiślica

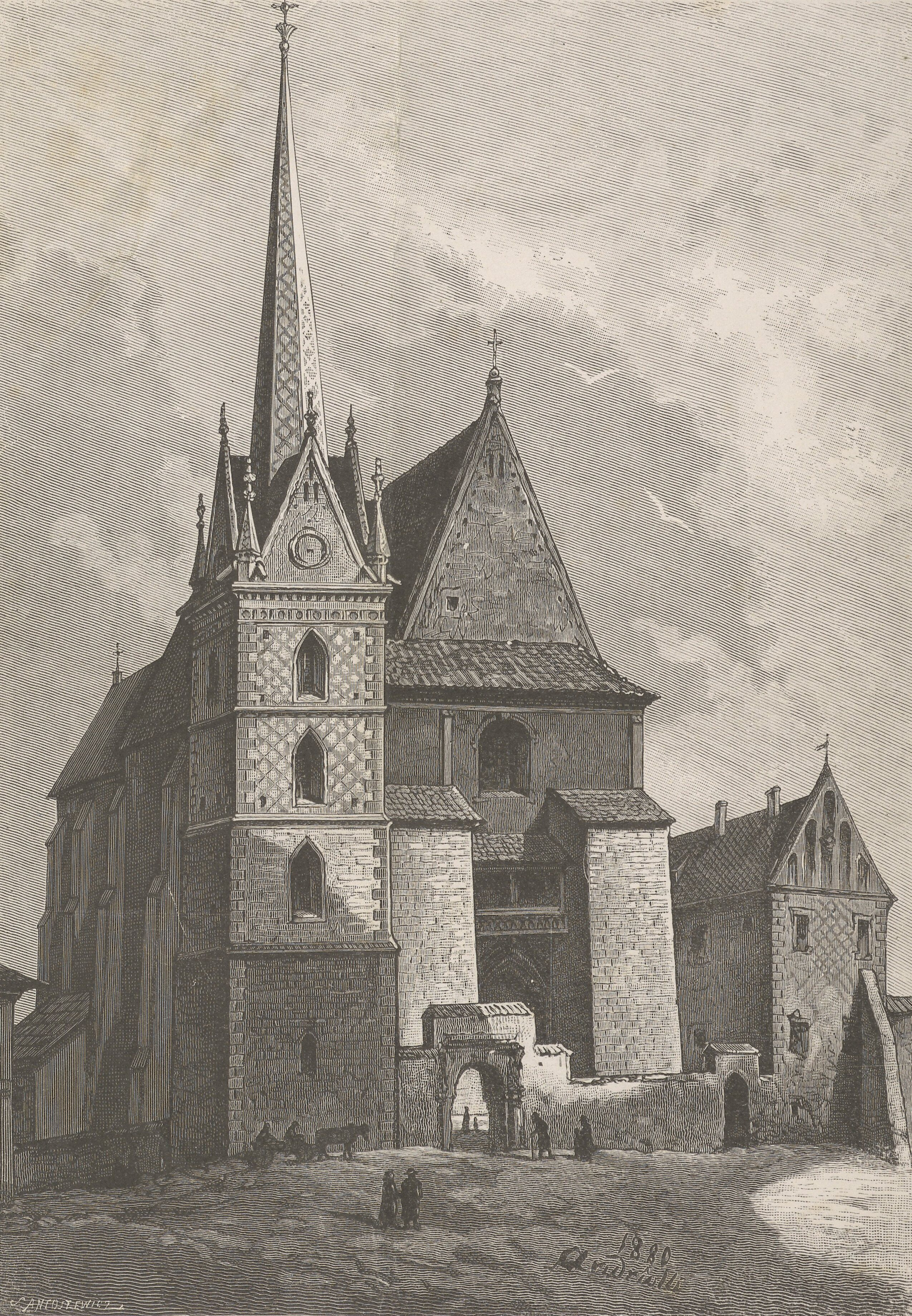
The church in Wiślica at the end of the 19th century

The Collegiate church in Wiślica (full name: Collegiate Basilica of the Birth of the Blessed Virgin Mary in Wiślica, Polish: Bazylika kolegiacka Narodzenia Najświętszej Marii Panny w Wiślicy) is a Gothic church, erected in 1350 in the southern Polish town of Wiślica, during the reign of King Casimir III of Poland. It was built on foundations of two earlier Romanesque churches, of which remains have been preserved in the crypt.

Since September 8, 2005, it has been designated a Minor Basilica.

== Origins ==
=== Romanesque collegiate church ===
Construction of the first Romanesque collegiate church in Wiślica, the town which in the early Middle Ages was one of the biggest administrative centers of southern Poland, was initiated by Prince Henry of Sandomierz in the mid-12th century, and finished in the second half of the 12th century by his brother, Casimir II the Just. After completion, it was a small, one-nave building, with a small apse. In western part of the nave, there was a gallery or choir loft and under the presbytery, there was a crypt, whose remains still can be found. The crypt was supported by four columns.

At the beginning of the 13th century, a larger Collegiate Church of the Holy Trinity was built. It consisted of three naves, the outer two with side-chapels. The vault was supported by six pillars, and there were two towers on the western facade. It is probable that since the mid-12th century, the church was the center of a chapter, which was overseen by the bishops of Kraków. However, the earliest remaining documents confirming the existence of the chapter come from the mid-13th century.

=== Gothic collegiate church ===
The third and present church was built for King Casimir III. It was one of several churches built by the ruler of Poland as atonement for his murder of the vicar of Wawel Cathedral, Marcin Baryczka. Under King Ladislaus II Jagiello (1386–1434) the collegiate church in Wiślica was adorned in frescoes, which have come down to us in a very poor condition. They were covered with plaster already at the turn of the 17th century and were discovered during World War I. The collegiate church was damaged and then rebuilt several times. In 1598 its roof and clock were renewed, confessionals were added and a sculpture of the Madonna was replaced. In 1678, a general remodeling of the church was carried out at the expense of 6,000 zlotys. Four years later, a hailstorm destroyed the roof.

In the late 18th century, the village of Wiślica became part of the Austrian Empire in the Partitions of Poland then, after the Napoleonic Wars, it was annexed by the Russian Empire until after World War I.

In 1915, the church was seriously damaged by Austrian artillery during skirmishes with the Russian Army. The Western facade was destroyed, together with the 13th century towers. After the war, when Wiślica became part of the Second Polish Republic, the damage was repaired with help of Professor Adolf Szyszko-Bohusz, a renowned architect of the Jagiellonian University. On September 7, 1924, the church regained the status of a collegiate church, which had been lost back in 1819.

== Architecture ==
The church is made of stone, with the exception of the western facade which was destroyed in 1915 and rebuilt in brick. At the northern wall there is an annex, built in the second half of the 17th century, with a sacristy. In the anteroom, there is a characteristic portal and the door inside is adorned with a 15th-century rosette. Above the portal, there is a low relief commemorating King Casimir III and Jan Bodzanta, Bishop of Kraków. It was funded in 1464, on the initiative of Jan Długosz, who in mid-15th century was a canon in Wiślica. The Northern portal was built in the second half of the 14th century, with several eagles and coats of arms of Polish provinces. Nearby, there is a blind window, out of which, according to a legend, the Wiślica Statutes were announced in 1347. The vault in the nave is partly ribbed, supported with three pillars. In several places on the vault there are coats of arms of parts of the Kingdom of Poland during the reign of Casimir III: Greater Poland, Ruthenia, Land of Sieradz, Land of Leczyca, and Dobrzyń Land. There are also Evangelist symbols and the head of Jesus. In the presbytery, there are the remains of several post-Byzantine wall paintings, made by Master Hail, an Orthodox painter from Przemyśl between 1397 and 1400.

On the altar, there is a sculpture of the Madonna of Łokietek, which dates to around 1300. According to legend, King Wladyslaw the Elbow-high prayed there for unity of the country. Also, Queen Jadwiga of Poland supposedly prayed there with her husband, King Jogaila.

In the cellar of the church, there is a unique Romanesque figurative floor, with different persons and animals carved on it. The floor, which measures 4 by 2.5 meters, comes from around 1170 and was discovered in 1959.

Near the church there is a small museum, which depicts Wiślica's history as one of Poland's medieval settlements.

Historical views

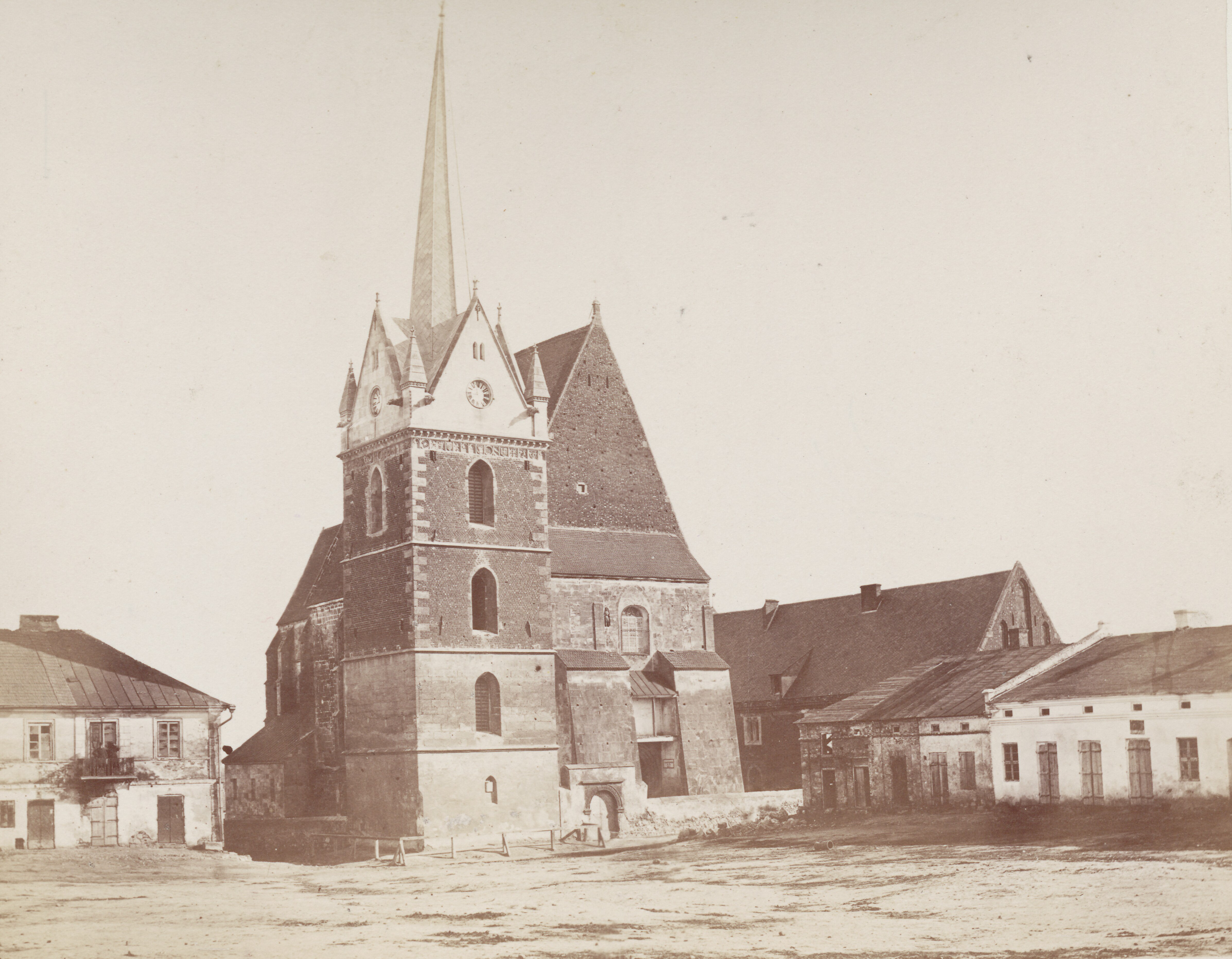
1885

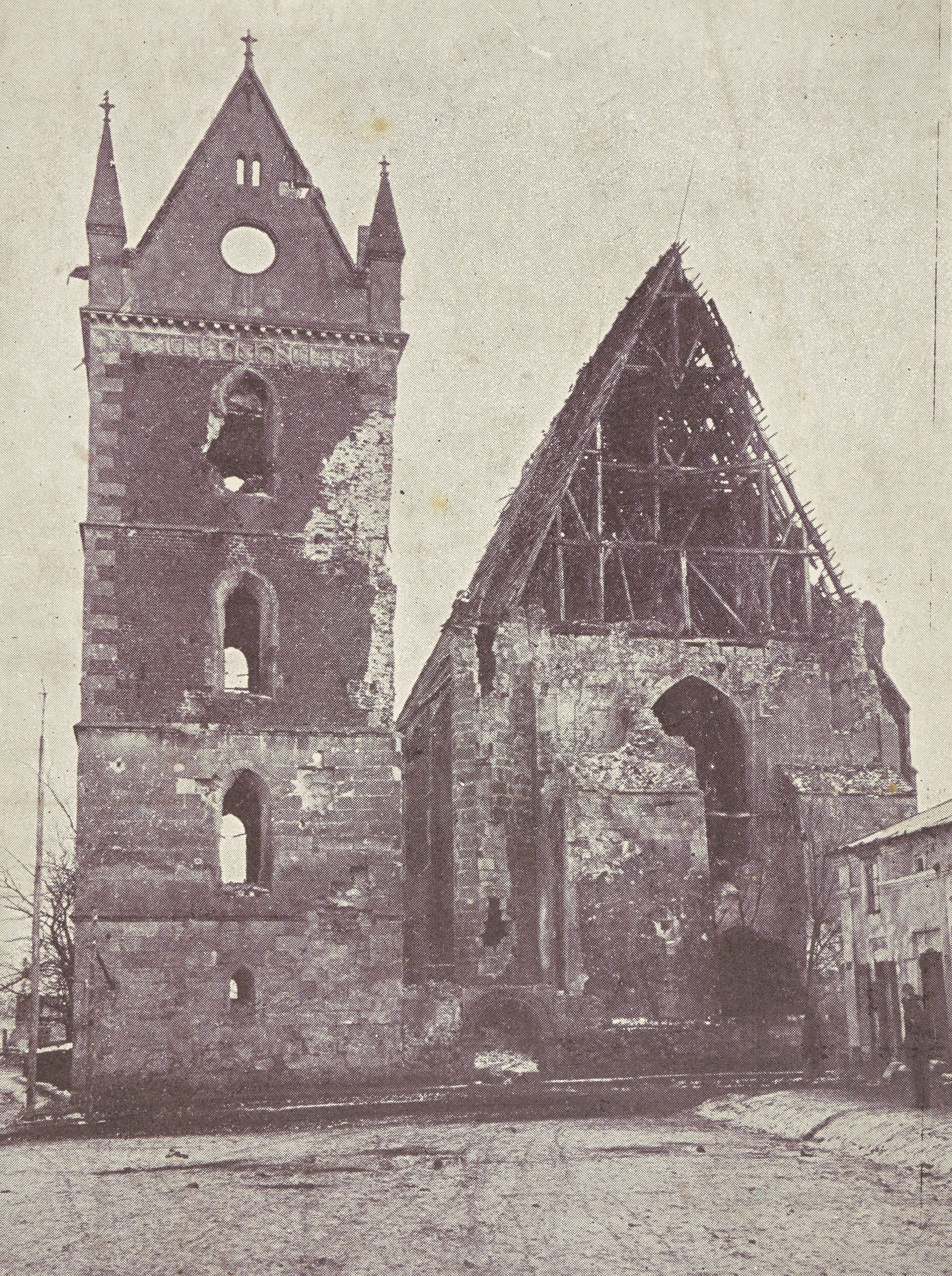
1915

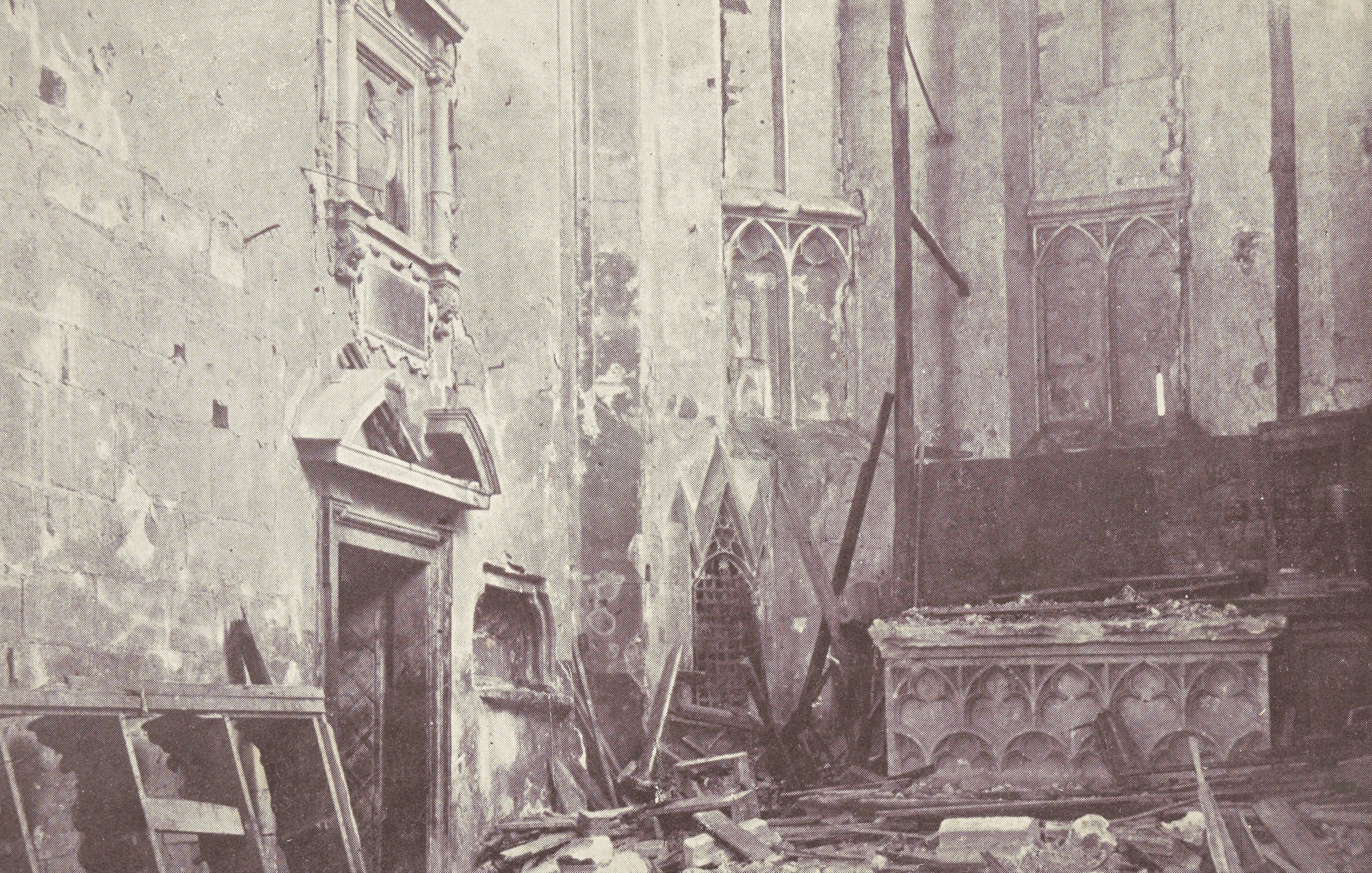
1915
