= Jewish Cemetery, Wiślica =

Jewish cemetery in Poland

Coordinates: 50.351°N 20.671°E

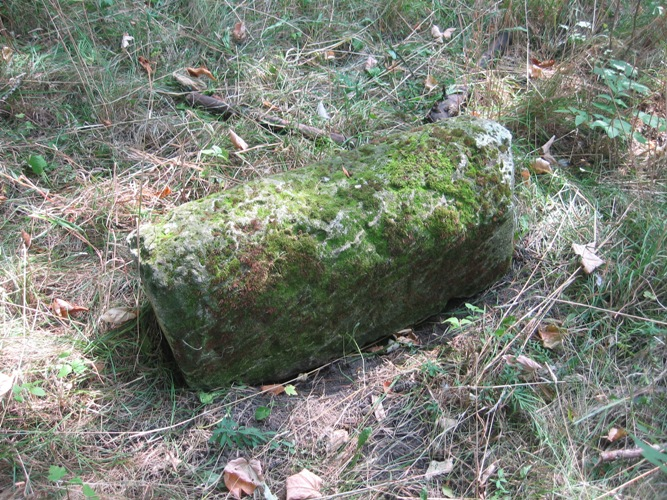
Fragment of a Jewish grave in Wiślica

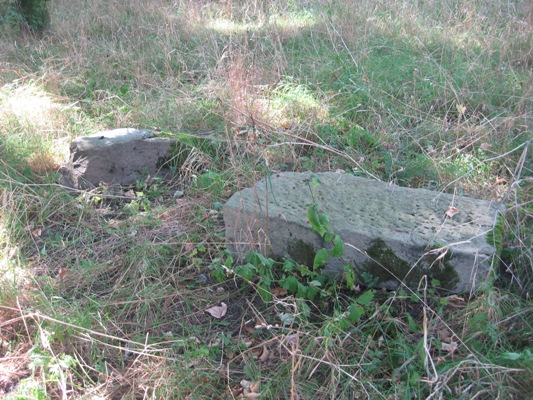
Fragments of a destroyed grave in the Jewish cemetery in Wiślica

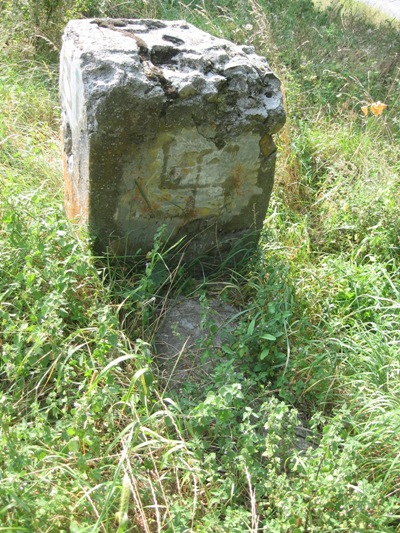
The last remaining Jewish grave in Wiślica with a swastika painted on it

Jewish Cemetery in Wiślica is the cemetery of the Jewish community which lived in Wiślica, Poland, until 1942. The cemetery was created in the 17th century. It is located in the northwest part of the village, near the Złota street, on a woody terrain.

The cemetery was destroyed during and after the Second World War. In the 1980s, a narrow asphalt road, linking the Złota street to the village's bypass, was built in the middle of the necropolis. Nowadays, the cemetery contains only a few remains of destroyed graves and one grave with preserved tombstone (mazewa). A few years ago, the cemetery was desecrated, as antisemitic and Nazi symbols were painted on the remaining gravestones. The cemetery was restored in 2016.
