= Jurków, Świętokrzyskie Voivodeship =

Jurków
- Village
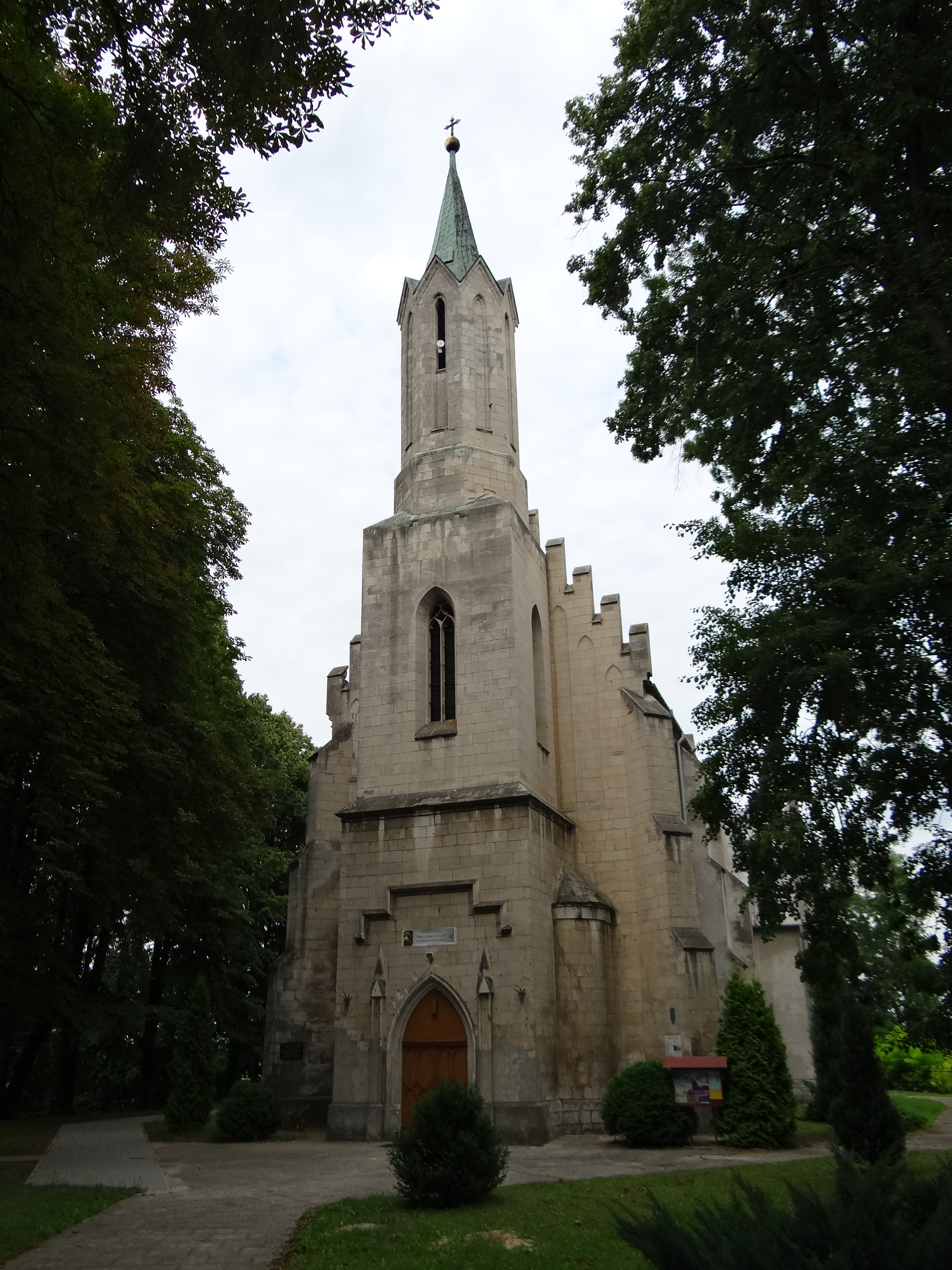
- Catholic church

- Location within Poland
- Coordinates: 50°21′28″N 20°38′31″E
- Country: Poland
- Voivodeship: Świętokrzyskie
- County: Busko
- Gmina: Wiślica
- Population (approx.): 590

Jurków [ˈjurkuf] is a village in the administrative district of Gmina Wiślica, within Busko County, Świętokrzyskie Voivodeship, in south-central Poland. It lies approximately 3 km (2 mi) north-west of Wiślica, 14 km (9 mi) south-west of Busko-Zdrój, and 59 km (37 mi) south of the regional capital Kielce.
