= Gedko Sasinowic =

Polish bishop (died 1223)

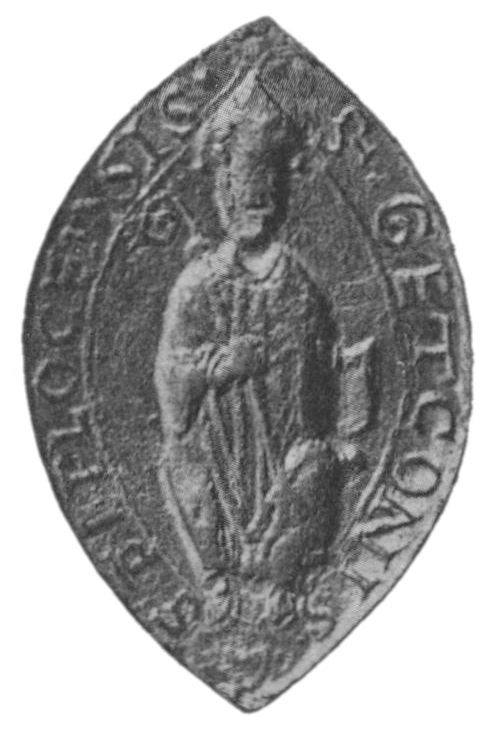
His seal

Gedko Powało or Gedko Sasinowic (Gedko, son of Sasin) (died 1223) was a medieval Bishop of Płock.

Born into the Ogończyk nobile family. He was son of Sasin and nephew of Żyro. Gedko, bishop of Kraków, was his father's cousin.

He was made provost of the chapter of the Cathedral of Kraków in 1189 and in 1206 became bishop of Płock.

He is first attested in correspondence with Christian of Oliva the bishop of Chełmno, in Prussia, in a document dated 5 August 1222. Here he appears to be subordinate to the Prussian Bishopric. Płock appears to have been a base for missionary activity into Prussia at this time.

He is also recorded as approving the donation of the Pope Honorius III in the Bull Cum a nobis petitur in 1223.

The death of Gedko in 1223 left a power vacuum and the bishops throne remained vacant for two years as it was disputed between Jan Gozdawita and Gunter Prus. Both men eventually became Bishop.

Religious titles
Preceded by Wit z Chotela	Bishop of Płock; 1206-1223	Succeeded by Jan Gozdawita
