= Kobylniki, Busko County =

Kobylniki
- Village
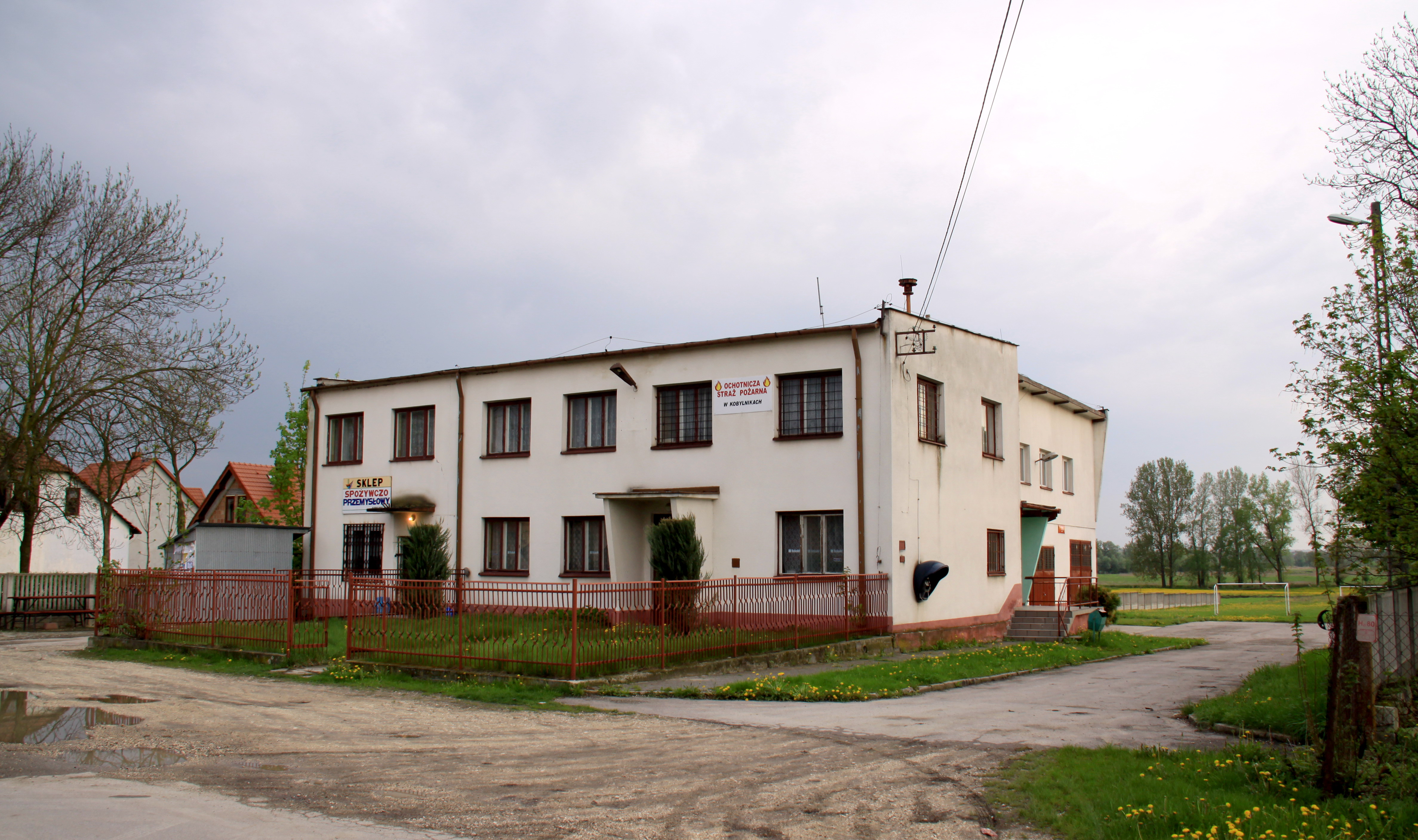

- Location within Poland
- Coordinates: 50°22′51″N 20°39′38″E
- Country: Poland
- Voivodeship: Świętokrzyskie
- County: Busko
- Gmina: Wiślica
- Population (approx.): 460

Kobylniki [kɔbɨlˈniki] is a village in the administrative district of Gmina Wiślica, within Busko County, Świętokrzyskie Voivodeship, in south-central Poland. It lies approximately 4 km (2 mi) north of Wiślica, 11 km (7 mi) south-west of Busko-Zdrój, and 56 km (35 mi) south of the regional capital Kielce.
