= Gmina Wiślica =

Gmina Wiślica Wiślica Commune
- Gmina
- Coat of arms
- Interactive map of Gmina Wiślica
- Coordinates (Wiślica): 50°20′48″N 20°40′25″E
- Country: Poland
- Voivodeship: Świętokrzyskie
- County: Busko
- Seat: Wiślica

Area
  - Total: 100.58 km^{2} (38.83 sq mi)

Population (2006)
  - Total: 5,690
  - Density: 56.6/km^{2} (147/sq mi)
- Website: www.ug.wislica.pl

Gmina Wiślica is a rural gmina (administrative district) in Busko County, Świętokrzyskie Voivodeship, in south-central Poland. Its seat is the village of Wiślica, which lies approximately 14 kilometres (9 mi) south of Busko-Zdrój and 60 km (37 mi) south of the regional capital Kielce.

The gmina covers an area of 100.58 square kilometres (38.8 sq mi), and as of 2006 its total population is 5,690.

The gmina contains part of the protected area called Nida Landscape Park.

== Villages ==
Gmina Wiślica contains the villages and settlements of Brzezie, Chotel Czerwony, Gluzy, Górki, Gorysławice, Hołudza, Jurków, Kobylniki, Koniecmosty, Kuchary, Łatanice, Ostrów, Sielec, Skorocice, Skotniki Dolne, Skotniki Górne, Szczerbaków, Szczytniki, Wawrowice and Wiślica.

== Neighbouring gminas ==
Gmina Wiślica is bordered by the gminas of Busko-Zdrój, Czarnocin, Nowy Korczyn, Opatowiec, Pińczów and Złota.
