= Statutes of Casimir the Great =

Laws issued by Casimir III, King of Poland

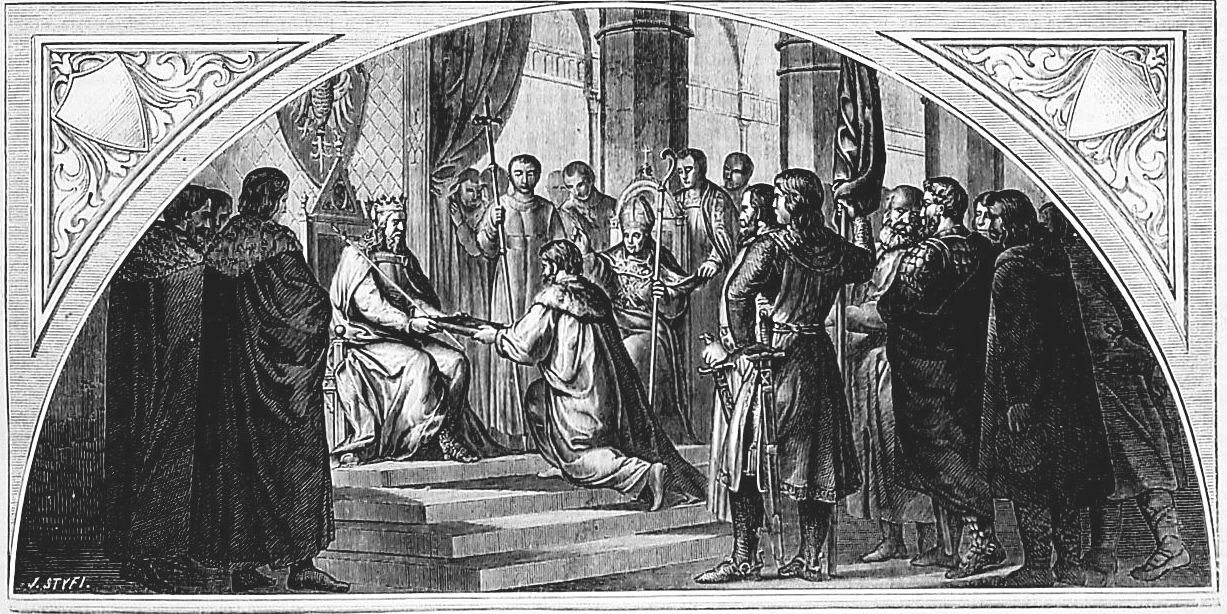
Karol Marconi, Statute of Wiślica being granted by Casimir the Great

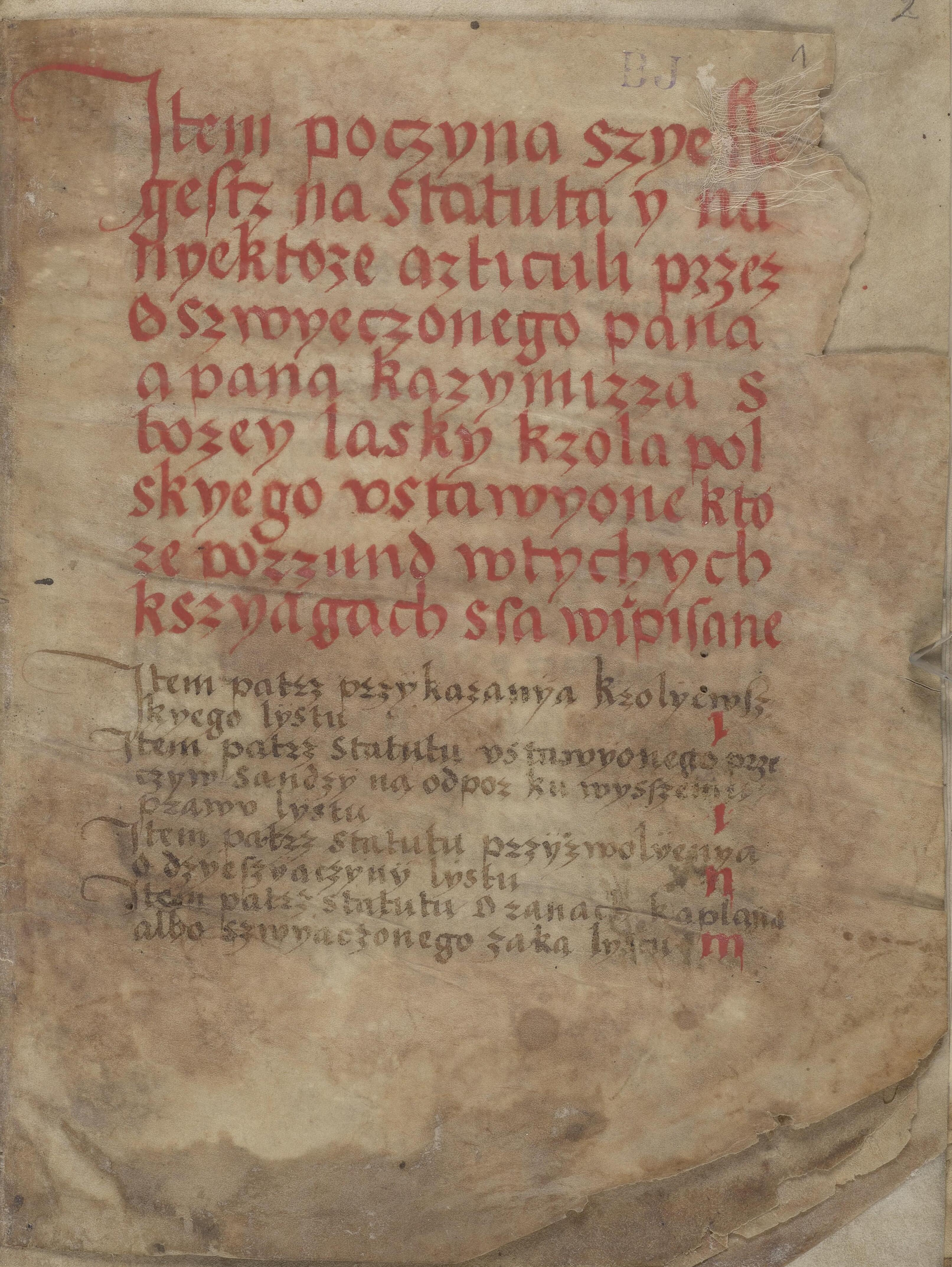
Translation of statutes into Polish, the early 16th century.

The Statutes of Casimir the Great or Piotrków-Wiślica Statutes (Polish: Statuty wiślicko-piotrkowskie) are a collection of laws issued by Casimir III the Great, the king of Poland, in the years 1346-1362 during congresses in Piotrków and Wiślica. It was the first and the only significant codification of laws during the times of the Piast dynasty.

== Background ==
In the middle of the 12th century, following the ill-thought testament of Bolesław III Krzywousty, his sons begun the process of fragmentation of Poland. It would take Polish rulers over two centuries to unite most of the lands that Bolesław controlled under one ruler. This was achieved in the 14th century by Władysław I Łokietek. Władysław's son, Casimir III the Great, earned his singular reputation not through military exploits but through his acumen as a builder, administrator and diplomat. One of his project included an attempt to unify and codify law in the lands he controlled, in the attempt to build stronger ties between different provinces, and to tie them more tightly to the central government.

In the end, due to opposition from various factions, which saw the codification and unification of the legal system in the Kingdom of Poland as weakening their position, Casimir was not able to fully accomplish his task. He was nonetheless able to do so in two major provinces of Poland. The Piotrków statute regulated the law in Greater Poland (Wielkopolska), and the Wiślica statute in Lesser Poland (Małopolska).

The date specific statutes were passed is not certain; it is accepted that most work was done in the years 1346-1362, that it took multiple congresses (wiec), and that both statutes were finished by 1362. Further, historians now agree that the Statutes were partially written after the death of Casimir, and later the entire work was incorrectly attributed to him.

== Statutes ==
About 2/3 of the Statutes concerned the criminal law; the rest, private (civil) law.

Characteristically, most provisions are written with a didactic justification for them.

The Statutes were written in Latin. In the early 15th century they were translated into Polish and later, into Ruthenian. In the late 15th century they were printed. Since May 2024, the early 16th century Polish translation of the Statutes is exhibited at a permanent exhibition in the Palace of the Commonwealth in Warsaw. The text of this copy was written on parchment and illuminated with decorative initials and floral motifs in the margins.

== Importance ==
The statutes codified the existing legal customs in Poland for the first time. They would form the basis of the Polish law in centuries to come, and would be expanded by codification of other customs, precedents and passing of other legal acts. They also succeeded in uniting the country.

== Bibliography ==
- Makowski, Tomasz; Sapała, Patryk, eds. (2024). The Palace of the Commonwealth. Three times opened. Treasures from the National Library of Poland at the Palace of the Commonwealth. Warsaw: National Library of Poland.
