= Jan Gozdawita =

Polish bishop

Gozdawa coat of arms.

Jan of the Gozdawa coat of arms (???-1227) was bishop of Płock from 1225 to 1227.

After the death of Bishop Gedko in 1223, the Płock Cathedral chapter were at an impasse in the choice of his successor. Some supported Jan, the others Gunter. This resulted in a two-year vacancy on the episcopal capital which ended with the resignation of Gunter and appointment Jan in 1225.

Little is known about Jan himself. Jan Długosz merely calls him in his catalog of the Płock Bishops an excellent and prudent bishop.
