= Wiślica =

- Town
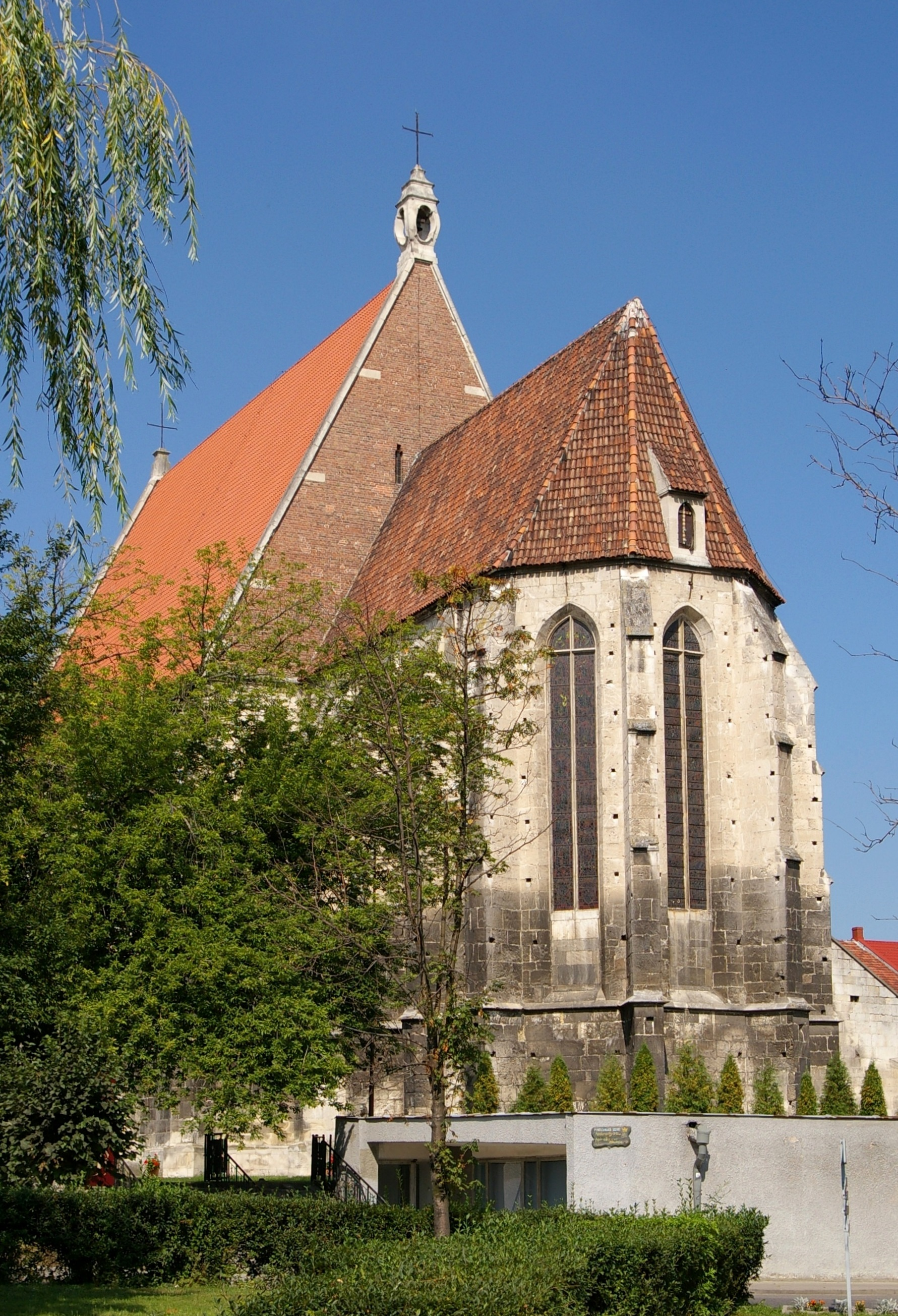
- Collegiate Basilica of the Birth of the Blessed Virgin Mary in Wiślica

- Coat of arms

- Location within Poland
- Coordinates: 50°20′48″N 20°40′25″E
- Country: Poland
- Voivodeship: Świętokrzyskie
- County: Busko
- Gmina: Wiślica

Population
  - Total: 503
- Time zone: UTC+1 (CET)
  - Summer (DST): UTC+2 (CEST)
- Vehicle registration: TBU
- Website: www.ug.wislica.pl

Wiślica ([viˈɕlit͡sa]) (Yiddish: Vayslits) is a town in Busko County, Świętokrzyskie Voivodeship, in south-central Poland. It is the seat of the gmina (administrative district) called Gmina Wiślica. It lies on the Nida River, approximately 14 km (9 mi) south of Busko-Zdrój and 60 km (37 mi) south of the regional capital Kielce. In 2016 the town had a population of 503. It was the smallest town in Poland in 2018.

== History ==
=== Medieval period ===
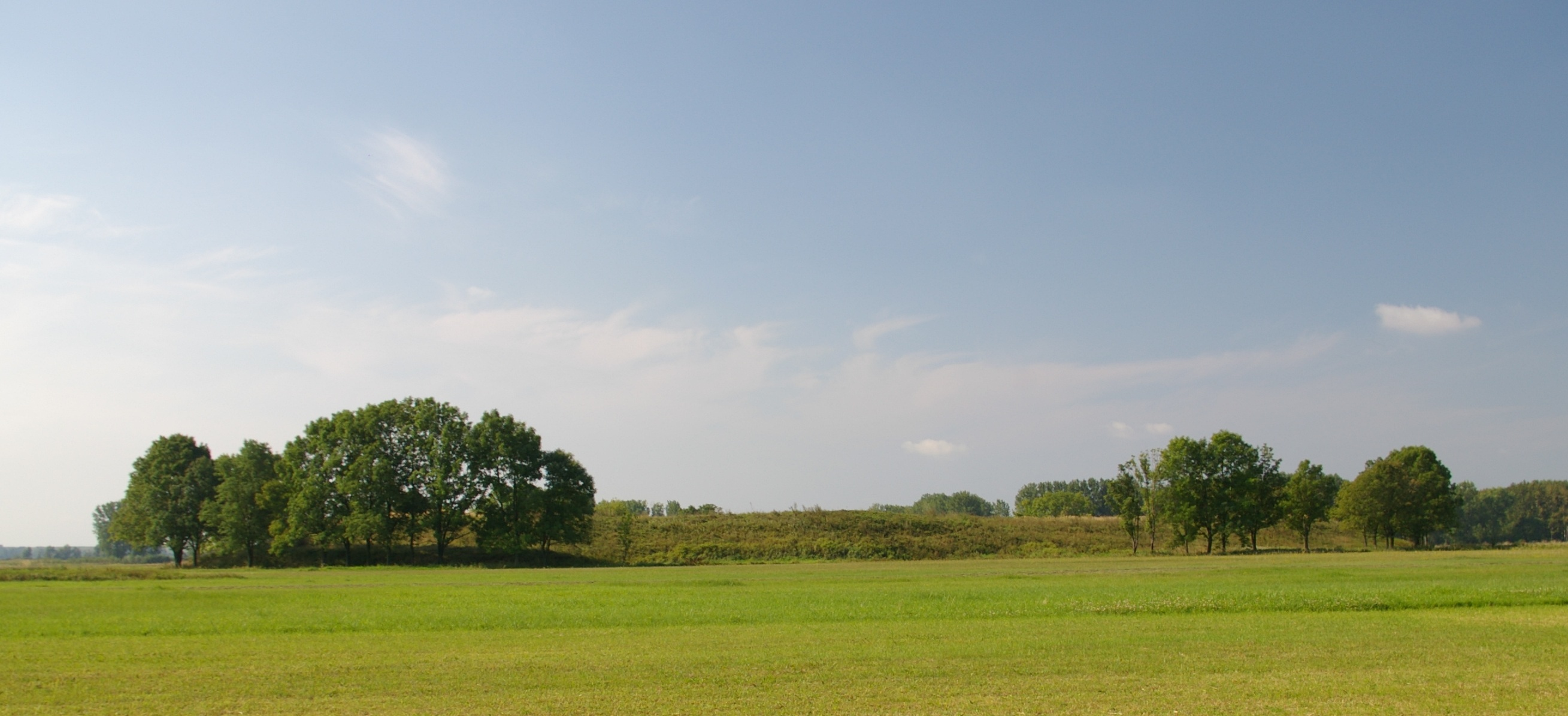
The Hillfort, 9th/10th century

Wiślica is an ancient settlement and has played an important role in Polish history. The town was founded more than 1000 years ago, close to the important commercial routes, running from Kraków to Sandomierz. At that time it was probably the capital of the Vistulans, a tribe which inhabited this region of Poland. After coming under temporary rule of Great Moravia and Bohemia, these lands were incorporated into Poland by Duke Mieszko I in 990. The first guarded settlement was probably established at the end of the 9th century, long before Polish statehood. The town was allegedly sacked in 1135 by a Ruthenian raid under Volodymyrko Volodarovych, although all primary sources from that time are unreliable, and show signs of exaggeration and invention. The remains that survive today are of the settlement which was erected at the end of the 12th century. Wiślica was known to have a regular street system, unique for the time. The area compromised ten sub-settlements, whose inhabitants worked for the needs of the town. It is very likely that the town was later pillaged by the Mongols during the first Mongol invasion of Poland in 1241.

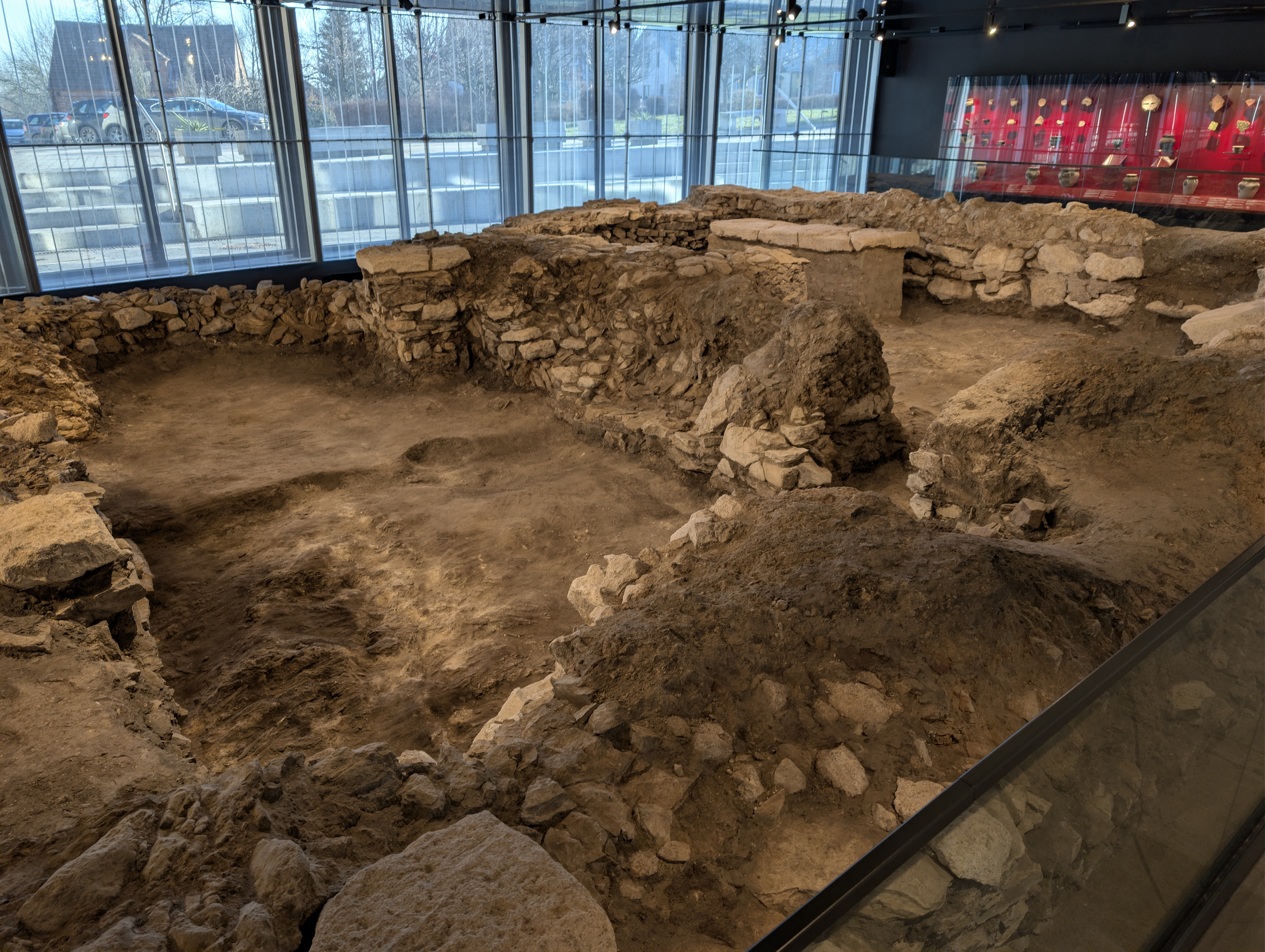
Remains of St. Nicolaus Church, Wiślica, 10th century

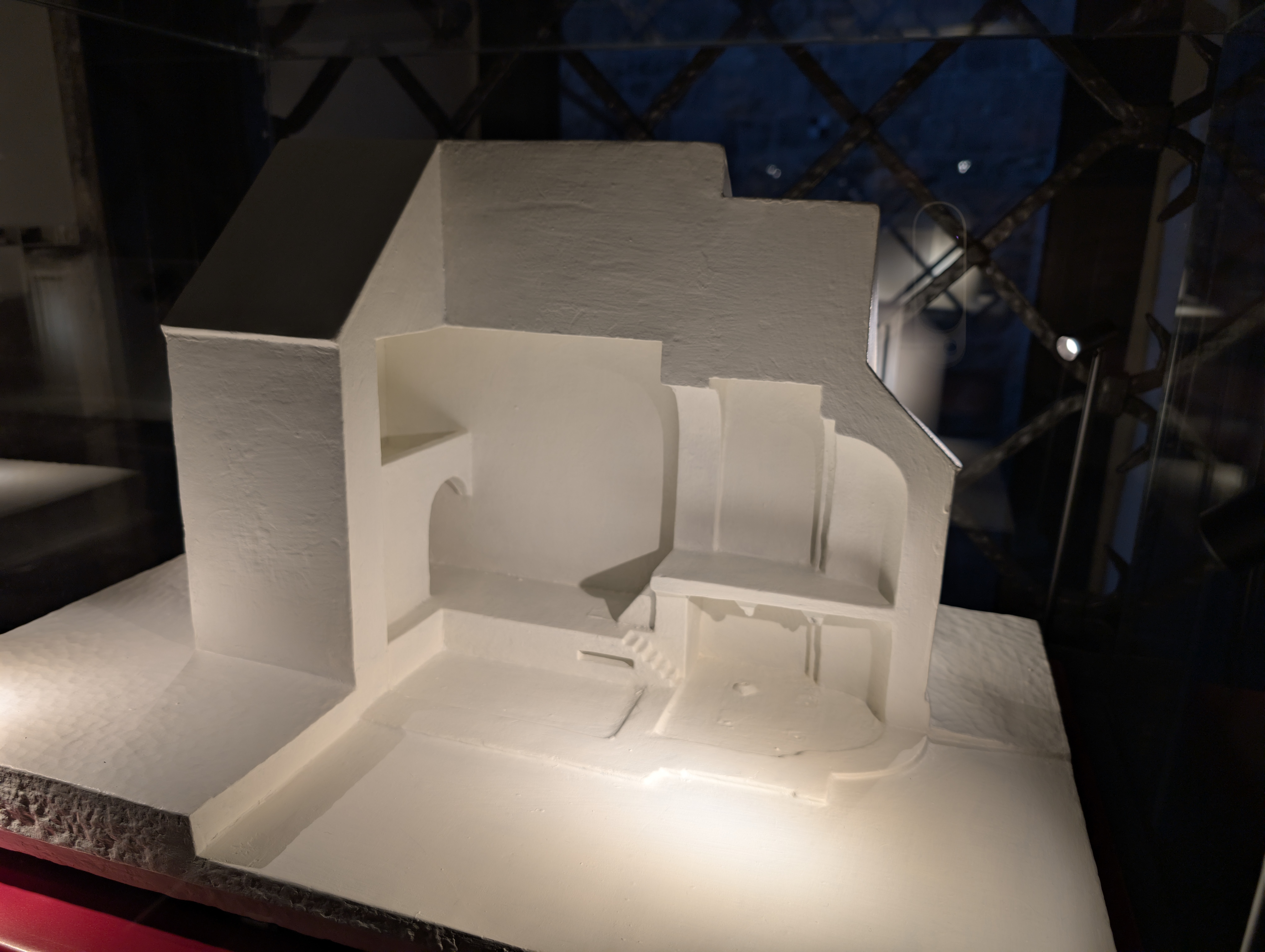
Model of St. Nicolaus Church showing a burial crypt under the altar area, where the "Orants" slab was found preserved in the 1950s

In the late 1950s, archaeologists discovered the foundations of a small church dating back to the 10th or 11th century. Its remains are exposed at the museum pavilion. It was one of the oldest churches in market settlements of the Lesser Poland region.

The gypsum baptismal font situated beneath the church foundations became a scientific sensation and the subject of heated discussions soon after its discovery. It most likely served as a font for collective baptising in the 9th century and was regarded one of the earliest finds of its kind on Polish soil.

In the 12th century, Wiślica became an important centre of intellectual and political life. It was given the status of a cultural centre by Helen of Znojmo, the wife of prince Casimir the Just. In the years 1166–1173 the town was the capital of the Duchy of Wiślica and hosted a large palatial complex consisting of two residences and round chapels. The excavated floor of the burial crypt in its vicinity is a priceless work of Polish art in the Romanesque style.

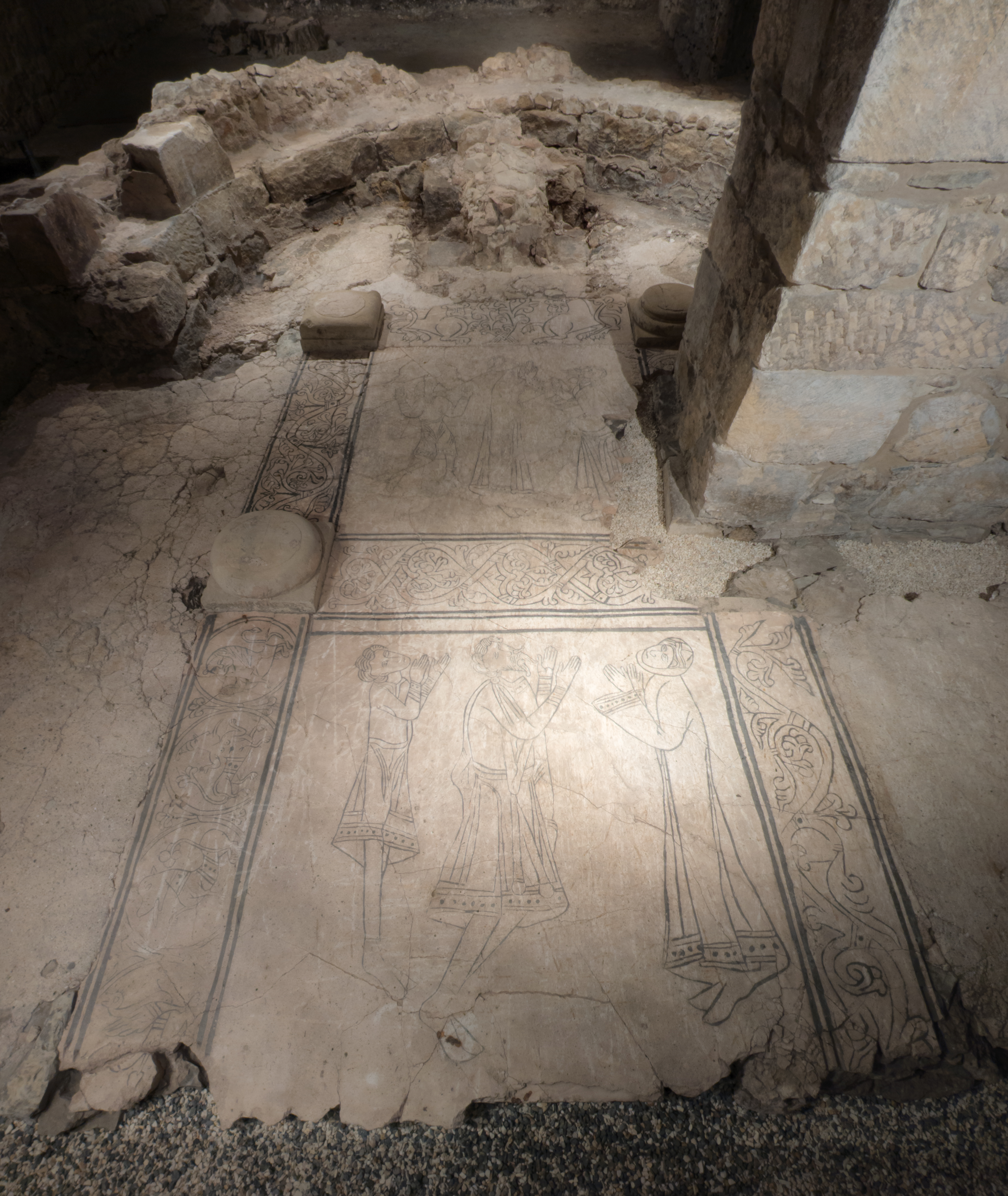
The Slab of Orants, c. 1175 AD

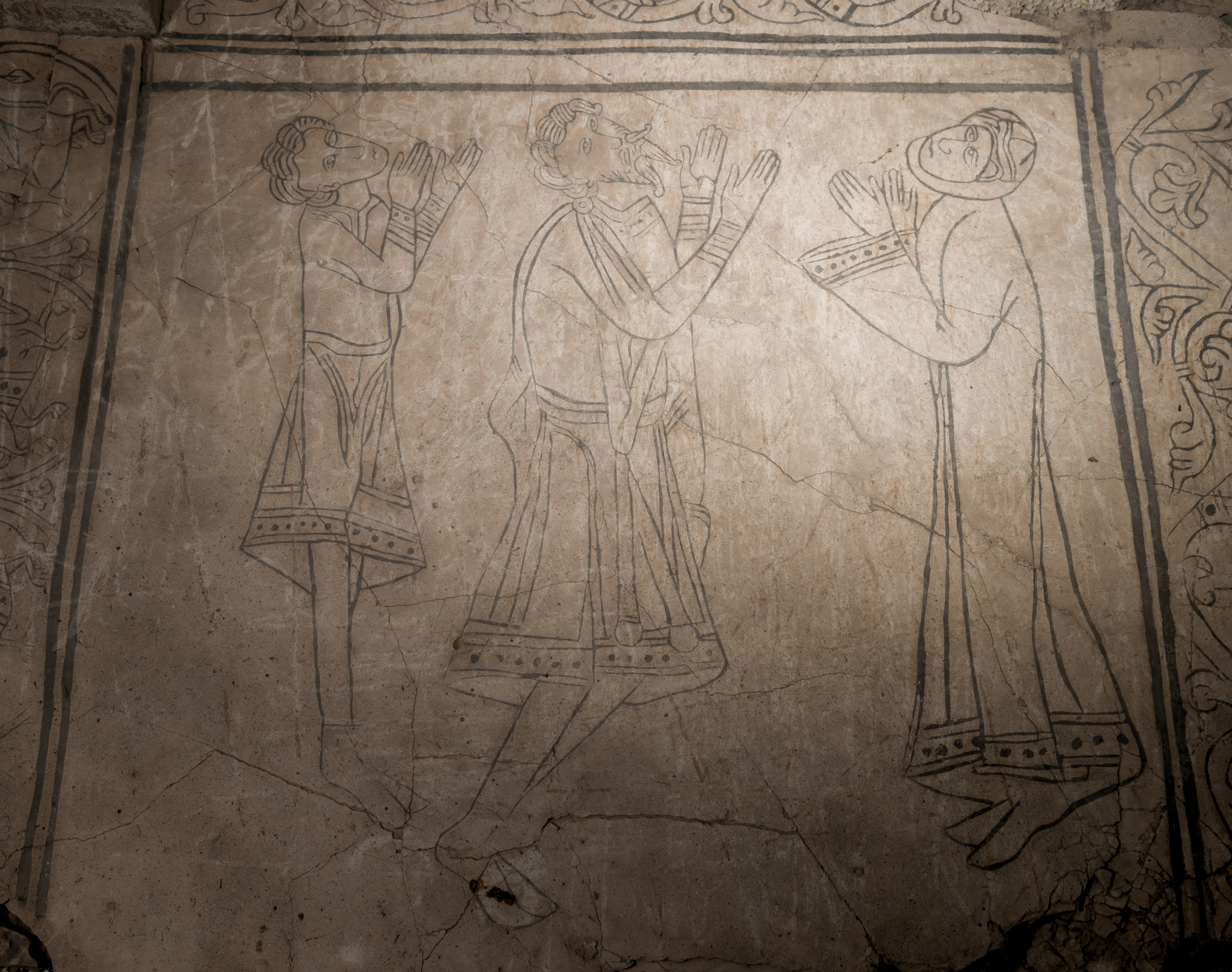
Slab of Orants, lower panel, showing Casimir the Just with wife and son

Located in the burial crypt of the 12th-century church, so-called Slab of Orants is a gypsum panel with engravings filled with black paste mixed with charcoal. It's showing two fields with plain figures separated and surrounded by decorated strips fringes, showing mythological creatures: griffins, a female centaur and the tree of life. The figures are believed to represent prince Henry of Sandomierz and Casimir the Just with their families. It is also a burial place of Henry of Sandomierz. The church with Slab of Orants was replaced in the 13th century by a bigger, three-aisled basilica. Its remains are still visible in the vaults and feature a decorative ceramic floor.

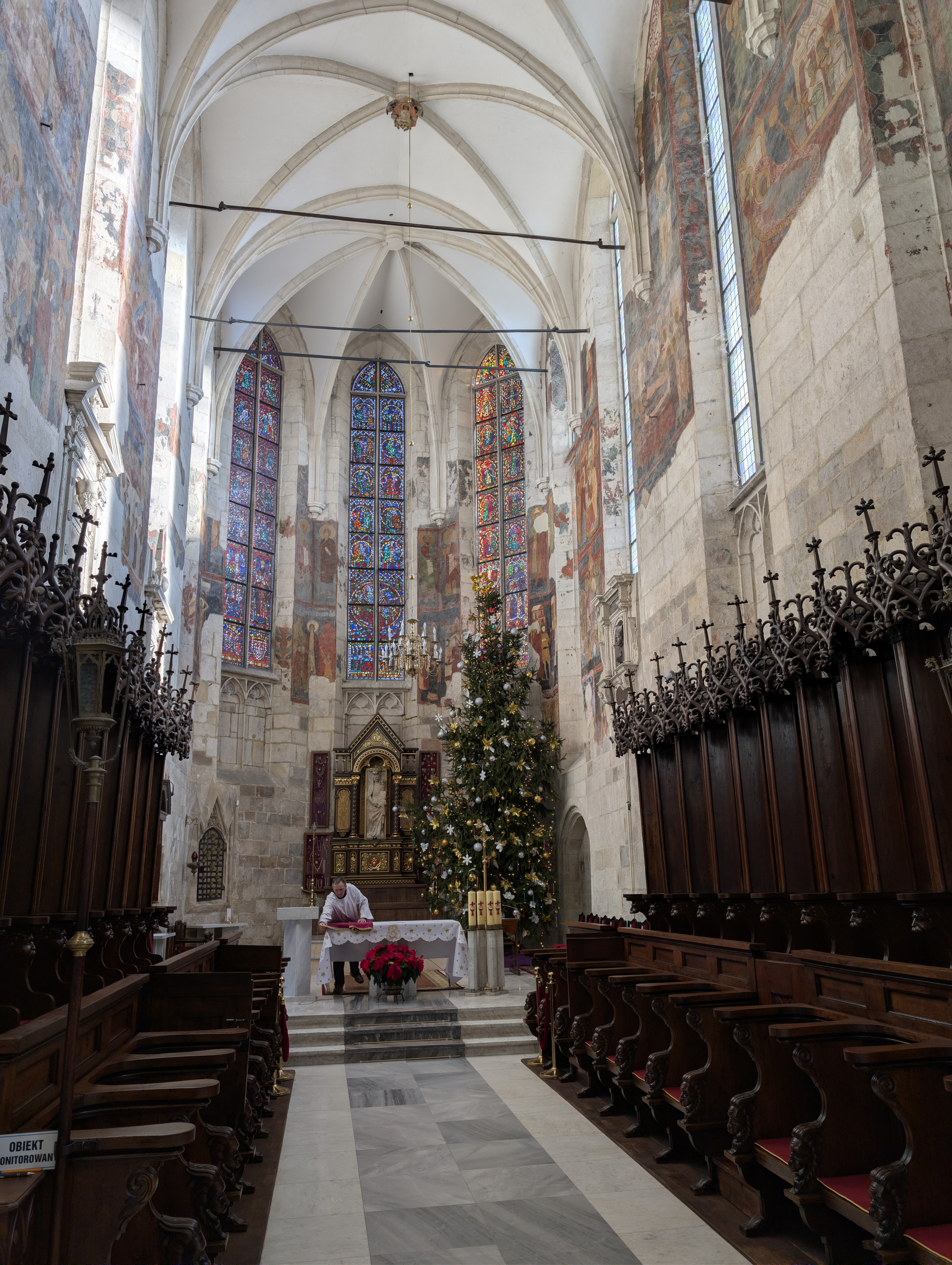
Collegiate church in Wiślica

The contemporary church was erected by Casimir III the Great in the mid-14th century. It is an excellent example of the Gothic style and one of its kind in southern Poland. Also, it is a fine example of a two-aisled type church. The interior is richly decorated by precious and unique wall paintings, commissioned in around 1400 by King Władysław II Jagiełło. Two buildings located next to the basilica were erected for Jan Długosz in the 15th century in the late Brick Gothic style with some traces of early Renaissance architecture. In 1442, Długosz became a cantor at the Wiślica church and two years later its curator. In around 1460 he founded the belfry and a building for 12 canons and 12 assistant curates, a rare monument of medieval residential complex.

Wiślica was granted charter rights by Ladislaus the Short in 1326. Since this time it was a place of frequent political gatherings, as well as the place of reading out of Wiślica Statutes. His son, king Casimir the Great built the towns fortified walls with three gates and the castle which was later pulled down. The town's spacious layout changed in those years. The new center of Wiślica was located on the commercial route, the so-called Via Salis. New bridges on the River Nida were constructed. Wiślica was granted important privileges, toll customs on the bridges, the exemption of townspeople custom duties and the right of storing salt. Wiślica was then known for its beer, which was delivered to Kraków for the royal court.

From the 14th century Wiślica was the capital of a province, from the 15th century it was a county capital and the seat of a starosta (governor).

=== Modern period ===
In 1528 king Sigismund I the Old granted Wiślica the right to build municipal waterworks. By the end of the 16th century, the town was destroyed by successive fires, floods and plagues, and became marginalized. The town's ultimate destruction took place in 1657 during the Swedish Deluge. Although Wiślica remained the county capital until the end of the 18th century, it never regained its previous significance. The 3rd Polish National Cavalry Brigade was stationed in Wiślica. In 1795, it became part of Habsburg Austria as a result of the Third Partition of Poland.

After the Polish victory in the Austro-Polish War of 1809, it was part of the short-lived Polish Duchy of Warsaw, then from 1815 in Congress Poland under Russian rule, and again in independent Poland since 1918. Wiślica lost its town charter in 1870, and it was again destroyed in the course of the First World War, in 1915.

In 1939 during the invasion of Poland, heavy fighting occurred near Wiślica. In the course of the German occupation that followed, Wiślica's Jewish citizens were murdered in The Holocaust. The Polish resistance movement was active in Wiślica, including a local unit of the Home Army under the cryptonym "Wilk" ("Wolf").

On 1 January 2018 Wiślica regained its town charter, thus becoming the smallest town in Poland. By comparison, the largest village in Poland (Kozy), had 12 529 inhabitants (as for 31.12.2013).

== Sights ==
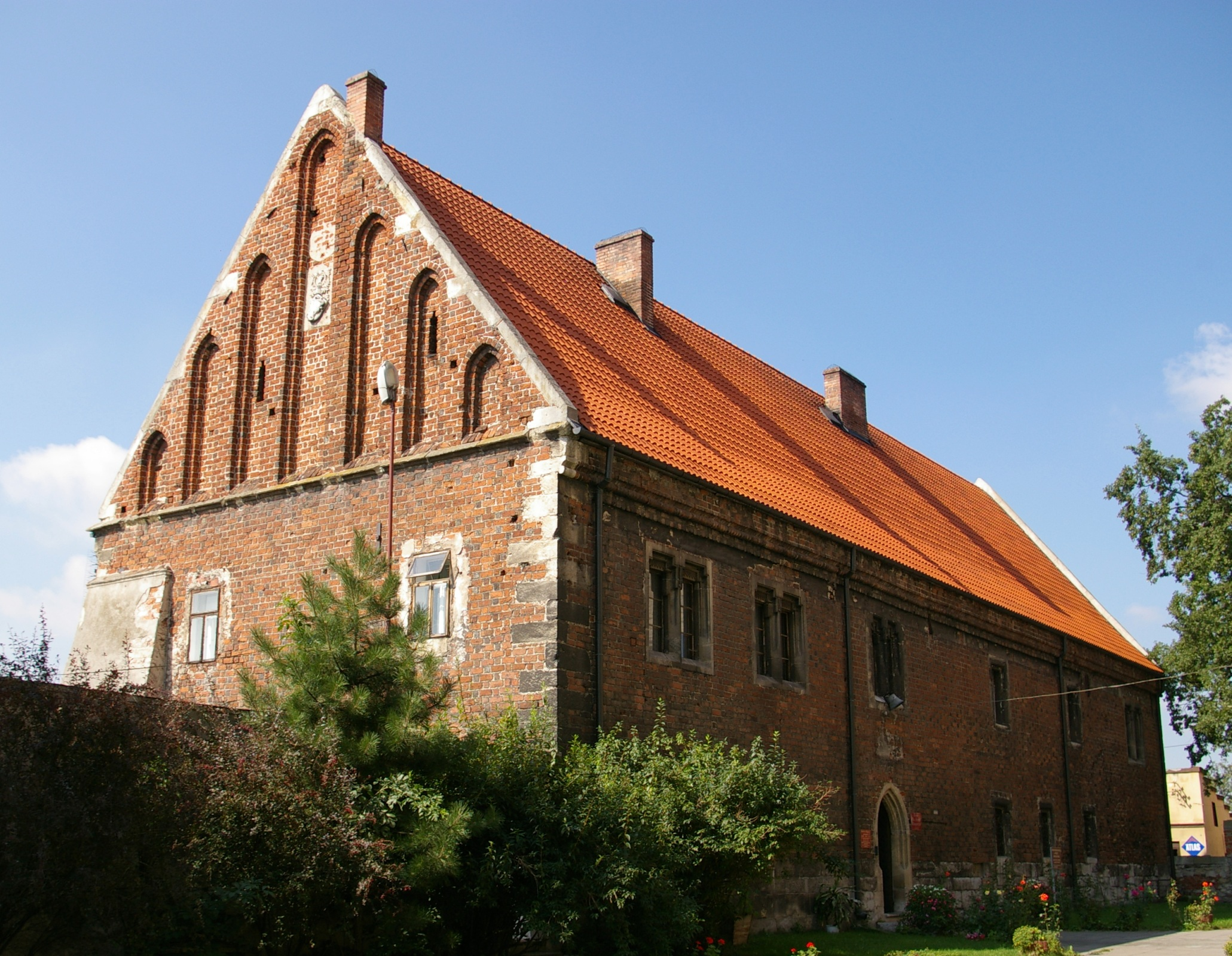
Jan Długosz House, 1460 AD

- The Collegiate Basilica of the Birth of the Blessed Virgin Mary in Wiślica was erected by king Casimir the Great in 1350. It's the oldest and largest two-aisled church in Poland. Inside, there are original wall paintings commissioned by Władysław II Jagiełło in 1400. Today, it's the Sanctuary of the Smiling Madonna a half-sculpture given to Wiślica by king Ladislaus the Short, dated to 1270–1300;
- The Belfry founded by Jan Długosz in 1460;
- The vaults of a Gothic basilica with the remains of two Romanesque churches dating from the 12th and 13th centuries;
- A unique fragment of a floor slab from a previous Romanesque church called the "Orants" slab, dating from 1175 and one of the finest examples of Polish Romanesque art;
- A house for canons and assistant curates, known as the House of Jan Długosz and dated back to 1460, with beautiful original wall-paintings;
- An archaeological pavilion covering the remains of the 10th (11th)-century Romanesque church and the famous gypsum (probably baptismal) font from 880;
- An early medieval fortified settlement from the end of the 10th century;
- A Jewish cemetery, established in the 17th century and destroyed during and after the Second World War

== See also ==
- Lesser Polish Way

== Bibliography ==
- Jurecki, M., Ponidzie. W świętokrzyskim stepie, Kraków 2009 ISBN 9788375601312
