= Belgium–Poland relations =

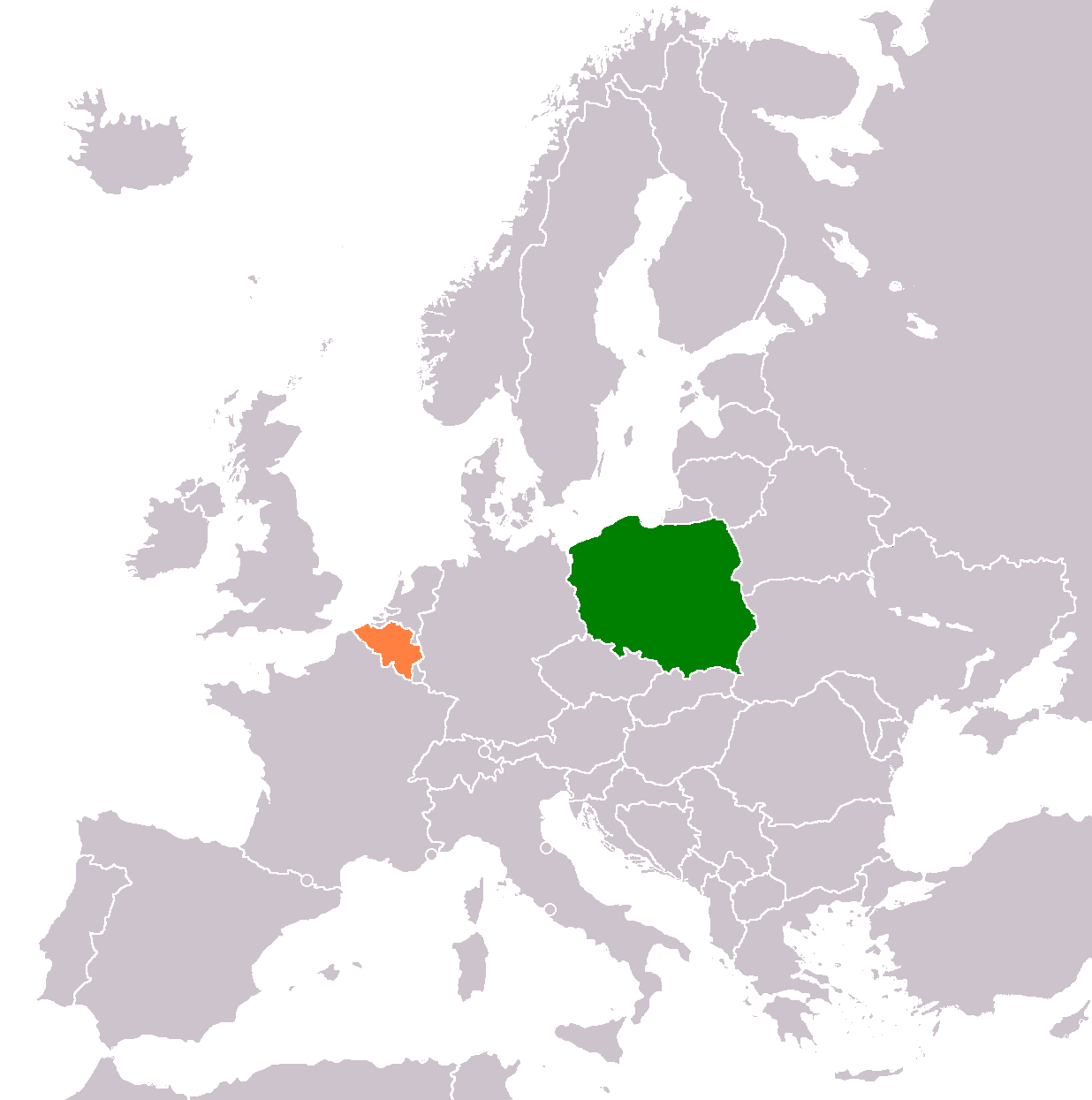
- Poland: Belgium

Belgium–Poland relations are the bilateral relations between Belgium and Poland. Official relations were established in 1919, although contacts date back over 1000 years, with frequent migrations in both directions, substantial cultural exchange, extensive trade, and, in the modern era, mutual assistance in times of need. Both nations are members of NATO, the European Union, OECD, OSCE and the Council of Europe.

== History ==
=== Early contacts ===
Contacts between the peoples of Poland and present-day Belgium have a history of over a thousand years, There were close relations between the church in Poland and Flanders and Lower Lotharingia in the High Middle Ages. Walloons became one of the first foreign immigrant groups in Poland, with Walloons settling in Wrocław probably since the 12th century, however, the first written mention of Walloon immigrants in Wrocław comes from c. 1270. In the 12th century, Walloon brothers Aleksander and Walter from Malonne served as Catholic bishops of Płock and Wrocław in Poland, respectively, and there is a possibility that it was Bishop Walter who brought the first Walloon immigrant group to Poland. In the early 13th century Duke Henry the Bearded invited further Walloon immigrants to the area of Oława and Wierzbno to the south of Wrocław.

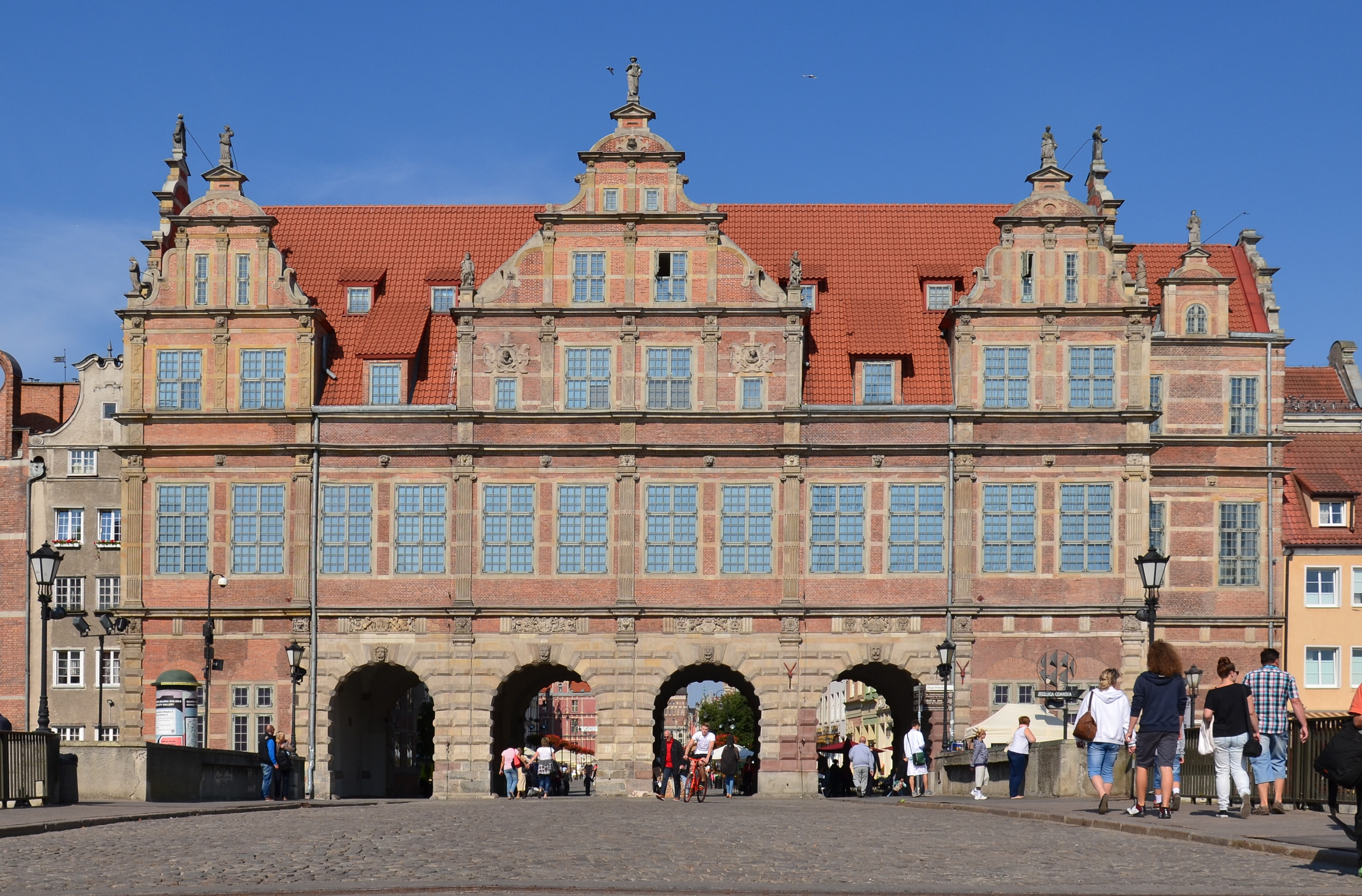
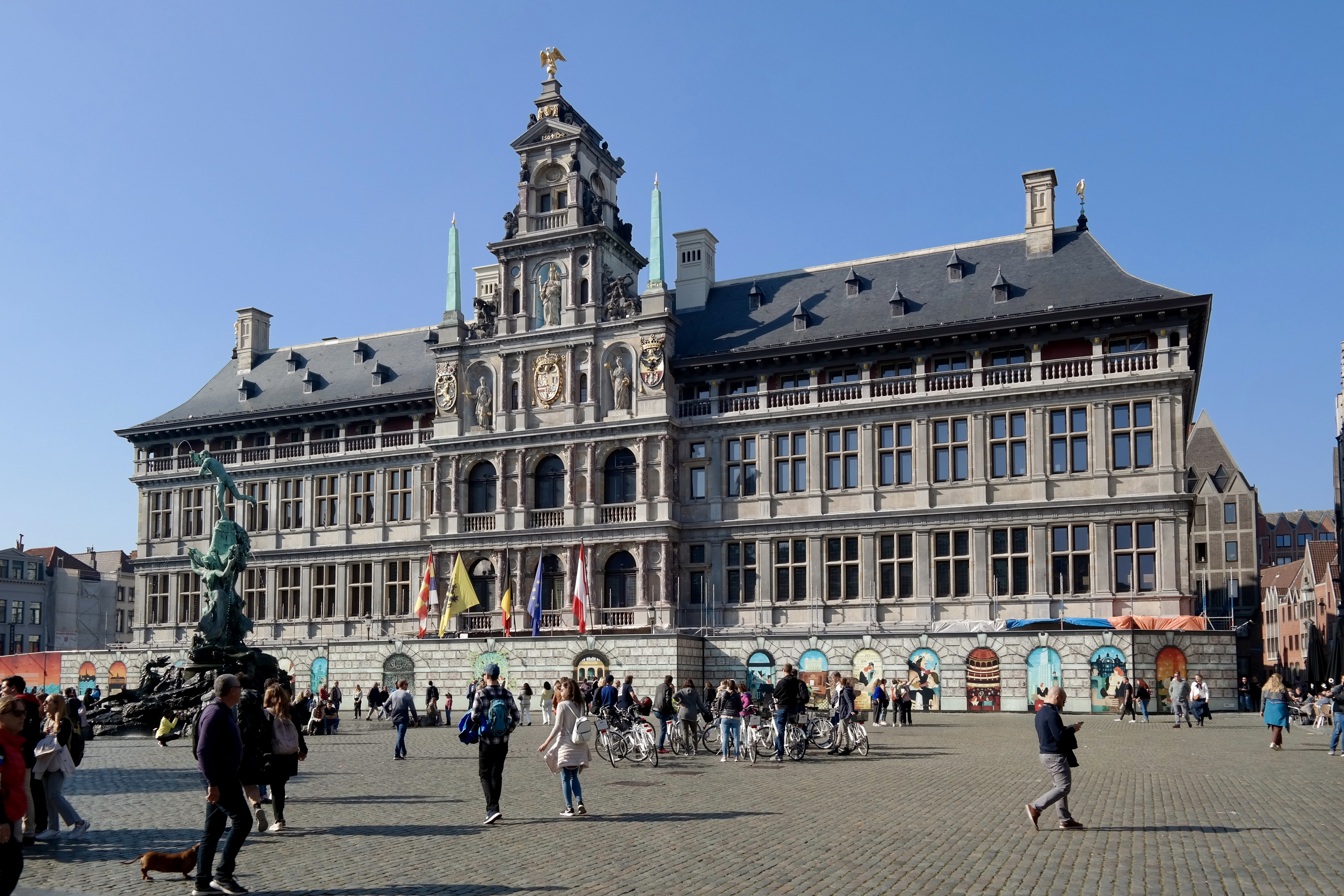
The Green Gate formal residence of Polish Kings in Gdańsk (left) was inspired by the Antwerp City Hall (right).

In the early modern period, until the late-18th-century Partitions of Poland, Poland's relations were mostly conducted throughout the relations between Poland and the entities ruling modern Belgium, i.e. Spain and Austria. In the Renaissance period, exchanges of scholars and students began between Kraków and Liège. Flemish architects Anthonis van Obbergen and Willem van den Blocke designed a number of mannerist structures in Poland, and Willem van den Blocke also has sculpted multiple lavishly decorated epitaphs and tombs in Poland. During his Grand Tour in 1624, Polish Prince and future King Władysław IV Vasa visited the workshop of Flemish painter Peter Paul Rubens.

The notable Flemming noble family of Flemish origin first settled in Pomerania in modern Poland in the 13th century with the village of Buk becoming the first estate of the family in the region. The family eventually reached high-ranking political and military posts in Poland in the 18th century, and their famous descendants were Princess Izabela Czartoryska, founder of the renowned Czartoryski Museum, and statesman Adam Jerzy Czartoryski. There are several preserved historical residences of the Flemming family in Poland.

=== 19th century ===
In 1830, both the Belgian Revolution and the November Uprising in partitioned Poland broke out in both nations' efforts to gain independence. The outbreak of the Polish uprising saved the Belgian Revolution, as it forced Russia and Prussia to abandon their planned military intervention in Belgium, as they were more focused on suppressing the uprising in Poland. This contributed to the Belgian victory and establishment of independent Belgium, whereas Poland remained under foreign rule.

The newly formed Belgium was a very Polonophile country. The Belgian press encouraged the adoption of Polish orphans, and politician Louis de Robiano of the Catholic Party proposed electing a prince from the Polish Czartoryski family as king of the Belgians.

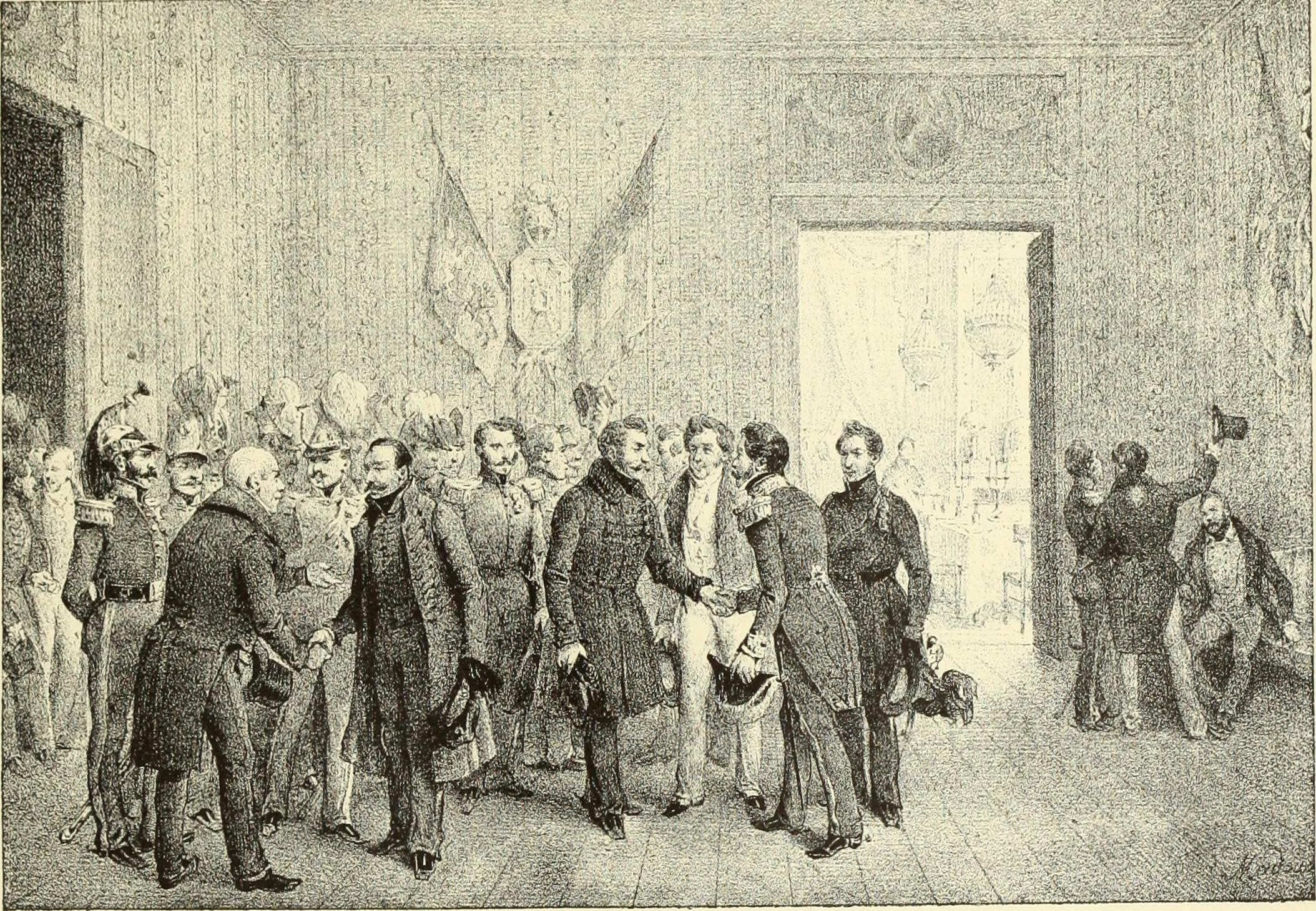
Polish refugees received in Brussels

Some 200 Poles, mostly intelligentsia and military officers, fled to Belgium, including activist Joachim Lelewel. The Poles received a warm welcome from the Belgian government and population. Polish princess Jadwiga Lubomirska, wife of Eugène, 8th Prince of Ligne, received Poles at her residences in Brussels and Belœil. Poles took up various professions in Belgium. Unique instances include Captain Józef Godebski, who became a lecturer and developed a geometry textbook that was mandatory in all military schools in Belgium, and Feliks Jastrzębski, who established a piano factory, winning a medal at an exhibition in 1841 and later becoming a supplier to Belgian kings. Polish officers were asked to help organize the Belgian army by King Leopold I of Belgium, however, amid objections from King Louis Philippe I of France, Belgium's main ally, to the creation of separate legions in the Belgian army, only about 60 Polish officers were employed in the Belgian army in the 1830s. Polish General Jan Zygmunt Skrzynecki was in charge of organizing the newly formed Belgian army, and Poles were instructors in the army. Belgian universities recognized Polish diplomas, resulting in an influx of Polish students. The Great Emigration marked the first notable wave of Polish migration to Belgium.

Belgium opened two consulates in the territory of partitioned Poland, in Gdańsk in 1839 and Warsaw in 1869.

Further Poles migrated to Belgium in the 1860s. In 1861, an insurgent Polish organization was formed in Liège, whose members trained for the Polish January Uprising against Russia, which broke out in 1863. After the fall of the uprising, some 200 Poles fled to Belgium, mostly to Brussels, Ghent and Liège. In 1867, the Polish Youth Society was founded in Ghent. Notable immigrants included pianist and composer Józef Wieniawski, and poets Seweryna Duchińska and Henryk Merzbach.

Migration of Poles to Belgium continued also later in the 19th and early 20th centuries, including of writer Maria Dąbrowska née Szumska, who first met her future husband, activist Marian Dąbrowski in Brussels.

=== 20th century ===
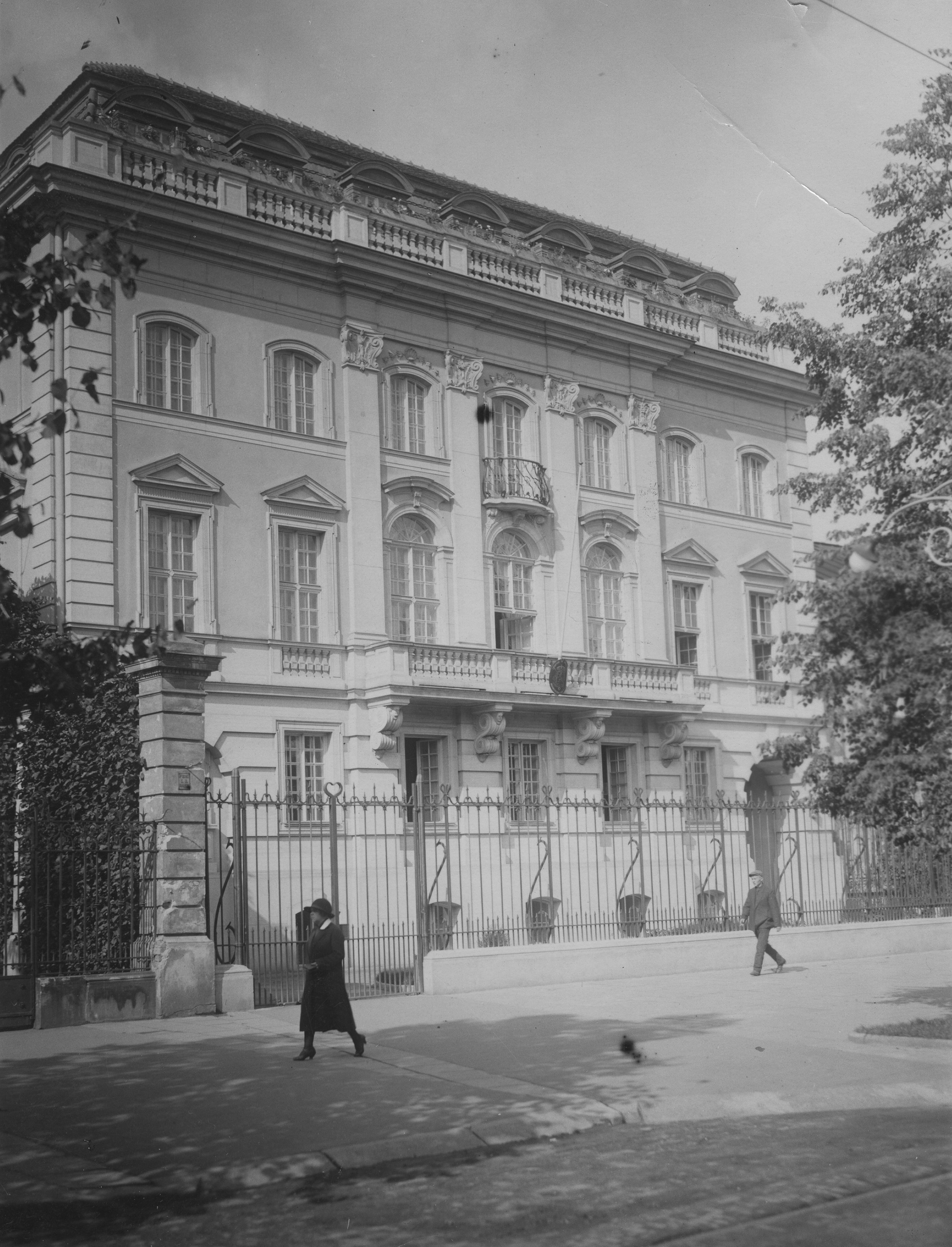
Gawroński Villa in Warsaw, seat of the Belgian Embassy in Poland in 1934−1939

During World War I, Poles from the Russian Partition of Poland conscripted to the Russian Army and Belgians were among Allied prisoners of war held by the Germans in a POW camp in Stargard in modern northwestern Poland, and there is one identified grave of a Belgian POW from that period at the war cemetery in Stargard (and more from World War II).

An independent Poland eventually revived after World War I in 1918 and the two countries subsequently established diplomatic relations. Elisabeth of Bavaria, Queen of the Belgians initiated assistance to Poland during the Polish–Soviet War of 1919–1920, first by organizing fundraising to buy medicines and bandages. Then the Belgians funded sanitary trains and field hospitals for severely wounded Polish soldiers. Belgium also supported Polish war invalids, and donated medicines for typhoid patients and food for children who had lost their homes. Afterwards, many Polish miners migrated to Belgium in the interwar period.

==== World War II ====
During World War II, both countries were invaded and occupied by Germany. Belgian prisoners of war were held alike Polish and other Allied POWs in several German prisoner-of-war camps in Poland, including Stalag I-A, Stalag I-B, Stalag II-B, Stalag II-D, Stalag III-C, Stalag VIII-A, Stalag VIII-C, Stalag XX-B, Stalag XXI-A, Stalag XXI-D, Stalag 325, Stalag 369, Stalag Luft III and Oflag VIII-C, and in numerous forced labour subcamps. Six Poles and one Belgian were among the victims of the German-perpetrated Stalag Luft III murders, and there is a memorial to the victims in Żagań, Poland. Belgians, alongside Poles and other nationals, were also among the prisoners of the particularly notorious Nazi German camps in Żabikowo, Miłoszyce, Świecko and Słońsk.

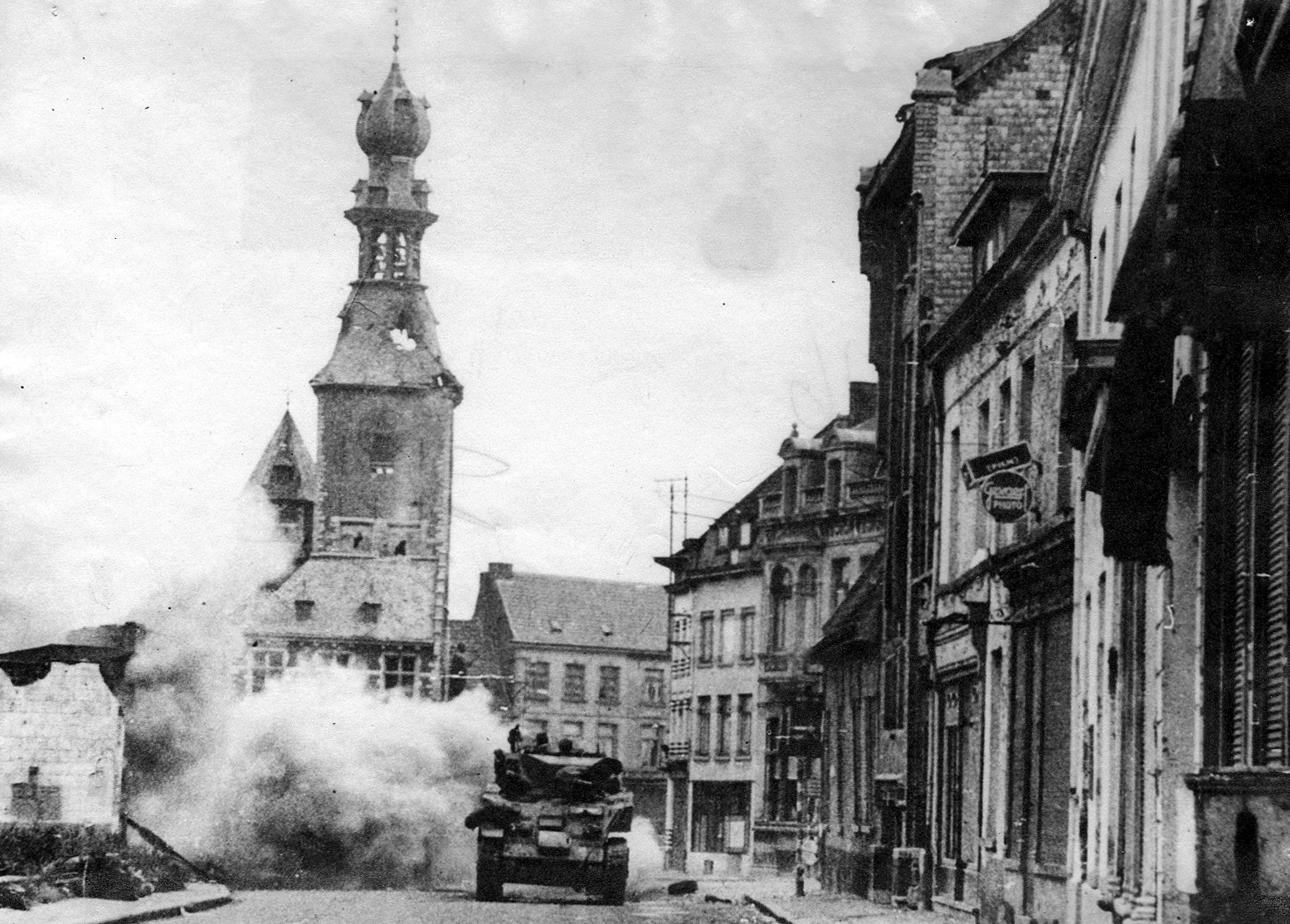
1st Polish Armoured Division liberating Tielt from German occupation in 1944

Some Polish POWs were held by the Germans in forced labour camps in German-occupied Belgium, e.g. in Elsenborn. Some Polish POWs from POW camps and forced labour subcamps in western Germany escaped to German-occupied Belgium, and then either further fled to France, Spain or Britain to join the Polish Armed Forces in the West or joined the Secret Army Belgian resistance organization and the Polish Armed Forces when they had already reached Belgium with the Western Front.

The 1st Polish Armoured Division liberated parts of Belgium from German occupation in 1944, including the cities of Ypres and Tielt. General Stanisław Maczek became an honorary citizen of almost every Flemish town he liberated, and multiple squares and streets were named after either him or his soldiers. In 2024, a museum dedicated to Stanisław Maczek and his soldiers was opened in Roeselare.

After the war, some 9,000 Poles returned from Belgium to Poland.

== Trade ==
From 2010 to 2022, there was an increase in the value of trade of goods between Belgium and Poland, followed by a slight decline from 2022 to 2024. From 2010 to 2018 and in 2021, the trade balance was positive for Belgium, while in 2019–2020 and 2022–2024 it was positive for Poland. In 2024, Belgian exports of goods to Poland reached a value of approximately €7.574 billion, while Polish exports of goods to Belgium reached a value of approximately €7.785 billion.

Since 2014, Polish exports of services to Belgium have significantly exceeded Belgian exports of services to Poland. In 2022, the value of Polish exports of services to Belgium amounted to approximately €1.920 billion, while the value of Belgian exports of services to Poland amounted to approximately €1.465 billion.

== Diaspora ==
The Polish diaspora is Belgium is estimated at 120,000, including citizens of Poland who recently migrated to Belgium and descendants of Polish migrants from the 1830s and the interbellum.

Queen Mathilde of Belgium is in part of Polish descent as the daughter of Polish countess Anna Maria Komorowska, born in Białogard, Poland.

== International organizations ==
While Belgium is a founding member of the EU and NATO, Poland became a member of NATO in 1999 and the EU in 2004.

== Diplomatic missions ==
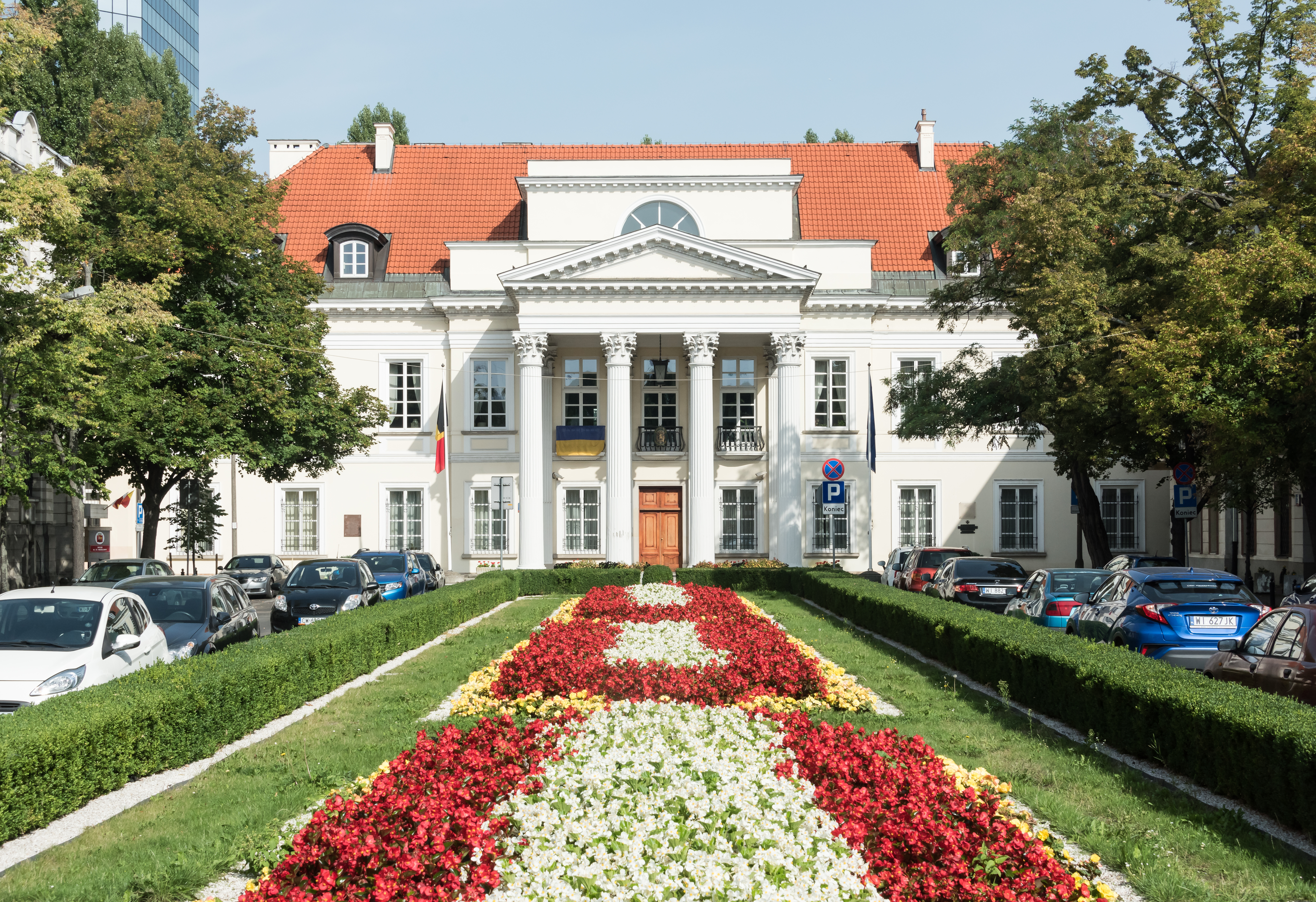
Embassy of Belgium in Warsaw

- Belgium has an embassy in Warsaw.
- Poland has an embassy in Brussels.

== See also ==
- Foreign relations of Belgium
- Foreign relations of Poland

== Bibliography ==
- Symbole Królestwa Belgii/De symbolen van het Koninkrijk België/Les symboles du Royaume de Belgique (in Polish, Dutch, and French). Agence Leacom. 2021.
- Lechwar-Wierzbicka, Edyta (2013). "Powiązania polsko-belgijskie po powstaniu listopadowym". Athenaeum. Polskie Studia Politologiczne (in Polish). No. 39. ISSN 1505-2192.
- Zientara, Benedykt (1975). "Walonowie na Śląsku w XII i XIII wieku". Przegląd Historyczny (in Polish). No. 66/3.
