= Europhile =

Admiration and fondness of Europe

A Europhile is a person who is fond of, admires, or loves European culture, society, history, food, music etc. In its narrower, and often pejorative sense, the term europhile is most often used in Europe itself in a political context, that is, in the context of an uncritical attitude towards the European Union. It refers to organizations and individuals with explicitly unquestioning pro-European attitudes, as opposed to Eurosceptics and Europhobes.

== See also ==
- Eurocentrism
- Anglophile
- Francophile
- Germanophile
- Polonophile
- Afrocentrism
- Russophile
