= Poland–NATO relations =

- Poland: NATO

Poland joined North Atlantic Treaty Organization (NATO) on 12 March 1999, following the decision taken at the Madrid Summit, in July 1997.

== History ==
Poland joined the Partnership for Peace in 1994. Poland, along with the Czech Republic and Hungary, received an invitation to participate in the 1997 Madrid Summit and became a full member on 12 March 1999.

=== Armed Forces of Poland ===
In 1991, Poland participated in the Gulf War as part of the NATO coalition forces.

Since joining NATO, the Polish army has been transitioning to Western standards and receiving new weapons. The Polish Air Force participates in patrolling the airspace of the Baltic countries. Within the framework of the new concept of the North Atlantic Alliance "Smart Defense", in addition to participating in military operations and working in multinational headquarters, Poland plays a certain role in implementing projects for the logistical support of NATO troops and training of communications specialists and automated control systems.

Since it began in 2001 Polish troops were part of the NATO-led mission in Afghanistan, ISAF.

From 2003 to 2008, the Polish military contingent participated in Operation Iraqi Freedom. Polish troops are also participating in the Alliance's operation in Afghanistan.

In 2007, the number of Polish troops in Afghanistan was increased to 1,200, and in 2008, another 2,008 Polish soldiers joined them.

Poland is participating in Operation Active Endeavour in the Mediterranean Sea.

=== Finnish and Swedish accession bids ===
On 22 July 2022, Polish president Andrzej Duda signed and approved the proposals for Finland and Sweden to apply to join NATO.

== Poland's foreign relations with NATO member states ==
- Albania
- Belgium
- Bulgaria
- Canada
- Croatia
- Czech Republic
- Denmark
- Estonia
- Finland
- France
- Germany
- Greece
- Hungary
- Iceland
- Italy
- Latvia
- Lithuania
- Luxembourg
- Montenegro
- Netherlands
- North Macedonia
- Norway
- Portugal
- Romania
- Slovakia
- Slovenia
- Spain
- Sweden
- Turkey
- United Kingdom
- United States

== See also ==
- Foreign relations of NATO
- Foreign relations of Poland
- NATO forces in Poland
