= Żyrosław II (bishop of Wrocław) =

Polish bishop

Żyrosław II (d. 1198) also known as Żyrosław was a twelfth-century Bishop of Wrocław whose tenure was from 1170 – 1198.

Little is known about his origins, career or his Episcopal work. During his tenure the Cistercians founded Leubus monastery (1175) and in a document issued from 1170 to 1189, he confirmed the Hospitallers the tithe possession of their Church. In the same year he gave the Hospitallers gave the tithe of the district of Legnica.

He was buried in the Wrocław Cathedral.

Religious titles
| Preceded by Walter | Bishop of Wrocław; 1170–1198 | Succeeded by Jarosław, Duke of Opole |
