= Poles in Luxembourg =

Polish diaspora in Luxembourg

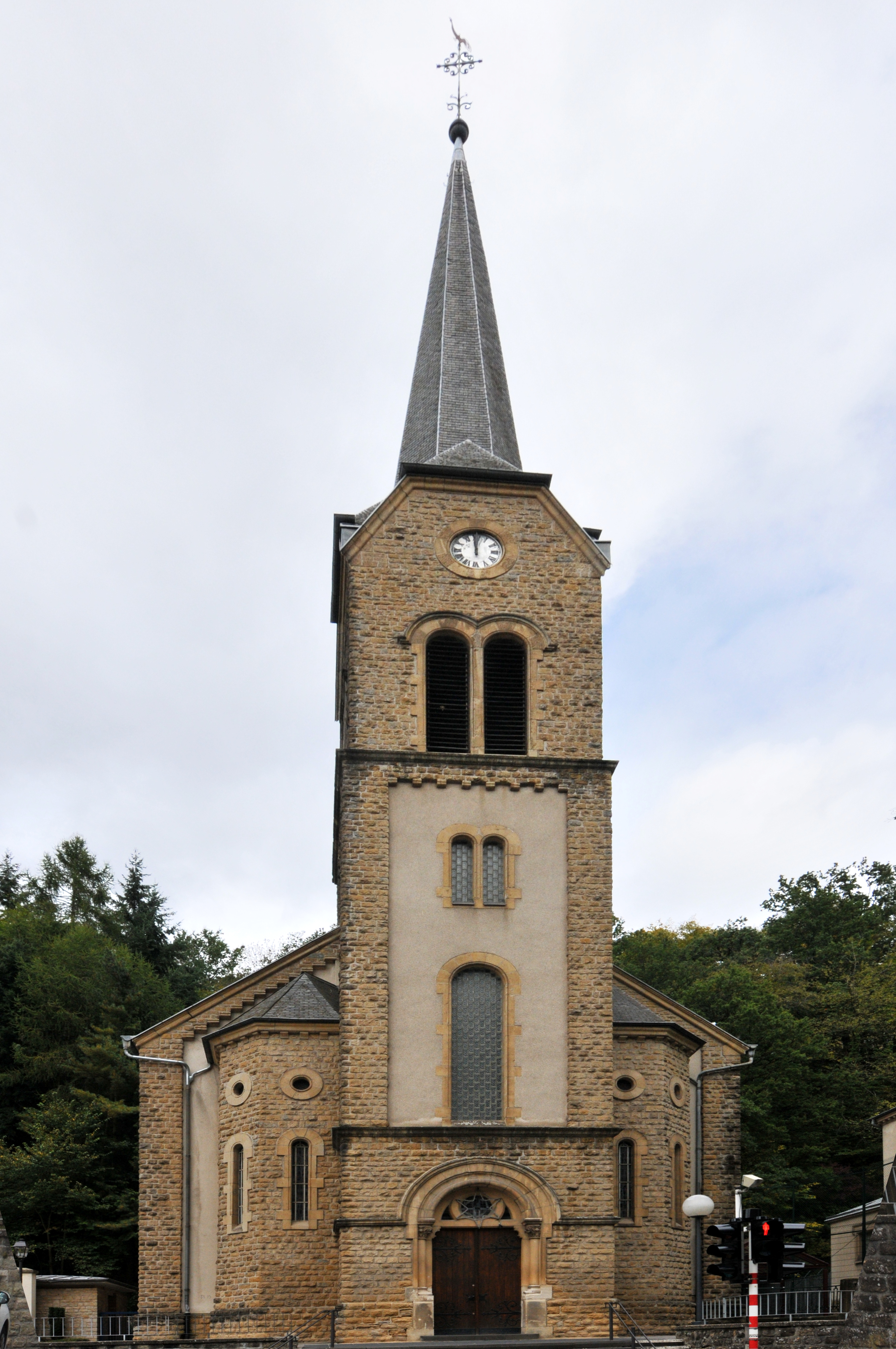
- Saint Henry's church in Luxembourg City, which hosts Polish-language church masses

Total population
- 4,844 (2020)

Poles in Luxembourg form a population 4,844 (as of 2020), consisting mostly of migrant workers. They are the country's ninth largest group of foreign immigrants, and the second largest from Central Europe (after Germans). Polish presence in Luxembourg dates back to the turn of the 19th and 20th centuries.

== History ==
Historical population
| Year | Pop. | ±% |
|---|---|---|
| 1939 | 3,750 | — |
| 2011 | 2,709 | −27.8% |
| 2020 | 4,844 | +78.8% |

The first Poles migrated to Luxembourg, mostly from the Prussian and Austrian partitions of Poland, at the turn of the 19th and 20th centuries. In the interwar period, immigration of Poles to Luxembourg increased, mainly those forced to leave Westphalia and Rhineland, while some came from Belgium, France and Poland. In the mid-1920s, there were 5,000 Poles in Luxembourg, however, by 1939 the number dropped to 3,750.

During World War II, many Poles from Luxembourg joined the Polish Armed Forces in the West to fight against Nazi Germany, whereas some attempted to return to Poland, but many of them were captured by the Germans and sent to forced labour. According to German data from December 1940, there were 1,158 Poles (including 135 Polish Jews) in German-occupied Luxembourg. The Germans also brought Poles from German-occupied Poland to forced labour in Luxembourg. In 1942, Polish Jews from Luxembourg were deported to extermination camps. After the Liberation of Luxembourg, there were some 2,000 Poles in Luxembourg, including 600 displaced persons (excluding the military).

After the war, in September 1945, an agreement was signed to repatriate Poles from Luxembourg to Poland, and Luxembourgers from Poland to Luxembourg. Repatriation took place in the following years.

== See also ==
- Luxembourg–Poland relations
- Polish diaspora
- Demographics of Luxembourg
- Poles in Belgium
- Poles in France
- Poles in Germany
- Poles in the Netherlands

== Bibliography ==
- Banaś, Konrad (2018). "Repatriacja Polaków z Luksemburga po II wojnie światowej". Studia Migracyjne – Przegląd Polonijny (in Polish). XLIV (1). Uniwersytet Jagielloński. ISSN 2081-4488.
