= Polonophile =

Person who appreciates Poland's culture

The flag of Poland with the Polish coat of arms

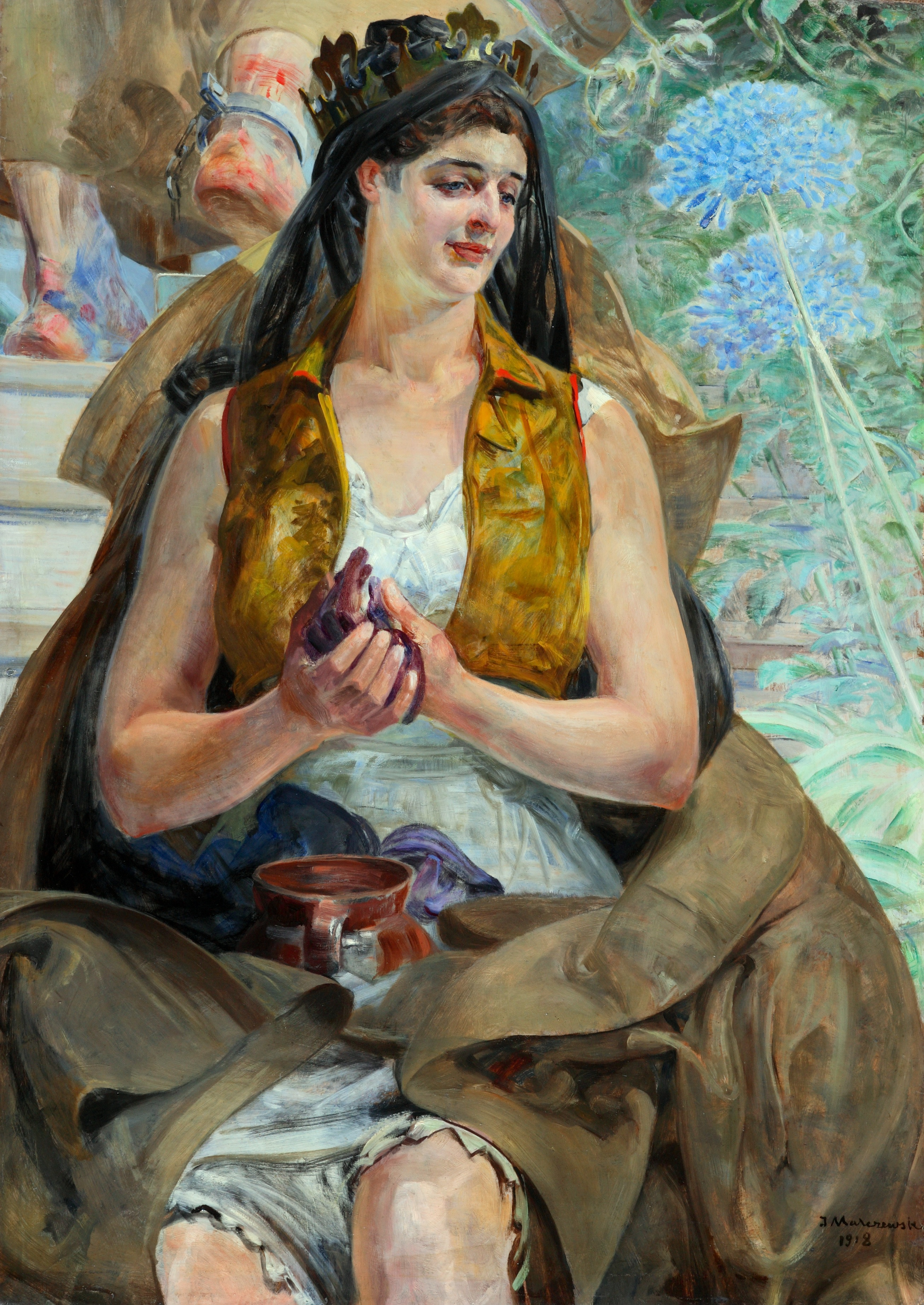
National personification of Poland, Polonia, by Jacek Malczewski

A Polonophile is an individual who respects and is fond of Poland's culture as well as Polish history, traditions and customs. The term defining this kind of attitude is Polonophilia. The antonym and opposite of Polonophilia is Polonophobia.

== History ==
=== Duchy and Kingdom of Poland ===
The history of the concept dates back to the beginning of the Polish state in 966 AD under Duke Mieszko I. It remained strong among ethnic minorities as in allied neighbouring countries and during Polonization of the Eastern Borderlands, Livonia and other acquired territories implied by the Polish Crown or the Polish government, thus also triggering Polonophobia.

One of the first recorded potential Polonophiles were exiled Jews, who settled in Poland throughout the Middle Ages, particularly following the First Crusade (1096-1099). The culture and the intellectual output of the Jewish community in Poland had a profound impact on Judaism as a whole over the next centuries, with both cultures becoming somewhat interconnected and being influenced by each other. Jewish historians claimed that the name of the country is pronounced as "Polania" or "Polin" in Hebrew, which was interpreted as a good omen because Polania can be divided into three separate Hebrew words: po (here), lan (dwells), ya (God) and Polin into two words: po (here) lin ([you should] dwell). That suggested that Poland was a good destination for the Jews fleeing from persecution and anti-Semitism in other European countries. Rabbi David HaLevi Segal (Taz) expressed his pro-Polish views by stating in Poland, "most of the time the Gentiles do no harm; on the contrary they do right by Israel" (Divre David; 1689). Ashkenazi Jews willingly adopted some aspects of Polish cuisine, language and national dress, which can be seen in Orthodox Jewish communities around the world.

=== Polish–Lithuanian Commonwealth ===
The flag of Tartu in Estonia, which was granted to the city by Polish King Stephen Bathory in 1584, is still in use. It closely resembles the Polish flag and represents Poland's historical influence over Livonia

When Polish King Stephen Bathory captured Livonia (Truce of Jam Zapolski), he granted the city of Tartu (Polish: Dorpat), now in Estonia, its own banner with the colours and layout resembling the Polish flag. The flag dates from 1584 and is still in use.

When the Poles invaded the Tsardom of Russia in 1605, a self-identified prince, known as False Dmitry I, assumed the Russian throne. A Polonophile, he assured that King Sigismund III of Poland could control the country's internal and external affairs, secure Russia's conversion to Catholicism and thus make it a puppet state. Dmitry's murder was a possible justification for arranging a full-scale invasion by Sigismund in 1609. The Seven Boyars deposed reigning Tsar Boris Godunov to demonstrate their support for the Polish cause. Godunov was transported as a prisoner to Poland, where he died. In 1610, the Boyars elected Sigismund's underage son Władysław as the new Tsar of Russia, but he was never crowned. This period was known as the Time of Troubles, a major part in Russian history that remains relatively unmentioned in Polish historiography because of its implied Polonization policies.

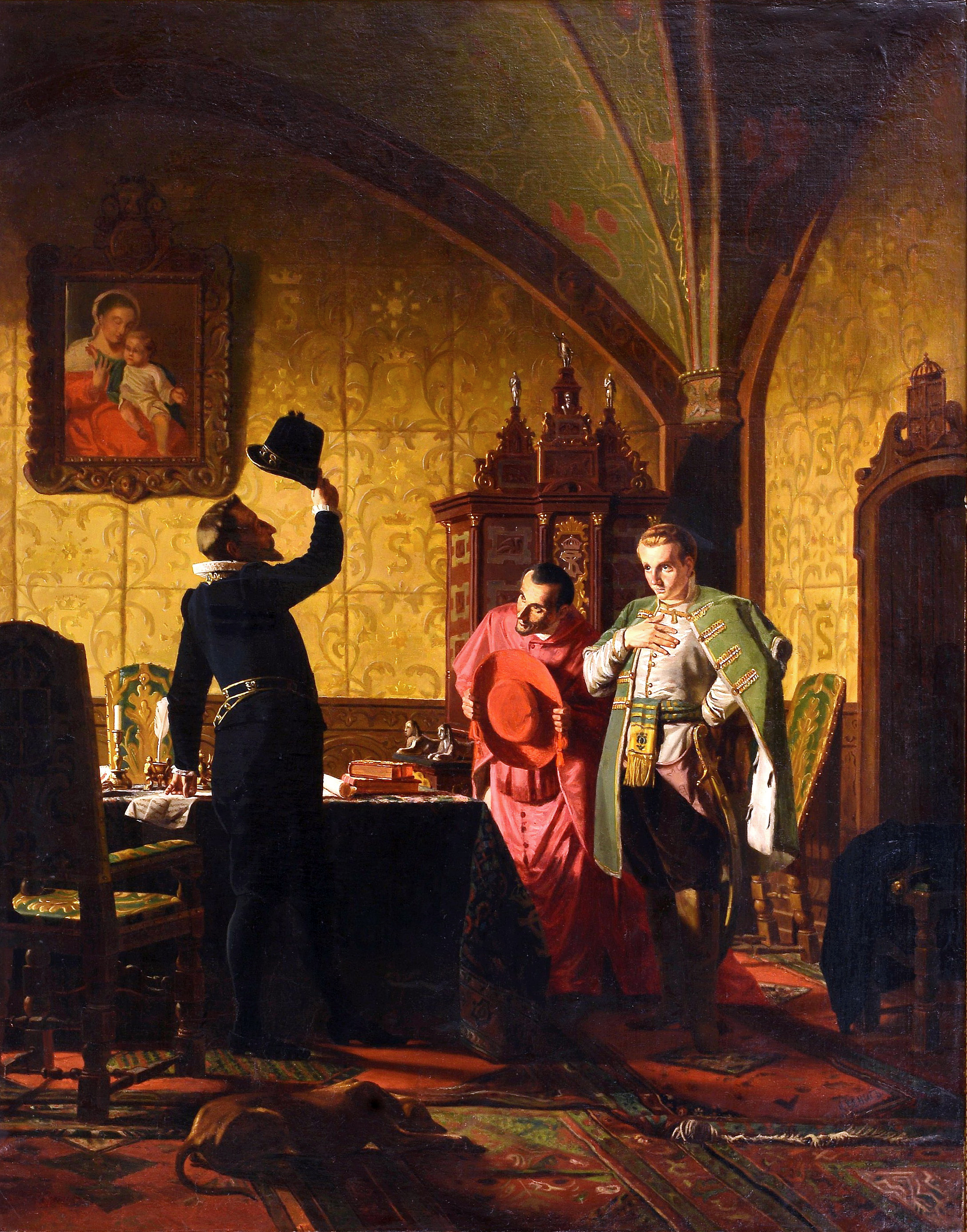
False Dmitry I swears an oath of allegiance to Sigismund III of Poland and promises conversion to Catholicism.

During the Polish–Lithuanian Commonwealth, the Zaporizhian Cossack state was allied to the Catholic King of Poland, and the Cossacks were often hired as mercenaries. That had a strong impact on the Ukrainian language and led to the establishment of a functioning Ukrainian Greek Catholic Church in 1596 at the Union of Brest. The Ukrainians, however, retained their Orthodox Christian faith and Cyrillic alphabet. During the Russo-Polish War of 1654–1667, the Cossacks were divided into the pro-Polish (Right-bank Ukraine) and pro-Russian (Left-bank Ukraine) factions. Petro Doroshenko, who commanded the army of Right-bank Ukraine, and Pavlo Teteria and Ivan Vyhovsky were open Polonophiles and allied to the Polish king. The Polish influence on Ukraine ended with the partitions of the late 18th century, when the territory of contemporary Ukraine was annexed by the Russian Empire.

Under John III Sobieski, the Christian coalition forces defeated the Ottoman Turks at the Battle of Vienna in 1683, which ironically sparked admiration for Poland and its Winged Hussars in the Ottoman Empire. The Sultan named Sobieski the "Lion of Lehistan [Poland]". It also sparked admiration in Persia, with the Persians granting Sobieski the proud title of Ghazi. That tradition was cultivated when Poland disappeared from map for 123 years. The Ottoman Empire, along with Persia, was the only major country in the world not to recognise the Partitions of Poland. The reception ceremony of a foreign ambassador or a diplomatic mission in Istanbul began with an announcement sacred formula: "the Ambassador of Lehistan [Poland] has not yet arrived".

=== After Partitions ===
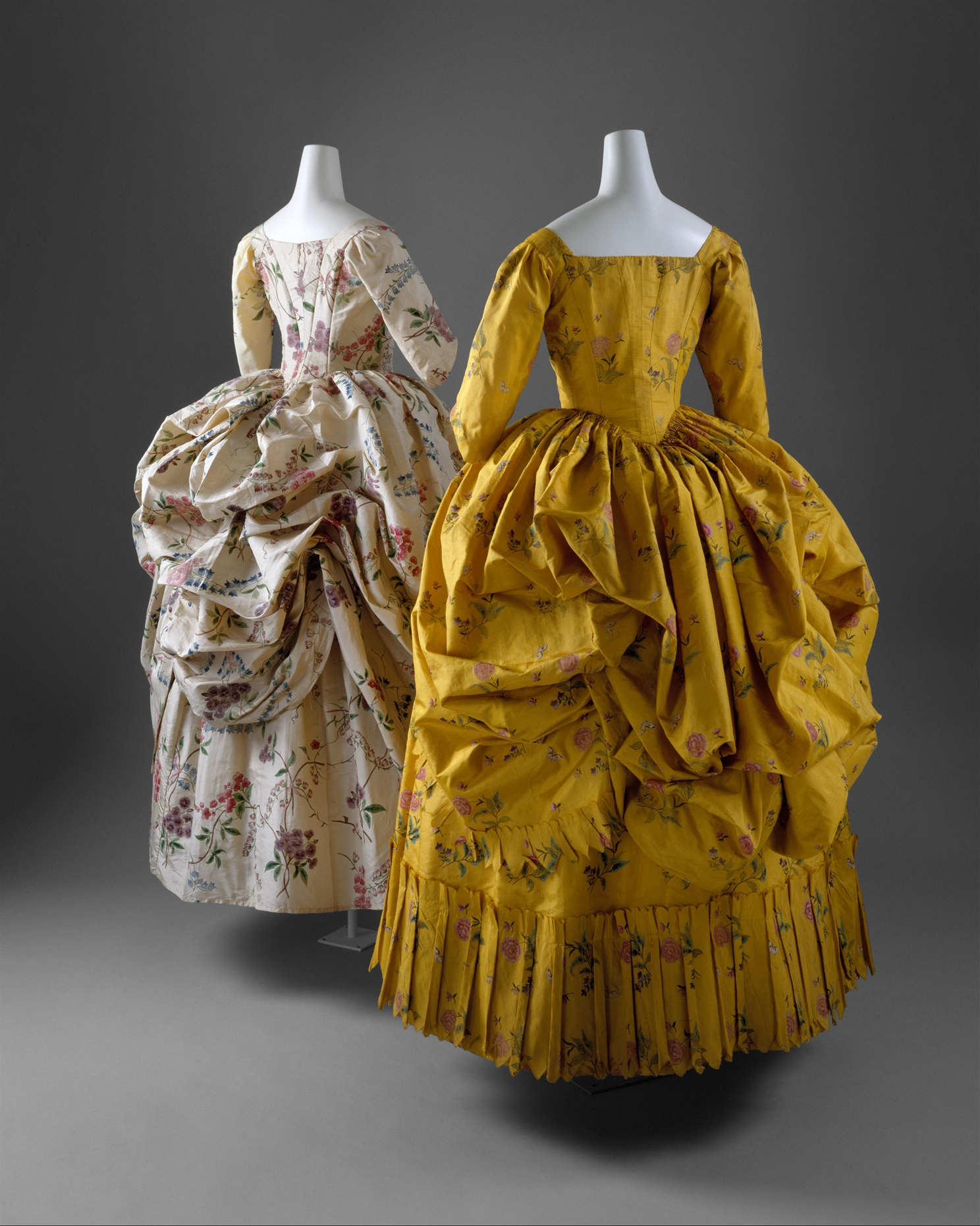
Robe à la polonaise, a Polish dress popular at Versailles in the 18th century and worn by Marie Antoinette

The Partitions of Poland gave a rise to a new wave of Polonophilia in Europe and the world. Exiled revolutionaries such as Casimir Pulaski and Tadeusz Kościuszko, who fought for the independence of the United States from Great Britain, contributed to the sentiment that is relatively pro-Polish in North America.

In Haiti, the leader of the Haitian Revolution and first head of state Jean-Jacques Dessalines, called the Poles the white Negroes of Europe. This was an expression of respect and empathy for the situation of the Poles, after Polish soldiers sent by Napoleon to suppress the Haitian Revolution defected to join the insurgents (see Haiti–Poland relations). The 1805 Haitian constitution granted the Poles Haitian citizenship.

Newly established Belgium, which declared independence from the Netherlands, was a very Polonophile country (see Belgium–Poland relations). Belgian diplomacy refused to establish diplomatic relations with the Russian Empire for annexing a large portion of Poland's eastern territories during the Partitions. Diplomatic relations between Moscow and Brussels were established only decades later.

The November Uprising in Congress Poland in 1830 against Russia prompted a wave of Polonophilia in Germany (excluding the partitioning state of Prussia), including financial contributions to exiles, the singing of pro-Polish songs, and pro-Polish literature. During the January uprising in 1863, however, the pro-Polish sentiment had mostly vanished.

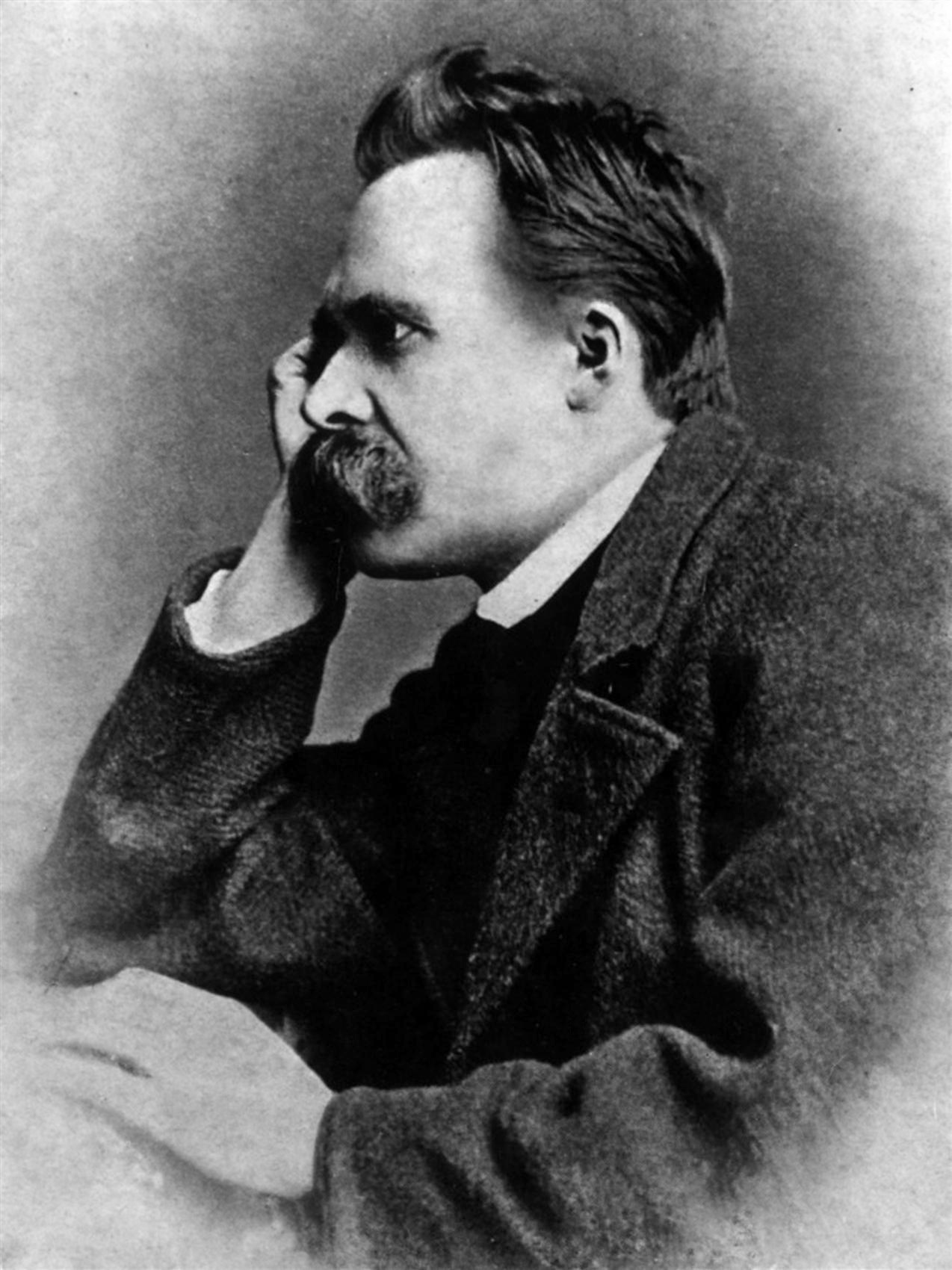
German philosopher Friedrich Nietzsche was a lifelong Polonophile and supported Poland in every field.

One of the strongest centres of Polonophilia in 19th-century Europe was Ireland. The Young Ireland movement and the Fenians saw similarities in both countries as "Catholic nations and victims of larger imperial powers". In 1863, Irish newspapers expressed wide support for the January uprising, which was then seen as a risky move.

Italians and Hungarians supported the Poles in the January Uprising most numerously (see Hungary and Italy sections below), but other nations also showed sympathy for the uprising. In Sweden, various newspapers sympathized with the Poles, with some stating that Russia was a common enemy of Sweden and Poland, pro-Polish rallies were held, attended by Swedish parliamentarians, and funds were collected for arms for the Polish insurgents. Swedish King Charles XV strongly supported Swedish involvement in the fight on the Polish side, which, however, did not take place due to the restrained stance of the Swedish government, which declared willingness to fight for Poland only alongside Western European powers of Britain and France. An expedition of armed Polish volunteers from Western Europe assisted by foreigners of various nationalities, which stopped on the island of Öland and in Malmö on its way to Poland, was met with sympathy of the local Swedes.

Throughout modern history, France was long Poland's ally, especially after French King Louis XV married Polish Princess Marie Leszczyńska, the daughter of Stanislaus I. Polish customs and fashion became popular in the Versailles such as the Polonaise dress (robe à la polonaise), which was adored by Marie Antoinette. Polish cuisine also became known in French as à la polonaise. Both Napoleon I and Napoleon III expressed strong pro-Polish sentiment after Poland had ceased to exist as a sovereign country in 1795. In 1807, Napoleon I established the Duchy of Warsaw, a client state of the French Empire that was dissolved in 1815 at the Congress of Vienna. Napoleon III also called for a free Poland and his wife, Eugénie de Montijo, astonished the Austrian ambassador (Austria was one of three partitioning powers) by "unveiling a European map with a realignment of borders to accommodate independent Poland".

The closely related Sorbs, who were also under Polish rule in the Middle Ages, sympathised with the Poles and viewed them as allies in the resistance against Germanisation policies. 19th-century Sorbian activist Michał Hórnik declared his sympathy and admiration for the Poles, popularised knowledge of Nicolaus Copernicus and Tadeusz Kościuszko through Sorbian press, reported on the events of the January Uprising and made contacts with Poles during visits to Warsaw, Kraków and Poznań.

One of the most prominent and self-declared Polonophiles of the late 19th century was the German philosopher Friedrich Nietzsche, who was certain of his Polish heritage. He often expressed his positive views and admiration towards Poles and their culture. However, modern scholars believe that Nietzsche's claim of Polish ancestry was a pure invention. According to biographer R. J. Hollingdale, Nietzsche's propagation of the Polish ancestry myth may have been part of his "campaign against Germany".

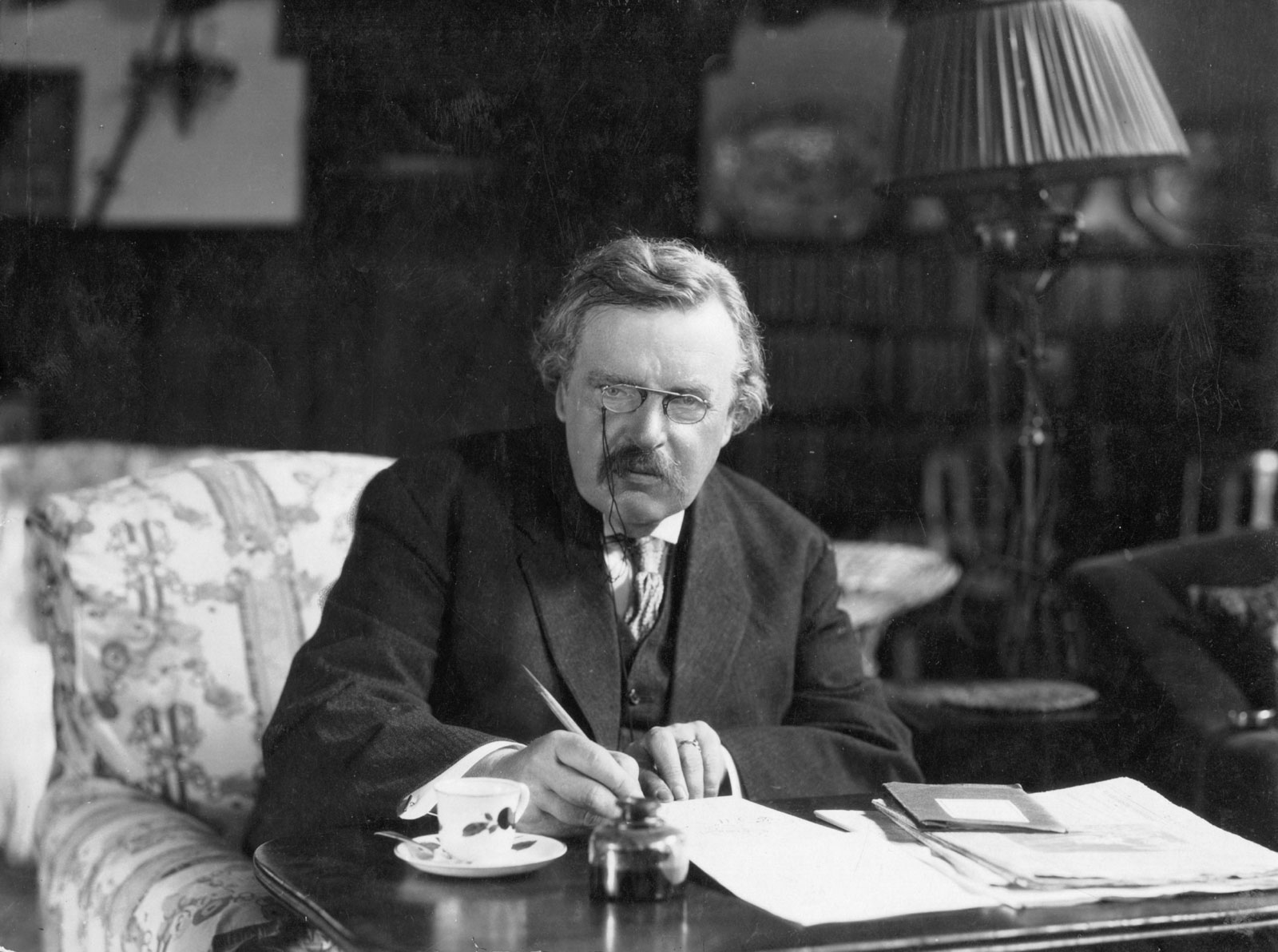
English writer G. K. Chesterton expressed his admiration for the Polish nation

In the early 20th century, a number of writers declared their admiration for the Poles, including Brazil's Ruy Barbosa, Japan's Nitobe Inazō and Britain's G. K. Chesterton. Nitobe Inazō called Poles a brave and chivalrous nation, and valued Polish devotion to history and patriotism. Ruy Barbosa advocated for Polish independence at the Hague Conventions of 1907.

I judged the Poles by their enemies. And I found it was an almost unfailing truth that their enemies were the enemies of magnanimity and manhood. If a man loved slavery, if he loved usury, if he loved terrorism and all the trampled mire of materialistic politics, I have always found that he added to these affections the passion of a hatred of Poland. She could be judged in the light of that hatred; and the judgment has proved to be right.

— G. K. Chesterton

A display of sympathy and gratitude towards Poland in Bulgaria was the unveiling of a memorial complex and symbolic mausoleum of King Władysław III of Poland in Varna. Władysław III commanded a coalition of Central and Eastern European countries at the Battle of Varna in 1444 in an attempt to repel the Ottoman invasion of Europe and liberate Bulgaria. Also, football club SK Vladislav Varna, the first ever Bulgarian football champion, was named after the Polish king.

=== Following the restoration of Polish independence ===
When Poland finally regained its independence following World War I, Polonophilia gradually transformed into a demonstration of patriotism and solidarity, especially during the horrors of the Second World War and the Polish struggle against communism.

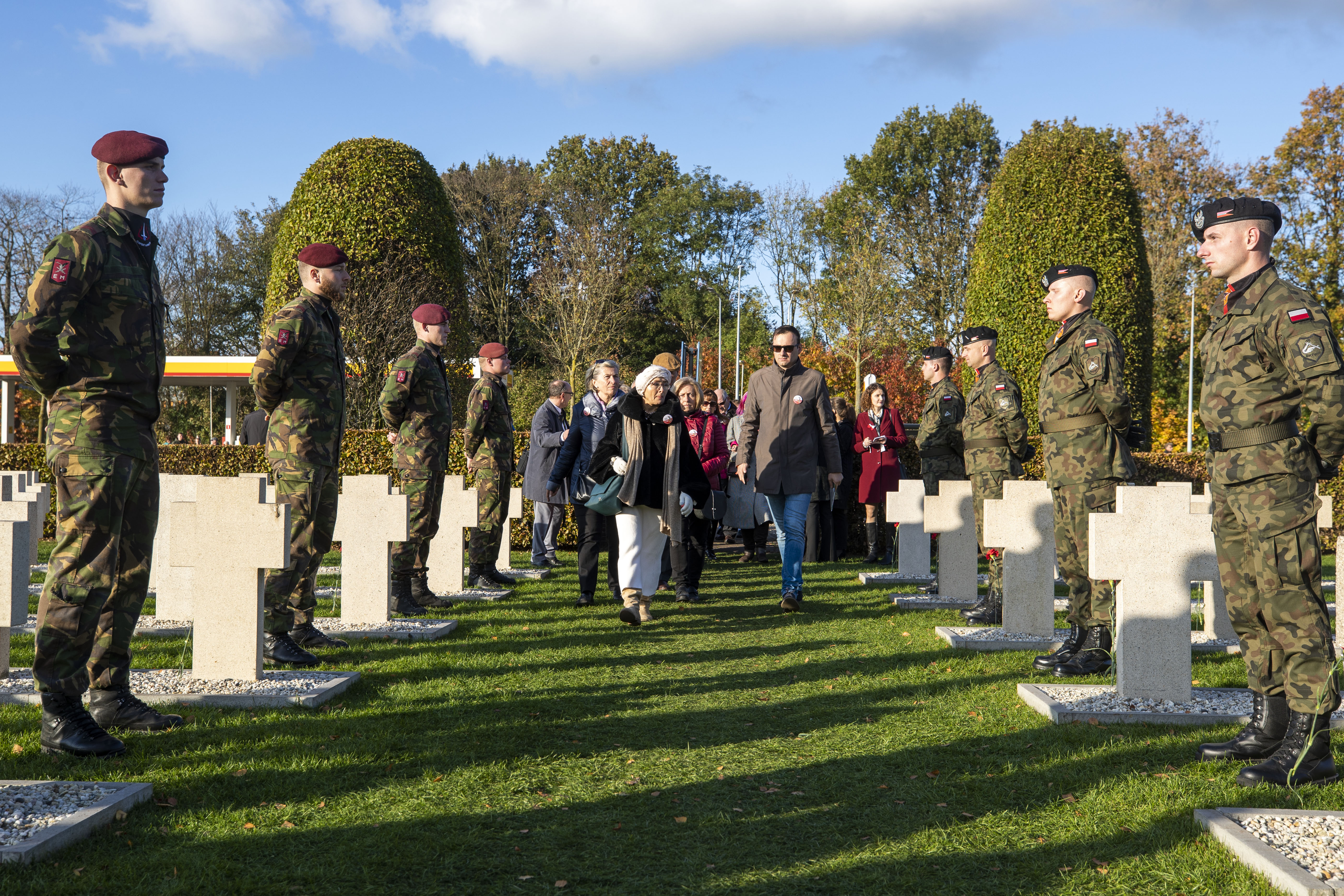
Celebration of the 75th anniversary of the liberation of Breda by the Polish 1st Armoured Division (2019)

In 1939, Germany's allies, traditionally Poland-friendly Italy, Japan and Hungary, did not approve of the German invasion of Poland, which started World War II. Despite declared neutrality and German and Soviet pressure, Hungary, Romania, Italy, Bulgaria, Greece and Yugoslavia sympathized with Poland and secretly allowed the escape of Poles through their territories to Polish-allied France, where the Polish Army was reconstituted to continue the fight against Germany. Eventually, Greece and Yugoslavia, fearing Germany, became reluctant to further allow Poles to escape through their territories, however Bulgaria and Turkey allowed the escape through their lands to continue. The Japanese helped secretly evacuate a portion of the Polish gold reserve from occupied Poland and closely co-operated with Polish intelligence. Mahatma Gandhi declared appreciation for the Polish resistance against the German invasion.

Polish troops took part in the liberation of a number of nations from German occupation, which is, for example, particularly strongly remembered in Breda in the Netherlands. There is a Polish military cemetery, where Polish general and war hero Stanisław Maczek is buried, and the anniversary of the liberation is commemorated in the city, also by supporters of the local football club NAC Breda (see Netherlands–Poland relations).

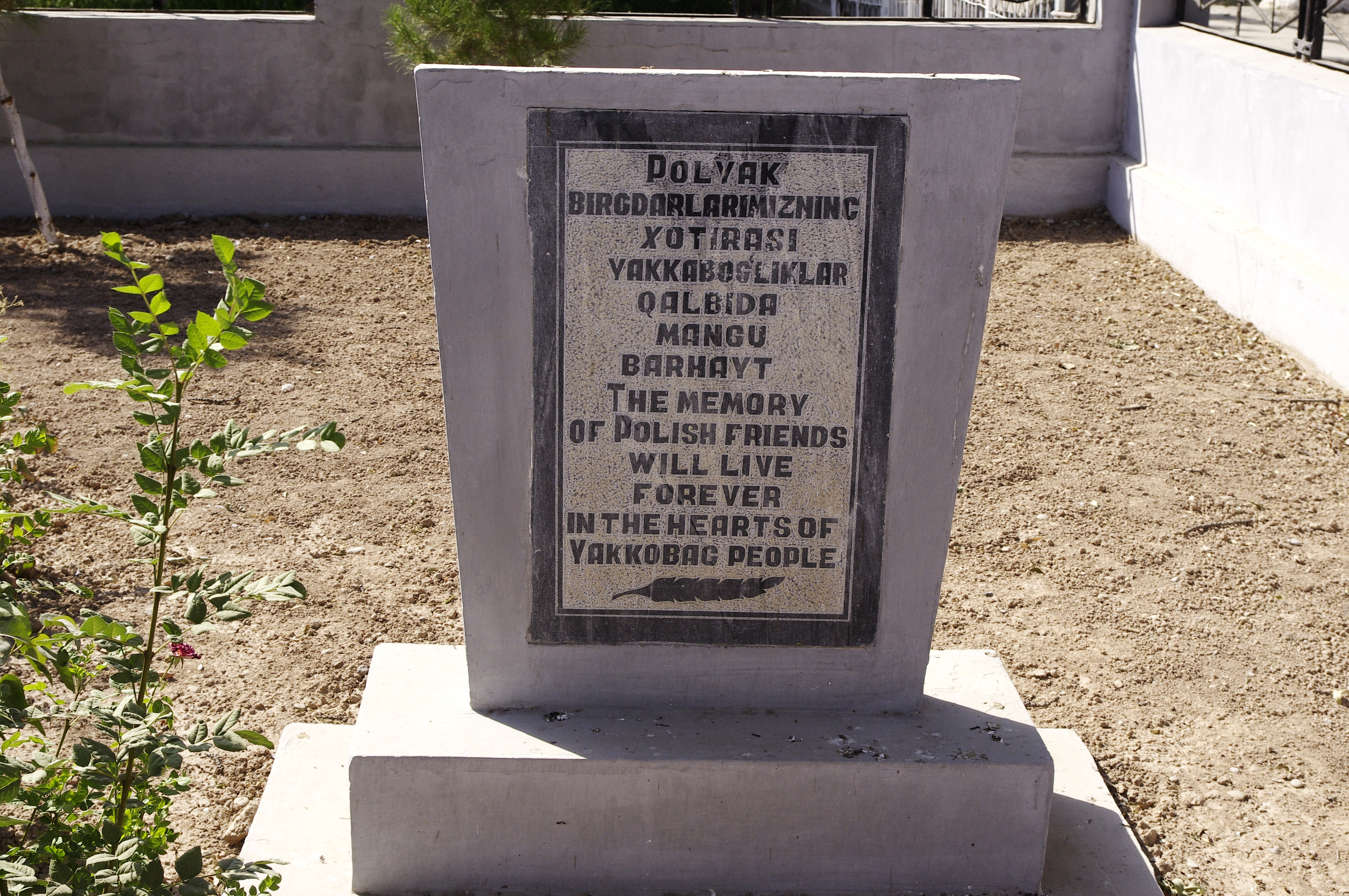
The memory of Polish friends will live forever in the hearts of Yakkabog people, inscription at the Polish cemetery in Yakkabogʻ, Uzbekistan

Several people who had contact with the Polish resistance praised the Poles. Ron Jeffery, British prisoner of war who escaped from German captivity in occupied Poland and joined the Polish resistance, stated in his memoirs that People of more matchless moral and physical courage than the Poles have never existed, and a sense of pride at having fought and been closely associated with them in their scarce unbroken struggles, is always with me. Australian Walter Edward Smith, who similarly escaped from German captivity and joined the Polish resistance, declared that Poles, not Australians as he previously believed, were the best soldiers in the world.

Despite Soviet rule, Polish cemeteries and graves from World War II in Uzbekistan have mostly survived the post-war period. After the dissolution of the Soviet Union and restoration of independent Uzbekistan, Uzbeks often annotated Polish cemeteries with inscriptions referring to buried Poles as their friends (see Poland–Uzbekistan relations).

In Argentina, 8 June is celebrated as the "Day of the Polish Settler" to honour the contribution of Polish immigrants to Argentina.

== Nations with strong pro-Polish sentiments ==
=== Armenia ===
Armenians in Poland have an important and historical presence which dates back to the 14th century, however, the first Armenian settlers arrived in the 12th century, which makes them the oldest minority in Poland with the Jews. A very significant and independent Armenian diaspora existed in Poland but was assimilated over the centuries because of Polonization and the absorption of Polish culture. Between 40,000 and 80,000 people in Poland today claim Armenian nationality or Armenian heritage. Mass waves of Armenian immigration to Poland has occurred since the collapse of the Soviet Union in 1991.

Armenians are highly fond of Polish culture and history. Several Armenian cultural features also exist in the Polish national dress, most notably the Karabela sabre introduced by Armenian merchants under Poland-Lithuania.

There are khachkars commemorating Armenian-Polish friendship in Zamość, Szczecinek and Zabrze in Poland, and Yerevan in Armenia.

=== Georgia ===
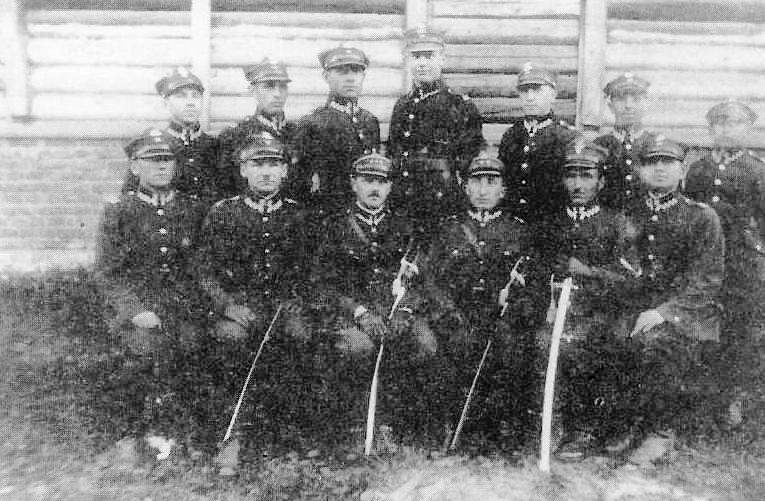
Georgian soldiers in the Polish army, 1925

Many Georgians participated in military campaigns that were led by Poland in the 17th century. Bogdan Gurdziecki, an ethnic Georgian, became the Polish king's ambassador to the Middle East and made frequent diplomatic trips to Persia to represent Polish interests. As both nations shared a similar fate, with Poland partitioned by Russia, Prussia and Austria in the late 18th century, and Georgia annexed by Russia in the 19th century, the two nations had more frequent encounters, particularly as a result of Russian deportations of Poles to Georgia and Georgians to Poland. Both nations supported each other's independence movements, and young Georgians came to study in Warsaw as they considered Poles an inspiration and model for their national liberation activity.

Following the Red Army invasion of Georgia, many Georgian military officers found refuge in Poland and joined the Polish Army. They later fought in Polish defense during the joint German-Soviet invasion of Poland at the start of World War II and afterwards many joined the Polish resistance movement.

During the Russo-Georgian War of 2008, Poland strongly supported Georgia. Polish President Lech Kaczyński flew to Tbilisi to rally against the Russian military intervention and the subsequent military conflict. Several European leaders met with Georgian President Mikheil Saakashvili at Kaczyński's initiative at the rally held on 12 August 2008, which was attended by over 150,000 people. The crowd responded enthusiastically to the Polish president's speech and chanted, "Poland, Poland", "Friendship, Friendship" and "Georgia, Georgia".

The main boulevard in the city of Batumi, Georgia, is named after Lech Kaczyński and his wife, Maria.

=== Hungary ===
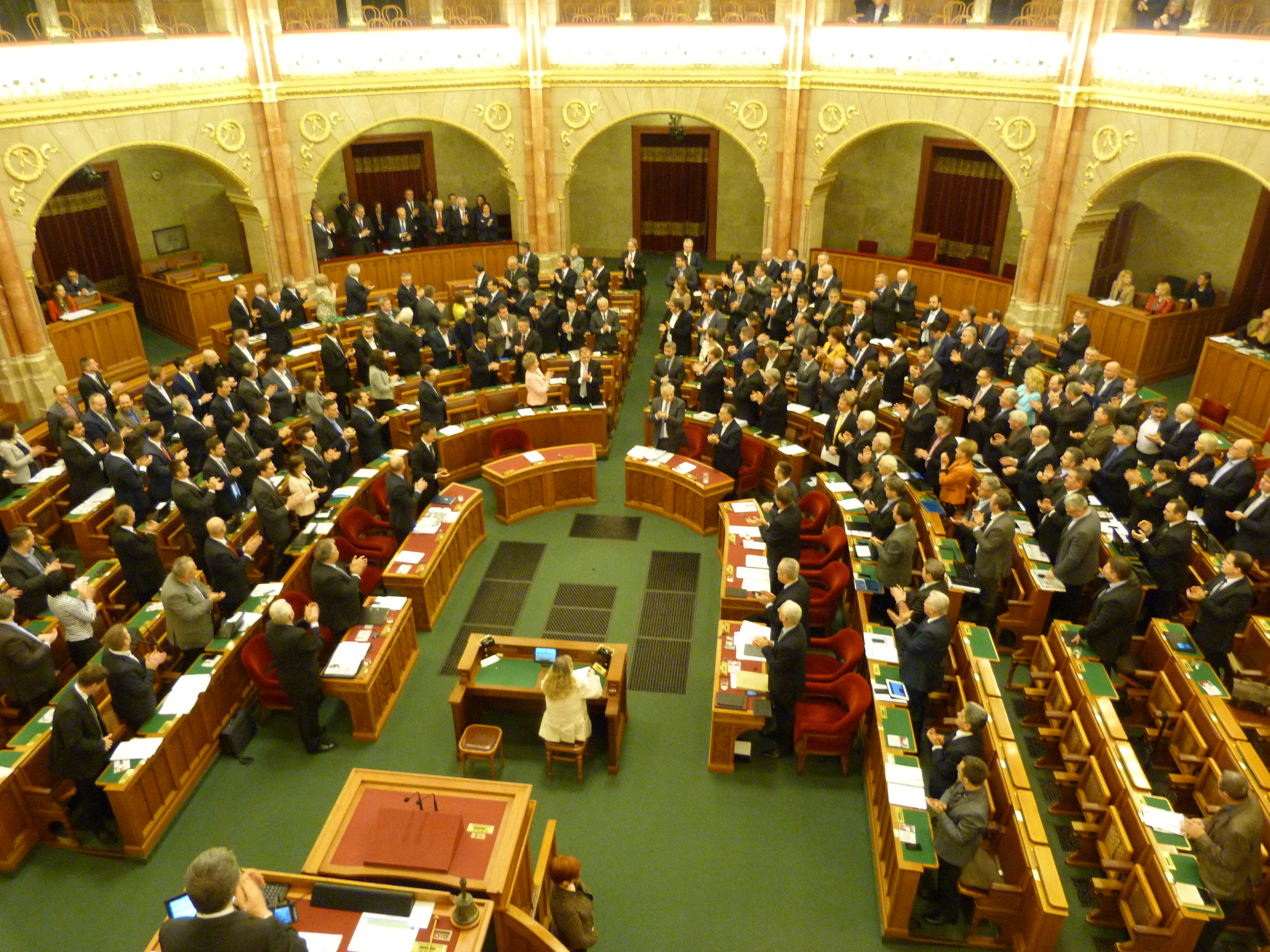
A standing ovation by Hungarian MPs after the Hungarian Parliament declared 2016 to be the Year of the Hungarian–Polish Solidarity and Friendship. The countries have sustained a 1000-year diplomatic relation and Friendship Day is celebrated in Hungary and Poland on 23 March.

Hungary and Poland have enjoyed good relations since the inauguration of diplomatic relations between the two countries in the Middle Ages. Hungary and Poland have maintained a very close friendship and brotherhood "rooted in a deep history of shared monarchs, cultures, and common faith". Both countries commemorate a fraternal relationship and Friendship Day.

Poles and Hungarians have repeatedly supported each other's national liberation uprisings, including the Polish November Uprising, January Uprising and Warsaw Uprising and Hungarian Rákóczi's War of Independence, Revolution of 1848 and Revolution of 1956. After the fall of the Rákóczi's War of Independence, Poland took in fugitive Hungarian insurgents, including its leader Francis II Rákóczi, and following the fall of the January Uprising, Hungary received Polish refugees. Polish general Józef Bem is considered a national hero in Hungary, and is commemorated with several monuments.

During the Second World War, Hungary refused to allow Adolf Hitler's troops to pass through the country during the invasion of Poland in September 1939. Although Hungary, which was ruled by Miklós Horthy, was allied with Nazi Germany, it declined to participate in the invasion as a matter of "Hungarian honour".

On 12 March 2007, the Hungarian Parliament declared 23 March as the "Day of Hungarian-Polish Friendship", with 324 votes in favor, none opposed, and no abstentions. Four days later, the Polish Parliament declared 23 March as the "Day of Polish-Hungarian Friendship" by acclamation. The Hungarian Parliament also voted 2016 as the Year of Hungarian-Polish solidarity.

The Hungarian-born Prince Stephen Báthory was elected King of Poland in 1576 and is the primary figure of the close ties between the countries.

=== Italy ===
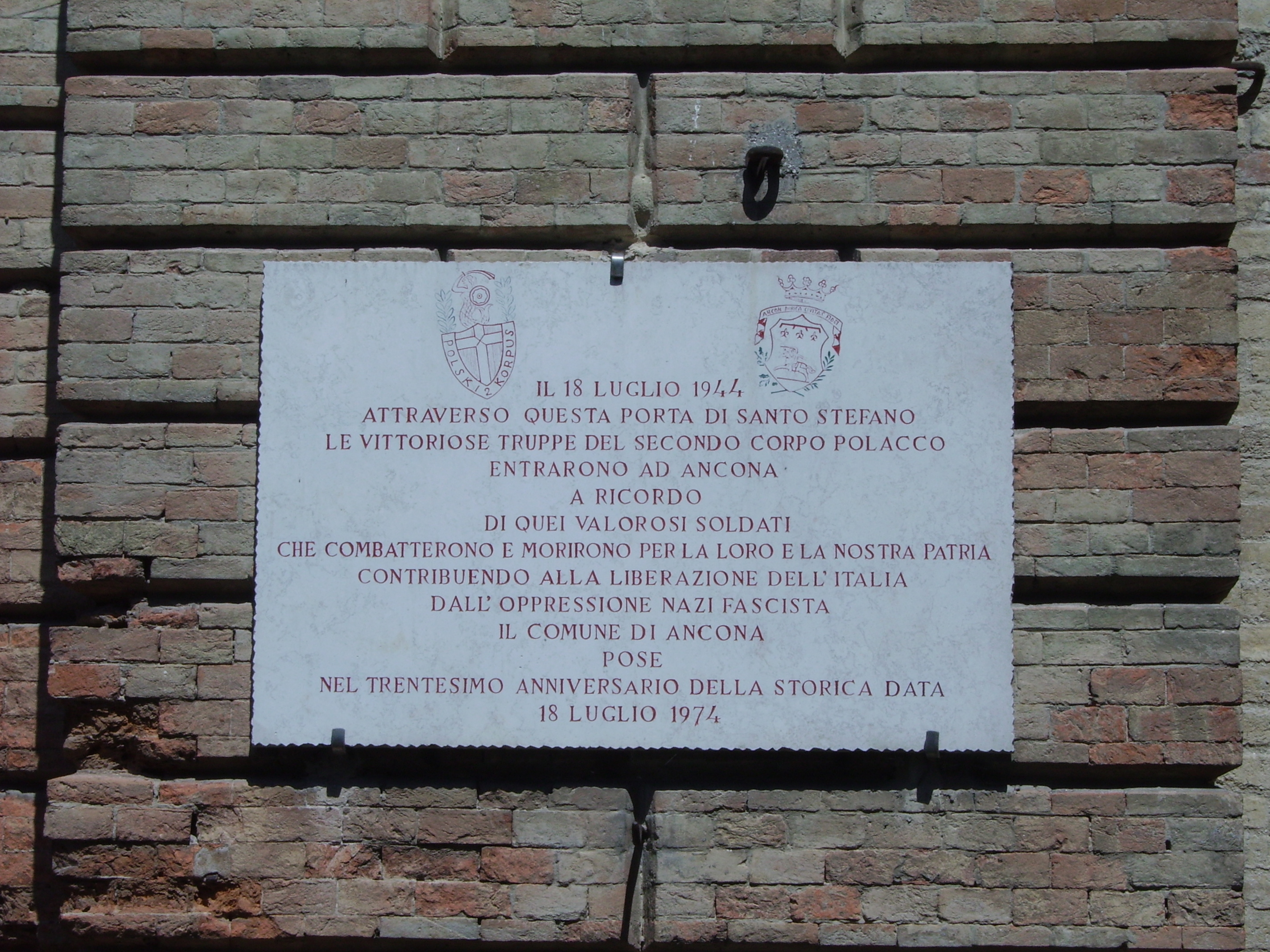
Plaque commemorating the liberation of Ancona by the Polish II Corps in 1944

Italy and Poland shared common historical backgrounds and common enemies (Austria), and a good relationship is maintained to this day. Poles and Italians supported each other's independence struggles. The Poles fought in the First Italian War of Independence and the Expedition of the Thousand, contributing to the birth of a unified Italy. The Italian government subsequently agreed to establish a Polish Military School in Genoa, which trained Polish officers in exile, who then fought in the Polish January Uprising against Russia. Italian volunteers formed the Garibaldi Legion which also fought for Poland's independence in the uprising. Its leader Francesco Nullo was killed at the Battle of Krzykawka in 1863. In Poland, Nullo is a national hero, and numerous streets and schools are named in his honour.

The struggle for a united and sovereign nation was a common goal for both countries and was noticed by Goffredo Mameli, a Polonophile and the author of the lyrics in the Italian national anthem, Il Canto degli Italiani. Mameli featured a prominent statement in the last verse of the anthem, Già l'Aquila d'Austria, le penne ha perdute. Il sangue d'Italia, il sangue Polacco.... ("Already the Eagle of Austria has lost its plumes. The blood of Italy, the Polish blood...").

During World War I, Italy established two POW camps for soldiers of Polish nationality conscripted to the Austrian Army, who were then allowed to leave Italy and join the Polish Blue Army in France to fight for Polish independence. The Italian government and people were friendly towards the Polish troops, and Italian cities gifted banners to the newly formed Polish units in Italy.

Pope John Paul II also greatly contributed to a favourable opinion of the Polish people in Italy and in the Vatican during his pontificate.

=== United States ===
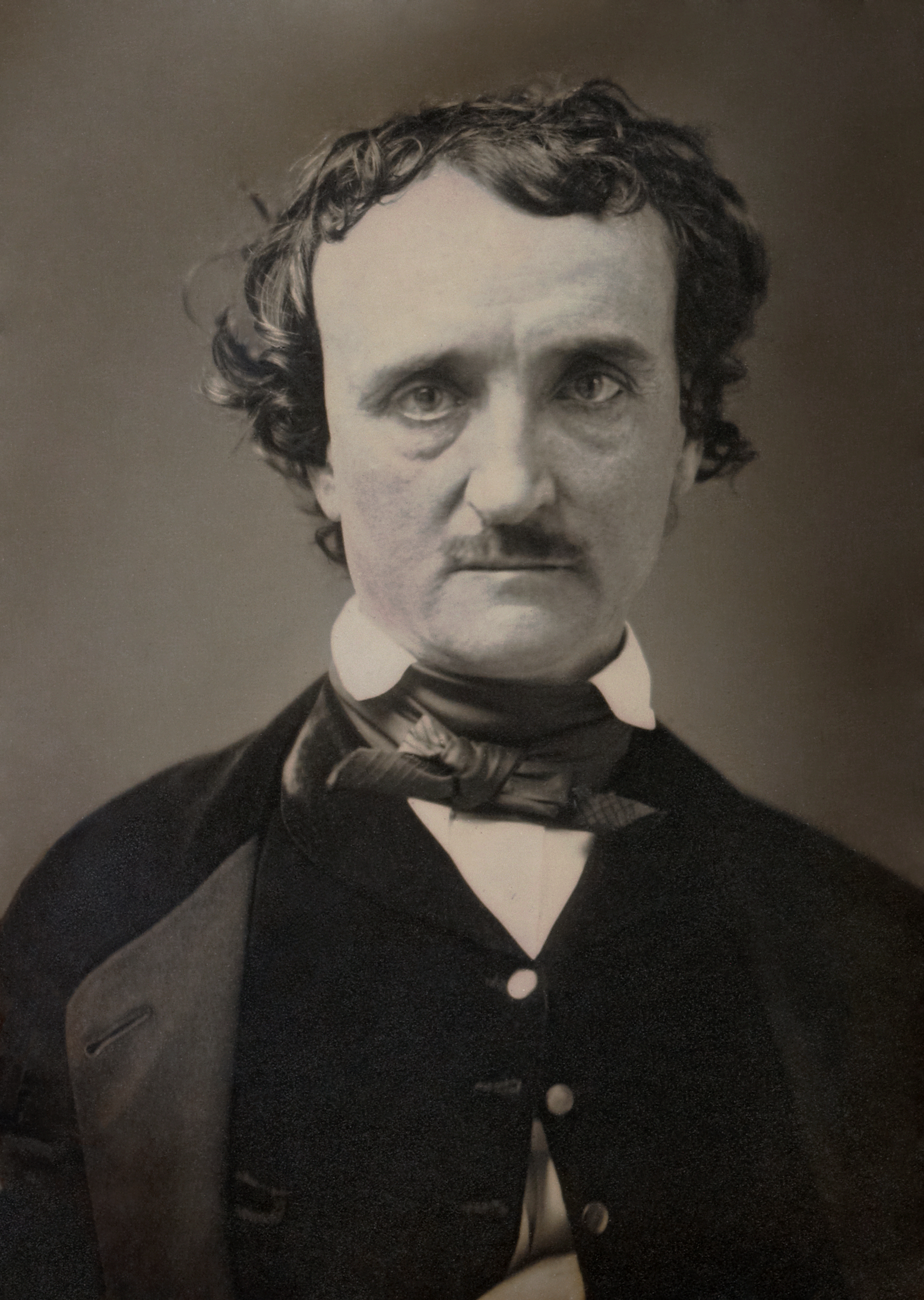
Writer Edgar Allan Poe was a self-declared Polonophile and offered his service in a possible Polish Army to fight for Poland's independence.

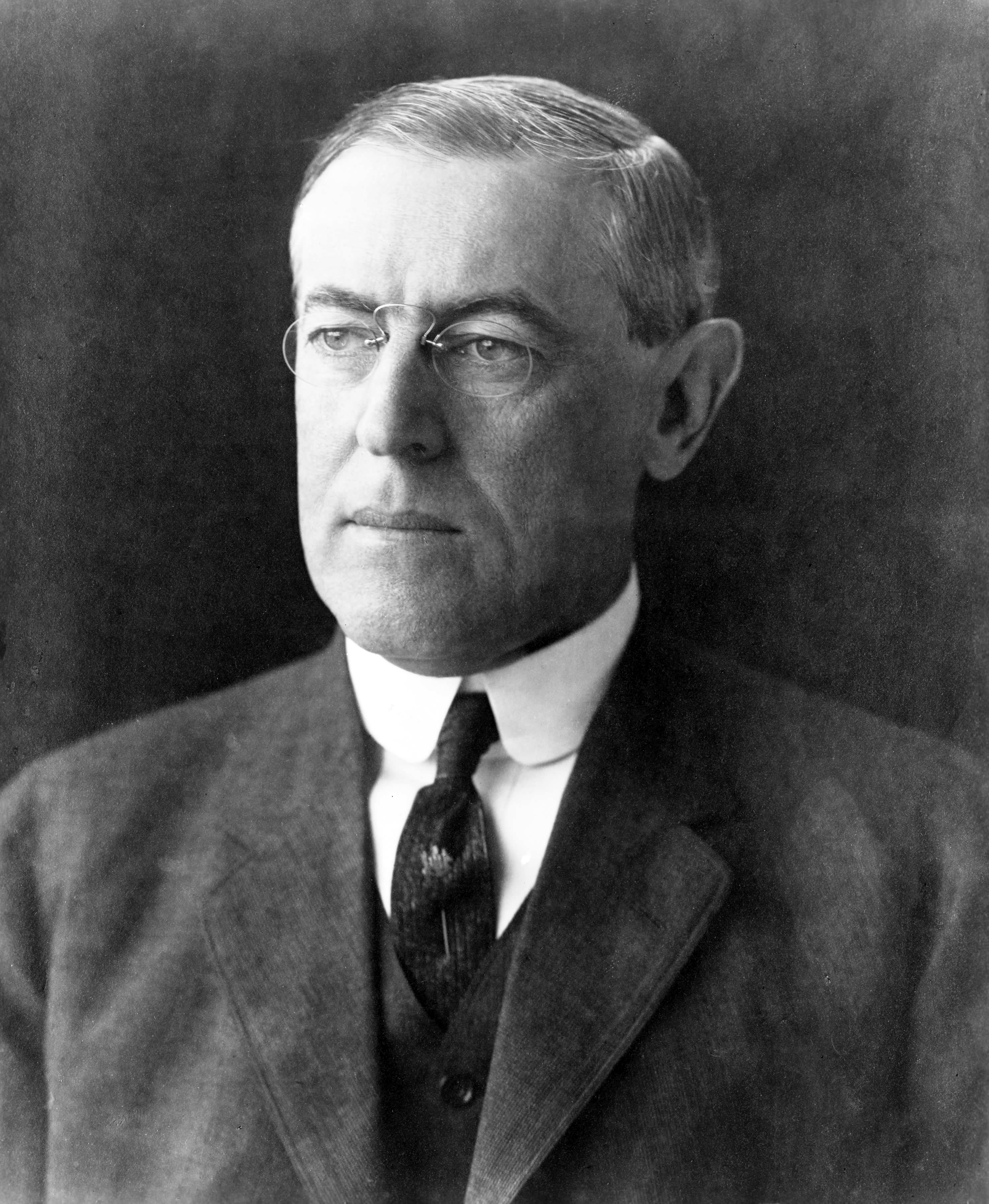
US President Woodrow Wilson presented his Fourteen Points and demanded for a sovereign Poland to be established after World War I.

Tadeusz Kościuszko and Casimir Pulaski, who fought for the independence of the United States and Poland, are seen as the foundation of Polish-American relations. However, the United States began to be involved in Poland's struggle for sovereignty during two uprisings, which took place in the 19th century.

When the November Uprising started in 1830, there were very few Poles in the United States, but American views of Poland were shaped positively by their support for the American Revolution. Several young men offered their military services to fight for Poland, the most well-known of which was Edgar Allan Poe, who wrote a letter to his commanding officer on 10 March 1831 to join the Polish Army if it was created in France. Support for Poland was highest in the South, as Pulaski's death in Savannah, Georgia, was well-remembered and memorialized. The most famous landmark representing American Polonophilia of the time was Fort Pulaski in the State of Georgia.

Włodzimierz Bonawentura Krzyżanowski was another hero who fought at the Battle of Gettysburg and helped to repel the Louisiana Tigers. He was appointed the governor of Alabama, Georgia and served as administrator of Alaska Territory, a high distinction for a foreigner at the time. He had fled Poland after the failed 1848 Greater Poland Uprising.

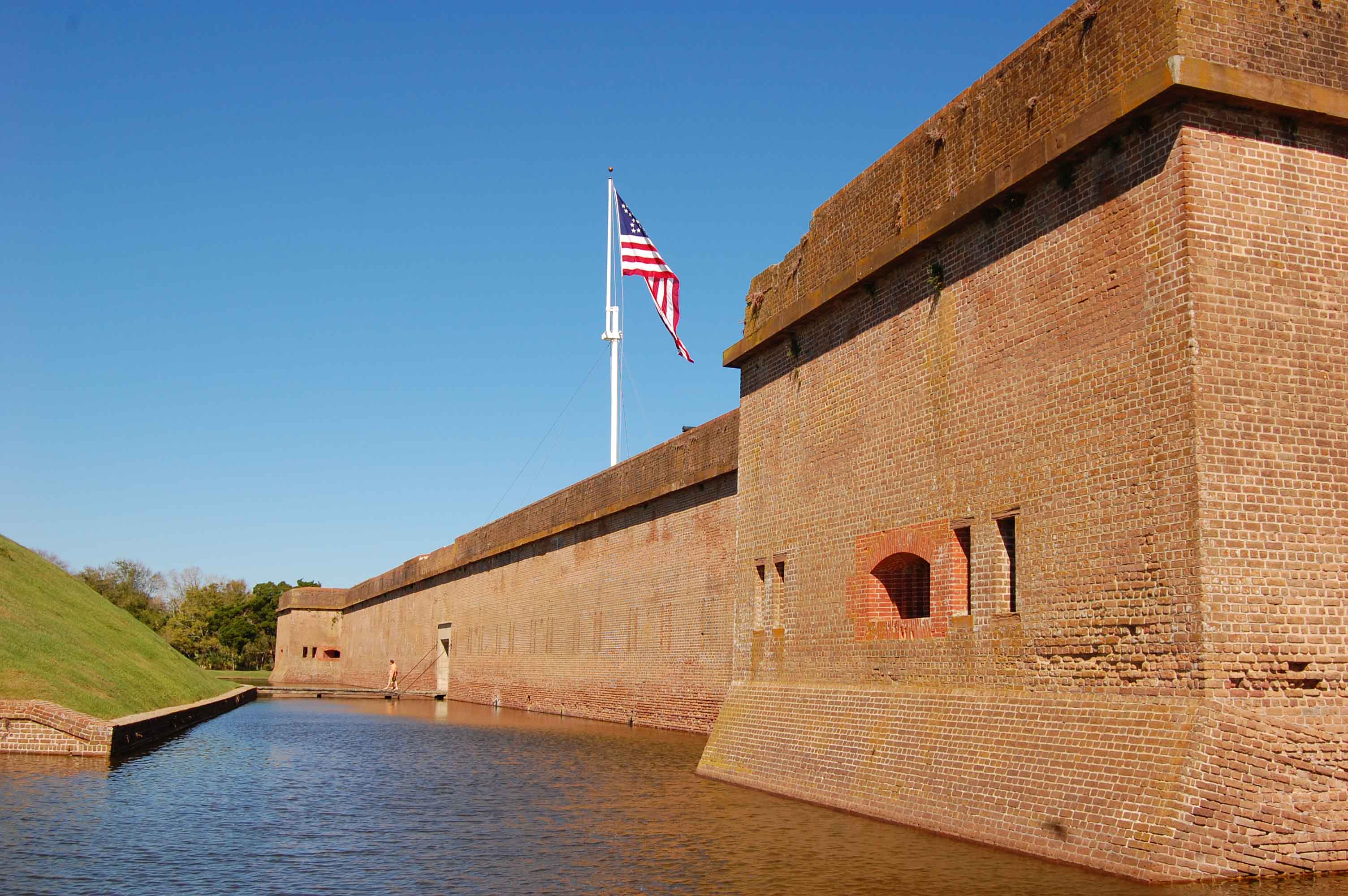
Fort Pulaski National Monument named after Casimir Pulaski

Strong support for Poland and pro-Polish sentiment were also observed by US President Woodrow Wilson. In 1918, delivered his Fourteen Points as peace settlement to end World War I and stated in Point 13 that "an independent Polish state should be erected... with a free and secure access to the sea...".

US President Donald Trump also expressed his sentiment towards Poland and Polish history in his speech in Warsaw on 6 July 2017. Trump spoke highly of the spirit of the Polish for defending the freedom and the independence of the country several times at the speech, notably the unity of Poles against the oppression of communism. He applauded the Poles' prevailing spiritual determination and recalled the gathering of the Poles in 1979 with the famous chant "We want God". Trump also made remarks on Polish economic success and policies towards migrants.

The large Polish-American community maintains some traditional folk customs and contemporary observances, such as Dyngus Day and Pulaski Day, which became well known in American culture. It also includes the influence of Polish cuisine and the spread of famous specialties from Poland like pierogi, kielbasa, Kabana sausage and bagels.

== See also ==
- Polonophobia
- Polish Americans
- History of Poland
- Polonization
