= Filip (bishop of Płock) =

Polish bishop

Filip was an eleventh-century bishop of Płock, Poland.

According to Jan Długosz he was from the Doliwczyków Polish Noble family and was appointed by Pope Paschal II. He is known to history through some papal correspondence, but exact dates for his bishopric are uncertain. He was probably ordained 1099 or 1100 and remained Bishop unto 1007AD or 1112AD.

Religious titles
Preceded by Stefan	Bishop of Płock; 1099/1102-1107/1112	Succeeded by Szymon Gozdawa
