= Walter (bishop of Wrocław) =

Polish bishop

Walter was Bishop of Wrocław, Poland between 1149 and 1169.

Little is known about his origins, career, or his episcopal work. He was a Walloon from the area of Namur. He came to Poland with his brother Aleksander of Malonne, who was appointed Bishop of Płock. During Walter's tenure as bishop, the Premonstratensians founded the St. Martin church, he also dedicated the St. Mary church, undertook some construction at Wrocław Cathedral and the castle in Wleń was built (1155).

== Bibliography ==
- Constantin von Wurzbach: "Lanckoroński, Walcer (Walther)." In: Biographisches Lexikon des Kaiserthums Oesterreich (Biographical Lexicon of the Empire of Austria). Part 14 Kaiserlich-königliche Hof- und Staatsdruckerei, Vienna 1865, p. 68 (digitalised).
- Jan Kopiec. In: Erwin Gatz (Hrsg.): Die Bistümer des Heiligen Römischen Reiches von ihren Anfängen bis zur Säkularisation. Herder, Freiburg im Breisgau 2003, ISBN 3-451-28075-2, S. 130.

Religious titles
Preceded by Johann II	Bishop of Wrocław; 1149–1169	Succeeded by Siroslaus II (Bishop of Wrocław)
