= Szymon h. Gozdawa (bishop of Płock) =

Polish bishop

Szymon
- Bishop of Płock
- Church: Catholic Church
- Diocese: Diocese of Płock
- In office: 1107/1112 – 1129
- Predecessor: Filip
- Successor: Aleksander of Malonne

Orders
- Consecration: by Martin I

Szymon h. Gozdawa, also known as Simon, was a twelfth century Bishop of Płock, Poland.

He was from the Gozdawa noble family and was appointed bishop in 1112 AD. Jan Długosz says of him that he was very devout and ruled the diocese for 21 years until he died in 1129. He was also mentioned by the historian Gallus Anonymus.

Religious titles
Preceded by Filip	Bishop of Płock; 1107/1112-1129	Succeeded by Aleksander of Malonne
