= Pulaski Day =

Pulaski Day can refer to a number of holidays commemorating Polish militia leader Casimir Pulaski

- Casimir Pulaski Day, held on the first Monday of March (coinciding with Pulaski's birthday)
- General Pulaski Memorial Day, held on October 11 (the anniversary of Pulaski's death)
- Pulaski Day (Western New York), held on the third Sunday of July
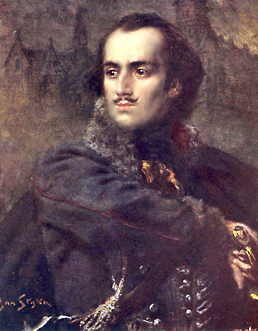
  Image of Kazimierz Pulaski
