= Luxembourg–Poland relations =

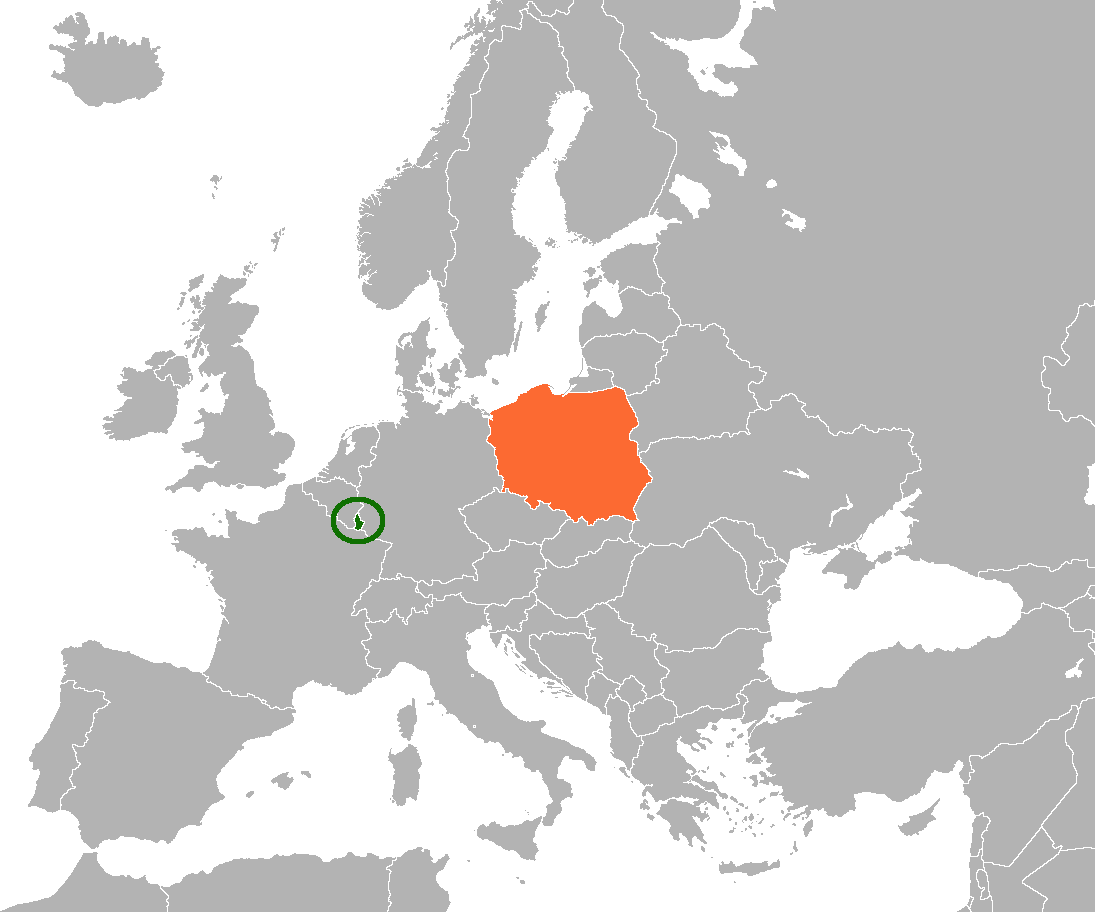

- Luxembourg: Poland

Luxembourg–Poland relations are bilateral relations between Luxembourg and Poland. Relations focus on trade and cultural and scientific cooperation. Both nations are full members of the European Union, NATO, OECD, OSCE, Council of Europe, World Trade Organization and United Nations.

== History ==
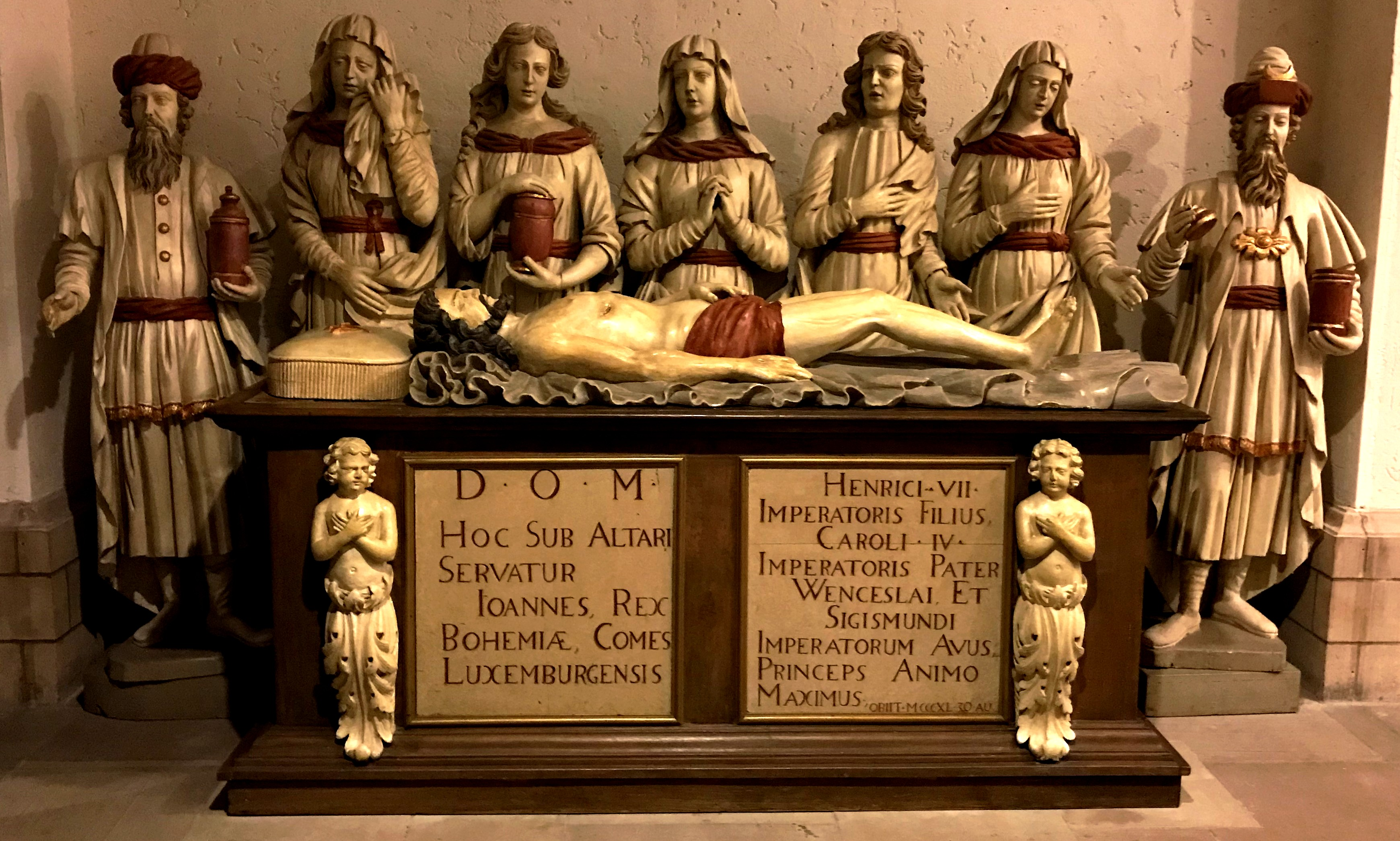
Tomb of John the Blind, King of Bohemia and Count of Luxembourg, who claimed the Polish throne and was titular King of Poland, in Notre-Dame Cathedral, Luxembourg

Despite the considerable difference in area and population, there are several similarities between Luxembourg and Poland. Both Luxembourg and Poland were established almost simultaneously in the 960s, and both are traditionally predominantly Catholic by confession. In the Late Middle Ages, the ruling houses of both states rose to great power in Europe. In 1310 John the Blind of the House of Luxembourg secured the Bohemian throne and attempted to achieve the Polish throne, however, he became only a titular King of Poland. The Polish Jagiellonian dynasty soon rose to similar prominence and also managed to place its members on the throne of the Kingdom of Bohemia (in addition to Hungary). At that time, Luxembourg fell under foreign rule, a fate shared by Poland in the 18th century. Luxembourg eventually regained independence in 1867, and Poland in 1918, although neither nation has recovered all of its former territories, lost in the Partitions of Luxembourg and Partitions of Poland, respectively. First Poles migrated to Luxembourg, mostly from the Prussian and Austrian partitions of Poland, at the turn of the 19th and 20th centuries.

In 1921, bilateral relations were established, and a consulate of Poland was opened in Luxembourg City. In 1922, a trade treaty was signed. Immigration of Poles to Luxembourg increased, mainly those forced to leave Westphalia and Rhineland, while some came from Belgium, France and Poland. In the mid-1920s, there were 5,000 Poles in Luxembourg, however, by 1939 the number dropped to 3,750.

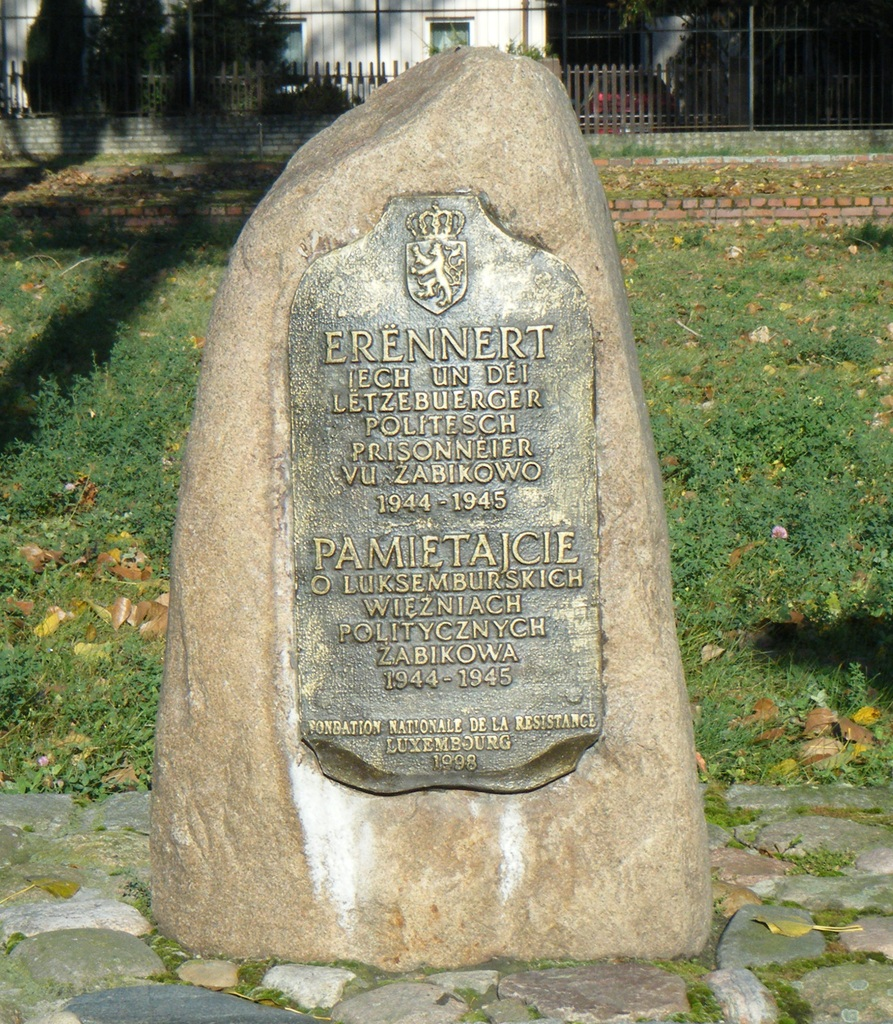
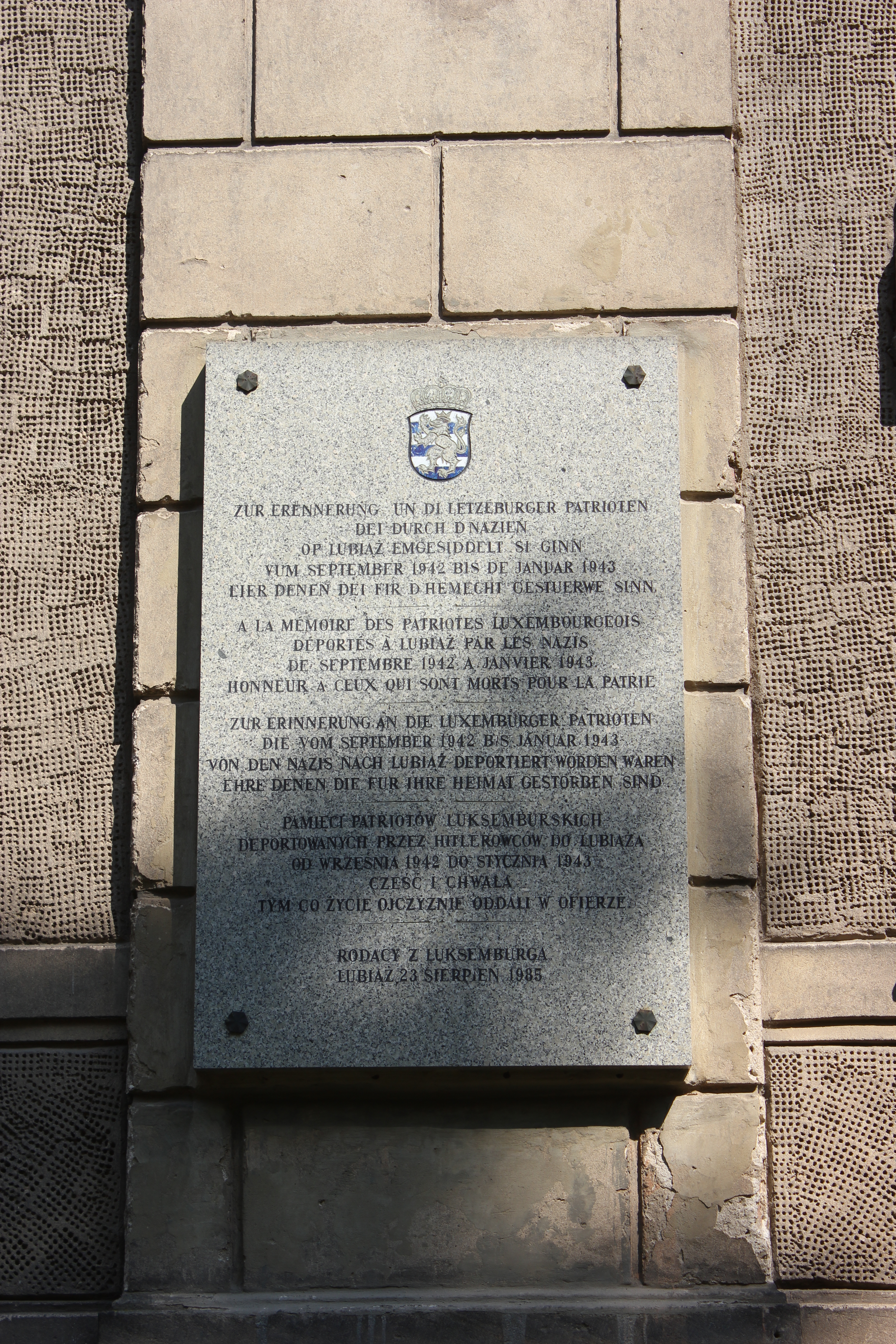
Memorials to Luxembourgish prisoners of Nazi Germany in Luboń and Lubiąż, Poland

During World War II, Poland and Luxembourg were both invaded and occupied by Germany, in 1939 and 1940, respectively. Both countries were subjected to Germanisation policies. Many Poles from Luxembourg joined the Polish Armed Forces in the West to fight against Germany, whereas some attempted to return to Poland, but many of them were captured by the Germans and sent to forced labour. According to German data from December 1940, there were 1,158 Poles (including 135 Polish Jews) in Luxembourg.

The Germans brought Poles from Poland to forced labour in occupied-Luxembourg, whereas Luxembourgers, alike Poles, were imprisoned in concentration camps and forced labour camps in various locations, including Żabikowo, Lubiąż, Słońsk, Jelenia Góra, Krzaczyna and Wojanów, and many died or were murdered there. During the Holocaust, the first deportation of Luxembourgish Jews to the Łódź Ghetto in occupied Poland was conducted by the Germans in 1941. In 1942, Polish Jews from Luxembourg were deported to extermination camps. After the Liberation of Luxembourg, there were some 2,000 Poles in the Luxembourg, including 600 displaced persons (excluding the military). During the war, Poland lost 16.5% of its population and Luxembourg 2.8%.

After the war, in September 1945, Joseph Bech, Minister for Foreign Affairs of Luxembourg, visited Warsaw and an agreement was signed to repatriate Poles from Luxembourg to Poland, and Luxembourgers from Poland to Luxembourg. Repatriation took place in the following years.

== Modern relations ==
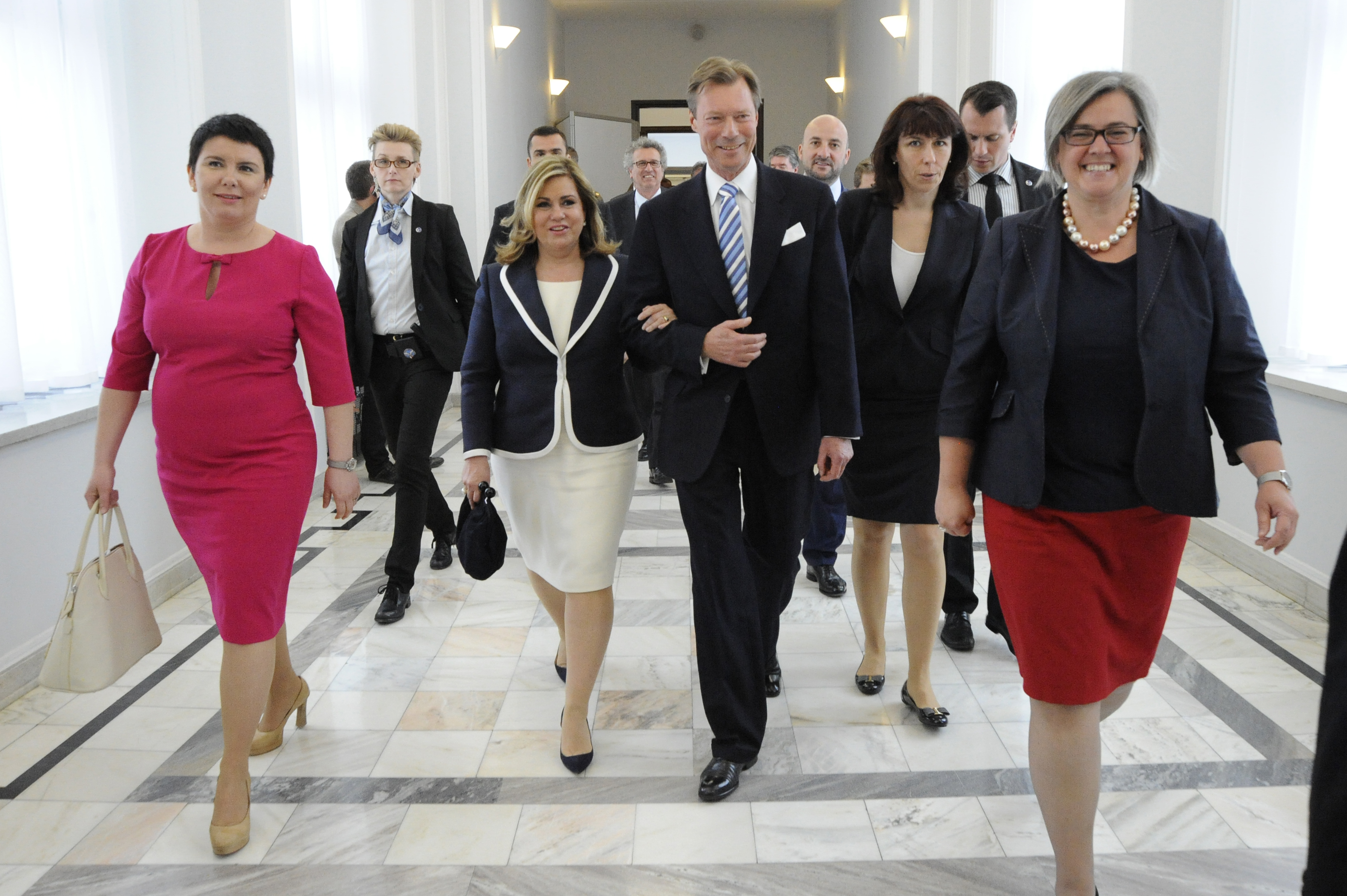
Visit of Henri, Grand Duke of Luxembourg and Maria Teresa, Grand Duchess of Luxembourg in the Senate of Poland in 2014

In 1990, a cultural and scientific cooperation treaty was signed. In 1995, a double tax avoidance agreement was signed between the two countries.

In 2015, Grand Duke Henri and Prime Minister Xavier Bettel visited the former Nazi German forced labour camp in Słońsk, and in 2016, Guillaume, Hereditary Grand Duke of Luxembourg and his wife Stéphanie visited Lubiąż.

== Economy ==
In 2014, the total trade turnover between the two countries was €490.3 million, and by 2019 it grew to €845.4 million. In 2019, the Polish-Luxembourg Chamber of Commerce was founded.

== Diplomatic missions ==
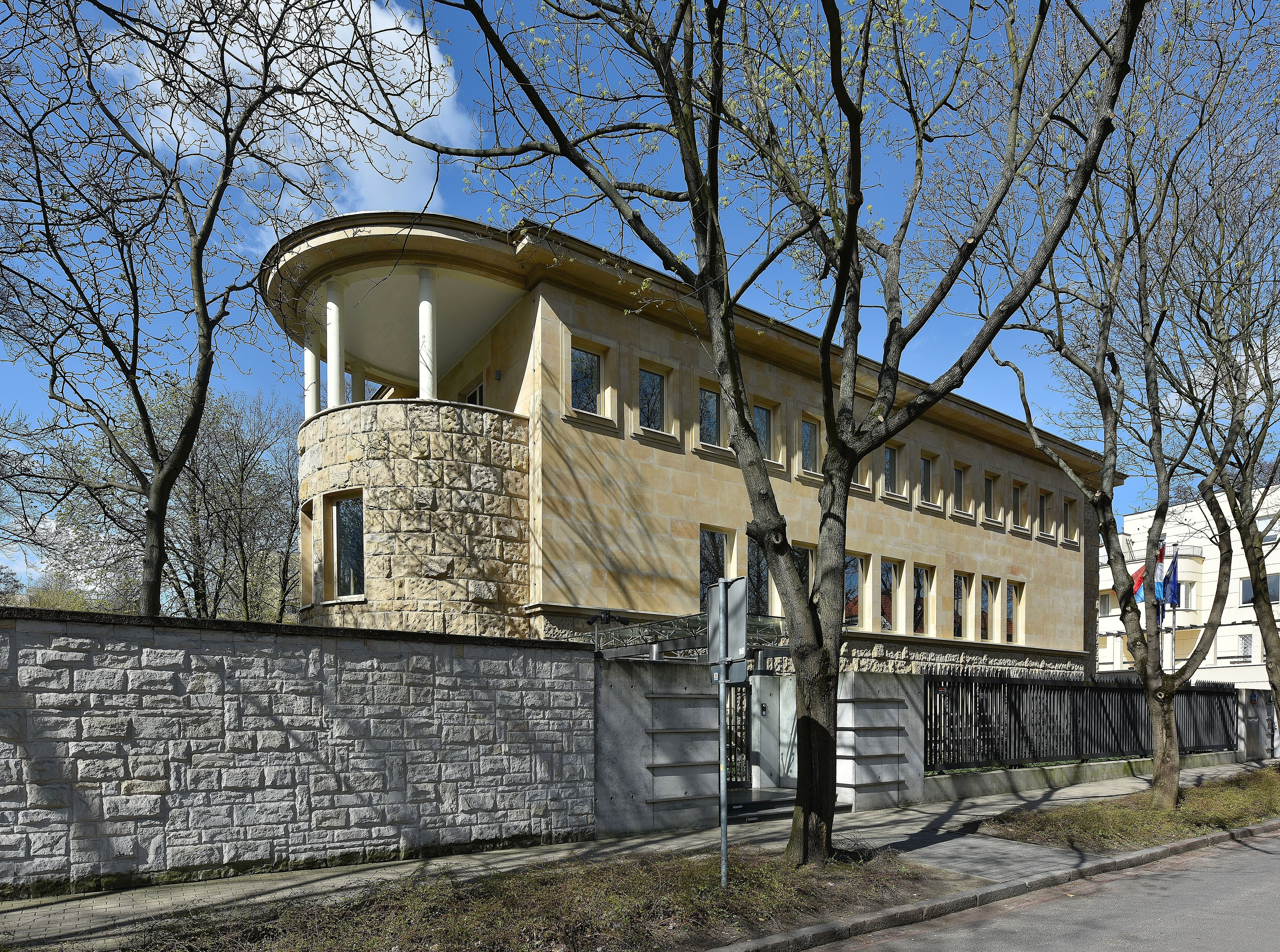
Embassy of Luxembourg in Warsaw

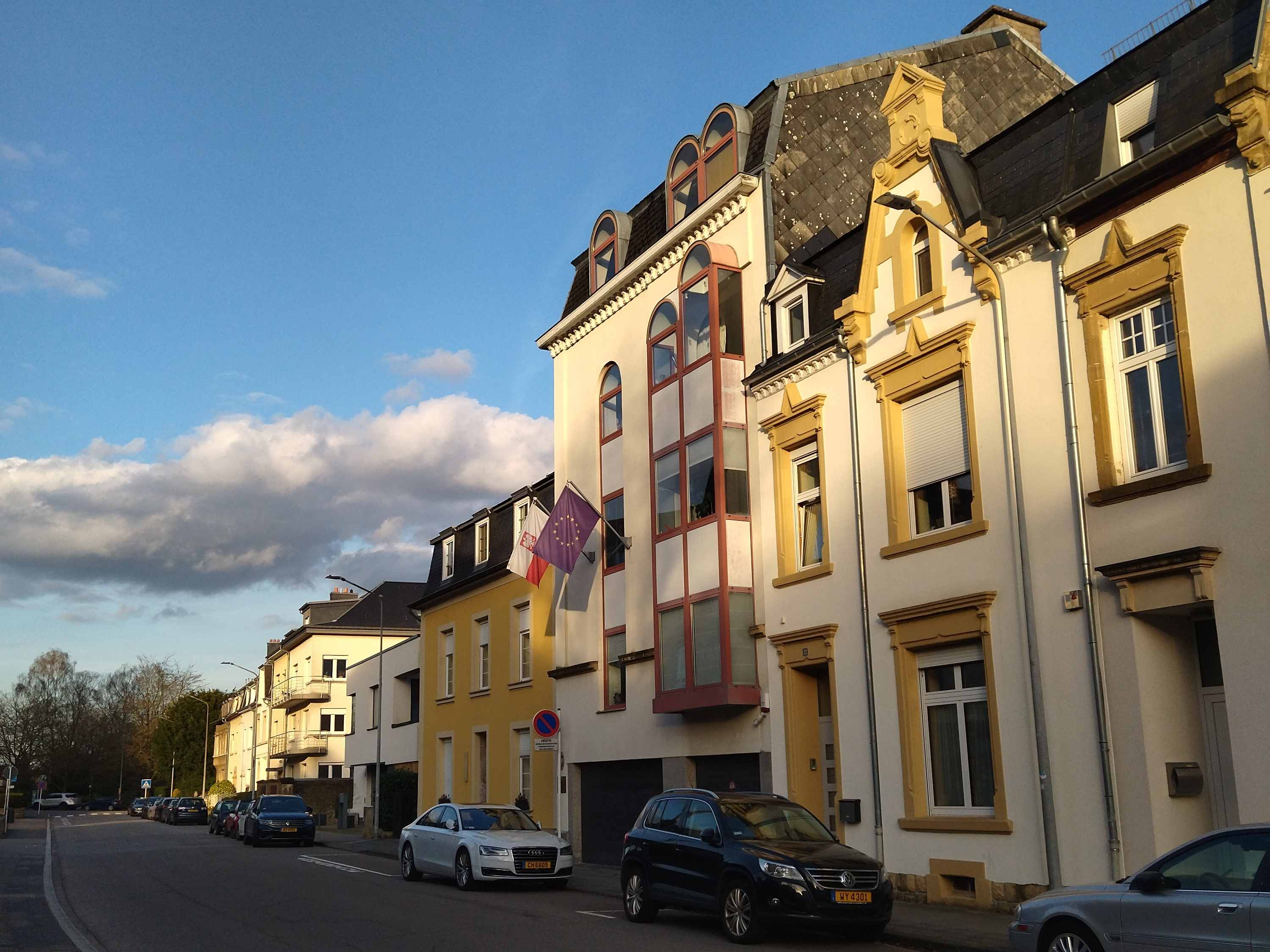
Embassy of Poland in Luxembourg City

- Luxembourg has an embassy in Warsaw .
- Poland has an embassy in Luxembourg City.

== See also ==
- Foreign relations of Luxembourg
- Foreign relations of Poland

== Bibliography ==
- 100 years of diplomatic relations between Luxembourg and Poland from A to Z/100 lat stosunków dyplomatycznych między Luksemburgiem i Polską od A do Z (in English and Polish). Embassy of the Grand Duchy of Luxembourg in Warsaw. 2021. ISBN 978-99959-0-628-3.
- Banaś, Konrad (2018). "Repatriacja Polaków z Luksemburga po II wojnie światowej". Studia Migracyjne – Przegląd Polonijny (in Polish). XLIV (1). Uniwersytet Jagielloński. ISSN 2081-4488.
