= Aleksander of Malonne =

Walloon bishop

- Bishop of Płock
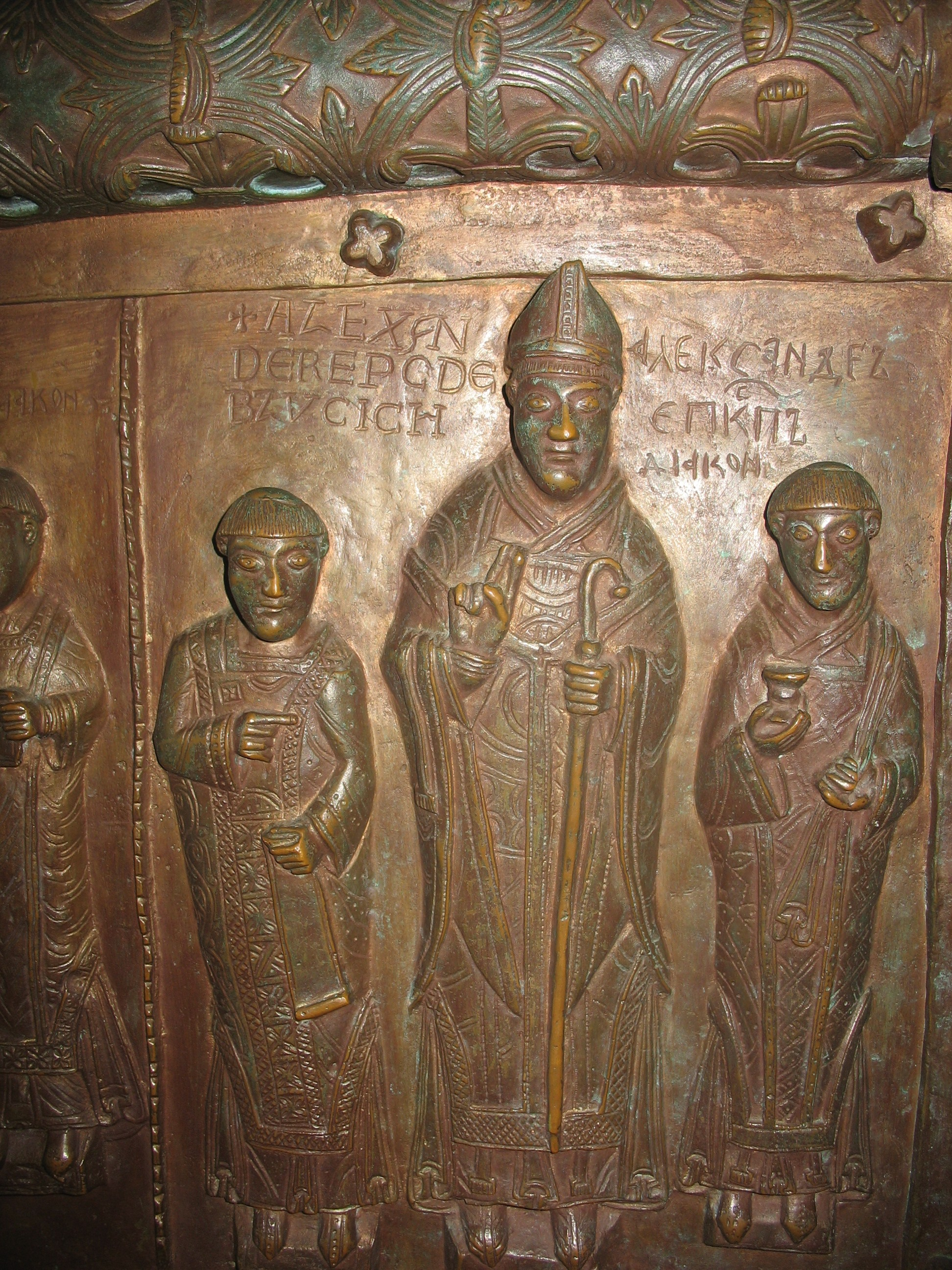
- Archbishop of Płock, Aleksander (in the middle) with his priests. Fragment of copy of the gates of Płock Cathedral
- Native name: Aleksander z Malonne
- Church: Catholic Church
- Diocese: Diocese of Płock
- In office: 1129 – 1156
- Predecessor: Szymon
- Successor: Werner

Orders
- Consecration: 1129 by Jakub of Żnin

Personal details
- Died: 1156 Płock, Duchy of Masovia, Kingdom of Poland

Aleksander of Malonne or Alexander of Malonne was a twelfth-century Walloon bishop of Płock, Poland.

He was bishop from 1129 to 1156 AD and was responsible for the construction of the current Cathedral of Płock in 1144.[2] Aleksander is depicted in a figurative bas-relief on the original cathedral doors now in Velikiy Novgorod. Depiction here is a copy currently hanging in Płock.

Religious titles
Preceded by Szymon h. Gozdawa	Bishop of Płock; 1129-1156	Succeeded by Werner Roch
