= Sowiński =

Rawicz coat of arms used by some of Sowiński family

Sowiński (feminine: Sowińska; plural: Sowińscy, Sowinskis) is a Polish surname. Meaning people who came from the towns of Sowin, Sowina, or Sowiniec. Some of them use: Prawdzic, Rawicz or Ślepowron coat of arms. It may be transliterated as: Sowinski, Sowinsky, Sovinsky, Sovinski, Совинский, Совінський. Notable people with this surname include the following:

- Adolf Sowiński (1914–1963), Polish poet, prose writer, critic, translator
- Alexander Sowinski (born 1991), Canadian musician
- Anita Sowińska (born 1973), Polish economist and politician
- Arnold Sowinski (1931–2020), French footballer
- Artur Sowiński (born 1987), Polish mixed martial artist and kickboxer
- Erik Sowinski (born 1989), American middle-distance runner
- Ewa Sowińska (born 1944), Polish politician
- Frank Sowinski, American basketball player
- Ignacy Loga-Sowiński (1914–1992), Polish activist and politician
- Ignaz Sowinski (1858–1917), Galician architect
- Józef Sowiński (1777–1831), Polish general
- Judy Sowinski (1940–2011), American roller skater
- Leonard Sowiński (1831–1887), Polish poet, literary historian, translator and political activist
- Luca Sowinski (born 2004), American soccer player
- Marian Sowiński (born 1951), Polish general
- Mariusz Sowiński (born 1976), Polish serial killer
- Vasily Sowinsky (1853–1917), Russian (imperial) carcinologist
- Wojciech Sowiński (1803 or 1805–1880), Polish pianist, composer and music journalist
- Zygmunt Sowiński (1892–1945), Polish electrical engineer, industrialist, social and economic activist, member of the Sejm, Sachsenhausen and Dachau concentration camp victim

== Places ==
- General Józef Sowiński Monument, Warsaw, Poland
- Sowiński Park, Warsaw, Poland
