= Sowiński Park =

Urban park in Warsaw, Poland

General Józef Sowiński Park
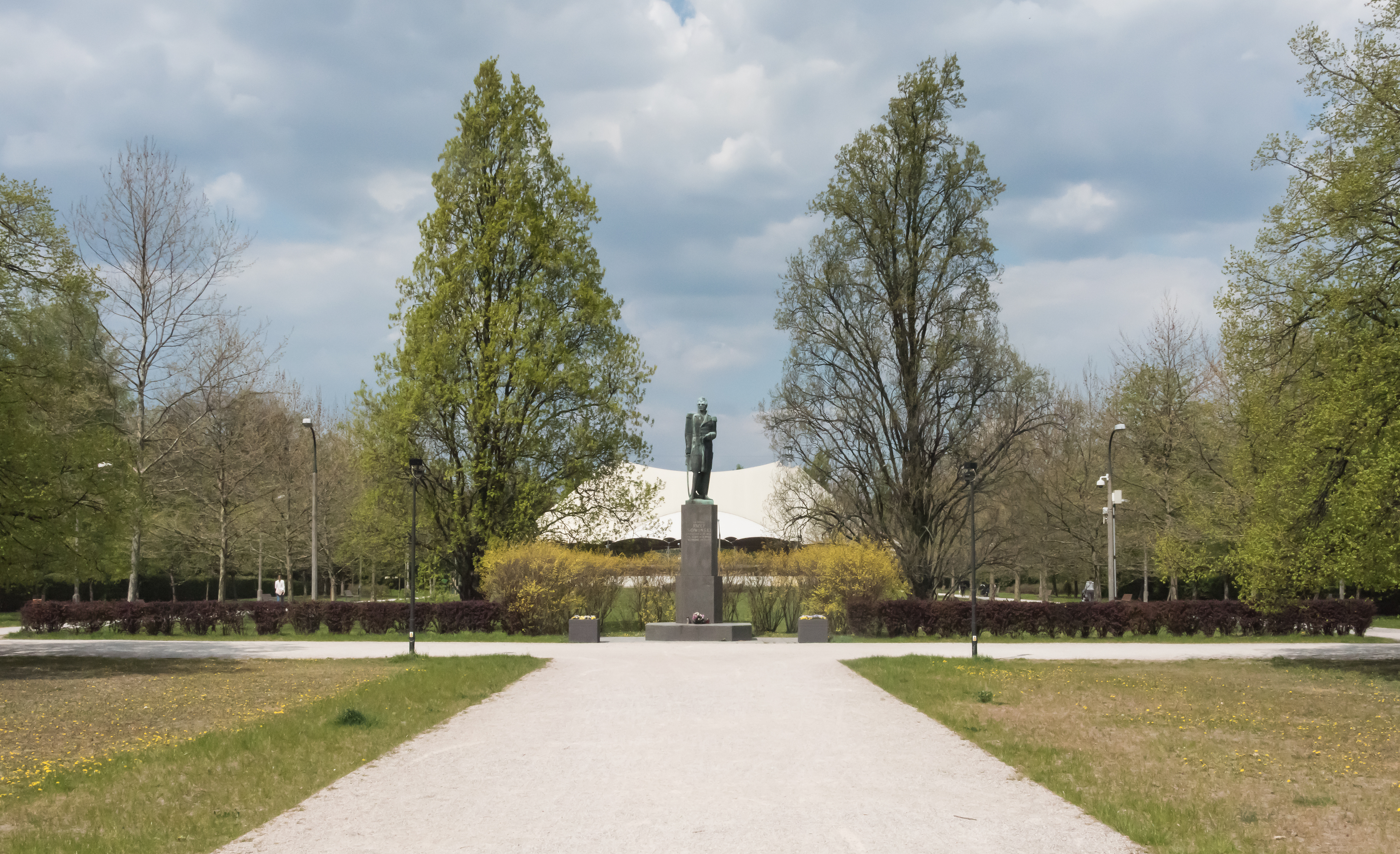
- The General Józef Sowiński Monument in the park, in 2020.
- Interactive map of General Józef Sowiński Park
- Type: Urban park
- Location: Wola, Warsaw, Poland
- Coordinates: 52°13′48″N 20°56′52″E
- Area: 8.3 hectares (21 acres)
- Created: 3 August 1936
- Designer: Zygmunt Hellwig; Kazimierz Kozłowski

The General Józef Sowiński Park, (Note: Polish: Park im. gen. Józefa Sowińskiego) also simply known as the Sowiński Park, (Note: Polish: Park Sowińskiego) is an urban park in Warsaw, Poland. It is located in the neighbourhood of Ulrychów, within the district of Wola, between Elekcyjna Street and Wolska Street. It was opened in 1936.

== History ==
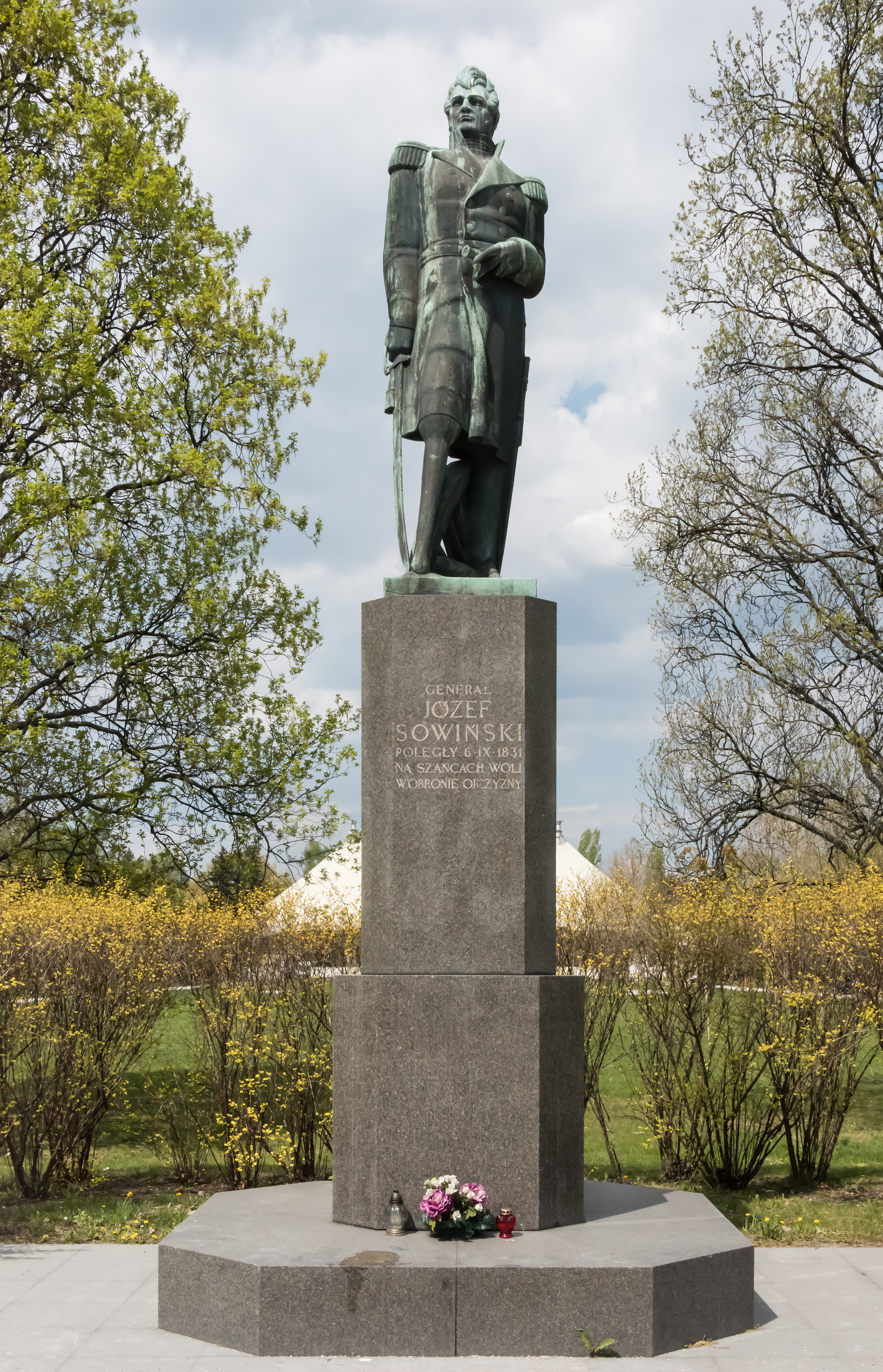
The General Józef Sowiński Monument in 2020.

The park was proposed by the Friends of Wola Society, commotioned by the mayor of Warsaw, Stefan Starzyński, and designed by Zygmunt Hellwig and Kazimierz Kozłowski. It was opened on 3 August 1936. The park was named after Józef Sowiński, a 19th-century general in the Polish insurgent military of the November Uprising. He died on 6 September 1831, in a battle against Russian forces which took place near the current location of the park.

On 28 November 1937, there was unveiled the General Józef Sowiński Monument by Tadeusz Breyer.

In 1944, during the Warsaw Uprising in the Second World War, the Wehrmacht had stationed a Karl-Gerät self-propelled siege mortar next to the monument. In August 1944, in the park 1,500 people were executed by the German forces, and bodies of 6000 victims of the Wola massacre were burned down there. In the 1950s there was erected a commemorative plaque.

After the war, the park was restored to its original form. Additionally, there was added an amphitheatre with 3,000 seats. In 2002, it was rebuilt, with a roof and 2,000 seats.

In 2019, in the park was opened a graduation tower.

== Characteristics ==
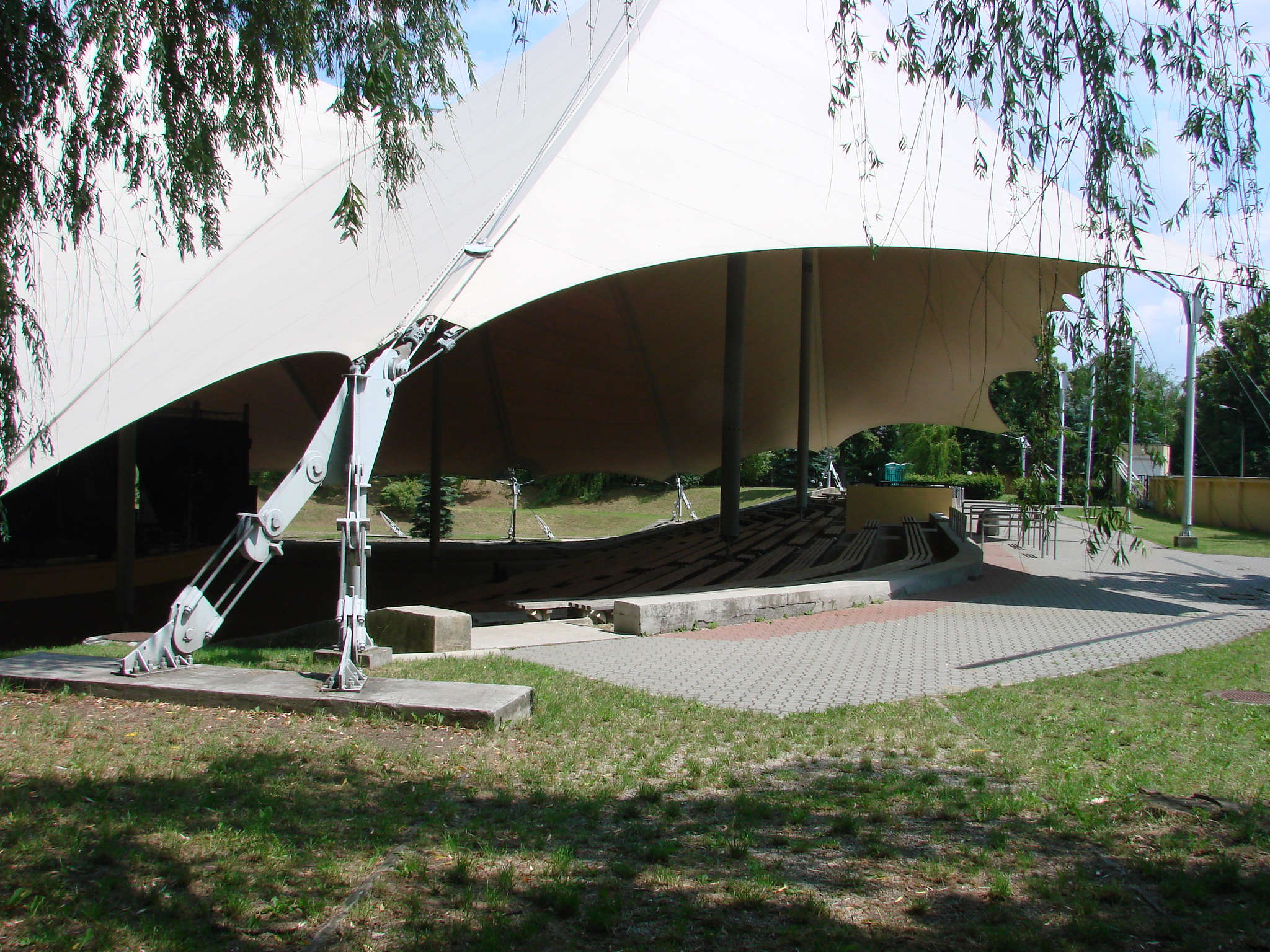
The amphitheatre in Sowiński Park in 2007.

The park is located in the neighbourhood of Ulrychów within the district of Wola, between Wolska Street, Elekcyjna Street, and Pustola Street. It borders the Orthodox Cemetery to the west, and the Edward Szymański Park to the east. It has the total area of 8.3 ha.

The park includes the General Józef Sowiński Monument by Tadeusz Breyer, an amphitheatre with 2,000 seats, and a graduation tower.
