= Statue of general Józef Sowiński =

Monument in Warsaw, Poland

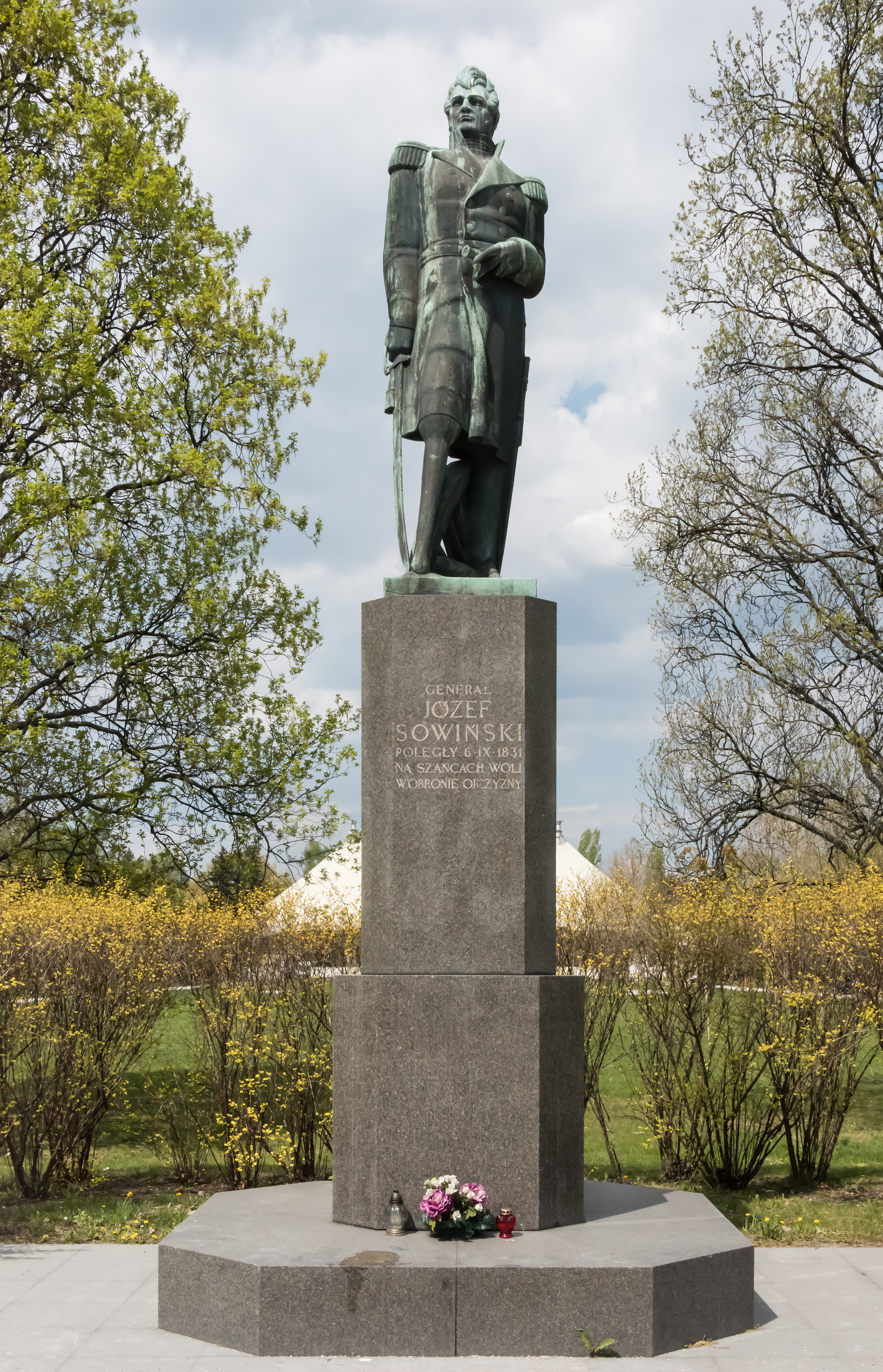
- The General Józef Sowiński Monument in 2020.
- Interactive map of Statue of general Józef Sowiński
- Location: Sowiński Park, Warsaw, Poland
- Coordinates: 52°13′46″N 20°56′54″E
- Designer: Tadeusz Breyer
- Type: Statue
- Opening date: 28 November 1937
- Dedicated to: Józef Sowiński

The statue of general Józef Sowiński (Polish: Pomnik gen. Józefa Sowińskiego) is a monument in Warsaw, Poland, located in the Sowiński Park within the district of Wola. It is dedicated to Józef Sowiński, a 19th-century officer who was a general of the Polish insurgent army during the November Uprising. It was made by Tadeusz Breyer and unveiled in 1937.

== History ==
The monument was made by sculptor Tadeusz Breyer and unveiled on 28 November 1937 in the Sowiński Park. It was dedicated Józef Sowiński, a 19th-century general in the Polish insurgent military of the November Uprising. He died on 6 September 1831, in a battle against Russian forces which took place near the current location of the park.

In 1944, during the Warsaw Uprising in the Second World War, the Wehrmacht had stationed a Karl-Gerät self-propelled siege mortar next to it. The monument has survived the war without damage.

== Characteristics ==
The monument is located in the Sowiński Park, in the neighbourhood of Ulrychów in the district of Wola. It consists of a statue of Józef Sowiński wearing a general's coat, and holding a saber in his right hand and a telescope in his left hand. Its placed on a pedestal with a following inscription:

Polish inscription

Generał Józef Sowiński
poległy 6.IX.1831
na szańcach Woli w obronie Ojczyzny.

English translation

General Józef Sowiński
killed in action on 6 September 1831
in Wola fortifications in defence of the Motherland.
