= Dobiesław Sówka =

Polish bishop

Dobiesław Sówka (of Prawdzic coat of arms) was a fourteenth-century bishop of Płock in Poland who held office from 1375 to 1381 AD.

He was son of Jan Sowiec, castellan of Dobrzyń. His brother was Stanisław Sówka.

According to older historians his family was from Gulczewo near Płock Now it is accepted that Sówka was from Szczawin.

He was made Bishop following the death of his brother Stanislaw who had been Bishop of Płock. Stanislaw, had himself succeed another their cousin, Mikołaj Sówka z Gulczewa.

Dobiesław was bishop from 5 July 1375 to 12 January 1381.

Religious titles
| Preceded by Stanisław Sówka z Gulczewa | Bishop of Płock; 1375-1381 | Succeeded by Ścibor z Radzymina |
