= Edward Szymański Park =

Urban park in Warsaw, Poland

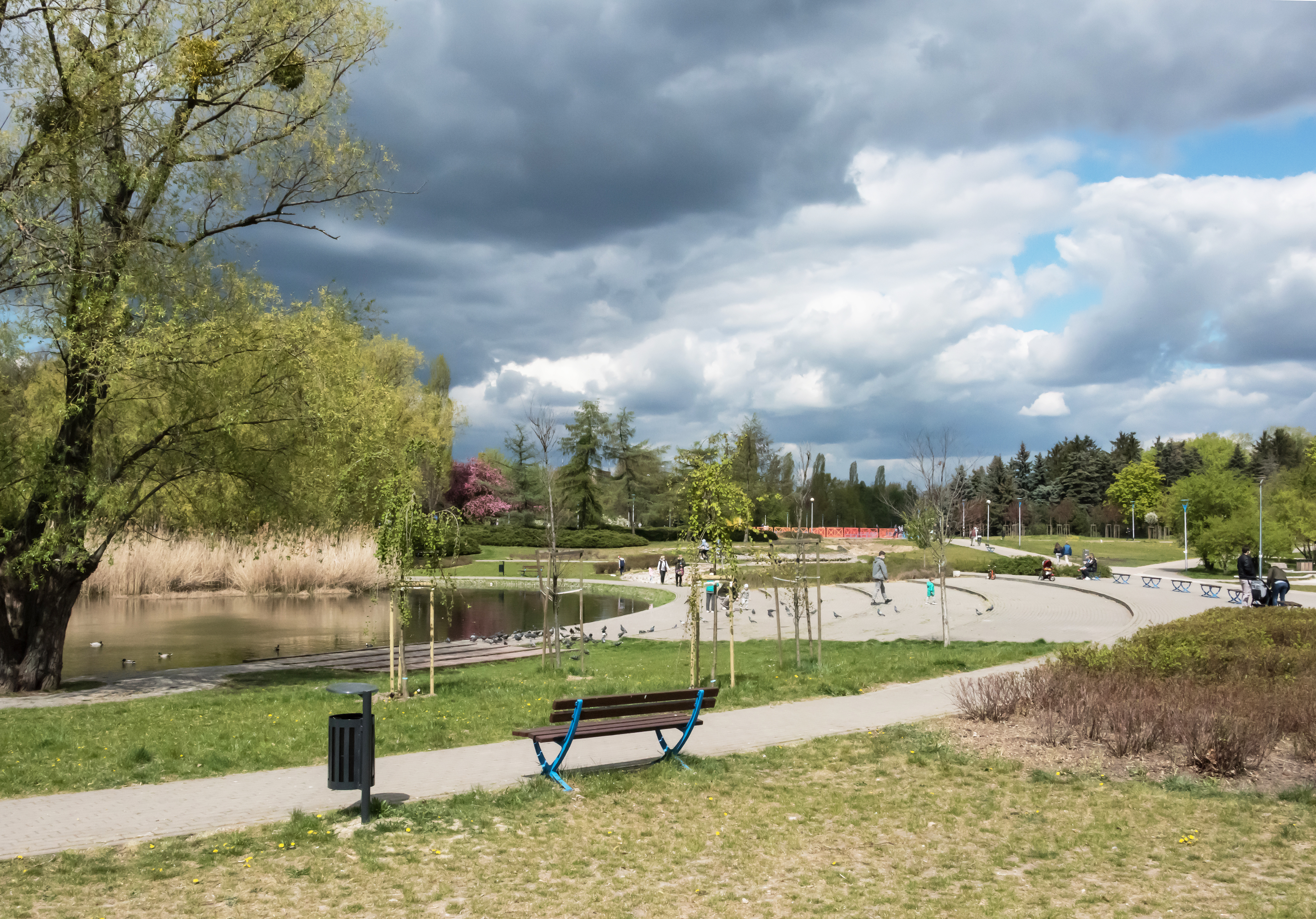
- The Edward Szymański Park in 2020.
- Interactive map of Edward Szymański Park
- Type: Urban park
- Location: Wola, Warsaw, Poland
- Coordinates: 52°14′02″N 20°57′03″E
- Area: 20.45 hectares (50.5 acres)
- Created: 1974

The Edward Szymański Park (Polish pronunciation: [ˈɛ.dvart ʂɨˈmaɲ.ski]; Polish: Park im. Edwarda Szymańskiego) is an urban park in Warsaw, Poland. It is located in the neighbourhood of Ulrychów, within the district of Wola, between Elekcyjna Street, Wolska Street, Prymas Tysiąclecia Avenue, and Górczewska Street. It was opened in 1974.

== History ==
The park was opened in 1974. It was named after Edward Szymański (1907–1943), a 20th-century poet and socialist activist.

== Characteristics ==
The park is located in the neighbourhood of Ulrychów within the district of Wola, between Elekcyjna Street, Wolska Street, Prymas Tysiąclecia Avenue, and Górczewska Street. It borders the Sowiński Park to the west, and the Moczydło Park to the north. It has the total area of 20.45 ha.

The park includes a monument of Edward Szymański, the Oczko pond, and water cascades.

== Gallery ==
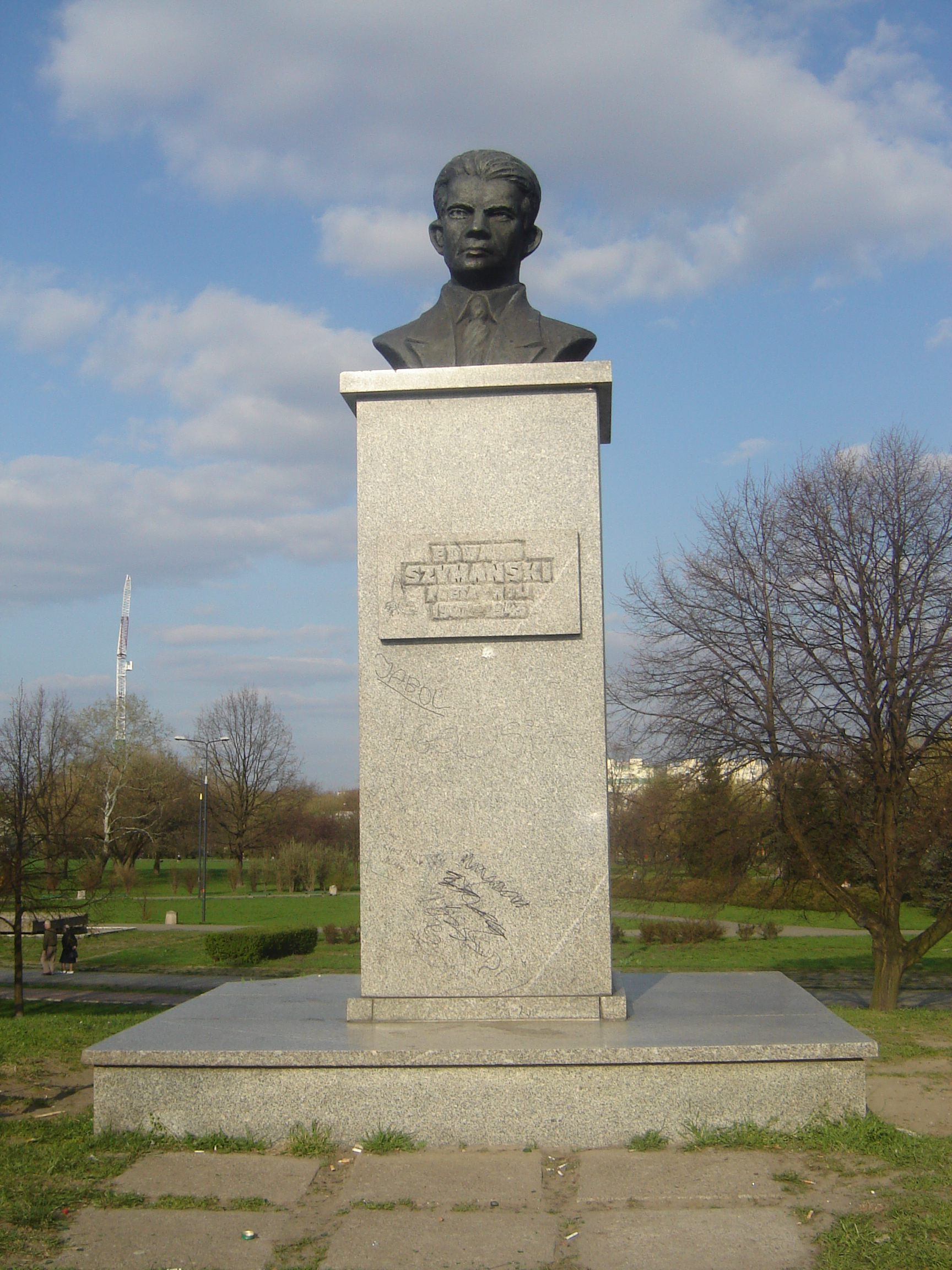
Monument of Edward Szymański

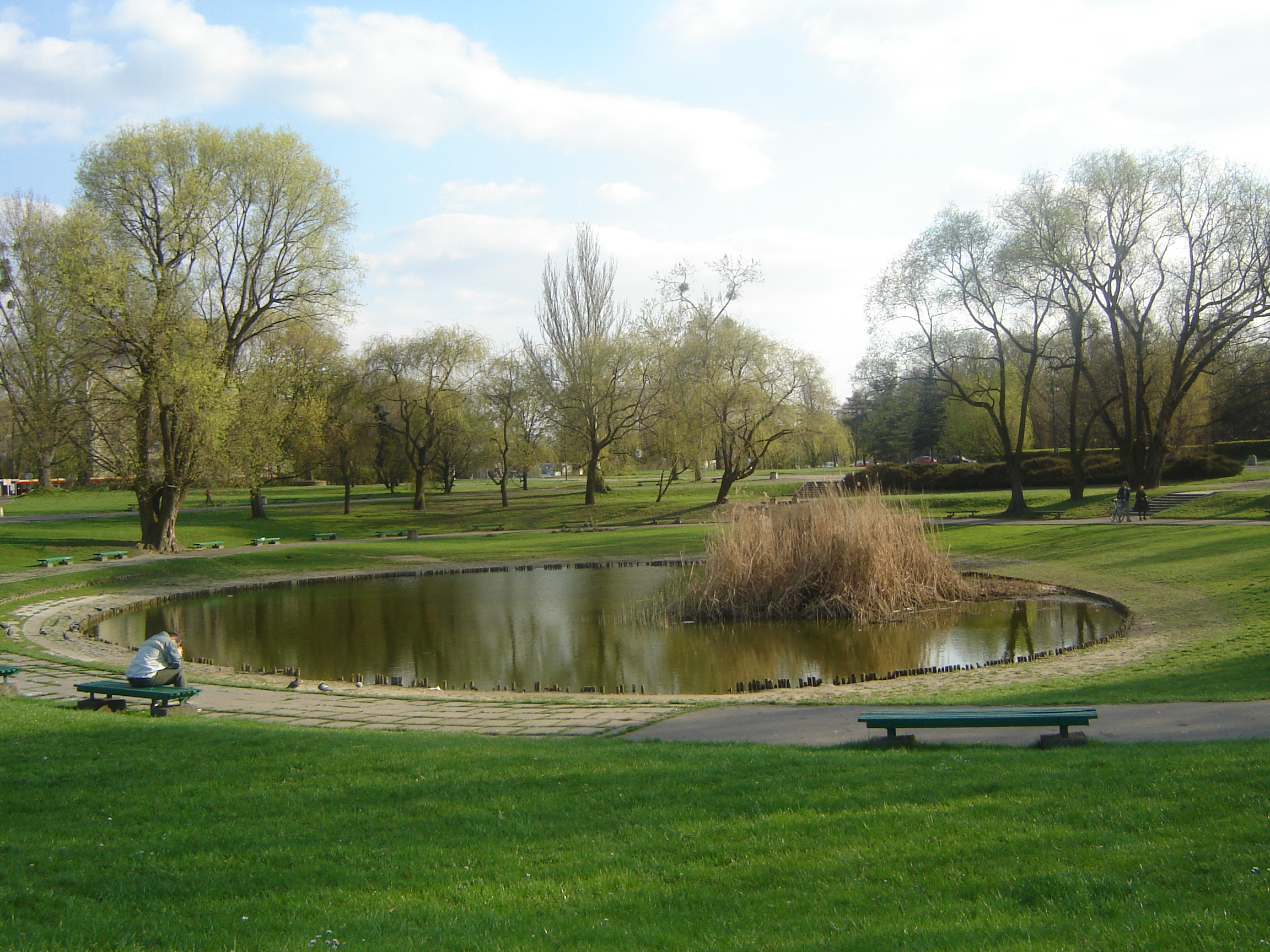
The Oczko Pond

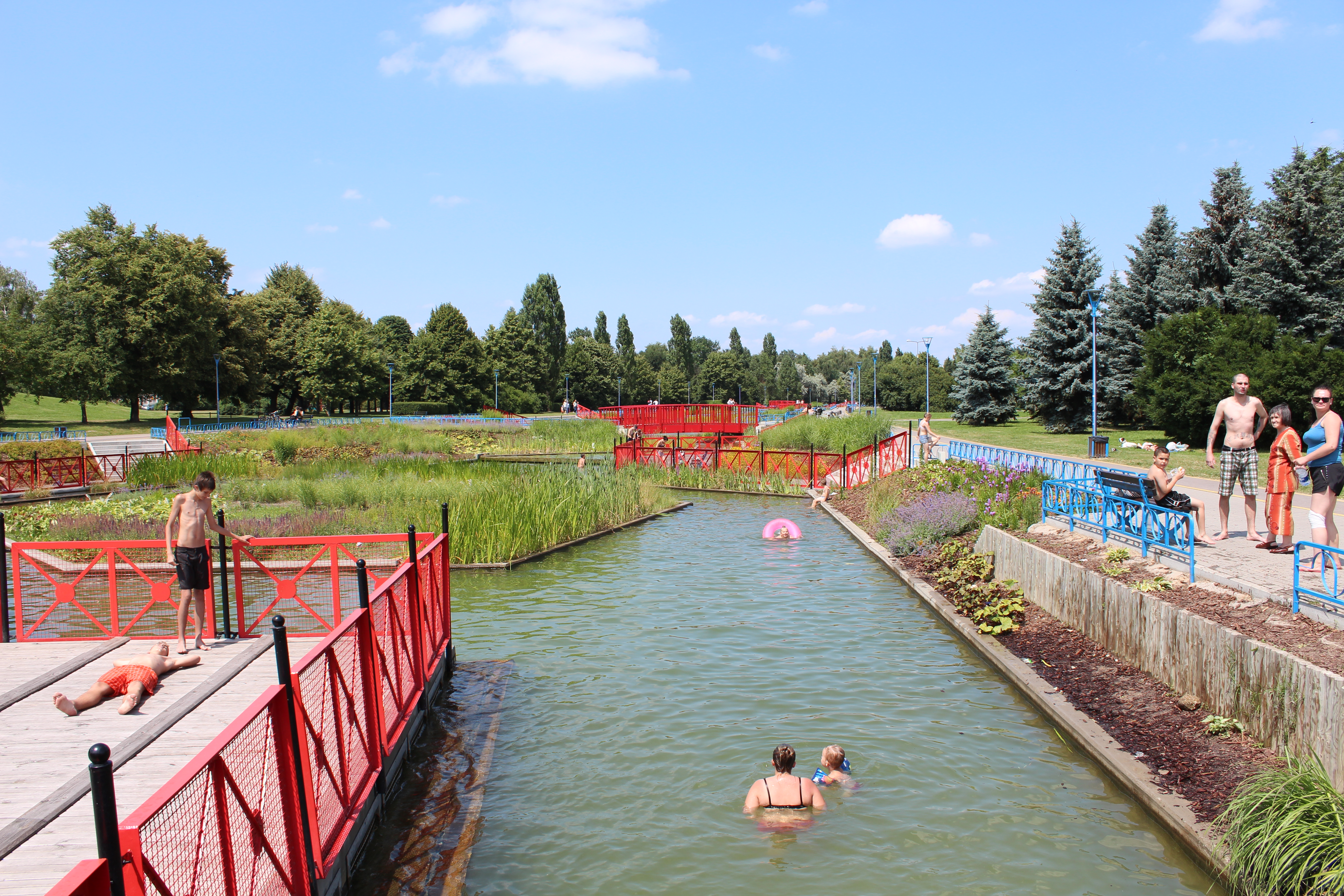
Water cascades
