= Stanisław Sówka =

Polish bishop

Stanisław Sówka (of Prawdzic coat of arms), was a fourteenth-century bishop of Płock in Poland who held office from 1367 to 1375 AD.

According to older publications he came from Gulczewa near Płock and with his brother Mikołaj worked in the office of the king. Mikołaj was appointed a bishop by pope Urban V a position he filled for 12 years. Following his death Stanislaw was appointed to replace his brother. Stanislaw was in turn succeeded by another brother, Dobiesław Sówka who was bishop from 5 July 1375 to the 12th of January 1381.

Religious titles
Preceded by Mikołaj Sówka z Gulczewa	Bishop of Płock; 1367-1375	Succeeded by Dobiesław Sówka
