= Płocka metro station =

Warsaw metro station

Płocka
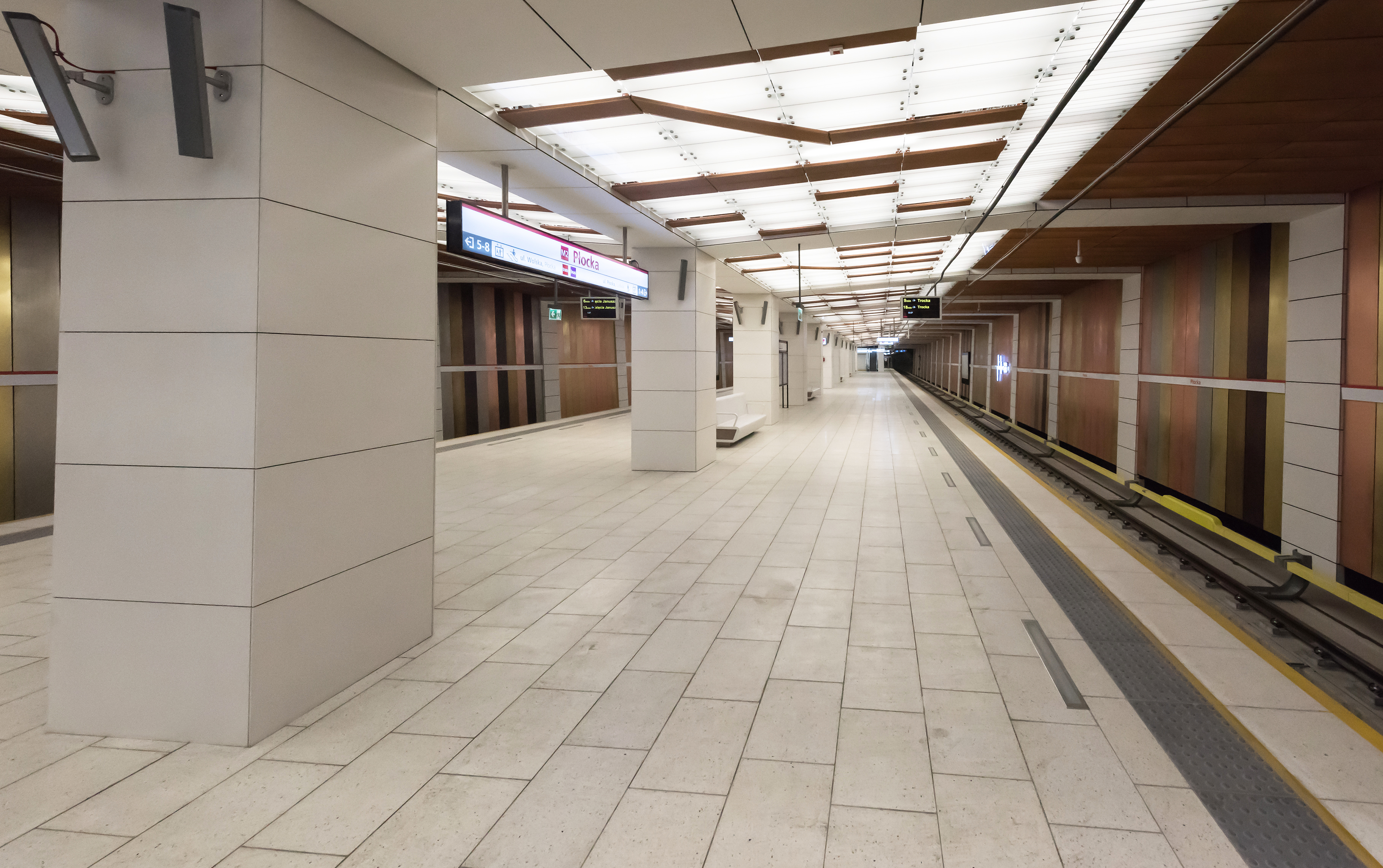

General information
- Coordinates: 52.2316396°N 20.9670387°E
- Owner: ZTM Warszawa
- Operator: ZTM Warszawa
- Platforms: 1 island platform
- Tracks: 2
- Connections: 103, 136; N45, N95; 13, 26, 27

Construction
- Platform levels: 1
- Accessible: Yes

Other information
- Station code: C-8
- Fare zone: 1

History
- Opened: 4 April 2020; 6 years ago
- Former names: Wolska (During planning phase)

Services
Preceding station	Warsaw Metro	Following station
Młynów towards Bemowo	M2 line	Rondo Daszyńskiego towards Bródno
Location
- Location within Warsaw

Płocka is a M2 metro line Warsaw Metro station in Wola district, by the intersection of Płocka and Wolska streets.

The station is 163.6 m in length, and the cubic capacity at 59 198 m³. The bronze and copper colour scheme of the station refers to the industrial history of Wola.
