= Mikołaj Sówka z Gulczewa =

Polish bishop

Mikołaj Sówka z Gulczewa (of Prawdzic coat of arms), also known as Nicholas, was fourteenth century bishop of Płock in Poland who held office from 10 December 1365 to 1367AD.

He came from Gulczewa near Płock, was a canon of Płock Cathedral during the reign of Bishop Florian Kościelec. and with his brother Stanislaus, worked in the office of the king. He received regal support and on 7 August 1365, was selected by the cathedral chapter as head of the diocese. To secure succession Mikołaj went to Avignon and was appointed a bishop by pope Urban V and consecrated on 13 December 1365 by Cardinal Elijah, Bishop of Ostia.

While in Avignon he spent some time fixing the diocese tax debt, which had been compounded to 10,000 florins due mainly to a five-year vacancy in the bishops role. A promised payment of two instalments, in Easter 1366 and 1367 was made.

After returning home, he took part in a provincial synod in Kalisz . According to Jan Długosz, Mikołaj died in September 1367 and was buried in the Cathedral Basilica of the Assumption in Płock. His brother Stanislaw of Gulczewa succeeded him as Bishop of Płock from 1367 to 1375 and Stanislaw was in turn succeeded by another brother, Dobiesław Sówka Z Gulczewa who was bishop from 5 July 1375 to 12 January 1381.

Religious titles
Preceded by Janisław Wroński	Bishop of Płock; 1365–1367	Succeeded by Stanisław Sówka
