= Czyste =

Neighborhood of the Wola district in Warsaw, Poland

Coordinates: 52°13′53″N 20°58′20″E

Location of Czyste in Wola

Czysta is one of the neighborhoods of the Wola district of Warsaw, Poland. It is limited by Wolska and Towarowa streets from the north and east and by railway lines from the west and south.

Originally Czyste was a village located right outside the Lubomirski Ramparts, that is the outer city defences of Warsaw, between Jerozolimskie Gate and Wola Gate. In 1827 it had 16 houses and 223 inhabitants and was a seat of a gmina. During the Battle of Warsaw of 1831 the village was the focal point of Polish defence of the city. By the end of 19th century rapid expansion of the city of Warsaw led to the village of Czyste virtually merging with the nearby villages of Wielka Wola, Koło and Ochota. The four combined villages had 512 houses and 8000 inhabitants.

The new suburb was variously referred to by names of former villages. It was mostly industrial, with many manufactures and factories located there, in addition to over 90 windmills supplying the bakeries of Warsaw. In 1916 Czyste ceased to exist as a separate administrative entity and was attached to Warsaw along with Wola and Ochota. Currently the name is used by the Municipal Information System for a small neighborhood within the borough of Wola, while the remaining grounds of the former village are attached to other areas under different names.
