= Royal secretary =

Official at the court of a monarch

Royal Secretary is a position at the court of a monarch generally responsible for communicating the sovereign's wishes to the other members of government. At times and places it may have a number of other duties. In most cases the royal secretary is a close adviser of the monarch. In some cases the office of Royal Secretary evolved into the Secretary of State.

== Biblical ==
In the Kingdom of Israel the royal secretary had both the duties of private secretary to the king and secretary of state. In addition, the royal secretary exercised some fiscal duties.

== Great Britain ==
Currently the royal secretary of Great Britain is denominated Private Secretary to the Sovereign and has been since 1805.

=== England ===
- Thomas Cromwell was royal secretary to Henry VIII from 1534 to 1540.

=== Scotland ===
- Thomas Erskine was royal secretary to James V of Scotland from 1524 to 1525
- Patrick Hepburn was royal secretary to James V of Scotland from March 1525 to June 1526
- David Ricco (David Rizzio) was royal secretary to Mary Stuart, Queen of Scots. Ricco helped to arrange her marriage to Henry Stuart, Lord Darnley.

== Hungary ==
- János Aczél was royal secretary to Louis II of Hungary circa 1520

== Korea ==
Seungjeongwon was the Royal Secretariat during the Joseon Dynasty of Korea (1392 – 1910).

== Poland ==
Originally of the office of royal secretary in Poland was the secretary protonotarius (or royal notary). It was under this name that the office operated under Władysław II Jagiełło from 1387 to 1423. Under the Jagiellon dynasty the royal secretaries were responsible for arranging the royal correspondence, representing the king at the regional sejms, arranging all kinds of cases most often financial, diplomatic correspondence, and editing the most important public documents. They also kept deputations entertained and resolved disputes between courtiers. The elected kings maintained the tradition and the royal secretary often had a great deal of power.

- Zbigniew Oleśnicki was royal secretary to Władysław II Jagiełło 1401–1434
- Piotr Gamrat was royal secretary to Sigismund I the Old
- Marcin Kromer was royal secretary to Sigismund I the Old and to Sigismund II Augustus
- Stanislaw Bojanowski was royal secretary to Sigismund II Augustus 1543-
- Jan Borukowski was royal secretary to Sigismund II Augustus 1553–1566
- Jan Zamoyski was royal secretary to Sigismund II Augustus 1566–1572
- Maciej Konopacki was royal secretary to Sigismund III Vasa from 1587 to 1590
- Stanisław Łubieński was royal secretary to Sigismund III Vasa from 1591 to 1613
- Paweł Piasecki was royal secretary to Sigismund III Vasa 1613–1627
- Jan Andrzej Morsztyn was royal secretary to Jan II Kazimierz 1656–1668
- Ignacy Kluczewski was royal secretary to Stanisław II August
- Tadeusz Thullie was the last royal secretary to Stanisław II August

== Vatican ==
The secretary to the Pope, formerly known as Secretarius Domesticus evolved into the Secretariat of State.
