= Schnabel car =

Specialized railroad freight car

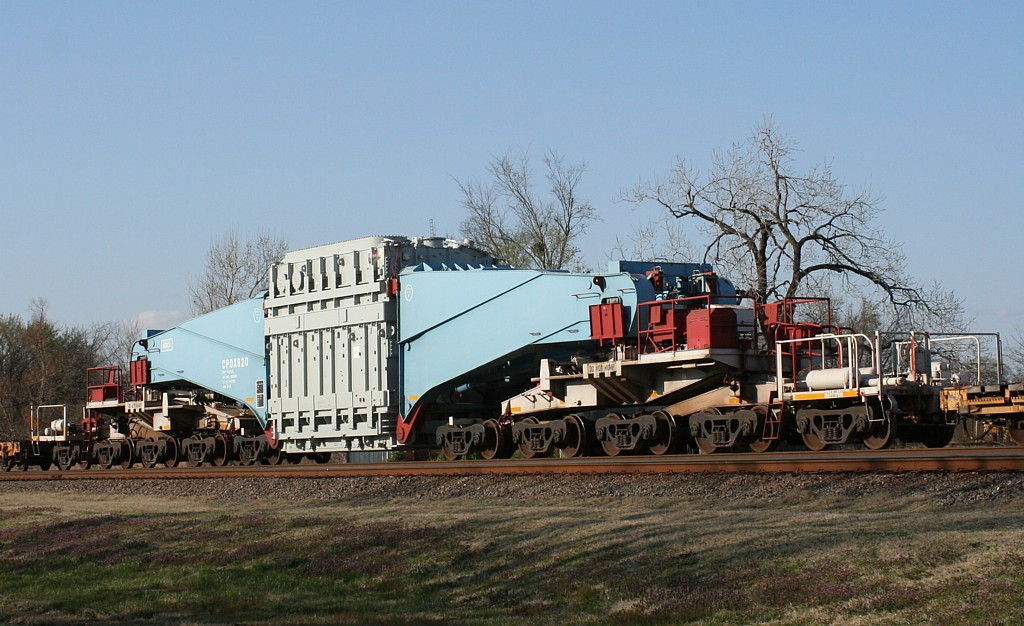
Consumers Power Company Schnabel car with an electrical transformer in Texas in 2008

A Schnabel car or Schnabel wagon is a specialized type of railroad freight car. It is designed to carry heavy and oversized loads in such a way that the load makes up part of the car. The load is suspended between the two ends of the cars by lifting arms; the lifting arms are connected to an assembly of span bolsters that distribute the weight of the load and the lifting arm over many wheels.

When a Schnabel car is empty, the two lifting arms are connected to one another and the car can usually operate at normal freight train speeds. Some Schnabel cars include hydraulic equipment that will either lift or horizontally shift the load while in transit (at very low speeds) to clear obstructions along the car's route. As of 2012, there were 31 Schnabel cars operating in Europe, 30 in North America, 25 in Asia, and one in Australia.

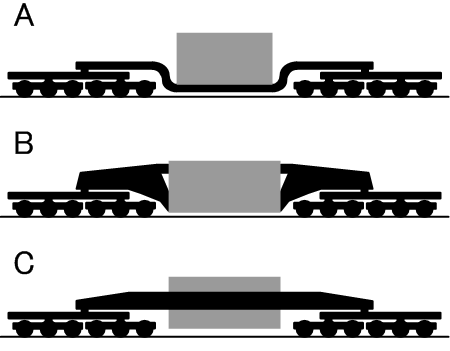
Types of heavy capacity railroad cars: A: Depressed-center flatcar B: Schnabel car (self-supporting load) C: Well hole car. In this figure, black indicates parts of the car and gray is the cargo.

== Examples ==
The largest Schnabel car in public railroad operation, reporting number WECX 801, was completed in 2012 by Kasgro Railcar for Westinghouse Nuclear and is used in North America primarily to transport reactor pressure vessels. It has 36 axles (18 for each half). Each half contains nine trucks which are connected by a complex system of span bolsters. Its tare (unloaded) weight is 399.6 short tons (362.5 t; 356.8 long tons) and has a load limit of 1,017.9 short tons (923.4 t; 908.8 long tons) for a maximum gross weight of 1,417.5 short tons (1,285.9 t; 1,265.6 long tons). WECX 801 has the ability to shift its load 44 inches (1.12 m) vertically and up to 40 inches (1.02 m) laterally on either side of the car's centerline. When empty, this car measures 231 ft (70 m) long; for comparison, a conventional boxcar currently operating on North American railroads has a single two-axle truck at each end of the car, measures 50 to 89 feet (15–27 m) long and has a capacity of 70 to 105 short tons (64–95 t; 63–94 long tons). The train's speed is limited to 25 mph (40 km/h) when WECX 801 is empty, but only 15 mph (24 km/h) when loaded, and the system requires a crew of six operators in addition to the train's crew.

The second largest Schnabel car in service, owned by ABB, bears the CEBX 800 registration, and is used in North America. Built by Krupp AG, it has 36 axles (18 for each half). Each half has 9 bogies linked together by a complex system of span bolsters. Its tare weight (empty mass) is 370 tonnes (360 long tons; 410 short tons). When empty, this wagon is 70.6 m (232 ft) long. It can carry a load of 34.5 m (113 ft) long and 852.3 tonnes (838.8 long tons; 939.5 short tons).

== History ==
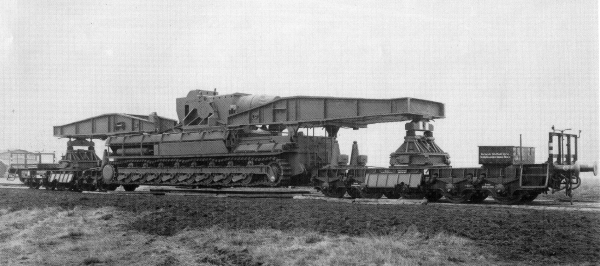
A Karl-Gerät self-propelled siege mortar with its pair of Schnabel-cars on rails

The word Schnabel is from German Tragschnabelwagen, meaning "carrying-beak-wagon", because of the usually tapered shape of the lifting arms, resembling a bird's beak.

In World War II, the German Wehrmacht used Schnabel cars for transporting the Karl-Gerät heavy-calibre (54 cm and 60 cm calibre) siege mortars. These were self-propelled with a continuous-track suspension chassis of substantial length to maneuver into a firing position over a short range, but depended on a pair of purpose-designed Schnabel cars for long-range transport by rail. The same system was also used at the same time for the rail transport of the French FCM 2C super-heavy armoured fighting vehicle.

In the United States, the first Schnabel car, WECX 200, was built for Westinghouse Nuclear by manufacturer Greenville Steel Car in the 1960s.

A 1972 patent application granted in 1974 described a Schnabel car claimed to be simplified and easier to use.

As of 2025, there are few Schnabel cars in the world because it is a niche mode of transport and because moving huge loads at low speeds affects other railway operations. Heavy-haul and oversize transport companies prefer moving large loads on a hydraulic modular trailer, which works faster and cheaper than the railroad. Heavy loads from Schnabel cars can be shifted to a hydraulic modular trailer along with the arms and bolster, keeping the load intact.

== List of selected Schnabel wagons ==
Class number	Maximum carrying capacity	Tare weight	Wheelsets	Quantity (DB as at 31 Dec 1997)	Length over buffers	Bogie pivot spacing or wheelset spacing	Length of low loading bay
Uaai 812	159 t (156 long tons; 175 short tons)	41,000 kg (90,000 lb)	10	1	19,704 mm (64 ft 7.7 in)	8,970 mm (29 ft 5 in)	N/A
Uaai 820	157 t (155 long tons; 173 short tons)	83,100 kg (183,200 lb)	12	1	31,440 mm (103 ft 2 in)	19,100 mm (62 ft 8 in)	8,500 mm (27 ft 11 in)
Uaai 821	190 t (190 long tons; 210 short tons) (180 t (180 long tons; 200 short tons) with suspension bars)	83,800 kg (184,700 lb)	12	1	30,124 mm (98 ft 10.0 in)	19,100 mm (62 ft 8 in)	8,000 mm (26 ft 3 in)
Uaai 823	230 t (230 long tons; 250 short tons)	102.2 t (100.6 long tons; 112.7 short tons)	16	1	37,080 mm (121 ft 8 in)	N/A	N/A
Uaai 831	275 t (271 long tons; 303 short tons) (250 t (250 long tons; 280 short tons) with suspension bars)	170,000 kg (370,000 lb)	20	2	45,120 mm (148 ft 0 in)	18,730 mm (61 ft 5 in); 28,330 mm (92 ft 11 in)	N/A
Uaai 836	317 t (312 long tons; 349 short tons)	82.870 kg (182.70 lb)	20	1	31,800 mm (104 ft 4 in)	15,300 mm (50 ft 2 in)	N/A
Uaai 837	398 t (392 long tons; 439 short tons)	N/A	24	1	N/A	N/A	N/A
Uaai 838	341 t (336 long tons; 376 short tons) (313 t (308 long tons; 345 short tons) with suspension bars)	N/A	24	1	N/A	N/A	N/A
Uaai 839	454 t (447 long tons; 500 short tons)	N/A	32	1	N/A	N/A	N/A

== Gallery ==
Examples of Schnabel cars

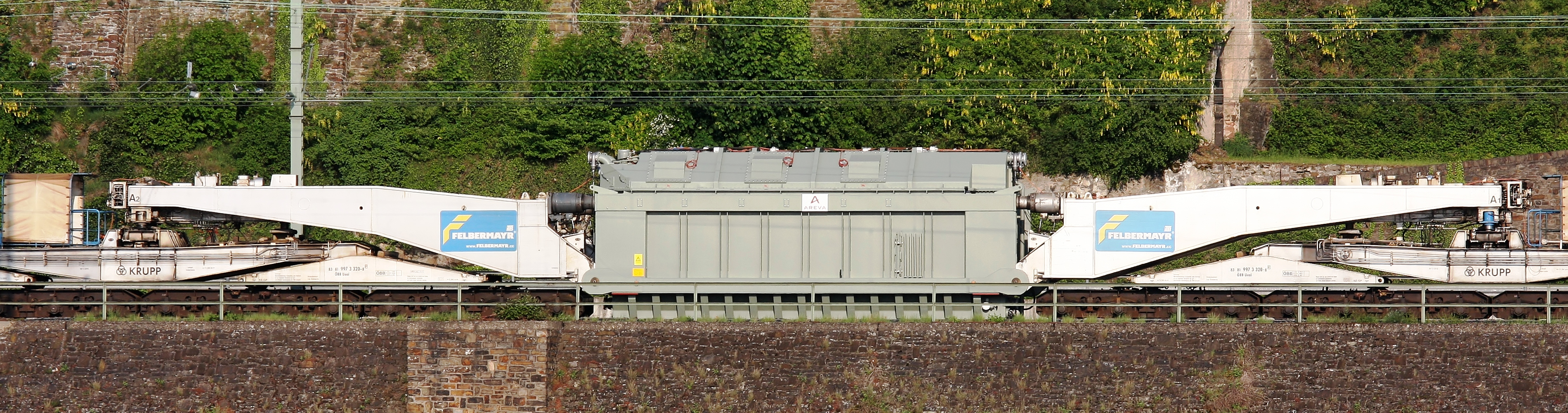
ÖBB Schnabel car with an electrical transformer near Koblenz in May 2009

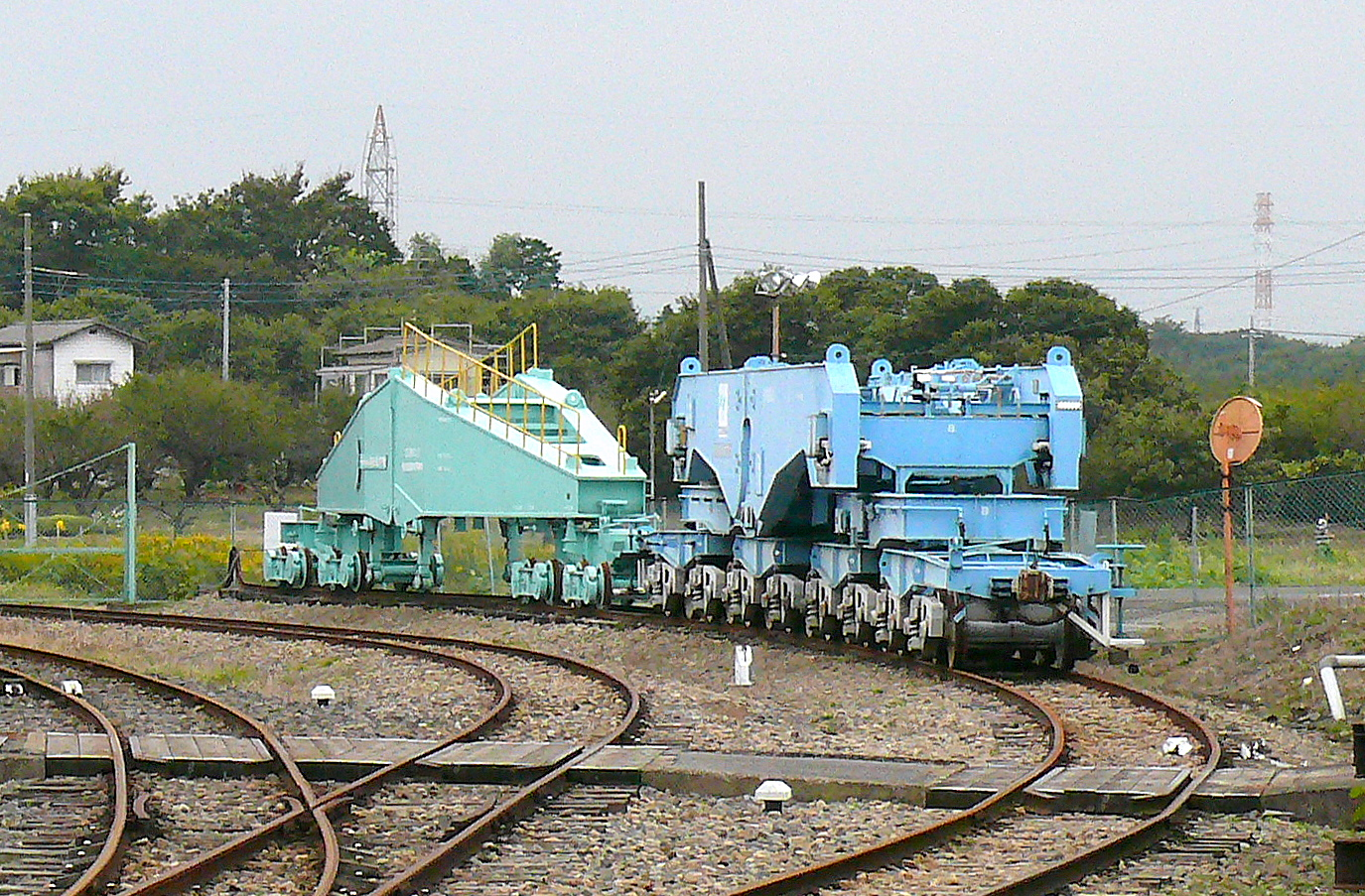
Two Schnabel cars without loads in Japan

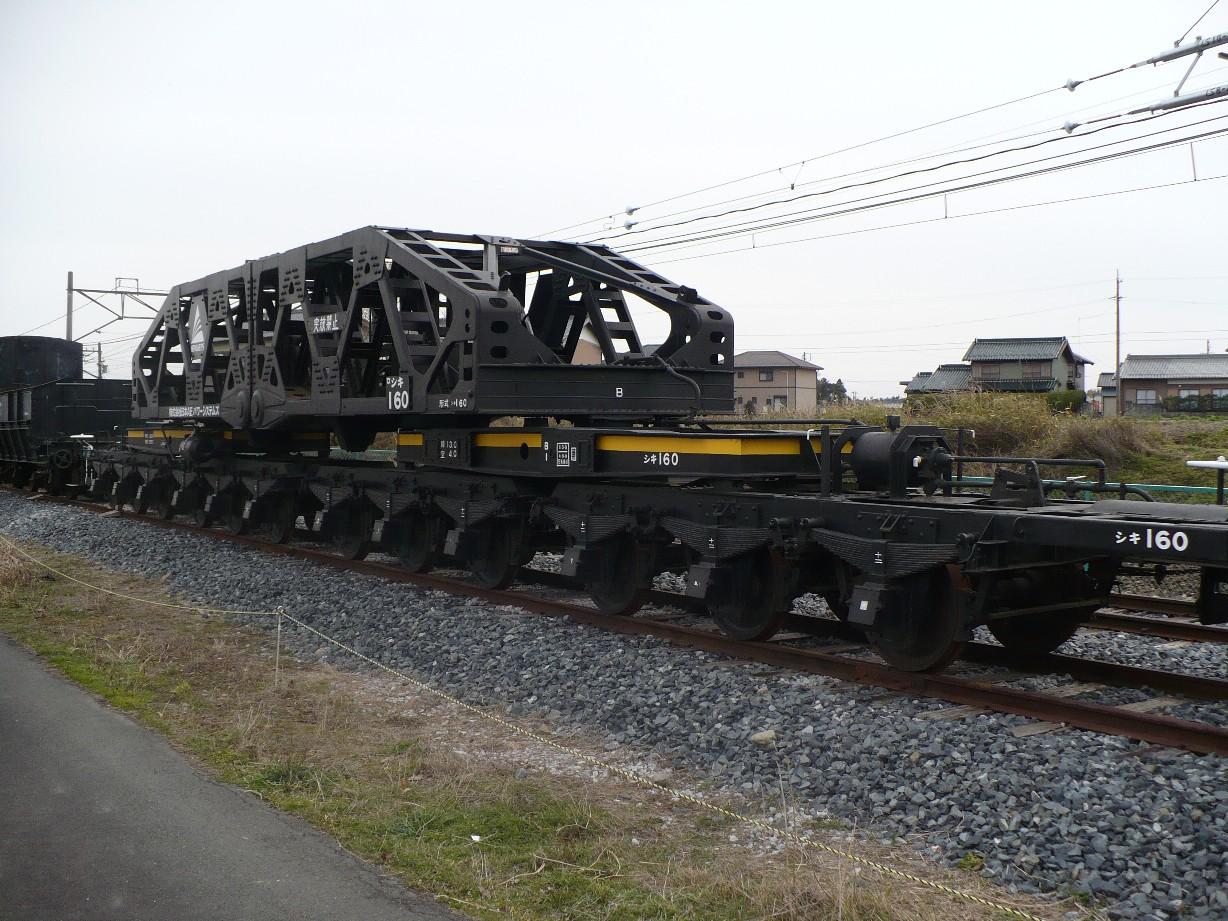
Empty Japanese wagon

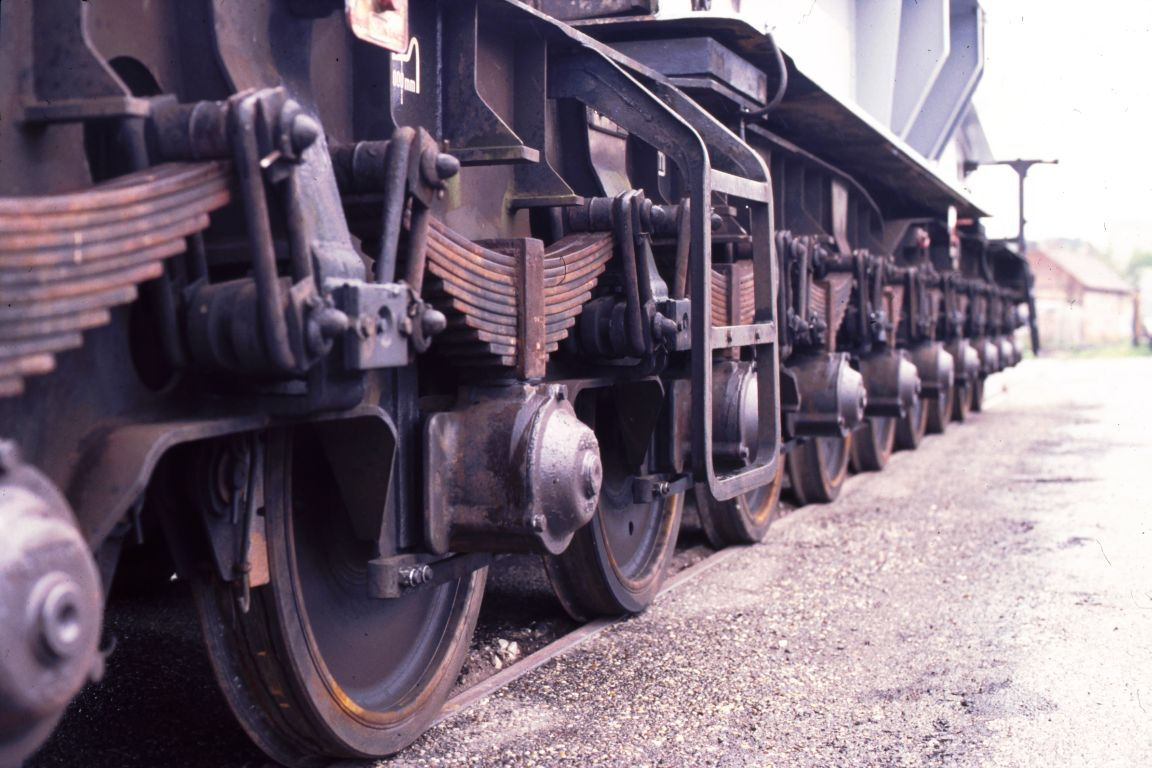
Many wheels of a German schnabel wagon

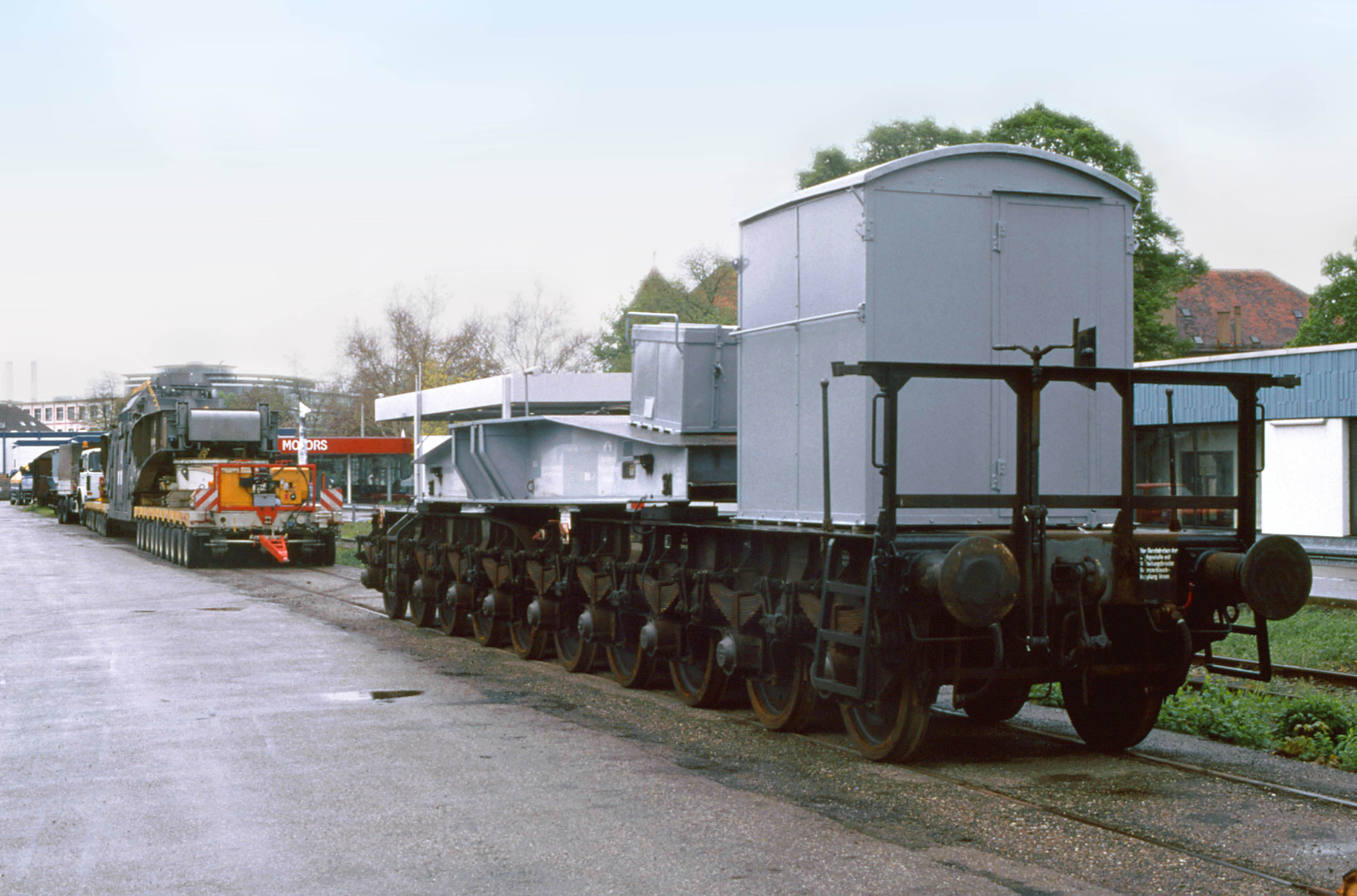
Arrival of a Schnabel wagon at its destination with a large transformer. The load will now be transported by road on a lowboy.

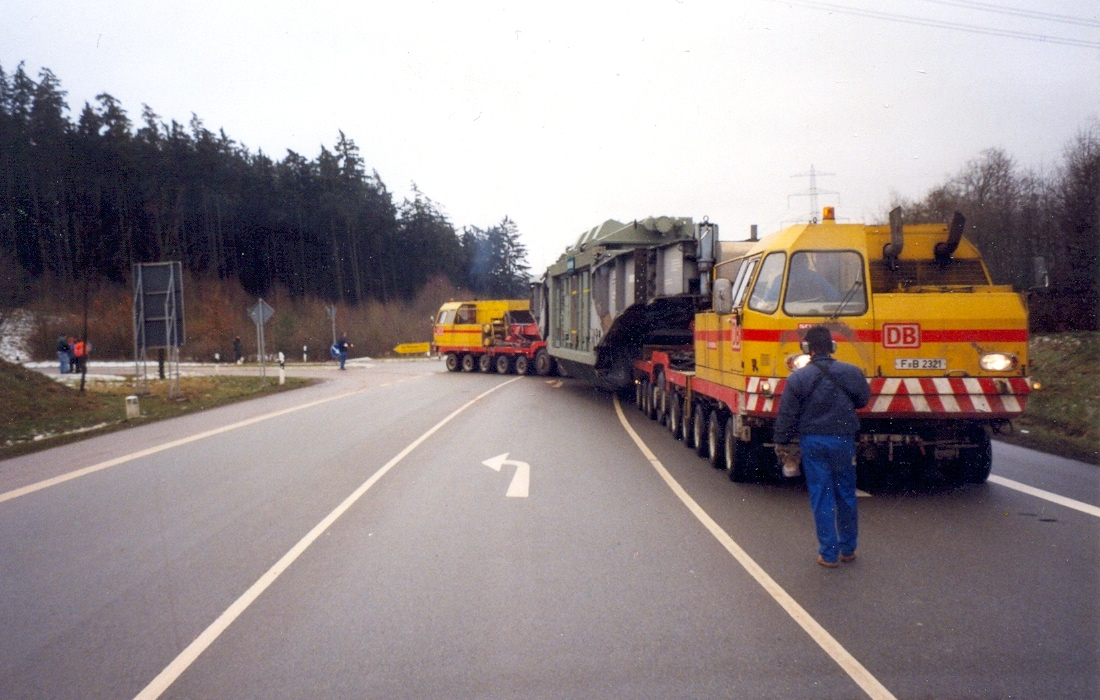
Onward transportation of the large transformer by road to the electricity substation

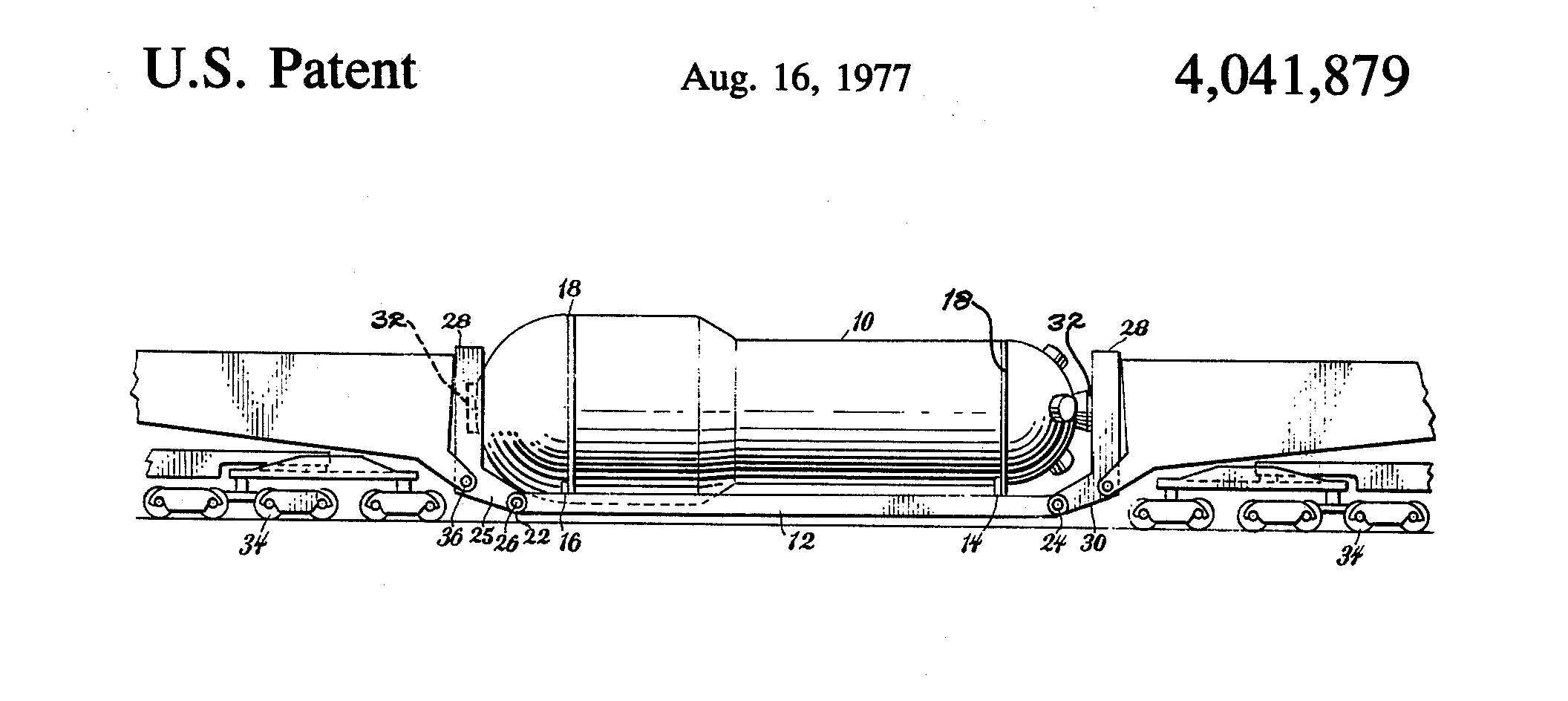
US patent image

== See also ==
- Class U special wagon
