= Tadeusz Thullie =

Polish royal secretary

Tadeusz Mikołaj Thullie
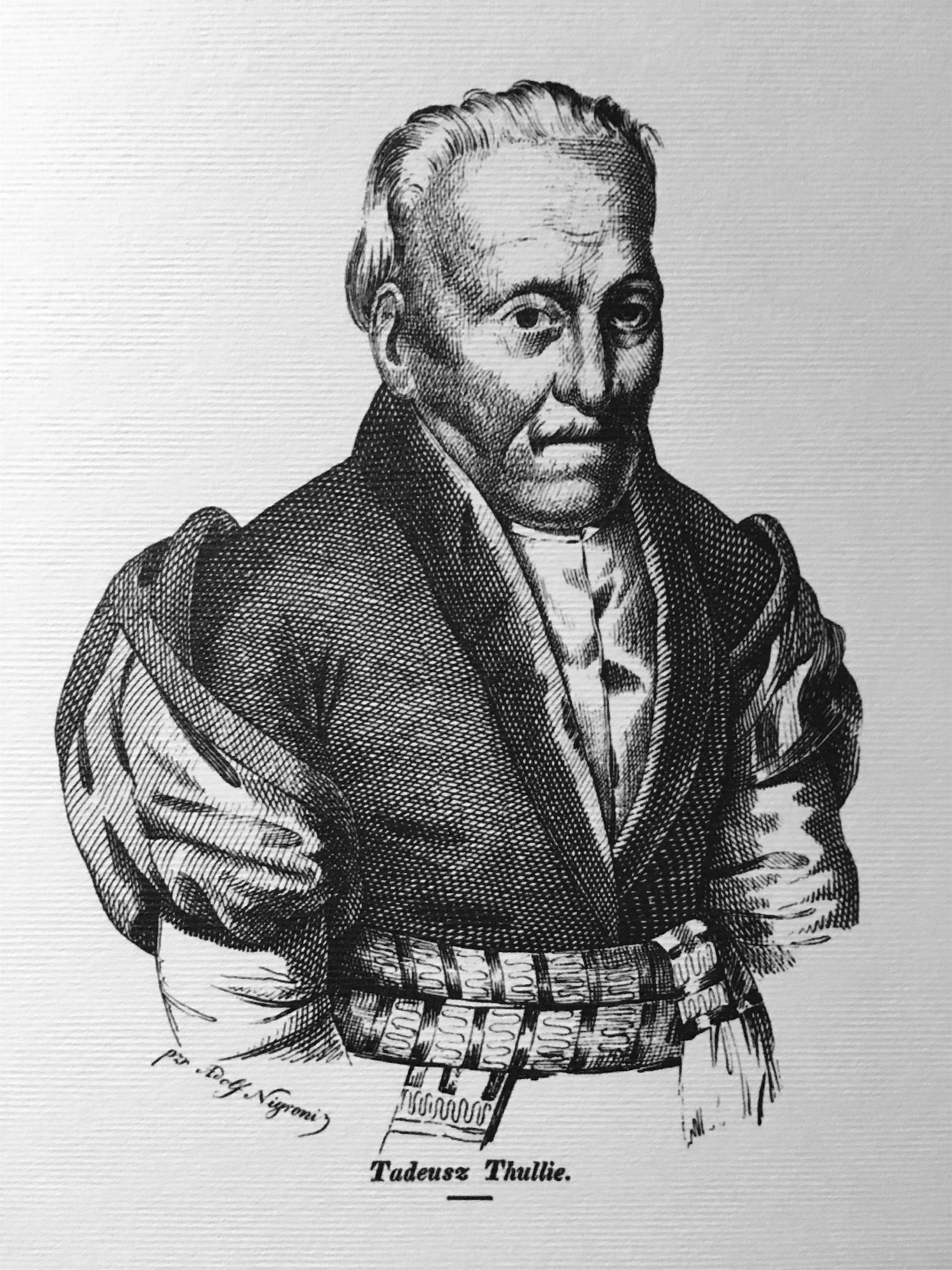
- Born: 6 December 1741; Warsaw
- Died: 14 April 1843 (aged 101); Lwów
- Occupation: Royal secretary

Tadeusz Mikołaj Thullie (born 6 December 1741 in Warsaw, died 14 April 1843 in Lwów) was the last Royal Secretary of King Stanisław August Poniatowski. He was ennobled in 1767, receiving the Prawdzic coat of arms. He was the son of Adam Thullie, lieutenant general of the Polish army, and Katarzyna née Fontana, a sister of royal architect Jakub Fontana.

Tadeusz's grandfather, Jan Thullie, had been brought to Poland from France by hetman Adam Mikołaj Sieniawski. He was a doctor in the army and the French navy. After arriving in Poland, he became chief medical officer of the Polish army and a lay judge in Lwów.

== Marriage ==
From his first marriage with Joanna Głębocka, Tadeusz Thullie had two sons and two daughters. From his second marriage with Rozalia Franchi, he had three daughters and five sons. His son Wincenty Thullie (1789–1868) was a playwright.

== Descendants ==
Tadeusz Thullie was the great-grandfather of Maksymilian Thullie and the great-great-grandfather of general Jan Thullie.

== Bibliography ==
- "Orgelbrand's Encyclopedia" (1898–1904), Vol. 14, p. 495
- Stanisław Sławomir Nicieja "Łyczaków: dzielnica za Styksem" (1998, p. 510)
