= Tadeusz Breyer =

Polish sculptor

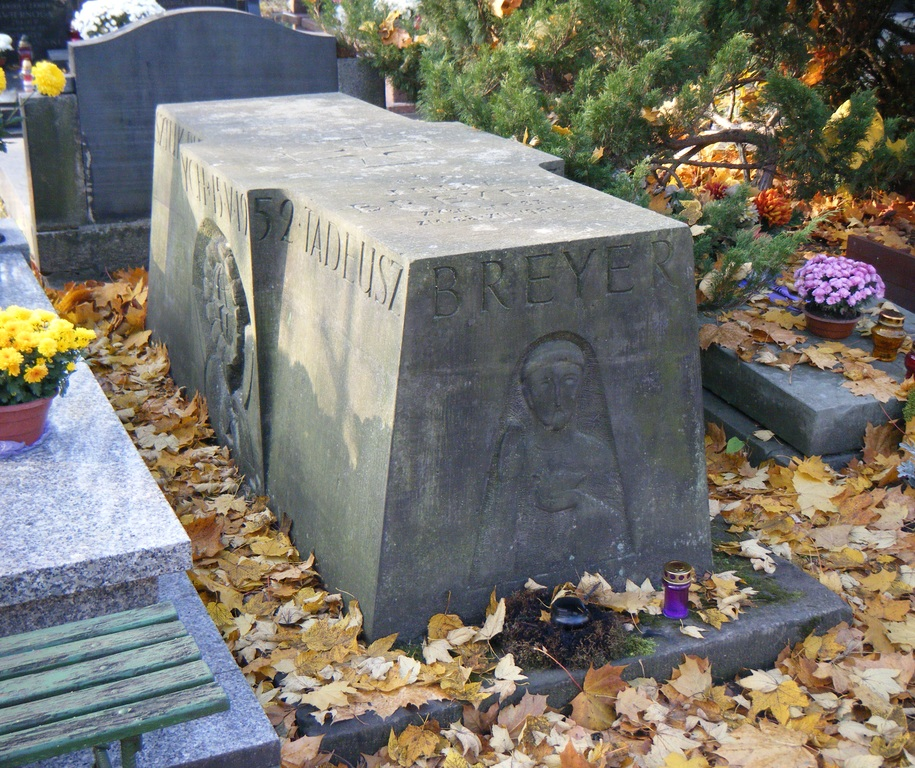
- The grave of Tadeusz Breyer. Powązki Cemetery, Warsaw
- Born: Tadeusz Breyer; 15 October 1874; Austria-Hungary, Mielec
- Died: 15 May 1952 (aged 77); Poland, Warsaw

Tadeusz Breyer (15 October 1874 in Mielec – 15 May 1952 in Warsaw) – Polish sculptor and medallic artist. He studied at the School of Fine Arts in Kraków. Then, he left for the Academy in Florence. In 1904 he moved to Warsaw. From 1910 to 1952, except for the periods of the world wars, he taught at the Academy of Fine Arts. While he worked at the academy he educated many Polish sculptors, e.g.: Alfons Karny, Józef Gosławski, Magdalena Gross, Ludwika Nitschowa and Franciszek Strynkiewicz. Most of his works were destroyed during the Second World War. The most famous of his sculptures is the monument of General Józef Sowiński, which is located in Warsaw.

== Bibliography ==
- Melbechowska Luty, Aleksandra (2005). Posągi i ludzie (in Polish). Warsaw: Neriton. ISBN 83-89729-40-7.
