= Karl-Gerät =

German self-propelled siege mortar

Karl-Gerät 040
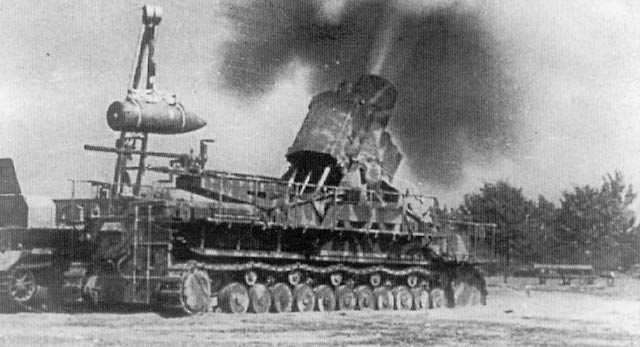
- 600 mm Karl-Gerät "Ziu" firing in Warsaw, August 1944
- Type: Self-propelled siege mortar
- Place of origin: Germany

Service history
- In service: 1941–1945
- Used by: Wehrmacht
- Wars: World War II

Production history
- Designer: Rheinmetall
- Designed: 1937–1940
- Manufacturer: Rheinmetall
- Produced: 1940–1942
- No. built: 7
- Variants: Gerät 041

Specifications
- Mass: 124 t (137 short tons) (firing)
- Length: 11.15 m (36 ft 7 in)
- Barrel length: 4.2 m (13 ft 9 in) L/7
- Width: 3.16 m (10 ft 4 in)
- Height: 4.38 m (14 ft 4 in) (firing)
- Crew: 21 (gun commander, driver, assistant driver, 18 gunners)
- Shell: Separate loading, cased charges
- Caliber: 600 mm (23.62 in)
- Breech: Horizontal sliding-wedge
- Recoil: Hydro-pneumatic
- Elevation: 55° to 70°
- Traverse: 8°
- Rate of fire: 1 round/10 min
- Engine: Daimler-Benz MB 503 A gasoline or Daimler-Benz MB 507 C diesel 430 kW (580 hp)
- Power/weight: 3.9 kW/t (4.8 hp/ST)
- Suspension: Torsion-bar
- Fuel capacity: 1,200 L (320 US gal)
- Operational range: 42 km (26 mi) (gasoline engine); 60 kilometres (37 mi) (diesel engine)
- Maximum speed: 6 to 10 km/h (4 to 6 mph)

Karl-Gerät 041
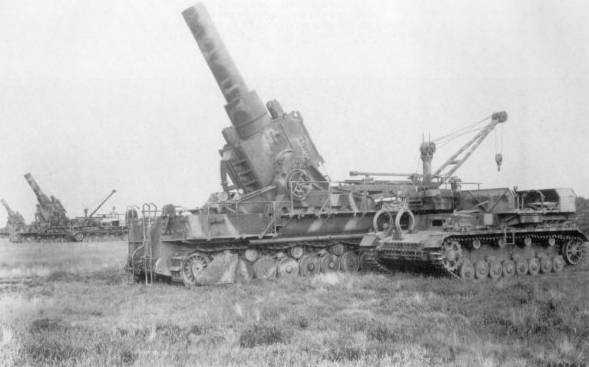
- A section of three 54 cm Gerät 041 in the field. The Munitionsschlepper is shown on the right.

Specifications
- Mass: 126.35 t (139.28 short tons) (firing)
- Length: 11.37 m (37 ft 4 in)
- Barrel length: 6.24 m (20 ft 6 in) L/11.55
- Width: 3.16 m (10 ft 4 in)
- Height: 4.38 m (14 ft 4 in) (firing)
- Caliber: 54 cm (21 in)

Karl-Gerät (040/041) (lit. 'Karl-device' in German), also known as Mörser Karl, was a World War II German self-propelled siege mortar (Mörser) designed and built by Rheinmetall. Its heaviest munition was a 60 cm (24 in) diameter, 2,170 kg (4,780 lb) shell; the range for its lightest shell of 1,250 kg (2,760 lb) was just over 10 km (6 mi). Each gun had to be accompanied by a crane, a two-piece heavy transport set of railcars, and several modified tanks to carry shells.

Seven guns were built, six of which saw combat between 1941 and 1945. It was used in attacking the Soviet fortresses of Brest-Litovsk and Sevastopol, bombarded Polish resistance fighters in the Warsaw Uprising, participated in the Battle of the Bulge, and was used to try to destroy the Ludendorff Bridge during the Battle of Remagen. One Karl-Gerät has survived; the remainder were scrapped after the war.

== Development ==
In March 1936 Rheinmetall made a proposal for a super-heavy howitzer to attack the Maginot Line. Their initial concept was for a weapon that would be transported by several tracked vehicles and assembled on site, but the lengthy preparation time drove them to change it to a self-propelled weapon in January 1937. Extensive driving trials took place in 1938 and 1939 using the first Neubaufahrzeug tank prototype and a scale model to investigate the extremely high ground pressure and steering of such an enormous vehicle. Firing trials took place in June 1939. The full-scale driving trials were held at Unterlüss in May 1940. General Karl Becker of the Artillery was involved in the development, from whom the huge weapon gained its nickname.

In total, seven Karl-Gerät howitzers were manufactured. The first six had the nicknames "Adam" (later "Baldur"), "Eva" (later "Wotan"), "Thor", "Odin", "Loki", and "Ziu"; the seventh, the research and test weapon (Versuchs-Gerät), had no name. Delivery of the six production vehicles took place from November 1940 to August 1941.

In February 1941, discussions commenced concerning increasing the range of the weapon, and in May 1942, 54 cm (21 in) Gerät 041 barrels were ordered for the six vehicles. At a conference with Adolf Hitler in March 1943 it was stated that the first Gerät 041 would be delivered by June 1943, and the third by mid-August. Only three of the Gerät 041 barrels were actually completed for mounting on Karl-Gerät Nr. I, IV and V, although any vehicle could be converted to use the smaller weapon.

Twenty-two Panzer IV Ausf. D, E and F chassis were modified, with a superstructure capable of carrying four shells that replaced the turret, and outfitted with a crane as Munitionsschlepper für Karl-Gerät ammunition transporters/loaders. Two or three of these Munitionsschlepper were assigned to each weapon.

=== Variants ===
- Gerät 040: original model, with a shorter (L/7) 600-millimetre (24 in) calibre barrel
- Gerät 041: later model, with a long (L/11.55) 540-millimetre (21 in) calibre barrel.

== Description ==
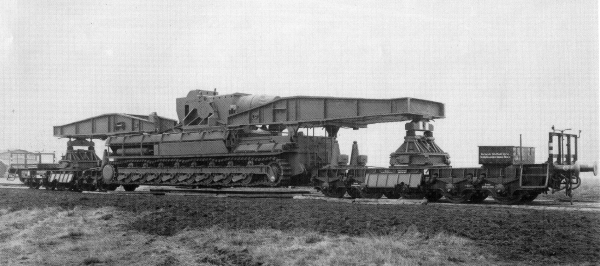
A Karl-Gerät on its twin-car rail transporter (schnabel car)

The 124-ton vehicle was propelled by a Daimler-Benz MB 503A 12-cylinder liquid-cooled gasoline engine or a Daimler-Benz MB 507C 12-cylinder liquid-cooled diesel engine, but this was mainly used for aiming (the mount had only 4 degrees of traverse on each side), as the engines provided a top speed of only 10 km/h (6.2 mph). For longer distances the Karl-Gerät was disassembled using a special 35-tonne (34-long-ton; 39-short-ton) mobile crane into seven loads. The chassis was loaded onto a six-axle Culemeyer-Strassenroller lowboy trailer. The other parts of the gun were lighter and used four-axle trailers. If the trailer with the chassis on board had to cross a bridge that couldn't carry their combined weight the chassis had to be off-loaded and driven across under its own power.

=== Long-range transport and preparation procedures ===
The weapon was moved long distances via rail on a variant of a Schnabel car; the whole chassis was hung between two huge pedestal-mounted swiveling arms fixed to five-axle bogies. When it reached its destination, the weapon was detached from railcars' supporting arms and driven to its intended firing location. The chassis of the ordnance was then lowered to the ground by "raising" the continuous track units' roadwheels by rotating their torsion-bar-sprung suspension arms to drop the chassis close to the ground to distribute the recoil forces more evenly in preparation for firing - the roadwheels for each trackset were also similarly "raised" to allow the tracks to clear the rails while being transported by rail, between the pair of Schnabel railcars. The Karl-Gerät proved to have no problems moving over normal soil, but under no circumstances was it allowed to make turns on soft soil lest it throw a track. The chassis had to be backed into position to fire, which expedited movement to a new position, but the land to be used for the ordnance's firing position had to be precisely leveled and the approach route prepared ahead of time to fill in soft spots and any ditches, etc. The mortar could only be loaded at zero elevation, so it had to be re-aimed between shots.

== Automotive features ==
The various Karl-Geräte used two different types of transmissions, engines and suspension system in a bewildering set of combinations. The table below outlines how each vehicle was outfitted. After May 1944 the gasoline engines were replaced by diesels. Little information is available for No. VII, the experimental model, and the data below must be regarded as unconfirmed.

No.	I	II	III	IV	V	VI	VII
Nickname	Adam/Baldur	Eva/Wotan	Thor	Odin	Loki	Ziu	None
Ausf.	1	2	3	3	4	5	6
Engine	MB 503 A	MB 503 A	MB 507 C	MB 507 C	MB 507 C	MB 503 A	MB 503 A
Transmission	3-speed Ardelt	3-speed Voith Turbo	4-speed Ardelt	4-speed Ardelt	3-speed Voith Turbo	3-speed Voith Turbo	4-speed Ardelt
Speed	10 km/h	10 km/h	6 km/h	6 km/h	6 km/h	6 km/h	6 km/h
Range (km)	42	42	60	60	60	42	42
Roadwheels (number per side/rim type)	8 rubber	8 rubber	11 steel	11 steel	11 steel	11 steel	11 steel
Return rollers	8 rubber	8 rubber	6 rubber	6 rubber	6 rubber	6 rubber	6 rubber
Torsion bars (mm)	2600	2600	2115	2115	2115	2115	2115
Track pitch (mm)	170	170	250	240	240	240	240
Link per side	133	133	94	94	94	94	94
Sprocket teeth	17	17	12	12	12	12	12

== Ammunition ==
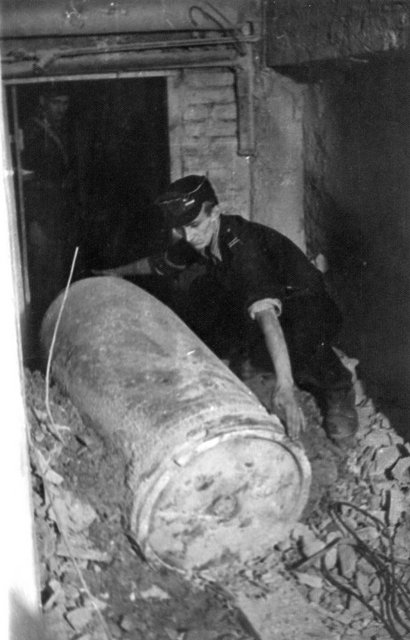
A dud shell fired by a Karl-Gerät at the basement of Prudential House during the Warsaw Uprising

The original heavy 600 mm (24 in) concrete-piercing shells (schwere Betongranate) made a crater up to 15 m (49 ft) wide and 5 m (16 ft) deep. More range was desired and the light concrete-piercing shell (leichte Betongranate) 040 was introduced in 1942. Firing trials for the 540 mm (21 in) shells were not completed until the end of 1944 and they were not used in combat before then. The original 600 mm heavy shell had no designation other than the name. The Gerät number was added for the newer shells.

Shell	Caliber mm (in)	Weight kg (lb)	Weight of explosive fill kg (lb)	Muzzle velocity m/s (ft/s)	Max range m (yd)	Penetration m (ft)
heavy concrete-piercing shell (schwere Betongranate)	600 (24)	2,170 (4,780)	289 (637)	220 (720)	4,320 (4,720)	2.5 (8.2) + of concrete
light concrete-piercing shell (leichte Betongranate) 040	600 (24)	1,700 (3,700)	220 (490)	283 (930)	6,440 (7,040)	2.5 (8.2) + of concrete
light concrete-piercing shell (leichte Betongranate) 041	540 (21)	1,250 (2,760)	no data	378 (1,240)	10,060 (11,000)	3–3.5 (9.8–11.5) of concrete
high-explosive shell (Sprenggranate) 041	540 (21)	no data	no data	no data	no data	no data

== Combat history ==
=== 1941 ===
On 3 January 1941 Heavy Battery (schwere Batterie) 833 was created at the Bergen training ground and ordered to be combat ready by 15 February 1941. On 2 April 1941 it was expanded into Heavy Artillery Battalion (schwere Artillerie Bataillon) 833. The original Batterie 833 was redesignated as the first battery of the new battalion and a new second battery was formed, each battery having two howitzers, with orders to be combat ready by 1 May 1941 in preparation for Operation Barbarossa. Initially a single battery was to be deployed against the Soviet fortress at Brest-Litovsk, but that was changed by 14 May 1941 when the other battery was ordered to attack the Soviet border fortifications near Lviv. The first battery was assigned to IV Army Corps of 17th Army of Army Group South near Lviv while the second battery was ordered to support the attack by the 4th Army of Army Group Center against the Brest Fortress. The batteries were issued 60 and 36 rounds respectively.

Little is known of First Battery's operations except that IV Army Corps reported on 23 June that the battery was no longer needed and was no longer operational due to technical deficiencies. Second Battery's weapons had some assembly problems, issues with the electrical firing mechanism and non-standard ammunition, not surprising for the Karl-Gerät's combat debut, but managed to fire 31 of their 36 rounds by 24 June. It was ordered home that day by Army Group Center where the battalion was ordered to reform with eight 21 cm (8.3 in) Mörser 18 howitzers on 6 August 1941.

=== 1942 ===
In preparation for the attack on Sevastopol scheduled for the early summer Heavy Artillery Battalion 833 was ordered to form a Karl-Batterie with three weapons on 18 February 1942, two of which were "Thor" and "Odin". Camouflaged firing positions 15 metres (49 ft) long, 10 metres (30 ft) wide and 3 metres (10 ft) deep had to be dug for each howitzer to minimize Soviet counter-fire before they could move into position. On 20 May 1942 the 11th Army reported all three Karl-Geräte were at the front with a total of 72 heavy and 50 light concrete-piercing shells. LIV Army Corps reported that 19 heavy shells were fired between 2 and 6 June, 54 on 7 June and all 50 light shells between 8 and 13 June. More shells (29 heavy and 50 light) were shipped to the battery before the end of the month. All 50 light shells were fired on 30 June and 25 heavy shells the following day. Many of these shells were fired at the two 305-millimetre (12.0 in) twin-gun armored turrets of the Maxim Gorkii coastal defense battery, although shells fired at the turrets had little effect other than to jam one of the turrets and possibly knock out electrical power to the turrets, both of which were repaired without too much trouble. They did rather more damage to the concrete structure supporting the turrets as well as the command center located some 600 metres (2,000 ft) away (called the Bastion by the Germans). On 19 July 1942 the battery was ordered to ship their weapons to Hillersleben for refurbishment. One dud shell was recovered by the Soviets and flown to Moscow for evaluation.

On 7 July 1942 Heavy Artillery Battalion 833 was ordered to form another battery with one or two Karl-Geräte. This was done by 15 August as schwere Batterie 628 (Karl) with two weapons, although sufficient personnel to man three guns was to be furnished by Heavy Artillery Battalion 833. On 22 July the Army High Command (Oberkommando des Heeres (OKH)) issued an order to send the battery to Army Group North to support its planned offensive, Operation George (Unternehmen Georg), against Leningrad. The order for Georg, dated 22 August, specified Battery 628 with three guns, presumably with two operational guns and one in reserve was to participate. Army Group North reported the battery's arrival on 1 and 2 September 1942, but the Soviets preempted Georg with heavy attacks against the German forces besieging Leningrad so the Karl-Geräte didn't get into action.

On 18 October OKH ordered the 11th Army to transfer the battery as soon as possible to Leipzig, but the 11th Army asked to retain it to use in a new version of Georg to begin later that month. Georg was again postponed in late October, and later canceled. A new attack, code-named Feuerzauber (Fire Magic), was planned in which the battery was to participate, but it too was canceled after the Soviet encirclement of the German forces attacking Stalingrad. OKH finally recalled the battery on 4 December 1942 when it was clear that it had no mission.

=== 1943 ===
OKH issued orders to create a Heavy Artillery Battalion (Karl) on 4 May 1943 using the vehicles and equipment of Heavy Artillery Battery 628. This became the first battery of the new battalion while the other battery was raised from scratch on 15 May as was the battalion headquarters. Each battery had two Karl-Geräte plus one in reserve. 18th Army of Army Group North had plans to use one Karl-Gerät against the Oranienbaum Bridgehead west of Leningrad during the summer of 1943, but the battalion was ordered to return the Karl-Geräte to Leipzig on 8 August. Just like the 833rd the battalion was ordered to reform with eight 21 cm (8.3 in) Mörser 18 howitzers on 29 August 1943 with effect by 10 September. A Unit for Karl-Geräte (Kommando für Karl-Geräte) was formed on that same date as caretakers for the weapons. This was redesignated Unit for Special-Equipment of Heavy Artillery Battalion (motorized) (Kommando für Sonder-Gerät des schwere Artillerie-Abteilung (mot.)) 628 on 2 June 1944.

=== 1944 ===
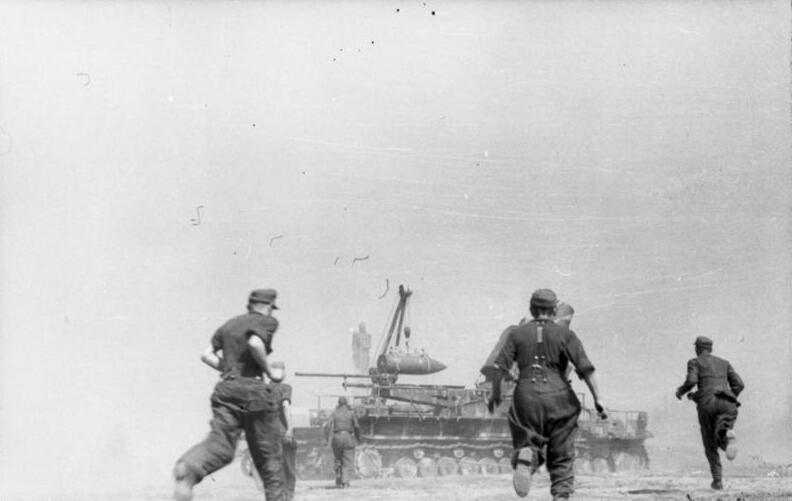
600 mm Karl-Gerät "Ziu" in front of general Józef Sowiński's statue in Warsaw, August 1944

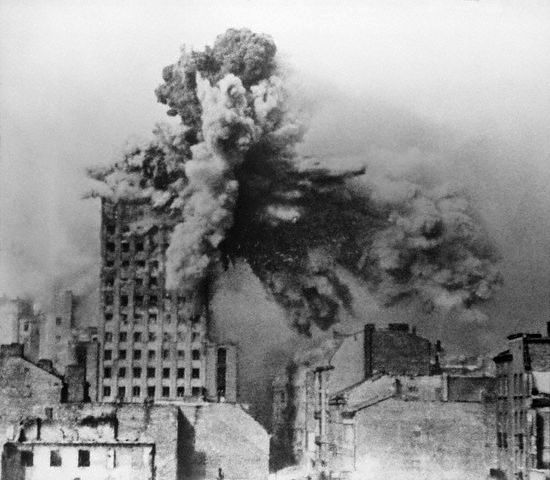
The Prudential House in Warsaw being hit by 2-ton mortar shell from a Karl-Gerät. The picture was taken by Polish soldier Sylwester Braun "Kris" on 28 August 1944.

On 13 August 1944 a battery was ordered to be created immediately with one 54 cm (21 in) Karl-Gerät and sent to the 9th Army to help it suppress the Warsaw Uprising. The next day the Kommando für Sonder-Geräte formed the Army Artillery Battery (Static) 638 Heeres-Artillerie Batterie (bodenständige) with 60 cm Karl-Gerät Nr. VI "Ziu" since no 54 cm weapon was available and a firing table had not yet been computed. It arrived at the Warsaw West railway station at 07:00 on 17 August 1944; the ammunition train arrived the following morning.

The mortar "Ziu" was set up in the Sowiński Park near the statue of general Józef Sowiński in Wola district. The 60 cm caliber mortar shells were designed to destroy bunkers. Often they did not explode when they hit buildings or soft ground in Warsaw. On 18 August 1944 a shell fired from mortar "Ziu" hit the building at Moniuszki 10 street, where the famous Warsaw restaurant "Adria" was located. The shell broke through several stories of the building, roof and floor of the restaurant and finally stopped in the basement, but it did not explode. Sappers of Polish Home Army disarmed the dud shell and removed the explosive charge. The explosive was used to produce hand grenades (Filipinkas) for Polish soldiers. The empty shell was left in the basement. In the mid-1960s during removal of ruins of the restaurant the shell was found. It was moved to the Polish Army Museum in Warsaw.

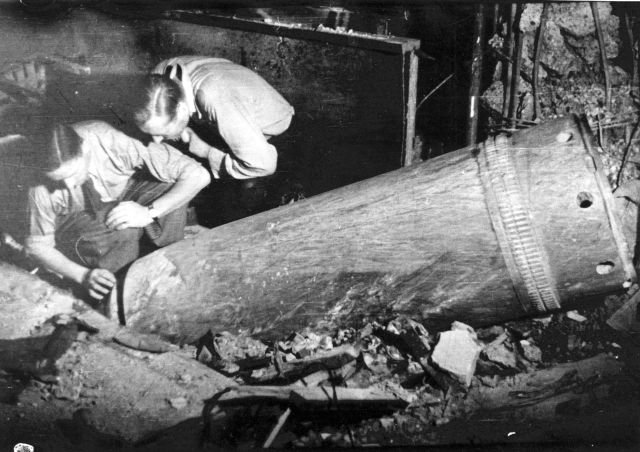
Warsaw Uprising: Sappers disarming a dud 600 mm mortar shell, which crashed through several stories and stopped in the basement of "Adria" townhouse at Moniuszki Street 10. From left: ppor. (second lieutenant) Stanisław Dutkiewicz "Pillert" i st. sierż. (master sergeant) Józef Gorzkowski "Szczepko".

On 30 August 1944, another dud shell from mortar "Ziu" was found in the basement of Prudential House located at Napoleon Square 9 (Plac Napoleona 9, now Plac Powstańców Warszawy). This shell was also disarmed by sappers of Polish Home Army.

After World War II a few more 60 cm dud shells were found in Warsaw. The most recent one was found on 28 August 2012 about 10 m (30 ft) below surface of the ground in the neighborhood of Plac Powstańców Warszawy during construction of the second metro line in Warsaw.

On 24 August 1944 OKH noted that it had been very successful in combat and ordered another Karl-Gerät sent to Warsaw. A second battery, numbered 428, was formed two days later by the Kommando für Sonder-Geräte, but it did not arrive at the Warsaw West railway station until 12:57 on 7 September 1944. A third Karl-Gerät 040 was shipped to Warsaw on 10 September and incorporated into Battery 428. "Ziu" needed repairs and was shipped on 22 September back to Jüterbog. At some point a fourth Karl-Gerät was shipped to Warsaw as it was reported as operational on 25 September.

==== Report ====
A meeting was held on 29 September by the OKH General der Artillerie to discuss the overall status of the Karl-Gerät, its supporting equipment and ammunition:

1. Karl-Geräte
Gerät Nr. I: Set up for both 040 and 041. Currently equipped as 040, assigned to Battery 428.
Gerät Nr. II: Only set up as 040. Currently being overhauled in Jüterbog. Motor installation will be completed in about 14 days.
Gerät Nr. III: About 14 days ago the gun tube blew apart while test firing. Only about 50% is reusable. Hitler has decided that this :Gerät is to be restored to full operating condition. However, the schedule for restoring it isn't known.
Gerät Nr. IV: Set up for both 040 and 041. Currently equipped as 040, assigned to Battery 428.
Gerät Nr. V: Set up for both 040 and 041. Equipped as a 040, it will be sent to Battery 638 in Budapest.
Gerät Nr. VI: Only set up as 040. Came back from employment in Warsaw. Repairs will be completed in about 20 days.
Gerät Nr. VII: Versuchs-Gerät for 041. Currently with the Waffenamt for test firing and obtaining firing table data. It is not currently operational because important components (engine) are being overhauled and won't be operational before April 1945.
2. Guns
Six 54 cm (21 in) 041 guns have been ordered. Three have been completed and are stored in Jüterbog. A decision on the other three is requested because delivery will take at least 14 months.
3. 35 tonne Crane
Karl-Geräte can only be employed when each battery has a 35-tonne crane. Two are in service, one is in Jüterbog without its trailer, which was destroyed by fire.
4. Culemeyer-Strassenroller

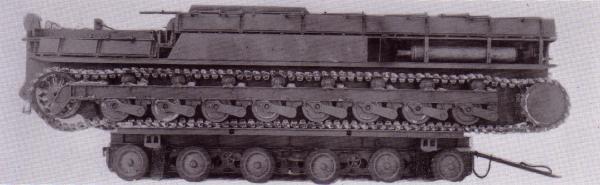
A Karl-Gerät ready for road transport aboard its Culemeyer trailer

Each battery needs one complete set of these heavy transport trailers. The two sets in service are set up for 040. Three 16-wheel trailers set up for 040 are available. Another 24-wheel trailer must be acquired to employ any additional Mörser Karl.
5. Munitionsschlepper
13 total, of which 6 are with Batteries 428 and 638, 2 with the Weapon Department (Waffenamt) for 040, 2 converted to 041 and 2 available.
6. Ammunition
a. Munition 040: 264 shells are immediately available, of which 150 are planned to be allotted to Battery 638. Another 96 will be completed in the next few days. 241 round are in Unterlüß to change their high explosive filler. About 10 completed daily. Part of the cartridges must be reworked. Powder testing will occur on 5 October so that the rest of the ammunition can be refilled.
b. Munition 041: 50 concrete-piercing shells have been delivered to Hillersleben to be shot for firing table data in early October. 25 shells will still be delivered by the end of September, another 25 by the end of October, from then on 50 per month are planned. 50 high-explosive shells (Sprenggranaten) are to be completed for firing table data in November. In early 1945 a total of 60 HE and concrete-piercing shells are to be produced monthly.

Three days later Battery 638 was ordered to transfer to Budapest and was loaded without any Karl-Gerät. Nr. V was rerouted to Budapest to equip the battery. Battery 428 followed on 10–11 October 1944. Both batteries were ordered back to Warsaw on 19 October, although they didn't arrive until 28 October. On 6 November Battery 638 transferred one Karl-Gerät 040 to 428 and returned to Jüterbog on 10 November to rearm with a Gerät 041. Battery 428 didn't remain near Warsaw much longer and departed for Jüterbog itself on 15 November.

Battery 428 exchanged its guns for Nr. II and VI (both with Gerät 040) and departed for the West on 14 December 1944 to participate in Operation Watch on the Rhine (Unternehmen Wacht am Rhein), which would be known by Americans as the Battle of the Bulge, but didn't reach the front until 29 December. Battery 628 followed on 20 December after equipping with Nr. IV, the first 54 cm Gerät 041 to be committed to battle.

=== 1945 ===
Little is known of their activities during the battle, but Gerät Nr. II was damaged en route by a bomb and was back in Jüterbog on 6 January 1945. It was repaired using parts from Karl Nr. I by 3 February. Gerät Nr. IV was damaged by a number of penetrating hits and arrived in Jüterbog on 31 January. Gerät Nr. VI was still at the front on 19 January. In the meantime Nr. V was modified to use the 54 cm howitzer and had its engine rebuilt.

Battery 628 was initially ordered to the Vistula Front on 7 March, but this was countermanded on 11 March when it was rerouted towards Remagen, where the Allies had recently captured the Ludendorff Bridge. Karl-Batterie 638 arrived on 20 March, but after only 14 rounds that missed all of the bridges and only damaged a handful of random houses, the weapon had to be moved to the rear for repairs. Batterie 428 was also ordered towards Remagen on 11 March, but was rerouted to the 1st Army sector instead.

A status report dated 22 March showed Geräte Nr. I and IV were still at Jüterbog, with Nr. I configured as a 040 and Nr. IV to be completed as a 041. Geräte Nr. II and V had left for the front on 11 and 10 March respectively. Gerät Nr. VI was returning to Jüterbog with engine damage. Gerät Nr. III had been virtually destroyed and only the gun breech was salvageable. Gerät Nr. VII needed parts and wasn't going to be made operational anytime soon.

Battery 628 was ordered disbanded on 11 April and its personnel incorporated into Battery 428, although it's unlikely that either unit actually saw action except in local defense.

== Fates ==
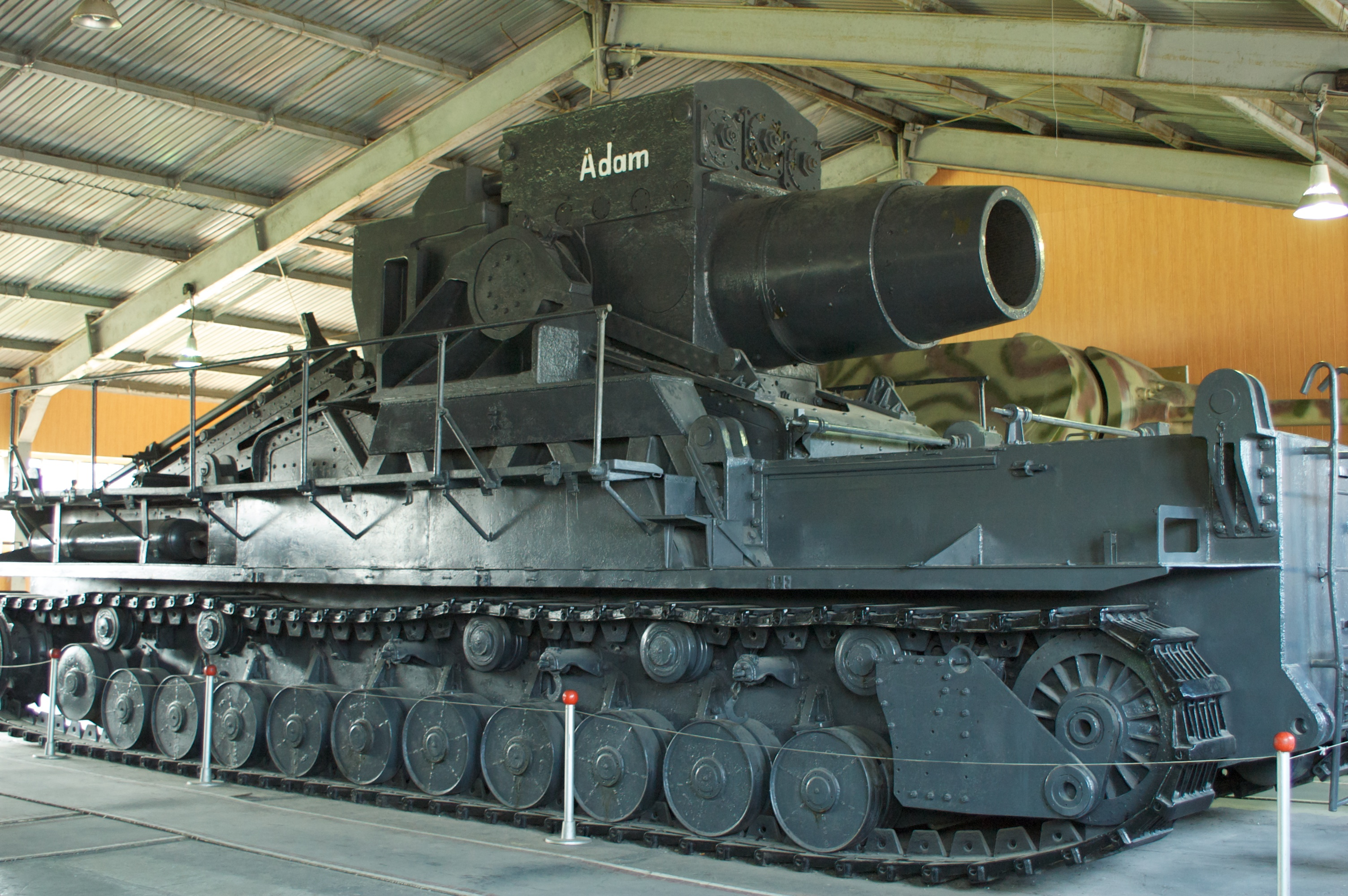
Karl-Gerät "Ziu" marked as "Adam" at the Kubinka Tank Museum, Russia.

In 1945, Nr. II ("Eva") as well as Nr. V ("Loki") were captured by US forces in the period 21 March to 11 April 1945. Nr. VII, the test weapon, was captured by the US Army in Hillersleben and shipped to Aberdeen Proving Grounds but later scrapped. Nr. VI ("Ziu") was captured by the Red Army, probably when they overran Jüterbog on 20 April 1945. This is on display at the Kubinka tank museum, although marked as Nr. I ("Adam"). Nr. IV ("Odin") was also captured by the Red Army. The fates of guns Nr. I ("Adam") and Nr. III ("Thor") are unknown.

== See also ==
- Siege artillery
- List of the largest cannon by caliber

== Bibliography ==
- Chamberlain, Peter & Doyle, Hillary: Encyclopedia of German Tanks of World War Two: The Complete Illustrated Directory of German Battle Tanks, Armoured Cars, Self-propelled guns and Semi-tracked Vehicles 1939–1945, Silverdale Books, 2004 ISBN 1-84509-012-8
- Jentz, Thomas (2001). Bertha's Big Brother Karl-Gerät (60 cm & 54 cm): The Super-Heavy Self-Propelled Mortar also known as Gerät 040/041 Nr. I-VII. Panzer Tracts. ISBN 0-9708407-2-1.
- Taube, Gerhard: Die schwersten Steilfeuer–Geschütze 1914 - 1945. Geheimwaffen 'Dicke Berta' und 'Karl', Motorbuch-Verlag, 1981 ISBN 3-87943-811-0
