= Wolska Street, Warsaw =

Street in Wola, Warsaw, Poland

Coordinates: 52.2303°N 20.9540°E

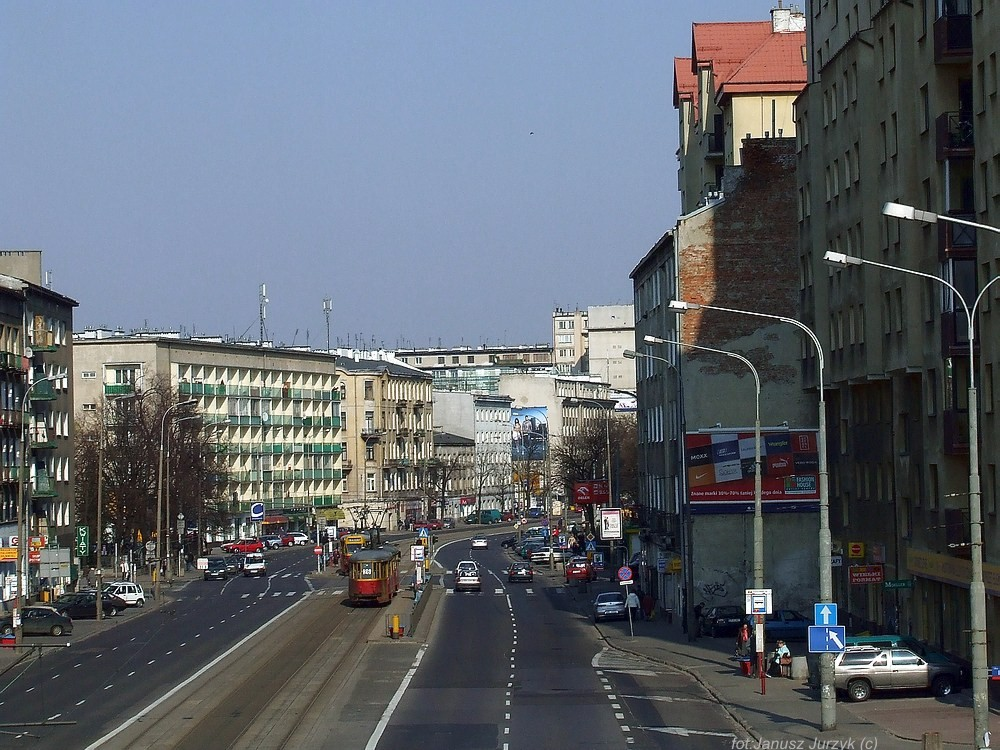
Ulica Wolska, Warsaw

Wolska (Polish: Ulica Wolska, lit. Wola Street) is the main artery of Warsaw's borough of Wola. Initially Wola district was but a western suburb of Warsaw and a road leading to it was dubbed "droga wolska" - Wola road. In 1725 parts of that road closest to the Warsaw Old Town, located along the Saxon Axis, were officially renamed to "Aleja Wolska" - Wola Avenue. In modern times it starts at a crossing of Chłodna and Towarowa Streets, and runs as a continuation of Solidarity Avenue through the neighbourhoods of Młynów, Czyste and Ulrychów, all the way to Połczyńska Street.
