= Prawdzic coat of arms =

Polish coat of arms

Prawdzic
- Alternative names: Prawda, Lew z Muru
- Earliest mention: 1372 and 1413
- Families: Archimowicz, Arciszewski, Babowski, Baranowski, Bączalski, Bentkowski, Bentkowski, Bereza, Bernatowicz, Berner, Beski, Będkowski, Bętkowski, Bendkowski, Biedkowski, Biegański, Bieguński, Bielski, Bietkowski, Bogacki, Borakowski, Borysowski, Borzyszkowski, Bratoszewski, Brochocki, Brochowski, Brodziński, Brudziński, Brudzyński, Brzeski, Buchałło, Buchałłowicz, Bugajło, Bujaczewski, Bujakowski, Bułakowski, Cebulski, Chotomski, Chrul, Chrulewicz, Chrybski, Cibulski, Cichorowski, Cichrowski, Ciemiewski, Ciemniejewski, Ciemniewski, Ciemnołęski, Ciemnołoński, Cybulski, Cydzik, Czebnowski, Czeczocki, Czeczot, Czeczotka, Czychrowski, Ćwikliński, Daniusiewicz, Dankiewicz, Dańkiewicz, Daszkowicz, Dębołęcki, Dębski, Domiechowski, Dowojno, Duranowski, Działowski, Dzwonowski, Filipowicz, Gałęski, Garlicki, Gawarzewski, Gaworzewski, Gedejt, Gidziński, Giełdanowski, Głębatowski, Gockowski, Goczałkowski, Goćkowski, Golemberski, Golemiński, Gołemberski, Gołembiewski, Gołębiowski, Gołymiński, Gołyński, Gorazdowski, Gorowski, Gorzuchowski, Gosczewski, Gosk, Gostomski, Gostyowski, Gościchowski, Gotomski, Gowarzecki, Gowarzewski, Gozdzichowski, Górowski, Gradomski, Gradowski, Gratta, Grecki, Grek, Grekowicz, Grodzanowski, Gromnicki, Grudowski, Gruja, Grzymułtowski, Gulcz, Gulczewski, Gulczyński, Gylowski, Gyłowski, Hejman, Hładki, Hoffer, Hownowski, Hunnowski, Hunowski, Iłowski, Imieniński, Izbicki, Izbiński, Jarosław, Jocewicz, Jodcewicz, Kaliciński, Kargoszyński, Karłowski, Kaski, Kasperowicz, Kenstoszowski, Kęskowski, Kinicki, Kinierski, Kiniorski, Kirzyński, Kmaczoła, Kobelski, Kobylnicki, Kochański, Kochowski, Kojadzki, Kokeli, Kokorski, Koniuszewski, Konojacki, Konsiadzki, Konsjadzki, Kornacki, Koruszyński, Koszelewski, Kozerski, Kozyrski, Kraśnik, Krupowicz, Kruszyński, Kryski, Kryszka, Krzeczkowski, Kurnicki, Krzyżewicz, Kucharski, Kukalski, Kukiewicz, Kukleński, Kuklinowski, Kurowski, Kurski, Kwaczała, Lang, Lank, Lantosz, Lasciewski, Laściewski, Latalski, Ląszewski, Leskowski, Leszczkowski, Leszkowski, Lewandowski, Lewicki, Lichtyan, Liszkowski, Lukocki, Lutecki, Lutocki, Lutomski, Łabiszyński, Łahiszewski, Łajszczewski, Łajszewski, Łakoszyński, Łakowicz, Łantosz, Łantowski, Łaszcz, Łaszewski, Łayszczewski, Łazarski, Łazęcki, Łaźniewski, Łaźniowski, Łażniewski, Łukomski, Macieszewski, Makosiej, Mańkowski, Marczewski, Mąkorski, Meciszewski, Męciszewski, Mękarski, Mękarzewski, Micewski, Micowski, Miczowski, Miekowski, Misiewski, Mlekicki, Młocki, Molski, Mołocki, Mukański, Mycowski, Narolski, Neledewski, Nieborowski, Nieborski, Niedziałkowski, Nieledewski, Nieledowski, Niemierza, Niemiński, Niewiarowicz, Nisielski, Nisilski, Niszczycki, Norejko, Nosalski, Obałkowski, Obrociwor, Obrowiecki, Olszewski, Omulecki, Oryszowski, Ożygalski, Pakosławski, Pakosz, Pałucki, Paris, Parten, Parys, Patek, Pawlucy, Petelczyc, Piwo, Piwoni, Piwonia, Piwoński, Płocki, Poczernicki, Poczyrnicki, Podczernicki, Policki, Porycki, Posienicki, Posieniecki, Potelczyc, Potocki, Pożarski, Prawda, Prawdzikowski, Pruski, Przytulski, Puiss, Radocki, Radzanowski, Rauschke, Rokitnicki, Romocki, Rubczyński, Rudczenko, Rudzki, Rynarzewski, Sarbiewski, Savtchenko-Belsky, Sawczenko, Sedlnicki, Sewerynowicz, Sętkowski, Siciński, Sieinski, Sieiński, Sierakowski, Słotwińscy, Sieprski, Słabosz, Smarzowski, Smarżewski, Smitkowski, Smitrowski, Sokołowski, Sołłohub, Sołohub, Sowiński, Stepankowski, Stroszewski, Stróżewski, Stróżowski, Strzałkowski, Strzemielecki, Strzemilecki, Suczka, Szakowski, Szamota, Szczawiński, Szedziński, Szejbak, Szejbakowski, Szopicki, Szuba, Szubski, Szymakowski, Śmijakowski, Śmijkowski, Tarczyński, Tarzecki, Tarzycki, Tomisławski, Trapszo, Trąbski, Trąmbski, Trębski, Trombski, Tuczampski, Tuczapski, Warmuntowicz, Wierzbiński, Wierzbowski, Winbiński, Witosławski, Włodek, Wołczek, Wołkochowski, Woźniak, Woźniakowski, Wożniakowski, Wrzedziński, Wyszomierski, Wyszomirski, Zajączkowski, Zassański, Ząb, Zdzieniecki, Złotnicki, Zubczewski, Zubienko, Zubowski, Zuchowicz, Zygmuntowski, Żabicki, Żeleński, Żmichowski,Żyszkowski, Żysznowski

Prawdzic (Prawdzik) was historically a Polish coat of arms. It was used by the nobility clans and later szlachta families in the times of the Kingdom of Poland (1385–1569) and Polish–Lithuanian Commonwealth.

== History ==
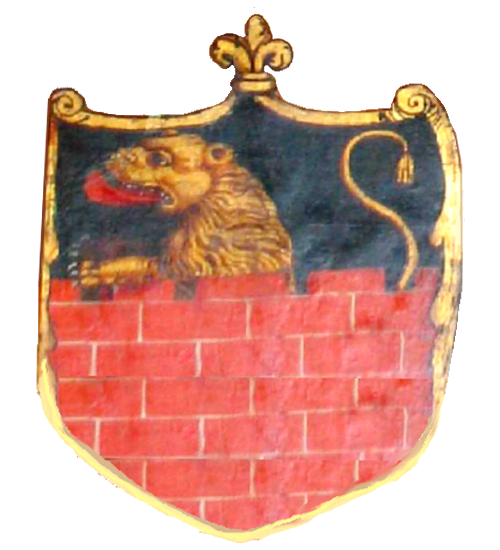
Prawdzic coat of arms, detail of Duke-Bishop Jan Latalski's painting

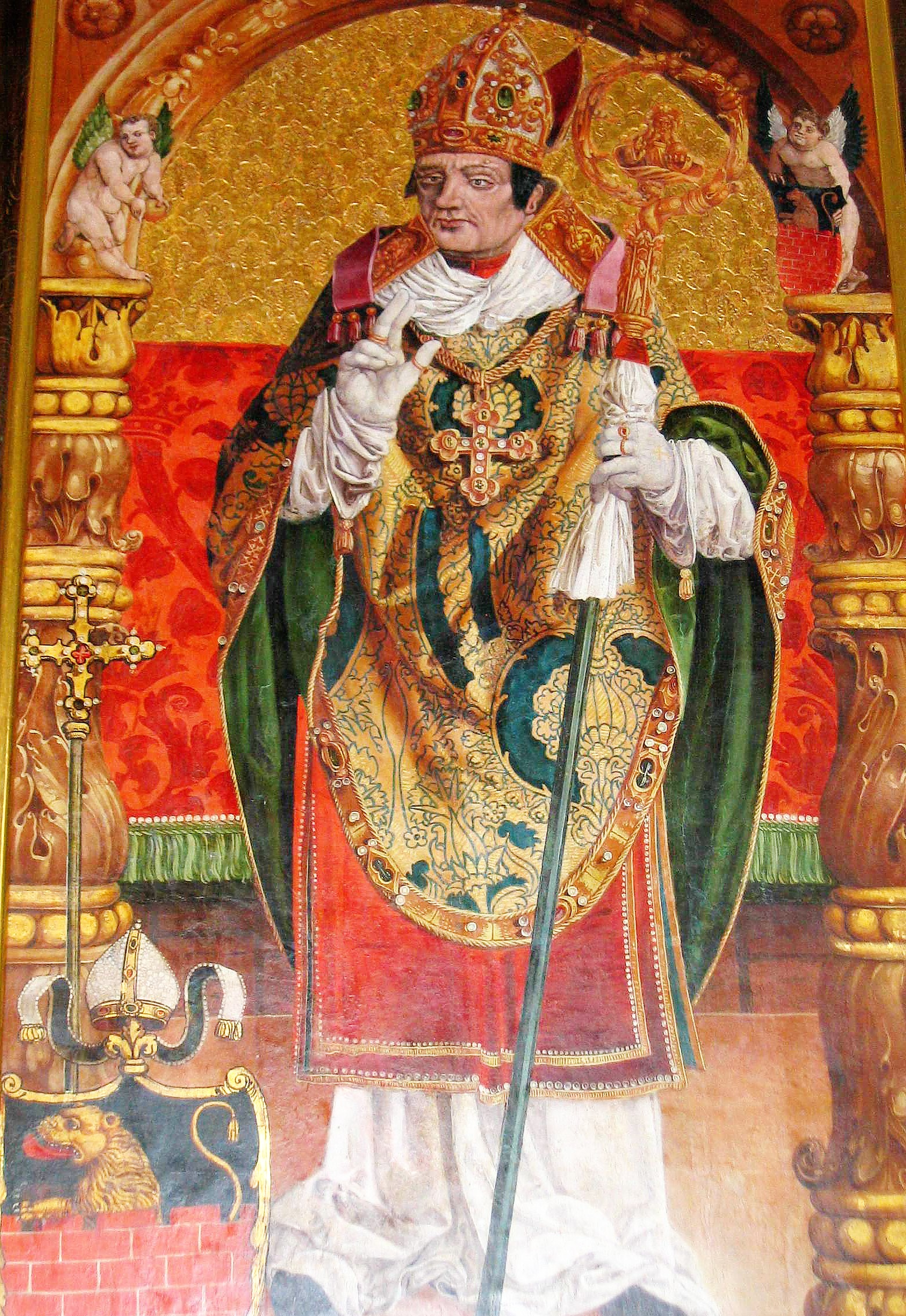
Jan Latalski's (Bishop of Poznań, Bishop of Kraków, Primate of Poland and Duke of Siewierz) anonymous painting from 16th century

== Motto ==
The motto of the Prawdzic coat of arms was Non sibi and Non sibi sed patriae, which is Latin for "not for self", and "not for self, but for country".

== Notable bearers ==
Notable bearers of this coat of arms include:

- Krzysztof Arciszewski - Polish artillery commander, officer and engineer, vice-governor of Dutch Brazil and head chief of Dutch military forces there
- Samuel Łaszcz - nobleman, famous soldier and infamous troublemaker during first half of the 17th century
- Antoni Patek - Polish pioneer in watchmaking and a creator of Patek Philippe & Co. one of the most famous watchmaker companies.
- Felix Kryski - Palantine Duke and Chancellor of Poland.
- Malgorzata Kryska -
- Tadeusz Thullie - last secretary of King Stanisław August Poniatowski

== See also ==
- Polish heraldry
- Heraldry
- Coat of arms
- List of Polish nobility coats of arms

== Bibliography ==
- Tadeusz Gajl: Herbarz polski od średniowiecza do XX wieku : ponad 4500 herbów szlacheckich 37 tysięcy nazwisk 55 tysięcy rodów. L&L, 2007, ss. 406-539. ISBN 978-83-60597-10-1.

== Sources ==
- Ornatowski.com
