= Józef Sowiński =

Polish artillery general (1777–1831)

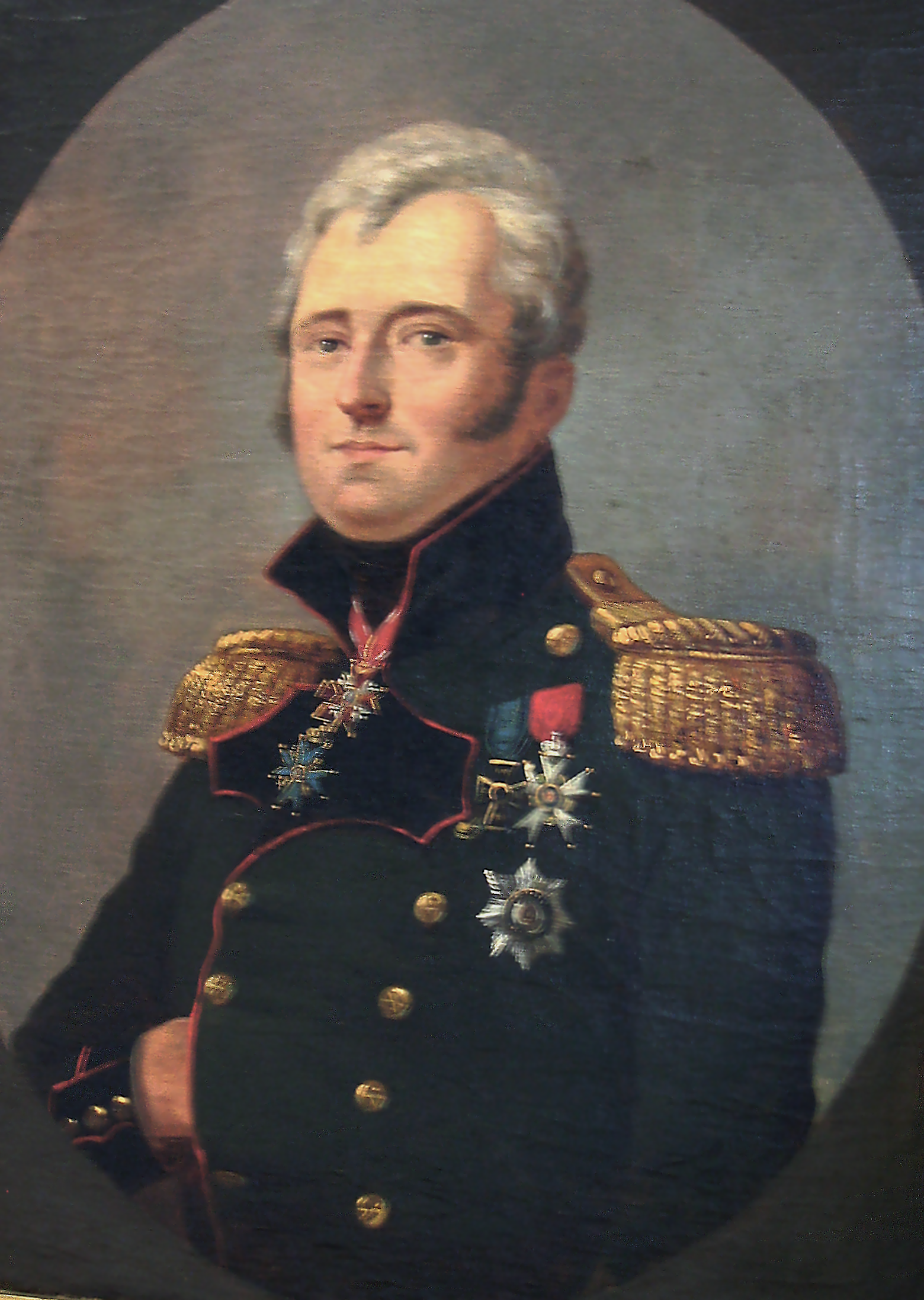
Józef Sowiński

Józef Sowiński (1777–1831) was a Polish artillery general and a hero of Poland's November 1830 Uprising.

== Life ==
Józef Longin Sowiński was born on 15 March 1777 in Warsaw. After graduating from the Corps of Cadets in Warsaw, he joined the Polish Army as a lieutenant during the 1794 Kościuszko Uprising. After its suppression and the dismemberment of Poland by Russia, Prussia, and Austria, Sowiński's regiment was drafted into the Prussian army. In 1807, he fought at the Battle of Eylau and received the highest Prussian military decoration, the Pour le Mérite.

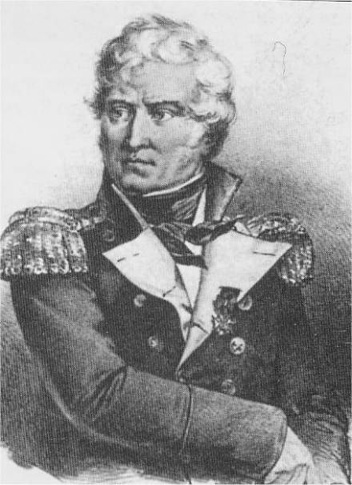
Józef Sowiński

In 1811, after Napoleon Bonaparte proclaimed the Duchy of Warsaw, Sowiński returned to Polish service. He fought in various battles of the Napoleonic Wars. During Napoleon's 1812 invasion of Russia he lost a leg at the Battle of Borodino, near the village of Mozhaysk. He was awarded the Polish Virtuti Militari and the French Legion of Honor. After the Congress of Vienna, he returned to Poland and served as commander of the Warsaw Arsenal of the Army of the Kingdom of Poland. In 1820 he became commandant of the Application School for officers.

After the outbreak of the November Uprising against Russia in 1830, Sowiński became artillery commander of the Warsaw garrison and head of the Government Commission of War (de facto Ministry of War). During the Russian assault on Warsaw on 6 September 1831, Sowiński personally commanded the defense of the Polish capital's western approaches. In what is now its Wola district, he commanded 1,300 men against 11 Russian battalions. His actions have been lauded as heroic.

According to recent historians, he was bayonetted to death by the Russians just after the surrender negotiations, who publicized a story that he had been killed at his post in combat.

== Legacy ==
Sowiński's death was immortalized by Polish poets, including Juliusz Słowacki in Sowiński w okopach Woli (Sowiński in the Wola Trenches). It was also the subject of a painting by Wojciech Kossak and of a ballad by Jacek Kaczmarski. Sowiński was mentioned in reverential terms by Chopin.

== See also ==
- List of Poles
