= Firlej family =

Polish noble family

Firlej (plural: Firlejowie) was a Polish szlachta (noble) family. They were magnates in the 15th–17th centuries.

== History ==
According to Kasper Niesiecki, Ostafi of Lewart coat of arms came from Franconia, Germany, to Poland, in 1317, to serve Polish king Władysław Łokietek. He was nicknamed Firlej, and the name became his family name. From the 15th to 17th centuries, the Firlej family was a powerful magnate family in the Lesser Poland (Małopolska) region.

From the time of Jan Firlej, the Firlej family were staunch Calvinists (Protestantism) condemned by Catholics. Although most of Jan's sons converted to Catholicism as early as the 1670s, one branch of the family persisted in Calvinism until the mid-17th century, when this one died out.

Over time, the Firlej family declined severely, the richest lines had no male descendants, and the poorer lines grew so large that they fell into the ranks of the middle and poor nobility.

The history of the Firlej family is not fully known or documented. Most historical descriptions end with the year 1730. In 1995 the Society of Friends of Janowiec was established in Janowiec, which organises meetings on the Firlej family and publishes cyclical studies.

== Notable members ==
- Piotr Firlej z Dąbrowicy (died 1499), judge and notary of Lublin, married to Jadwiga Osmólska h. Bończa
  - Mikołaj Firlej (died 1526), Great Hetman of the Crown, married to Anna z Mielca h. Gryf
    - Piotr Firlej (died 1553), voivode of Ruthenia, married Katarzyna Tęczyńska h. Topór
      - Jan Firlej (1521-1571), Grand Marshal of the Crown, married Barbara Mniszech h. Mniszech, Zofia Boner h. Boner, Zofia Dzik h. Doliwa
        - Mikołaj Firlej (died 1601), voivode of Kraków, married Elżbieta Ligęza h. Półkozic and Agnieszka Tęczyńska h. Topór
          - Mikołaj Firlej (1588–1635), voivode of Sandomierz, married Maria Amalia Mohyła and Regina Oleśnicka h. Dębno
            - Zbigniew Firlej (1613-1449), starost of Lublin, married Princes Anna Wiśniowiecka h. Korybut and Katarzyna Opalińska h. Łodzia
        - Andrzej Firlej (died 1609), castellan of Radom, married Barbara Kozińska and Marianna Leszczyńska h. Wieniawa
          - Andrzej Firlej (1583-1649), voivode of Sandomierz, married Helena Rohostajska h. Leliwa and HH Przyjemska h. Rawa
        - Jan Firlej (died 1614), Great Treasurer of the Crown, married Gertruda Opalińska h. Łodzia
          - Henryk Firlej (1599-1635), Bishop of Poznań
        - Piotr Firlej (died 1619), voivode of Lublin, married Jadwiga Włodek h. Prawdzic
          - Stanisław Firlej (died after 1659), castellan of Lublin, married Dorota Leśniowolska h. Roch II
            - Jan Firlej, member of the Sejm, married Teresa Warszycka h. Awdaniec
          - Piotr Firlej, castellan of Wojnice, married Agnieszka Bal z Boisk h. Gozdawa
          - Mikołaj Firlej (1605-1640), married Zofia Skotnicka h. Bogorya
            - Jan Firlej (died 1701), castellan of Sanok, married Weronika Wichrowska z Wichrowa
        - Henryk Firlej (1574-1626), Archbishop of Gniezno
      - Mikołaj Firlej (died 1588), voivode of Lublin, married Anna Sierzchowska z Sierzchowy h. Nałęcz
        - Zofia Firlej, married landlord of Wola Boguszowa Mikołaj Bogusz z Ziemblic h. Półkozic
        - Katarzyna Firlej, married wojski of Krzemieniec Teodor Sieniuta h. Sieniuta
      - Andrzej Firlej (c. 1537-1585), Royal Secretary and castellan of Lublin, married Barbara Szreńska h. Dołęga
        - Dorota Firlej (1563-1591), married voivode of Witebsk and Troki Prince Stefan Zbaraski h. Korybut and Grand Chancellor of the Crown and Hetman Lew Sapieha h. Lis
        - Anna Firlej (died 1588), married voivode of Brześć Kujawski Andrzej Leszczyński h. Wieniawa, great-grandmother of King Stanisław I Leszczyński
    - Katarzyna Firlej (died after 1545), married castellan of Chełmno and Sandomierz Stanisław Tarnowski h. Leliwa
- Marcin Firlej (born. 1975), Polish journalist and author.

== Palaces ==
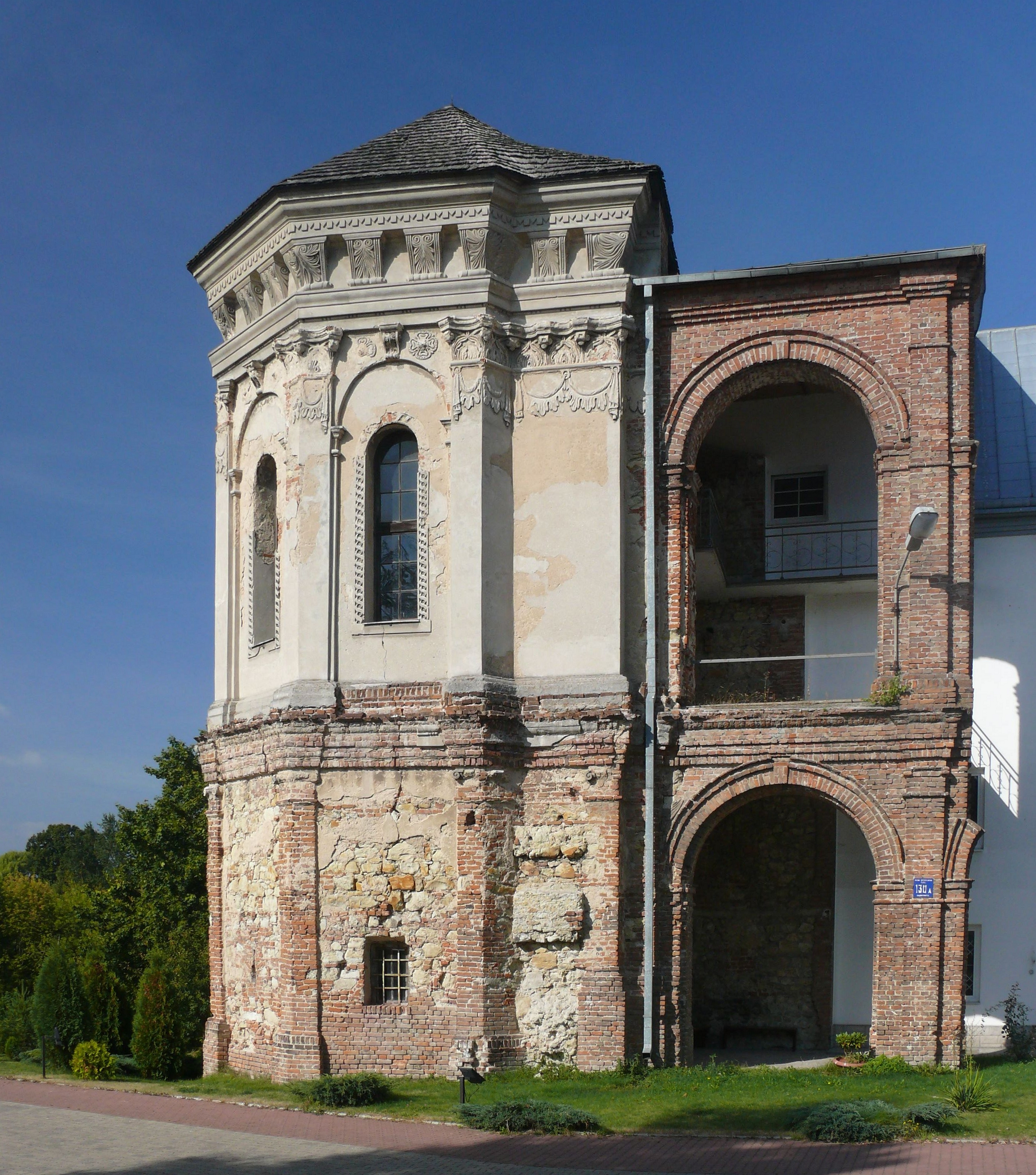
Ruins of the Castle of Dąbrowica

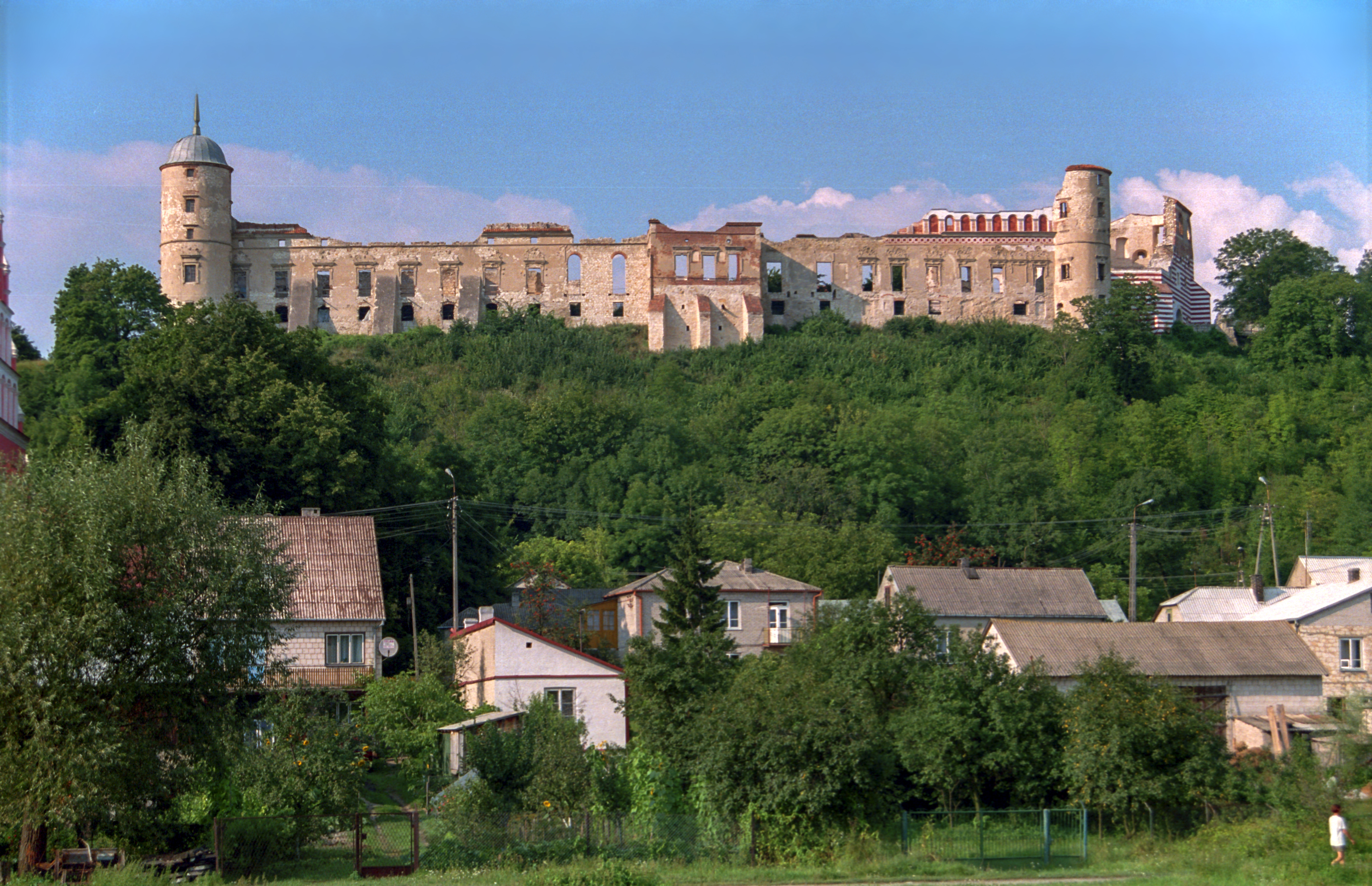
Castle of Janowiec (ruin)

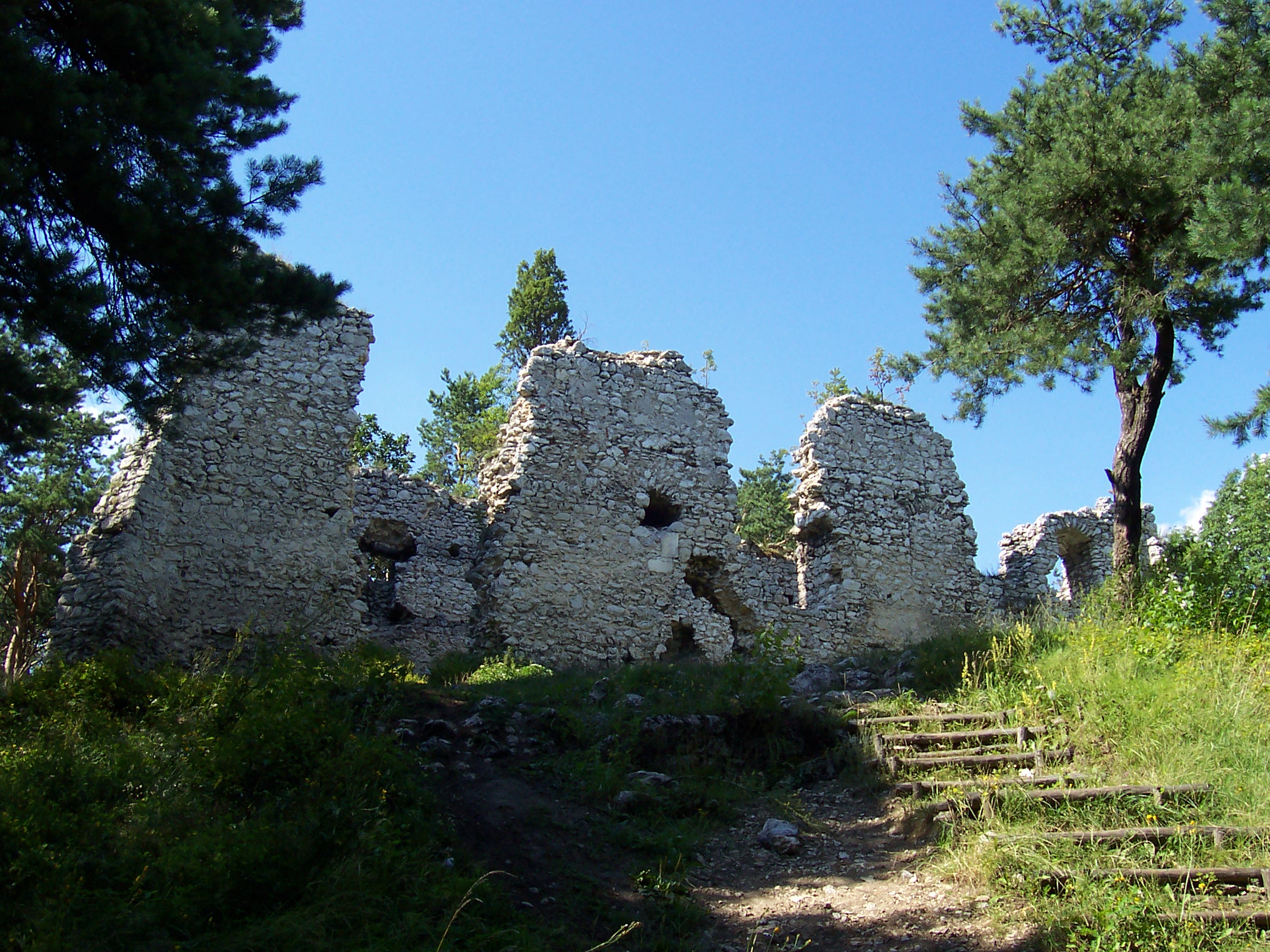
Castle of Bydlin (ruin)

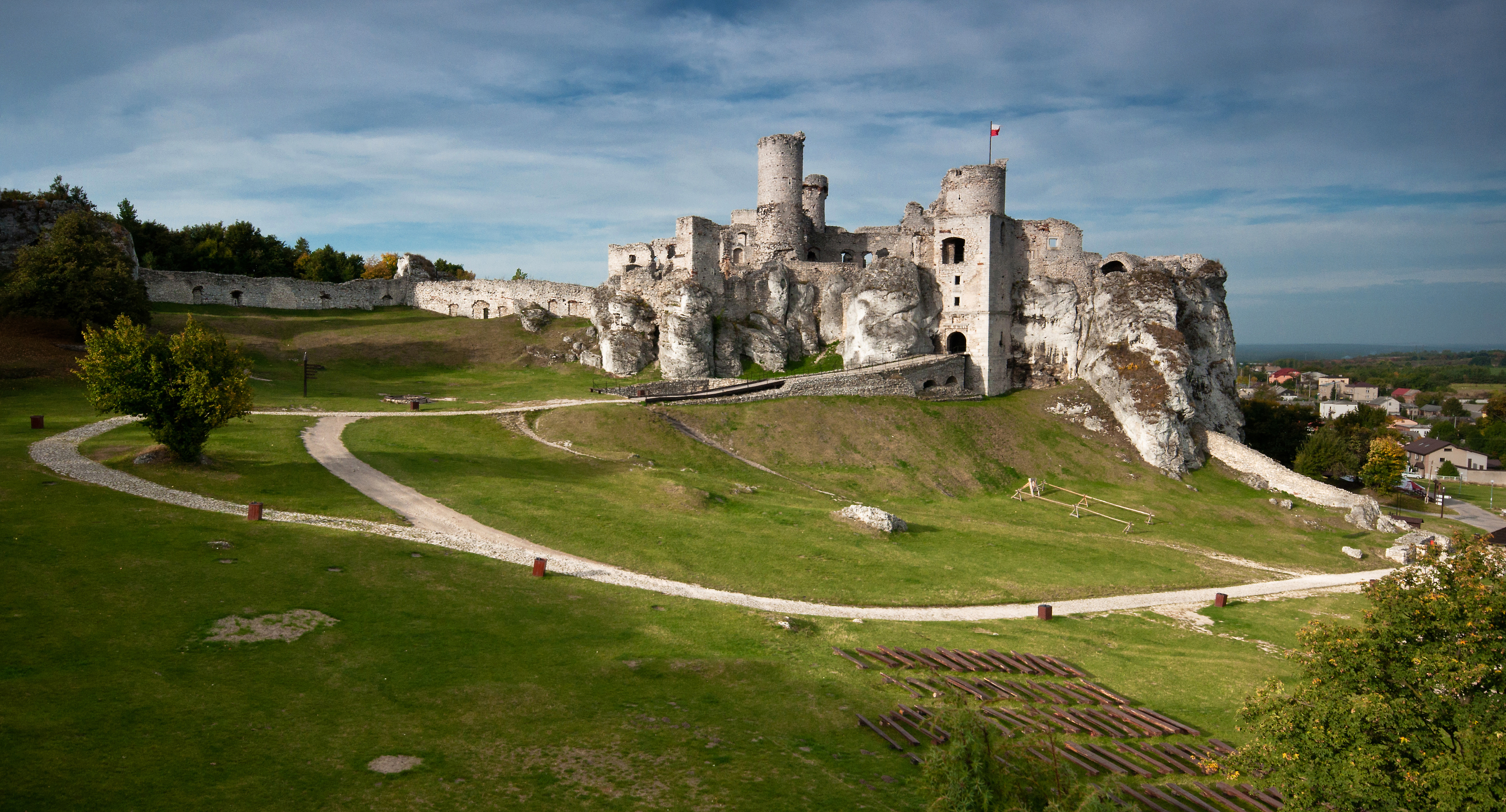
Castle of Ogrodzieniec (ruin)

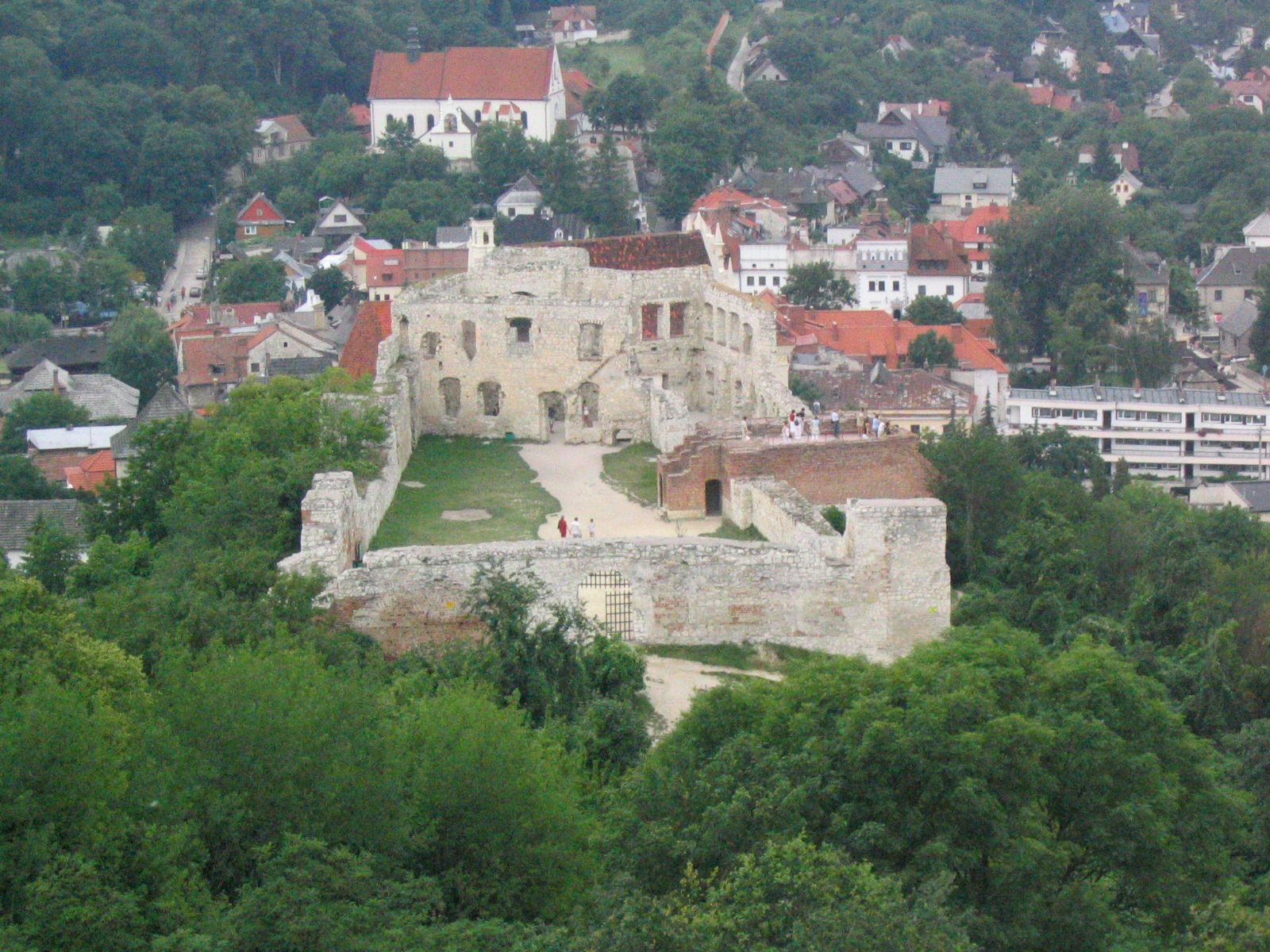
Castle of Kazimierz Dolny (ruin)

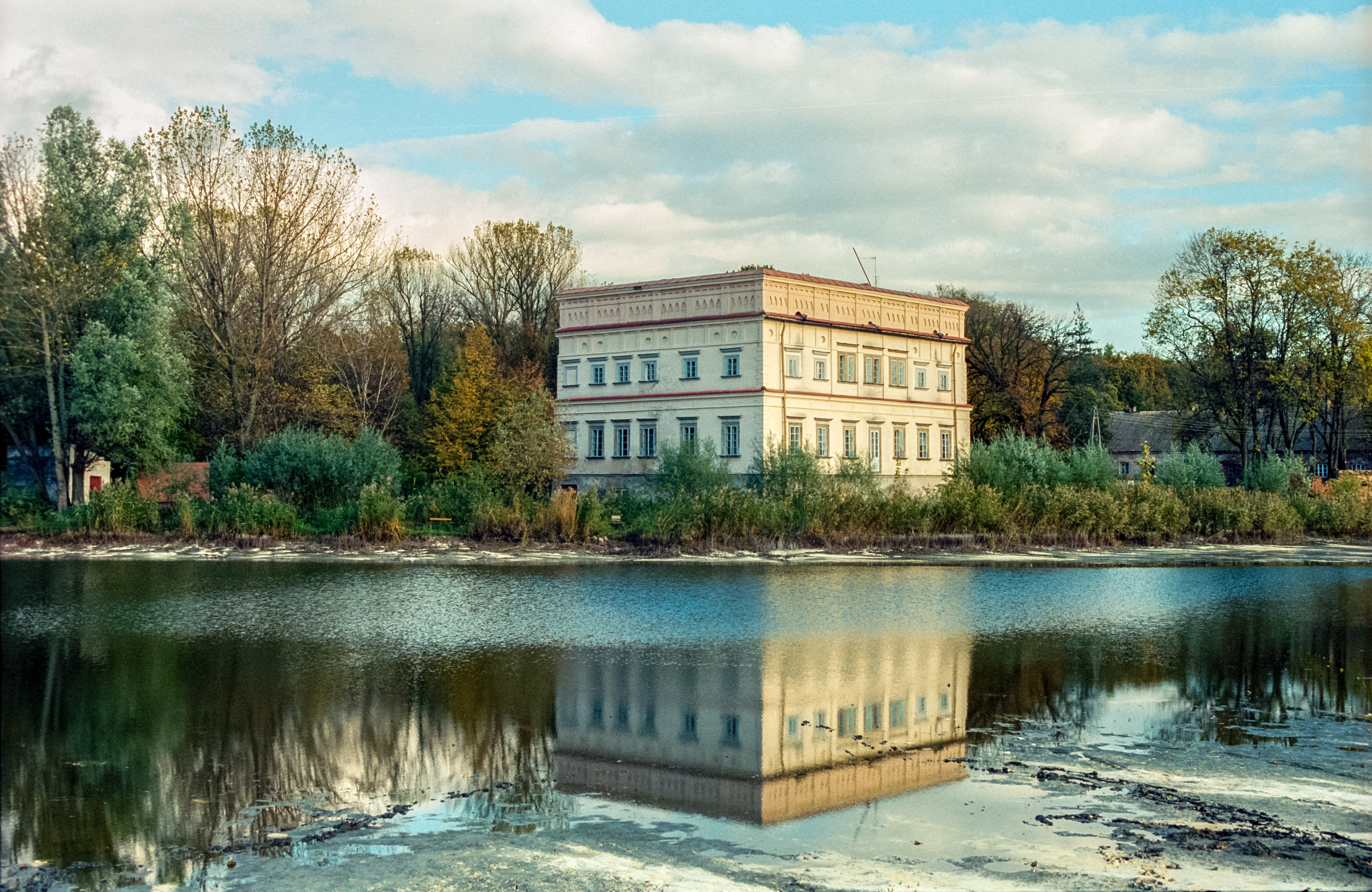
Castle of Czemierniki

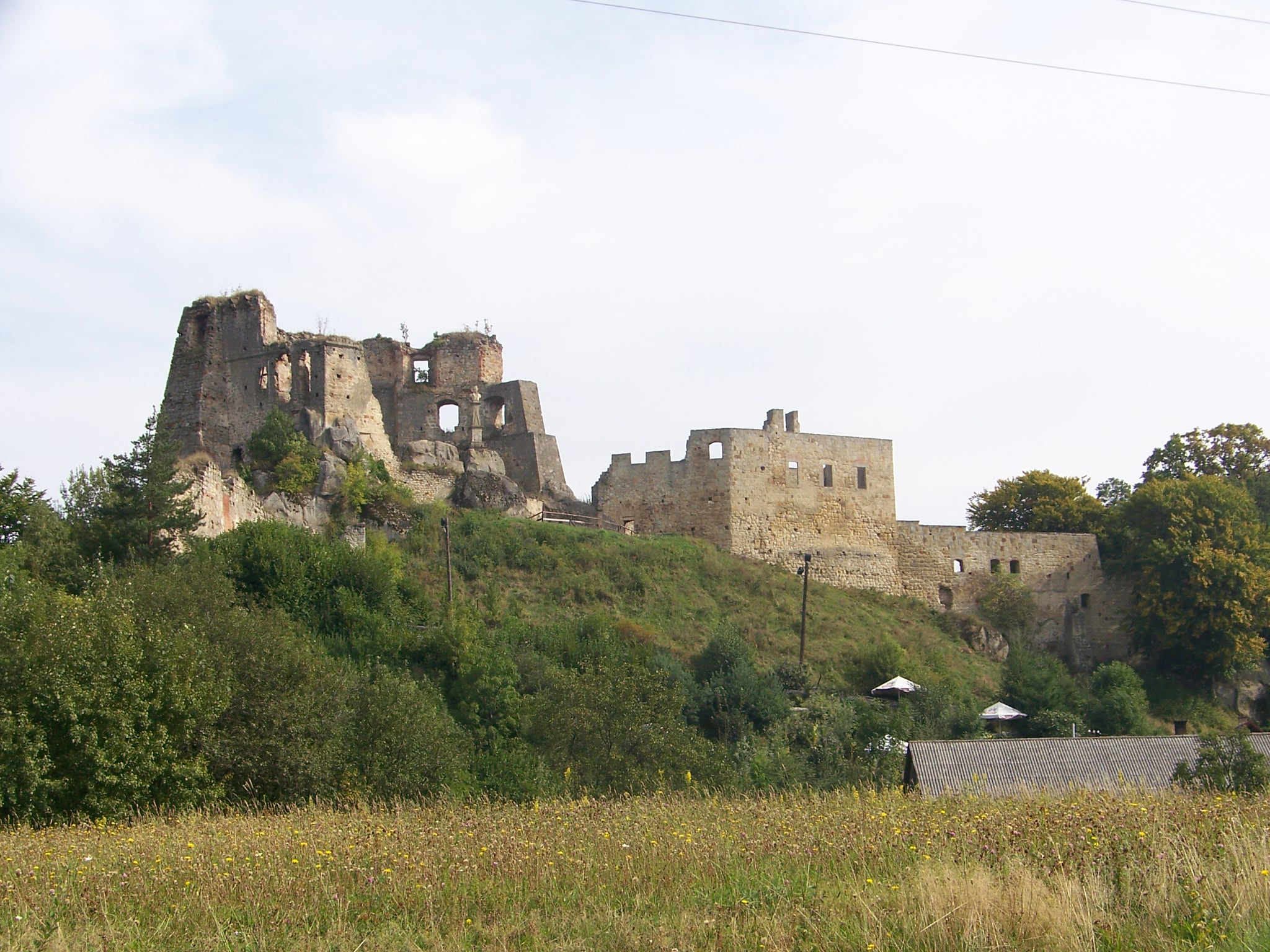
Castle of Kamieniec (ruin)

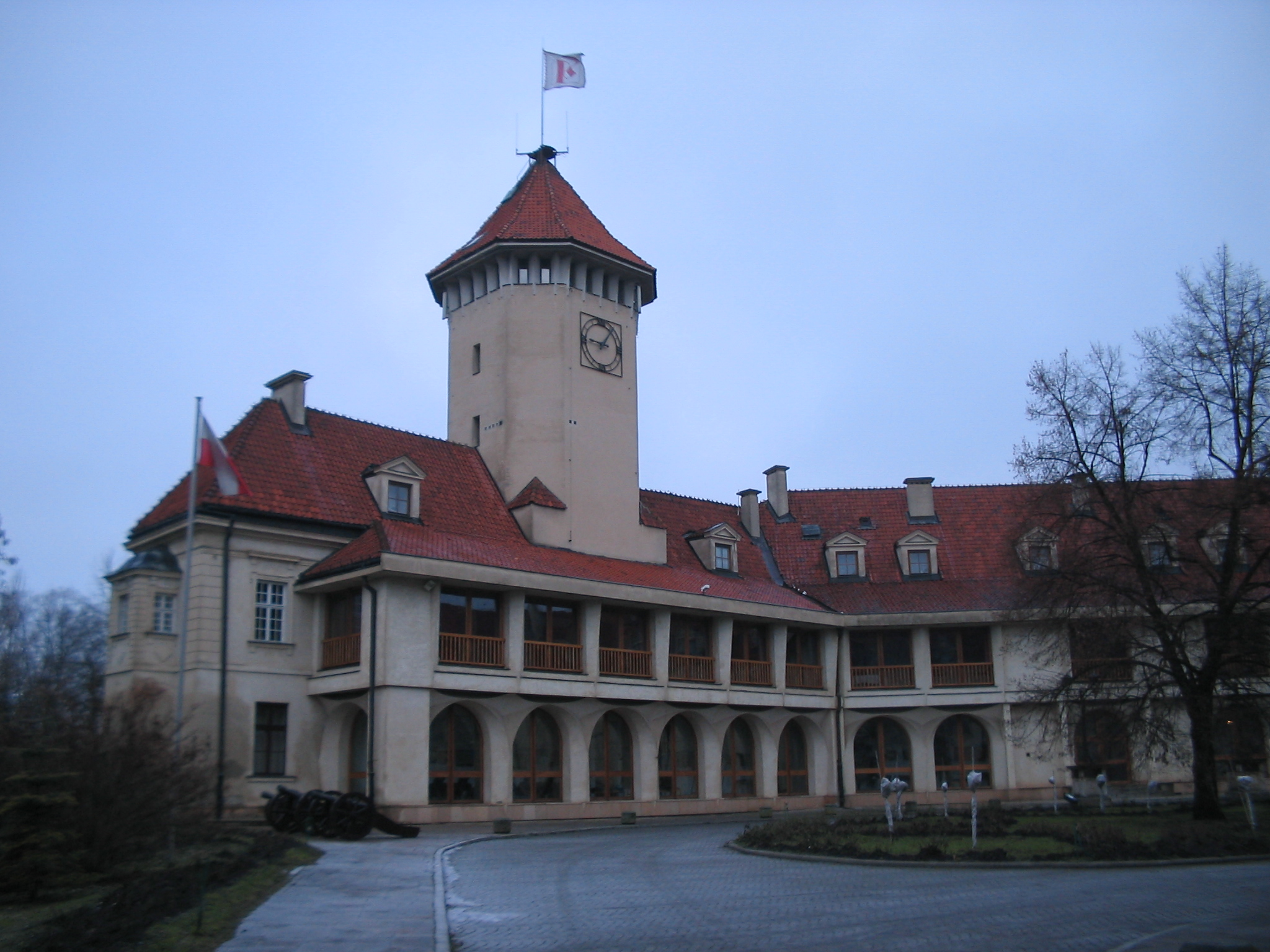
Castle of Pułtusk

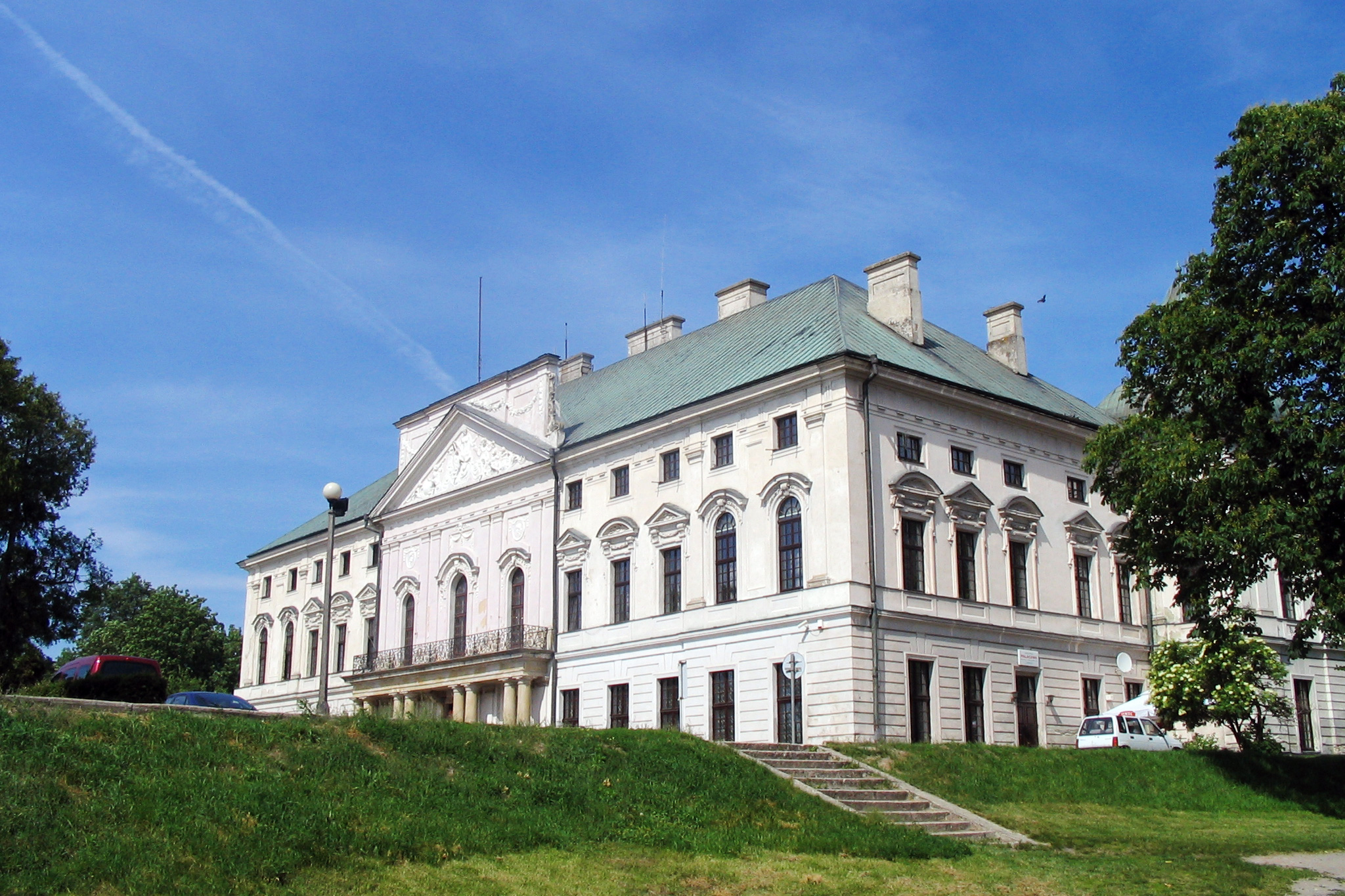
Sanguszko Palace in Lubartów

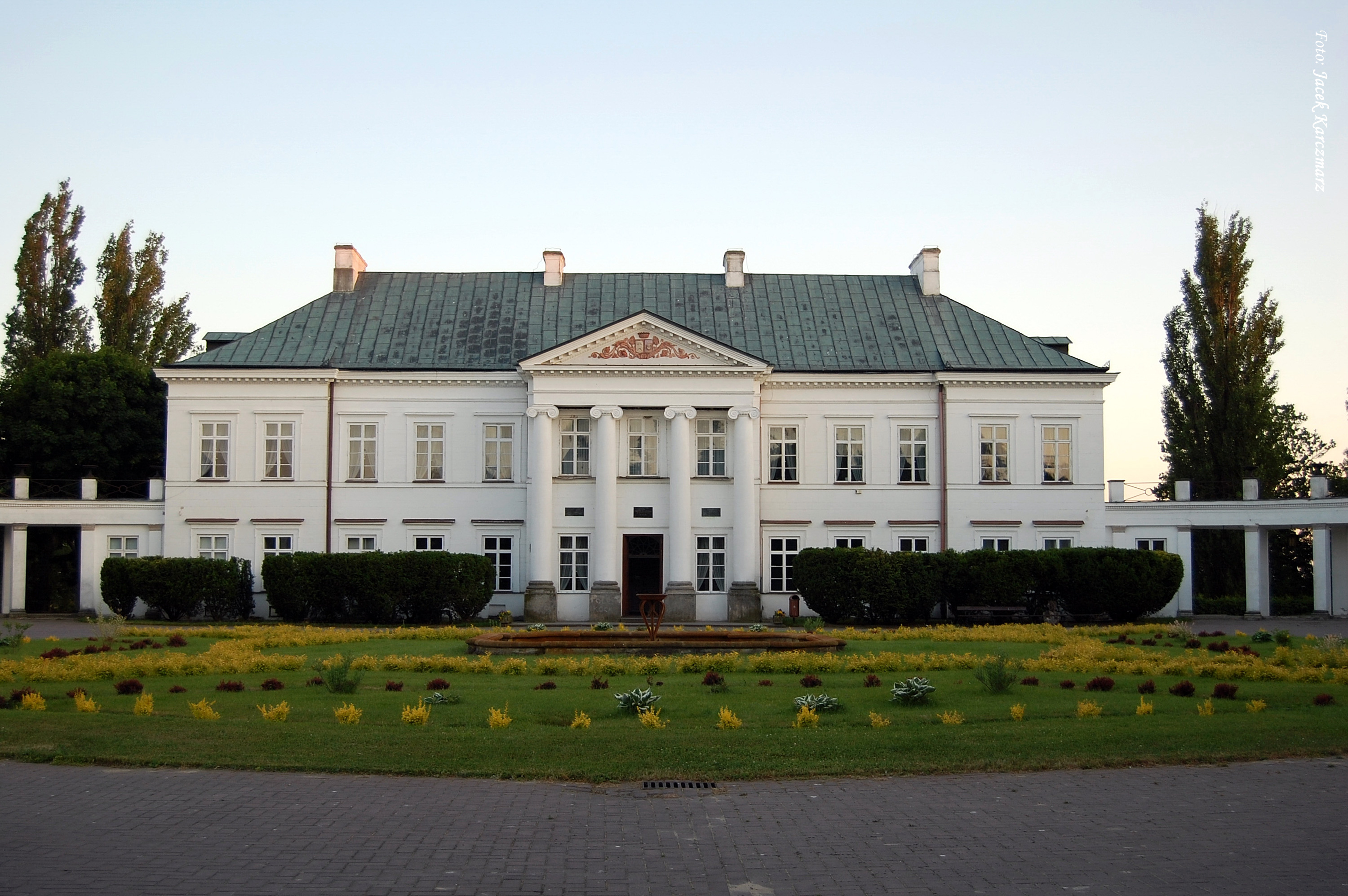
Jabłonowski Palace in Kock

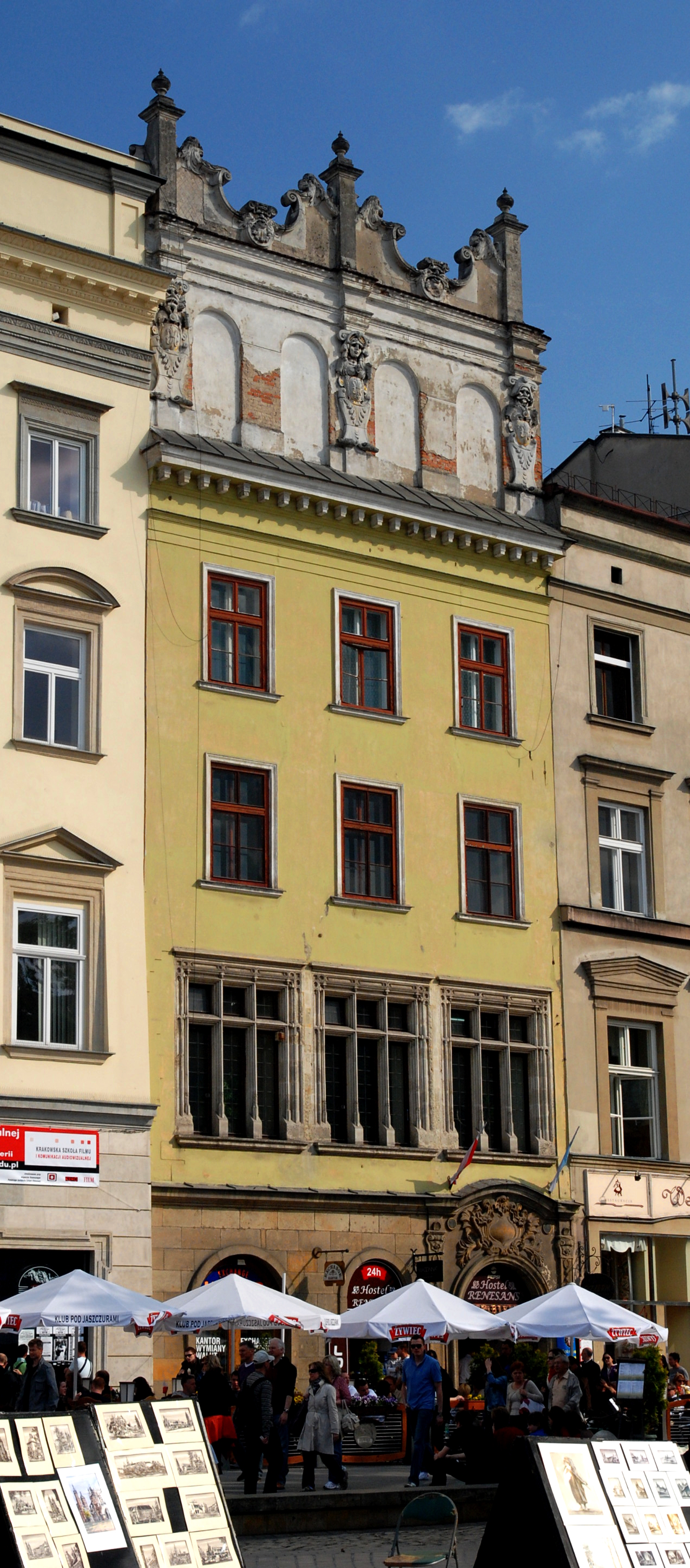
Tenement House Bonerowska in Kraków

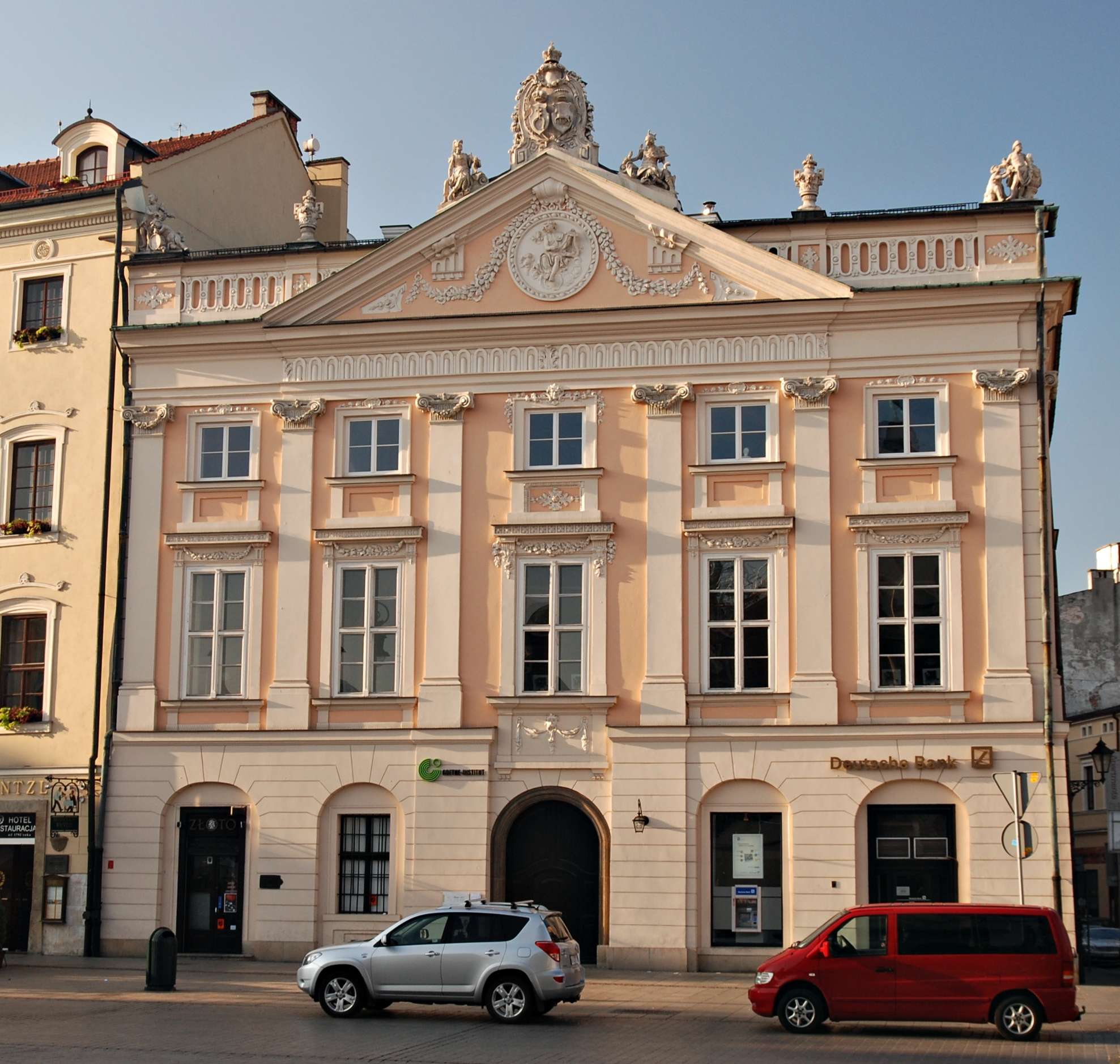
Zbarski Palace in Kraków

== Bibliography ==
- "Фирлей" . Brockhaus and Efron Encyclopedic Dictionary (in Russian). 1906.
- Andrzej Przybyszewski, Firlejowie herbu Lewart, Radomyśl Wielki, 2008, ISBN 978-83-927999-0-0
- Andrzej Szymanek, Mecenat kulturalny Firlejów; Firlejowie w tradycji lokalnej Lubelszczyzny, Janowiec : TPJ, 2001, ISBN 8391362728
