= Mikołaj Firlej =

Mikołaj Firlej may refer to several members of the Firlej family:

- Mikołaj Firlej (died 1526), hetman, voiode of Sandomierz (wojewoda sandomierski)
- Mikołaj Firlej (d. 1588), voivode of Lublin (wojewoda lubelski)
- Mikołaj Firlej (died 1601), voivode of Kraków (wojewoda krakowski), Grand Marshal of the Crown
- Mikołaj Firlej (1588–1635), voivode of Sandomierz (wojewoda sandomierski)
