= Lubartów =

Town in Lublin Voivodeship, Poland

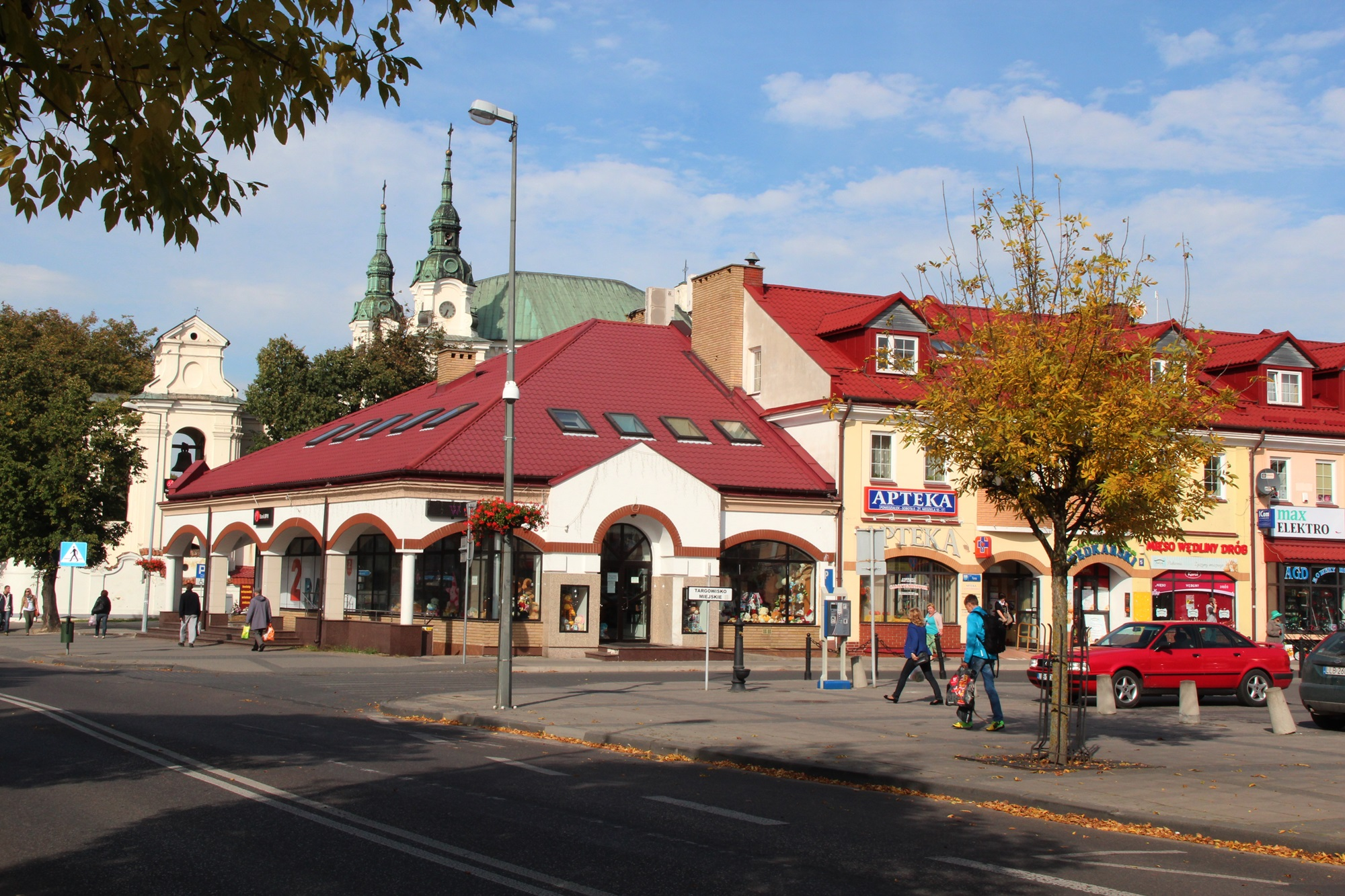
- Old Town Square in Lubartów

- Flag Coat of arms

- Location within Poland
- Coordinates: 51°28′N 22°36′E
- Country: Poland
- Voivodeship: Lublin
- County: Lubartów
- Gmina: Lubartów (urban gmina)
- Established: 1543
- Town rights: 1543
- Founded by: Piotr Firlej

Government
  - Mayor: Krzysztof Paśnik (PSL)

Area
  - Total: 13.91 km^{2} (5.37 sq mi)

Population (2015)
  - Total: 22,369
  - Density: 1,608/km^{2} (4,165/sq mi)
- Time zone: UTC+1 (CET)
  - Summer (DST): UTC+2 (CEST)
- Postal code: 21-100
- Area code: +48 81
- Car plates: LLB
- Website: http://www.lubartow.pl

Lubartów (Polish pronunciation: [luˈbartuf]) is a town in eastern Poland, with 23,000 inhabitants (2004), situated in Lublin Voivodeship. It is the capital of Lubartów County and the Lubartów Commune. Historically it belongs to Lesser Poland.

Lubartów was established in 1543 by Piotr Firlej under a founding order issued by King Sigismund the Old.

The town is located 26 kilometres (16 miles) north of Lublin, on the Wieprz river, on the border between two geographical regions of Poland - Lublin Upland, and South Podlasie Lowland. Near Lubartów, the Kozłówka Landscape Park (Kozłowiecki Park Krajobrazowy) is located. The town is the 10th largest urban center of the voivodeship, and its area is 13.92 square kilometres (5.37 sq mi).

== Name ==
The town's original Polish name was Lewartów (pronounced [lɛ'vartuf]) until 1744, when it was changed to Lubartów. Yiddish language, however, retains the original name Lewartów to this day (but pronounced ['lɛvatof]).

== History ==
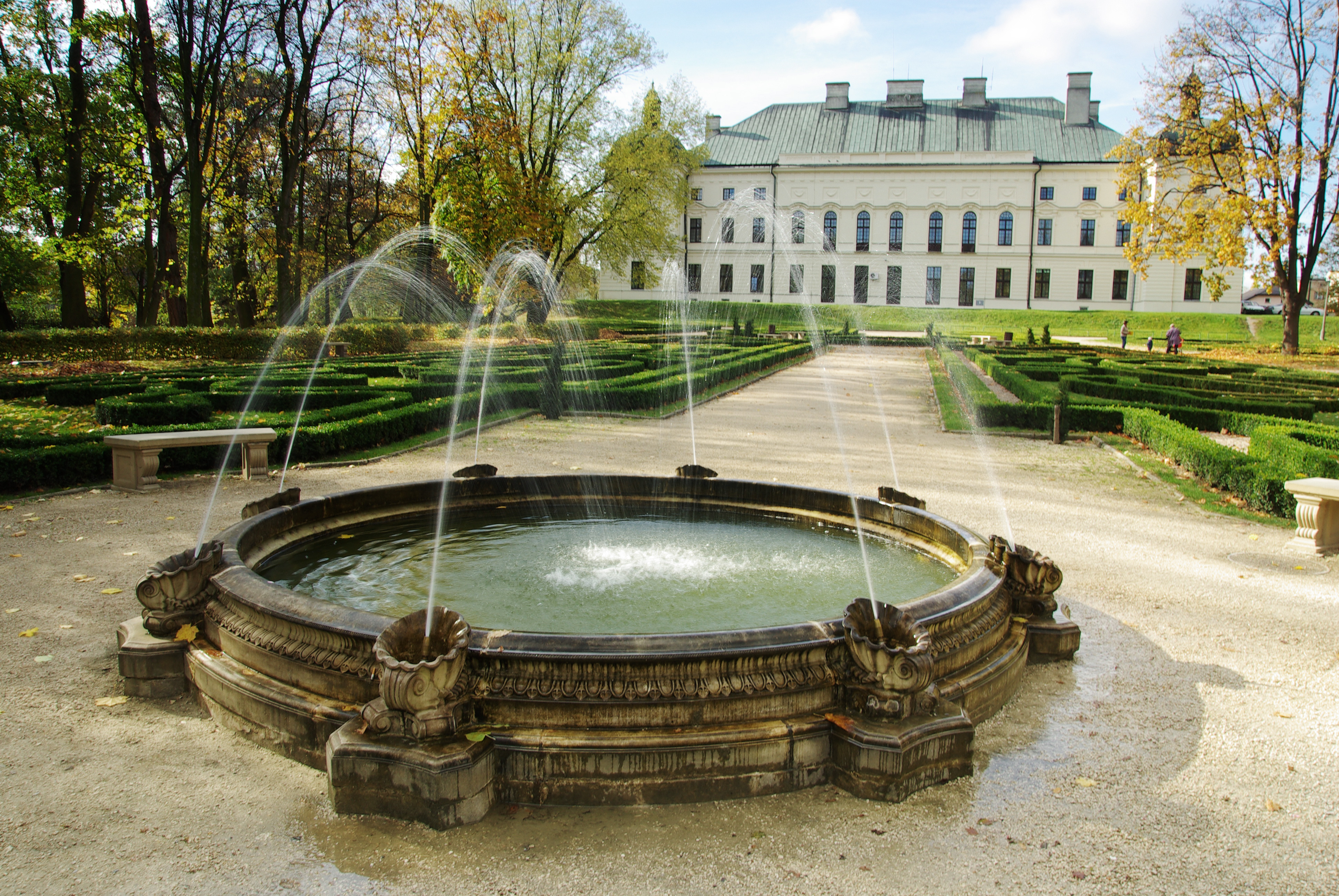
Fountain in the palatial gardens

The history of Lubartów began on 29 May 1543, when King Sigismund the Old allowed local nobleman Piotr Firlej to found a town called Lewartów (the original name comes from Lewart, the coat of arms of the Firlej family). Lubartów was a private town, administratively located in the Lublin Voivodeship in the Lesser Poland Province. The town became famous when it belonged to Mikołaj Firlej, the son of Piotr Firlej. In 1559, Wojciech Calissius founded a Protestant school in the town, which was one of centers of Calvinism in Lesser Poland in the late 16th century. Mikołaj Firlej invited a number of skilled artisans from France, Germany and Holland, as well as cattle breeders. Lewartów frequently changed owners. In the early 18th century it belonged to the Sanguszko family, who rebuilt the palace, built two Baroque churches and tenement houses. Upon request of Paweł Karol Sanguszko, on 21 November 1744, King Augustus III of Poland changed the name of the town to Lubartów (in honor of Lubart - Liubartas, the son of Lithuanian Prince Gediminas; Sanguszko believed that Liubartas was the founder of his family). King Augustus granted a new coat of arms to the town.

The town was annexed by Austria in the Third Partition of Poland in 1795. Following the Austro-Polish War of 1809 it was included in the short-lived Polish Duchy of Warsaw. The 19th century was not lucky for Lubartów, as the town, which from 1815 to 1915 belonged to Russian-controlled Congress Poland, burned several times (1831, 1838, 1846). Two battles between Polish insurgents and Russian troops were fought there during the Polish uprisings of 1830–1831 and 1863–1864. In 1866 it became the seat of a county, and slowly began modernization. By 1912 it had seven manufacturing enterprises, including mills and a brewery, in 1922, glassworks were opened.

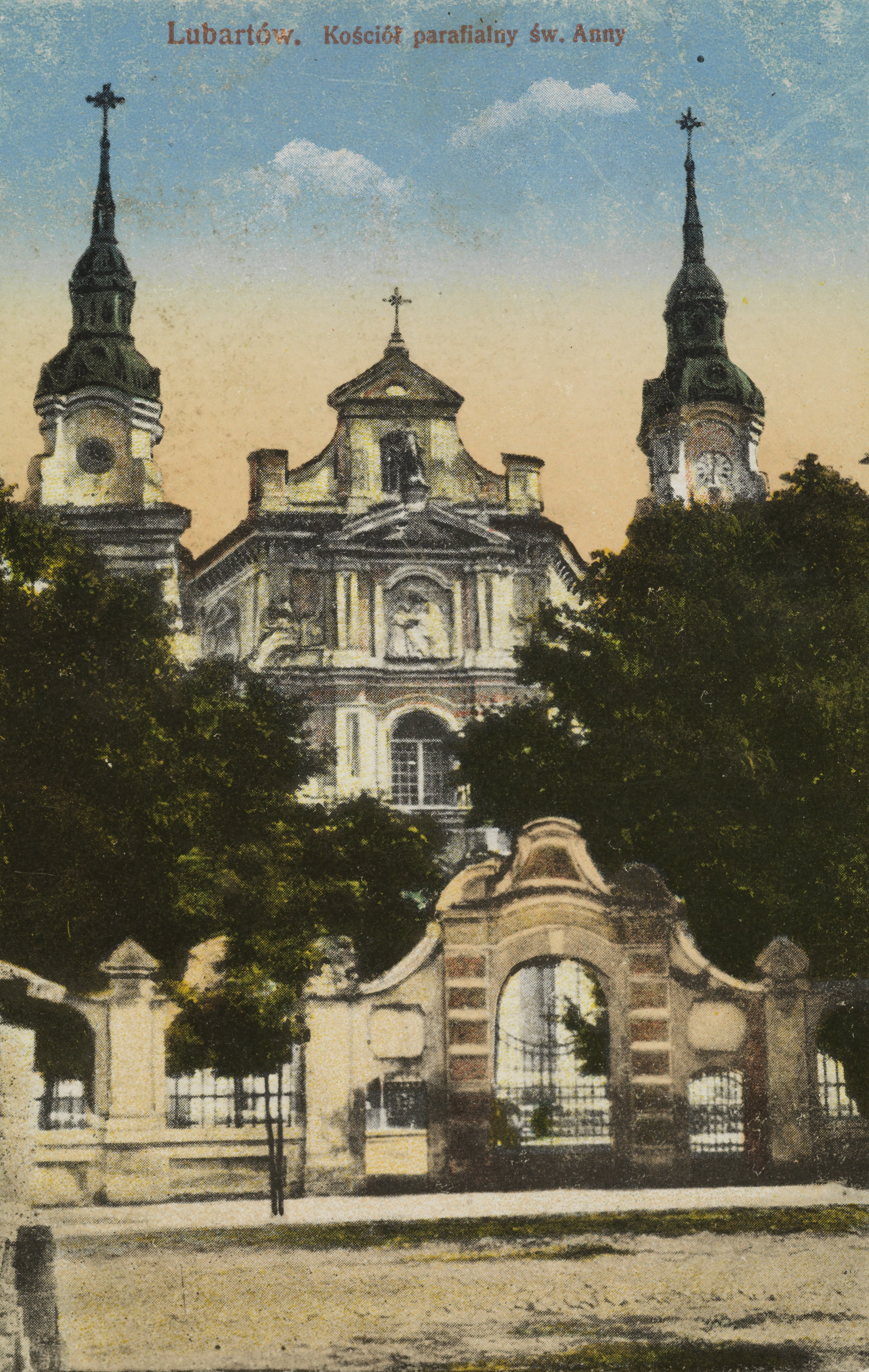
Saint Anne church in 1924

Following the German-Soviet invasion of Poland, which started World War II in September 1939, the town was occupied by Germany. In October 1939, the Germans executed nine Poles, accused of possession of weapons. On 23 December 1939 the German police carried out a massacre of 48 Poles in the town. Tadeusz Illukiewicz, starost of the Lubartów County, was imprisoned in the Lublin Castle in October 1939, and then murdered in Lublin in December 1939 in a massacre of 10 Poles perpetrated as part of the Intelligenzaktion. At least four Poles from Lubartów, including mayor Jan Stanisław Jastrzębski-Ślepowron and two tax officials were murdered by the Russians in the Katyn massacre in April–May 1940. In June 1940, during the AB-Aktion, the Germans carried out mass arrests of around 500 Poles, who were then imprisoned in Lublin, and many of whom were soon deported to the Sachsenhausen and Auschwitz concentration camps. In 1941, the Jews were confined to a ghetto, and in 1942 they were deported to extermination camps and the ghetto was liquidated. The town was liberated by the Polish Home Army in July 1944.

An unusual accumulation of amber deposits has been discovered in areas near Lubartow. A company called Stellarium is already mining these deposits, hailed as "the new amber route. Data from Poland's National Geological Institute in 2019 estimated that amber deposits in the Lubartów area of the Lublin region may be up to 25 times larger than those in the northern Pomerania region, 1,500 tons vs. 59 tons. And the region's amber deposits are available not as deep as in the north of the country, making mining more economically viable.

== Jews of Lubartów ==
From its foundation until World War II, the town also had a large Jewish community, numbering nearly half of the population in the 1930s. However nearly the entire community was destroyed during the Holocaust. Lubartów was a bilingual town for most of its history, Polish and Yiddish being both widely used. Polish was used among non-Jews as well as for most communication between Jewish and non-Jewish townspeople, while Yiddish was the everyday language of the town's Jewish inhabitants.

== Points of interest ==
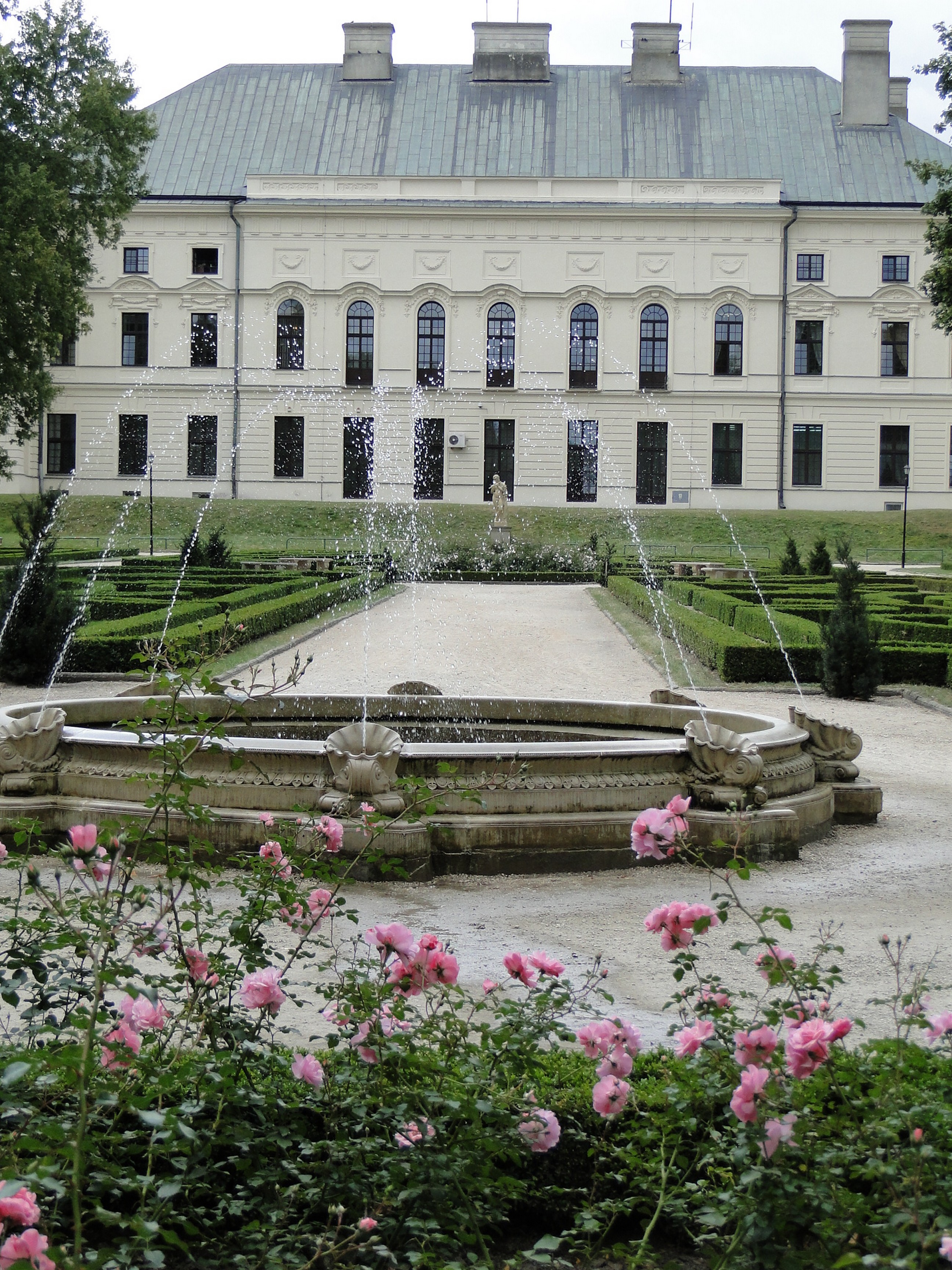
Sanguszko Palace, seat of the Lubartów County

Among most interesting points of interest is the Sanguszko Palace (18th century). The original palace was built in the mid-16th century as a fortified residence by Piotr Firlej II. In 1693 architect Tylman van Gameren created a plan for rebuilding of the palace for Józef Karol Lubomirski, and in 1705, the complex was partially burned during the Great Northern War. The palace was rebuilt from the funds of Paweł Karol Sanguszko, and burned again in 1933. Rebuilt in 1950–1970, it now is home to starosta of Lubartów County. Another interesting object are: Baroque St. Anne Basilica (1733-1738), and the monastery of Order of Friars Minor Capuchin with the St. Lawrence Church (1737-1741). There is also a museum (Muzeum Ziemi Lubartowskiej), located in a historic manor house.

== Transport ==
Lubartów is a road hub, where National road 19 (Rzeszów–Białystok) meets Voivodeship road 815. Furthermore, Lubartów is located along the rail line No. 30 (Łuków–Lublin).

== Sports ==
The local football club is Lewart Lubartów, founded in 1923. It competes in the lower leagues.

== Cuisine ==
Among the protected traditional local foods, as designated by the Ministry of Agriculture and Rural Development of Poland, are:

- Buckwheat honey, typical to the Lublin Region including Lubartów. Rich in magnesium, iron, vitamin C and protein, it is used to treat a wide range of diseases.
- Makowiec lubartowski, a local type of poppy seed roll.
- Pasztecik z grzybami, a baked puff pastry stuffed with mushrooms, onions, olive oil and spices, sprinkled with cheese. It is a local dish of Lubartów and nearby Ostrów Lubelski.

== International relations ==
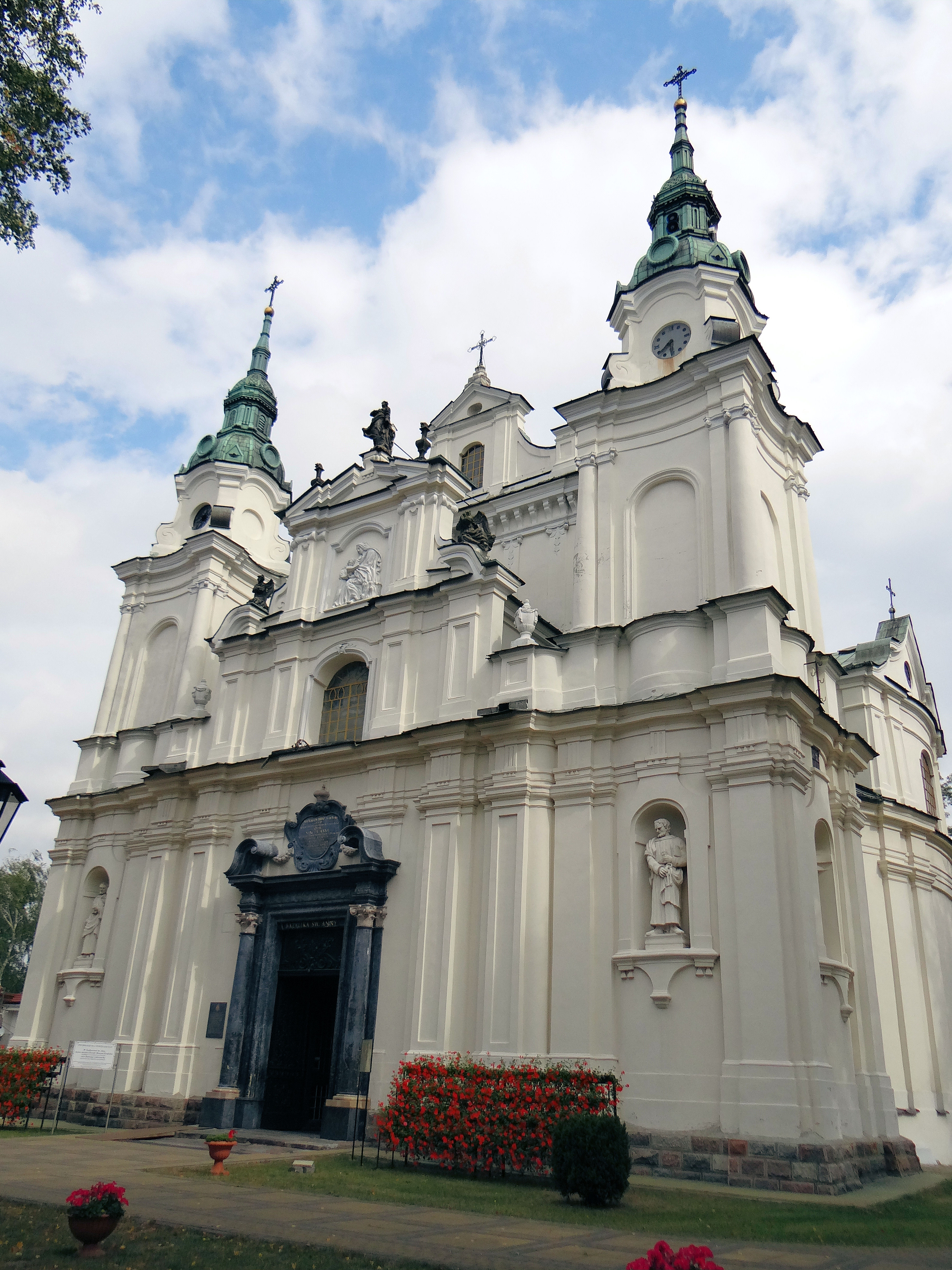
Saint Anne Church

=== Twin towns — Sister cities ===
Lubartów is twinned with:

- Hajdudorog, Hungary
- Raseiniai, Lithuania
- Taksony, Hungary

== Notable people ==
- Jan Kochanowski (1530–1584), Polish Renaissance poet
- Janusz Aleksander Sanguszko (1712–1775), Polish magnate, general and official
- Maciej Topolski (1767–1812), Polish painter
- Bolesław Prus (1847–1912), Polish novelist
- Ewa Pisiewicz (born 1962), retired Polish Olympic sprinter
- Rafał Patyra (born 1974), Polish sport journalist
