= Lublin Voivodeship (1474–1795) =

Former administrative division of the Kingdom of Poland

Coordinates: 51°13′22″N 22°54′10″E

Lublin Voivodeship Województwo Lubelskie Palatinatus Lublinensis
- Voivodeship of Poland
- 1474–1795
- Coat of arms

- Lublin Voivodeship in the Polish–Lithuanian Commonwealth in 1635
- Capital: Lublin
- Area
- 10,230 km^{2} (3,950 sq mi)
- History
  - Established: 1474
  - Third partition: 24 October 1795
- Political subdivisions: counties: 3
Preceded by	Succeeded by
Sandomierz Voivodeship	New Galicia
- Today part of: Poland

Lublin Voivodeship (Polish: Województwo Lubelskie; Latin: Palatinatus Lublinensis) was an administrative region of the Kingdom of Poland created in 1474 out of three eastern counties of Sandomierz Voivodeship and lasting until the Partitions of Poland in 1795. Together with Sandomierz Voivodeship and Kraków Voivodeship, it was part of historic Lesser Poland and the Lesser Poland Province. Lublin Voivodeship had two senators in the Senate of the Kingdom of Poland: the Voivode and the Castellan of Lublin. Local sejmiks took place in Lublin.

== History ==
The entire area of the voivodeship was located east of the Vistula river, and its boundaries did not change from the time of its creation (1474), until its dissolution by Austrian authorities in 1795, after the third and final partition of Poland. After 1795, the entire Lublin Voivodeship became part of Austrian province of West Galicia. After the Polish victory in the Austro-Polish War of 1809, the former Lublin Voivodeship was regained by Poles and included within the short-lived Duchy of Warsaw. After the duchy's dissolution, since 1815, it was part of the Russian-controlled Congress Kingdom. Among major towns of contemporary Poland, which belonged to the voivodeship are Biłgoraj, Kraśnik, Lubartów, Leczna, Opole Lubelskie, Łuków, Parczew, Puławy, Radzyń Podlaski, Siedlce, and Świdnik.

Zygmunt Gloger in his book Historical Geography of the Lands of Old Poland gives a detailed description of Lublin Voivodeship together with the Land of Łuków:

The fact that the area between the Vistula and the Bug River belonged to Poland during the reign of Bolesław Chrobry, is confirmed by chronicles from the times of the Piast dynasty. Jan Długosz writes that the Land of Lublin was densely inhabited by farmers and other settlers, but its population was decimated in 1244, during a raid carried out by the Lithuanians, the Old Prussians, and the Yotvingians, after which it turned into a desert (...)

First castellans of Lublin were mentioned in 1230. They resided in a defensive castle, and this land was part of the Duchy of Sandomierz (...) King Casimir IV Jagiellon, aware of the fact that Sandomierz Voivodeship was too large, separated parts of it located behind the Vistula and the San, creating Lublin Voivodeship. This was confirmed by the Sejm in Piotrków Trybunalski in 1474. First voivode of Lublin was Dobieslaw Kmita of Wiśnicz (...)

Total area of the voivodeship was 200 sq. miles, out of which Lublin County took 105 sq. miles, Urzedow County approximately 60 sq. miles, and the Land of Łuków – 35 sq. miles. In the 16th century, it had 34 towns, 663 villages and 82 Roman Catholic parishes (...) The voivodeship had two senators, which were the Voivode and the Castellan of Lublin. The sejmiks took place in Lublin, where six deputies were elected to the Sejm of the Polish–Lithuanian Commonwealth, and two deputies to the Lesser Poland Tribunal. Local pospolite ruszenie met near Lublin, and the voivodeship several starostwos, located in Lublin, Łuków, Urzedow, Parczew, Kazimierz Dolny, Wawolnica, Kakolewnica, Zbuczyn and others (...)

Of the three parts of Lesser Poland proper, Lublin Voivodeship was conveniently located by three navigable rivers – the Vistula, the San, and the Wieprz. It also had fertile soil, and a number of historical monuments.

== Seat and administrative division ==
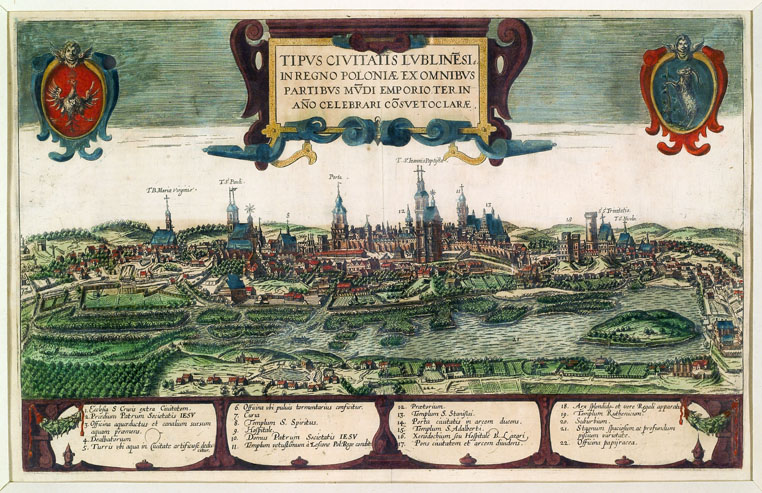
Lublin, capital of the voivodeship, in the 17th century

Voivodeship Governor (Wojewoda) seat:

- Lublin

Administrative division:

- Lublin County (Powiat Lubelski), Lublin
- Urzędów County (Powiat Urzędowski), Urzędów
- Łuków County (Powiat Łukowski, also called the Land of Łuków), Łuków

Main Lublin Voivodes:

Voivode	Years in office	Comments
Dobiesław Kmita	1474-1478	
Stanisław Wątróbka	1478-1478	
Jan Felix Tarnowski	1480-1484	
Dobiesław Kurozwęcki	1484-1494	
Mikołaj of Ostrów	1494-1499	
Jan Feliks Szram Tarnowski	1499-1501	son of Jan Felix Tarnowski, (before 1494)
Mikołaj Kurozwęcki	1502-1507	brother of Dobiesław Kurozwęcki
Mikołaj Firlej	1507-1514	
Andrzej Tęczyński	1515-1519	
Jan Oleśnicki	1520-1537	
Piotr Firlej	1537-1545	
Andrzej Tęczyński	1545-1561	nephew of the first Andrzej Tęczyński
Jan Firlej	1561-1563	son of Piotr Firlej
Mikołaj Maciejowski	1563-1574	
Jan Tarło (1527–1587)	from 1574	
Marek Sobieski	from 1597	
Aleksander Piotr Tarło	1631–1649	
Marcin Zamoyski	from 1682	
Jan Tarło (1684–1750)	from 1719	
Tomasz Antoni Zamoyski	from 1744	
Antoni Lubomirski	from 1778	

Neighboring voivodeships:

- Masovian Voivodeship
- Brest Litovsk Voivodeship
- Chełm Voivodeship
- Bełz Voivodeship
- Ruthenian Voivodeship
- Sandomierz Voivodeship

== Sources ==
- Lublin Voivodeship with Łuków Land by Zygmunt Gloger
- Central European Superpower, Henryk Litwin, BUM Magazine, October 2016.
