= Włodowice Palace =

Włodowice Castle
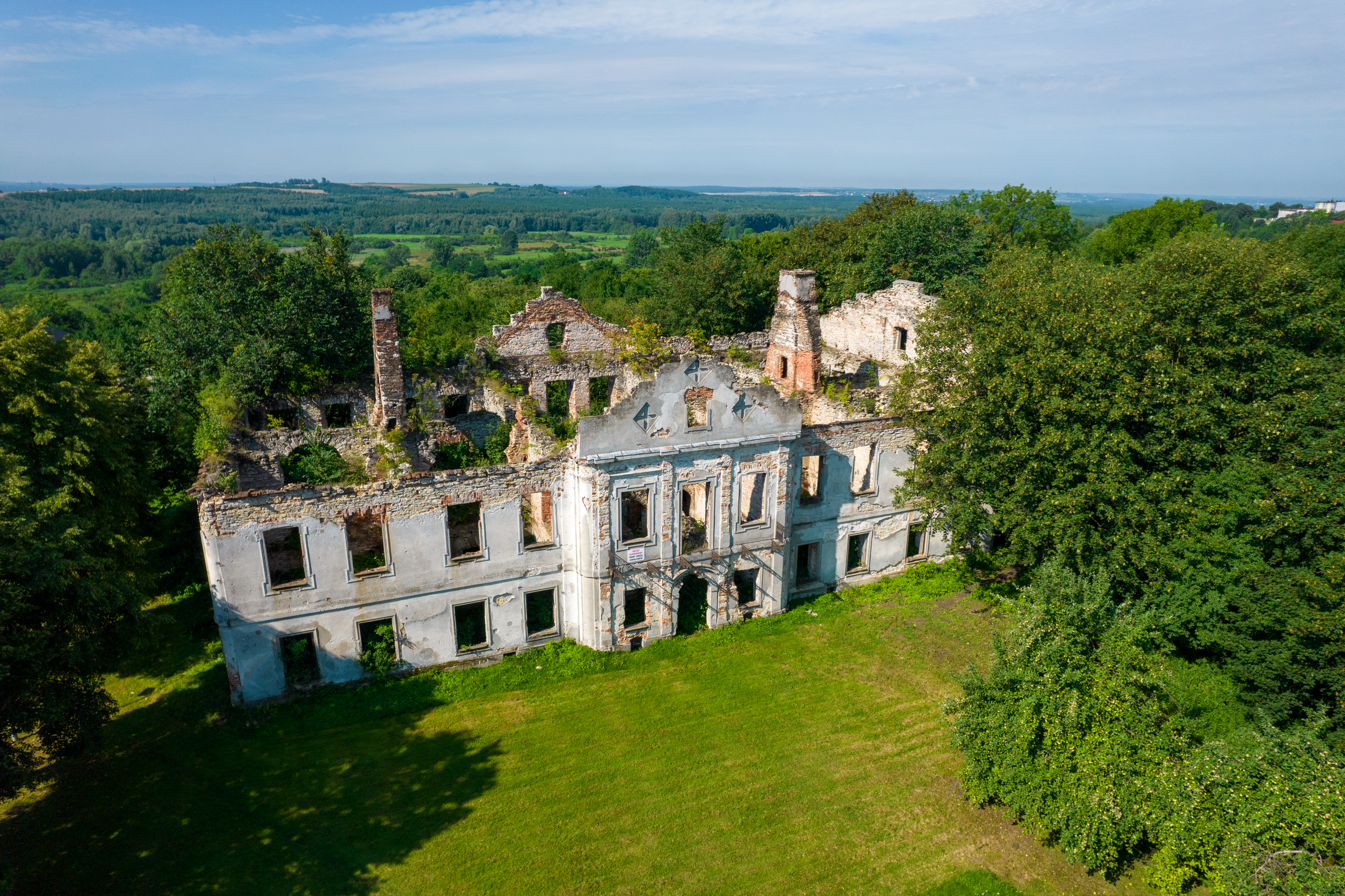
- Ruins of the Włodowice palace

- Location within Poland

General information
- Type: Palace
- Architectural style: Baroque
- Location: Włodowice, Poland
- Coordinates: 50°32′59″N 19°27′17″E
- Construction started: 1669
- Completed: 1681

Włodowice Palace is a ruined Baroque palace situated in Włodowice, Poland.

== History ==
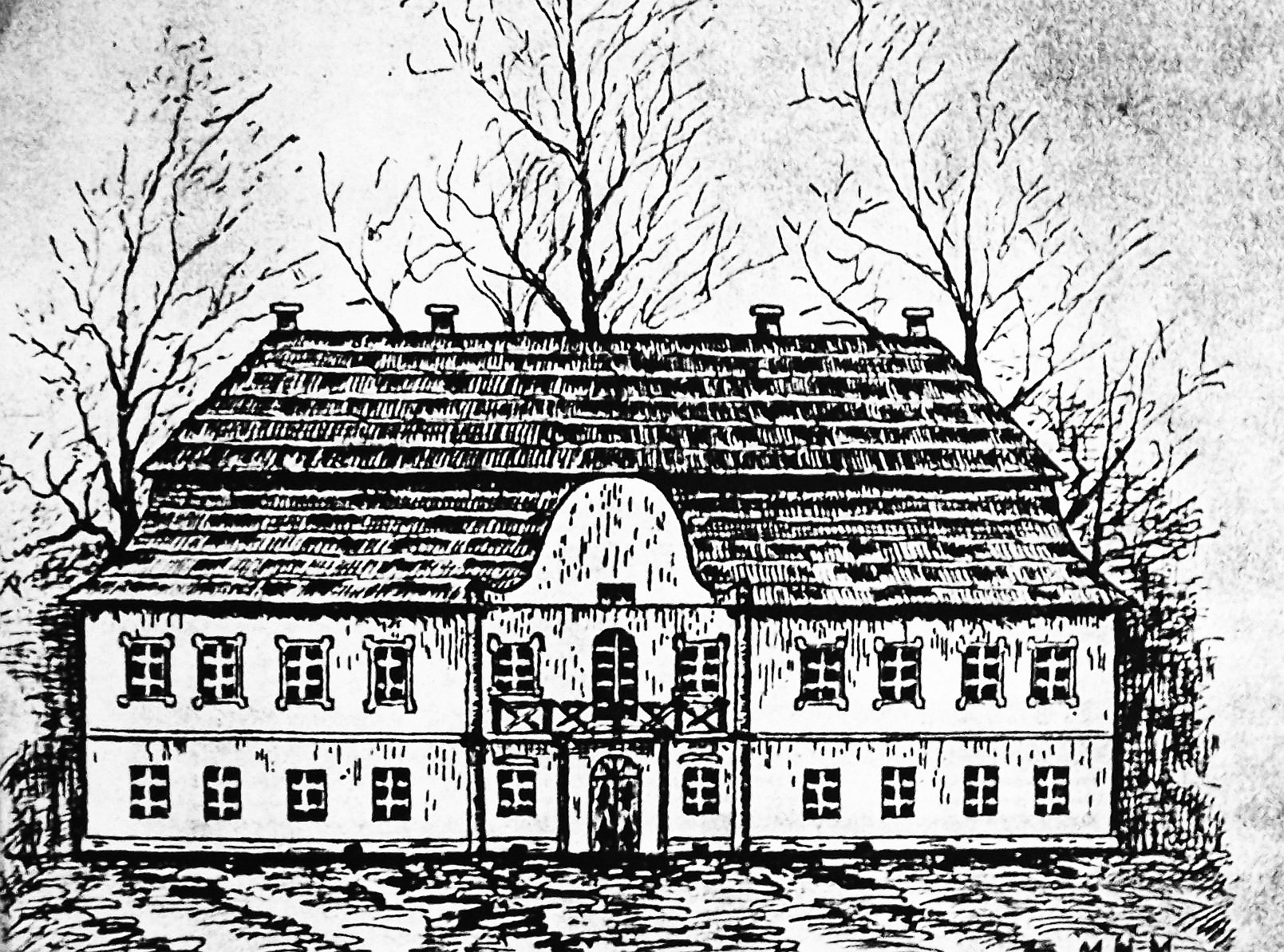
Włodowice palace in 1850

It was built on the spot of a wooden manor owned by the Firlej family. The first building was destroyed during the Polish-Swedish war in 1655-1660. The brick and stone palace was founded by the castellan of Kraków, Stanisław Warszycki at the end of 17th century (between 1669 and 1681). It was a two-storey baroque building with basements and an attic, covered with a mansard roof. It can be seen as a representation of an entre cour et jardin type of manor. In front of the palace there used to be a court with the entrance gate and behind the building there was a garden situated on the slope of the hill. In the 18th century the palace was owned by the Męciński family who redecorated the insides in classicist style. In the 1850s the new owners of the palace were the Poleski family. Michał Poleski, scientist and insurgent of the January Uprising in 1863, created a private agronomic school that was located on the second storey of the palace. One of the chambers was changed into a chemistry and physics laboratory, another one contained a library. The school existed here between 1870 and 1880. Probably around the turn of the 20th century the palace was rebuilt in a neogothic style. The last owner of the palace was Countess Maria Elwira O’Rourke, from a Polish noble family of Irish origin. She left Włodowice probably in 1927 or 1928, selling the palace to a local family. The present condition of the palace is a result of two fires that occurred in 1935 and 1956, along with negligent ownership.

== Bibliography ==
- Górski U. J., Zamek ogrodzieniecki w Podzamczu i okolice, Prodrym, Sosnowiec 1993.
- Katalog zabytków sztuki w Polsce t. 6: Województwo katowickie, z. 15: Powiat zawierciański, red. K. Dżułyńska, A. M. Olszewski, Instytut Sztuki PAN – Wojewódzki Konserwator Zabytków, Warszawa – Katowice 1962.
