= Włodowice, Silesian Voivodeship =

Włodowice
- Town
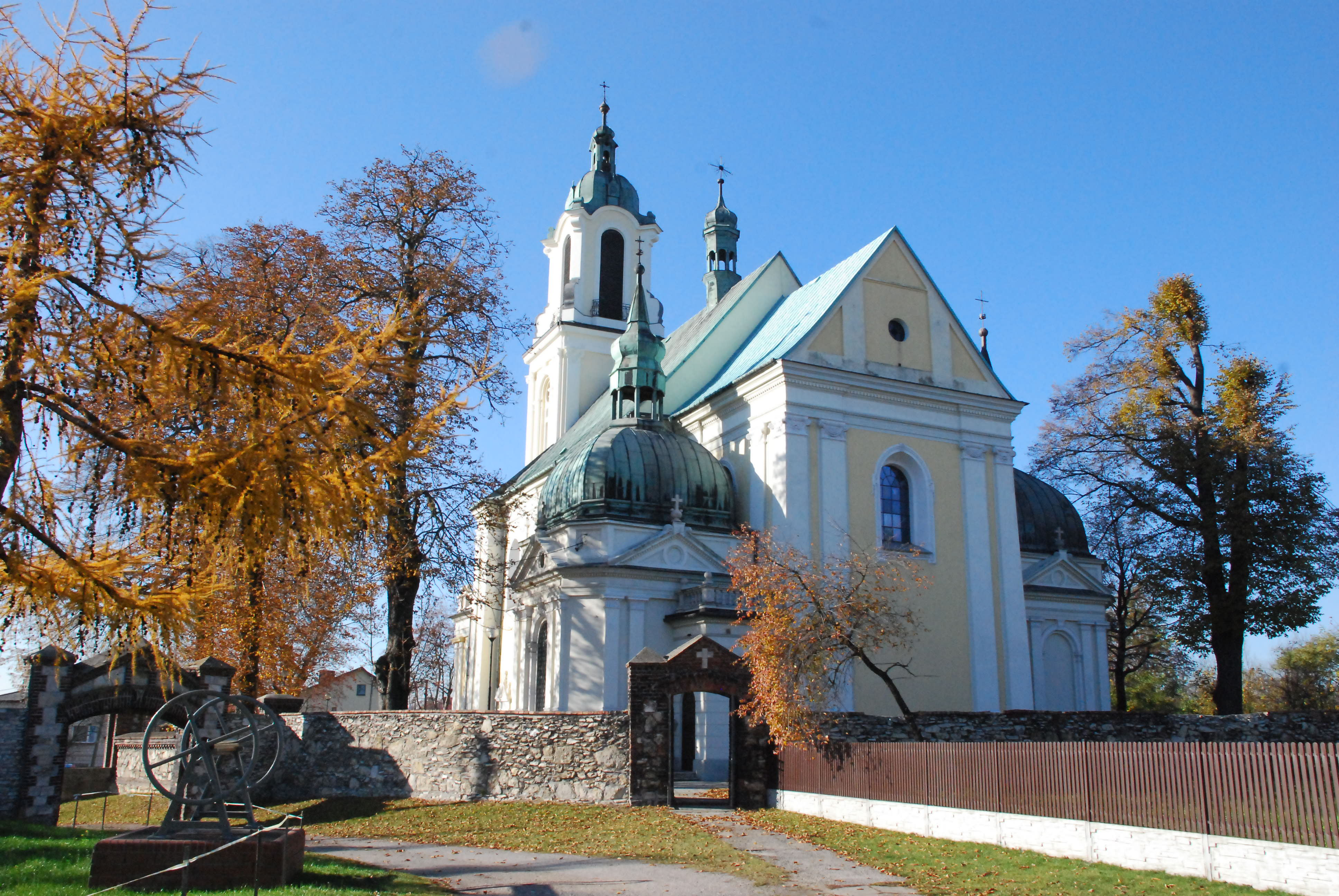
- Church of Saint Bartholomew

- Coat of arms

- Location within Poland
- Coordinates: 50°33′18″N 19°26′51″E
- Country: Poland
- Voivodeship: Silesian
- County: Zawiercie
- Gmina: Włodowice

Population
  - Total: 1,200
- Time zone: UTC+1 (CET)
  - Summer (DST): UTC+2 (CEST)
- Vehicle registration: SZA

Włodowice [vwɔdɔˈvit͡sɛ] (Yiddish: ולודובייץ, romanized: Vlodovietz) is a town in Zawiercie County, Silesian Voivodeship, in southern Poland. It is the seat of the gmina (administrative district) called Gmina Włodowice. The town has a population of 5,700.

It is best known for its centre. The main road leading through Włodowice is Żarecka Street. The town has a Baroque church of St. Bartholomew and ruins of the Baroque Włodowice Palace. Włodowice is located in the middle of the Jura Krakowsko-Częstochowska region, best known for its limestone rocks, such as those of the nearby village of Rzędkowice, carved on the seafloor millions of years ago.

Włodowice has a long and rich history. Even though the town now lies in Silesian Voivodeship, it belongs to historical Lesser Poland, and was a town from mid-14th century to 1870.

== Name ==
First mentioned as Wlodowycze, in a document of Bishop of Kraków Iwo Odrowąż (1220). In the 1470s, Jan Długosz spelled the name Wlodowicze and Wlodowycza, while during World War II, the village was Germanized into Woldenstein.

The name probably comes from old Polish given name Wlodowuj.

== History ==
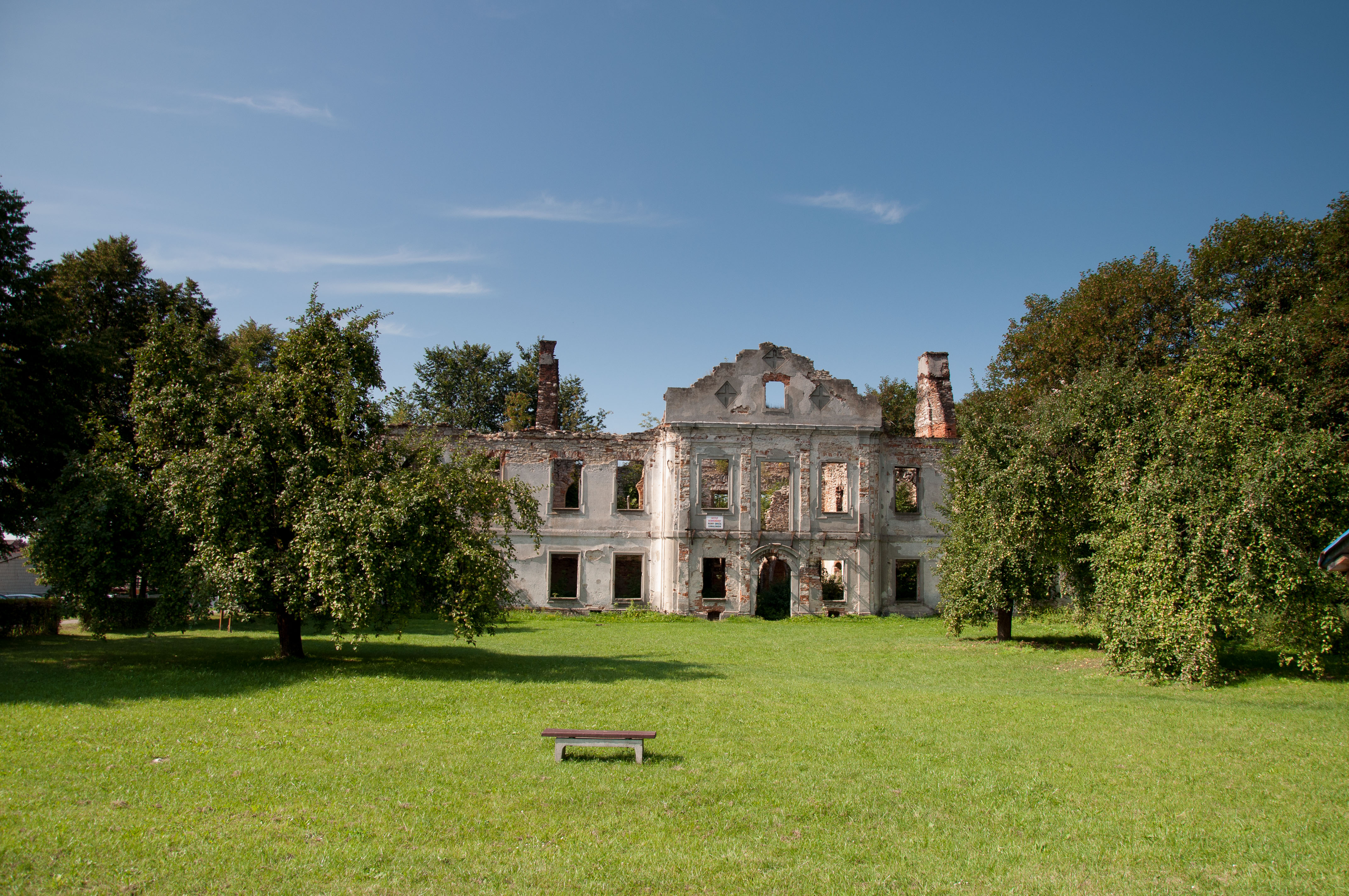
Włodowice Palace ruins and park

Włodowice lies in Polish Jura, near the border between two historic provinces of Poland, Lesser Poland and Silesia. In tribal times, Slavic pagan ceremonies took place on a nearby hill, Góra Głowienna. In 1220, Bishop of Kraków Iwo Odrowąż named Wlodowycze as one of several villages, which had to send payments to the monastery at nearby Mstów. In 1241, Włodowice was burned during the Mongol invasion of Poland, after which local residents rebuilt the village. In early 14th century, a parish church was established there, and in 1327, Włodowice became property of King Władysław I Łokietek. Probably some time in the first half of the 14th century, Włodowice received its town charter, and in 1386, it was handed over to a local noble family. As a private town it was at various times owned by the Salomon, Włodek, Pilecki, Boner and Firlej families. Administratively it was located in the Lelów County, Kraków Voivodeship, Lesser Poland Province.

In the second half of the 16th century, Włodowice was one of the most important centers of Protestant Reformation in western Lesser Poland. At that time, the town belonged to the Boner family, which supported the movement, turning local parish church into a Calvinist prayer house. After the town passed to the Firlej family, Mikołaj Firlej restored the church to the Catholics in 1594. Włodowice remained a small town, which was completely burned during the catastrophic Swedish invasion of Poland (1655–60). In 1669, it passed from the Firlej family to the Warszycki family. On July 26, 1683, King Jan III Sobieski rested here on his way to the Battle of Vienna, and in early March 1734, King Augustus III of Poland also spent one night at a local palace, on his way from Kraków to Częstochowa.

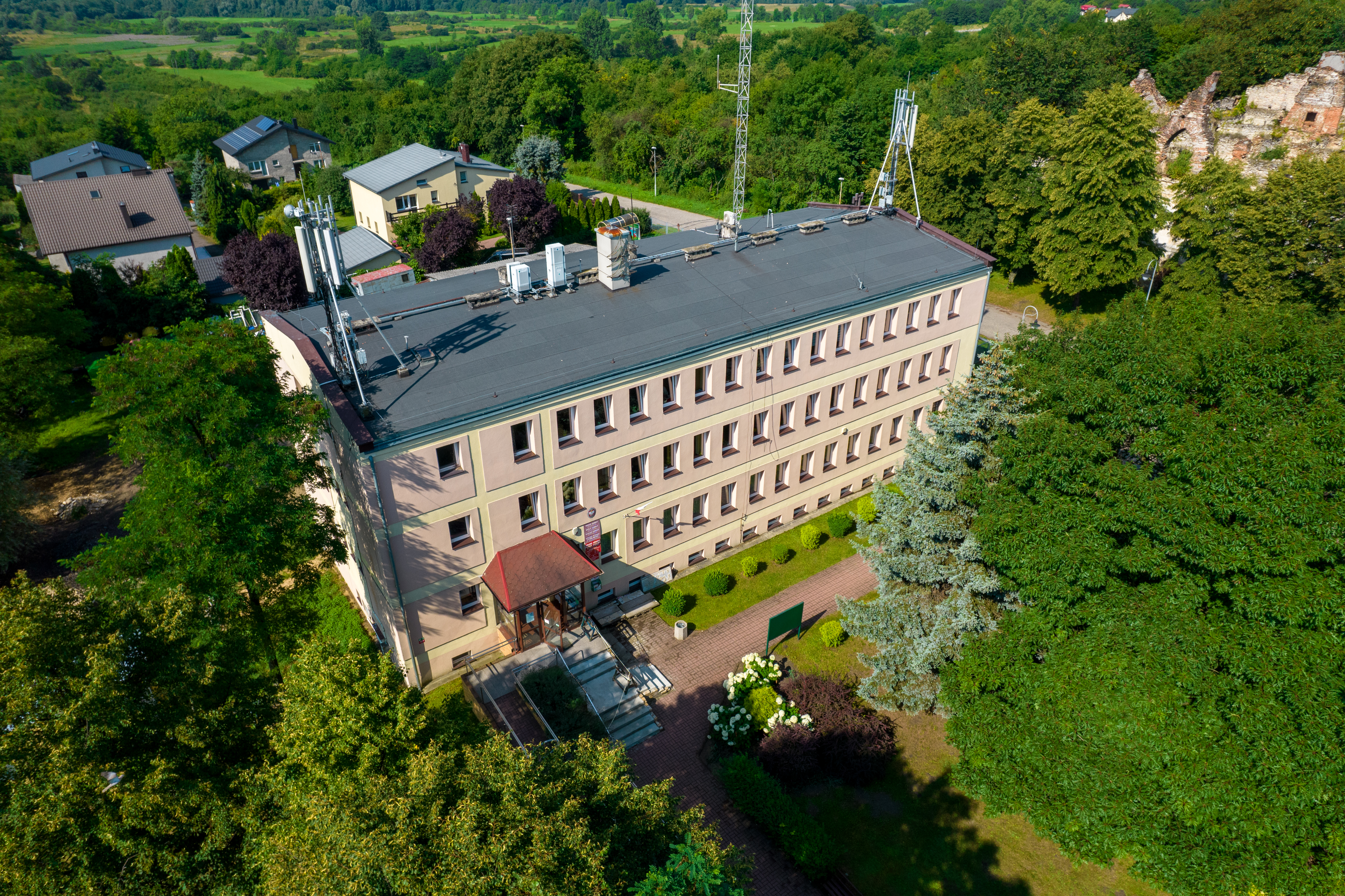
Gmina office

Following the Partitions of Poland, Włodowice briefly belonged to the Kingdom of Prussia. In 1807, the town was regained by Poles and included within the short-lived Duchy of Warsaw. Following the duchy's dissolution, in 1815, it became part of Russian-controlled Congress Poland, in which it remained until World War I. In 1870, as a punishment for the January Uprising, Włodowice lost its town charter.

Following the joint German-Soviet invasion of Poland, which started World War II in 1939, it was occupied by Germany.
