= Mikołaj "Lubelczyk" Kurozwęcki =

Voivode of Lublin
- Reign: 1502–1507
- Predecessor: Jan Feliks Tarnowski
- Successor: Mikołaj Firlej

Castellan of Rozprza and Sieradz
- Reign: 1485–1507
- Predecessor: Dobieslaw Kurozweki
- Successor: Ambroży Pampowski
- Born: before 1485
- Died: 1507
- Spouse: Ewa Rytwiany
- Issue: Adam Kurozwęcki; Hieronim Kurozwęcki; Elżbieta Kurozwęcki
- Dynasty: Poraj
- Father: Krzesław Kurozwęcki
- Mother: Ewa Czarna
- Religion: Catholicism

Mikołaj Kurozwęcki was a Polish noble and voivode of Lublin from 1502 to 1507. His epithets include "Wrzód" and "Lubelczyk." He was also castellan of Rozprza and Sieradz from 1485, along with starost of Sieradz from 1502.

== Early life ==
Mikołaj was the son of the castellan of Lublin Krzesław Kurozwęcki and Ewa Zarna of Gorzyce, who herself was from the House of Sulima. His two brothers, Dobiesław and Stanisław, would reach as much power as he did, with Dobiesław becoming castellan of Rozprza, voivode of Lublin, and voivode of Sandomierz, while Stanisław became Chancellor and Vice-Chancellor of the Crown, among other titles.

== Rule ==
=== Castellan ===
He would become castellan of Rozprza following Dobiesław's death in 1485, along with castellan of Sieradz in the same period. On May 6, 1499, he signed the act that renewed the Polish-Lithuanian union in Kraków, and was a signatory of the Union of Mielnik in 1501.

=== Voivode ===
After becoming voivode of Lublin and starost of Sieradz in 1502, he would also sign the Nihil novi in 1505 at the Sejm in Radom. He also signed the diploma of election of Sigismund I the Old as King of Poland and Grand Duke of Lithuania at the Sejm in Piotrków on December 8, 1506.

== Family ==
With Ewa Rytwiany, the daughter of Jan Rytwiański, Voivode of Kraków he would have two sons, Adam and Hieronim, and a daughter, Elżbieta.
