= Wojciech Calissius =

Polish Unitarian educator, pastor, and writer

Wojciech z Kalisza (Latin Albertus Calissius) was a Polish Unitarian educator, pastor, and writer. He opened the school of Lubartów.
