= Krupski =

Polish noble family

Korczak coat of arms

The Krupski family (Polish: Krupski, Belarusian: Крупскі, Russian: Крупский, Ukrainian: Крупський, Lithuanian: Krupskis) is a Polish noble family. It is also a common surname in modern Poland.

== Origin ==
According to Latin and Polish texts, the original name was "de Krupa". A modern form of the surname appears in 15th-century Polish texts, and in 1534 a Latin text contains the name "Crupsky". In 1550, a Valery Crupski completed his studies at Cracow University.). In 19th-century Belarusian and Russian texts, the name appears as Крупскій (Крупскі) or Крупский. Surnames in the Russian Empire became standardized after the abolition of serfdom in 1861.

Polish Roman Catholic bishop Jan Długosz (1415–1480), in his description of the Korczak coat of arms, identified Krupski with Korczak and the family's ethnic group as the Rusyns. The first known Krupski was diplomat and military commander Jerzy Krupski (1472–1548), who owned estates in Red Ruthenia (present-day Chełm and Krasnystaw Counties of Lublin Voivodeship) and built a fort in 1492.

== Branches ==
Branches of the Krupski family are Korczak, Lewart, Kopacz, Szeliga, and Lew II.

== Estates and churches ==
The family owned the Novoselki Igumen estate in the Minsk Governorate of the Russian Empire and the Kaverlyany estate in the Minsk province of the Grand Duchy of Lithuania until 1742. Ezhi and Christina Krupski founded the Mother of God of Consolation (Order of Friars Minor Capuchin) church in Orchówek, near Włodawa, in 1507. In 1727, Stanislav Krupski financed the construction of the Dominican monastery in Grodno.

== Grand Duchy of Lithuania and Rzeczpospolita ==
1576 seal of Hieronim Krupski, from Volhynia

A Krupski coat of arms was included in the roll of arms (Polish: Herbarz) of the Rzeczpospolita after the 1413 Polish–Lithuanian union. A Zaporozhian Cossacks register dated October 16, 1649 by John II Casimir Vasa and Bohdan Khmelnytsky contains the following:

- Vasil Krupski
- Olexa Krupski
- Leonti Krupski
- Yuri Afanasyevich Krupski
- Timis Krupski
- Jan Krupski
- Michael Krupski

== Russian Empire ==
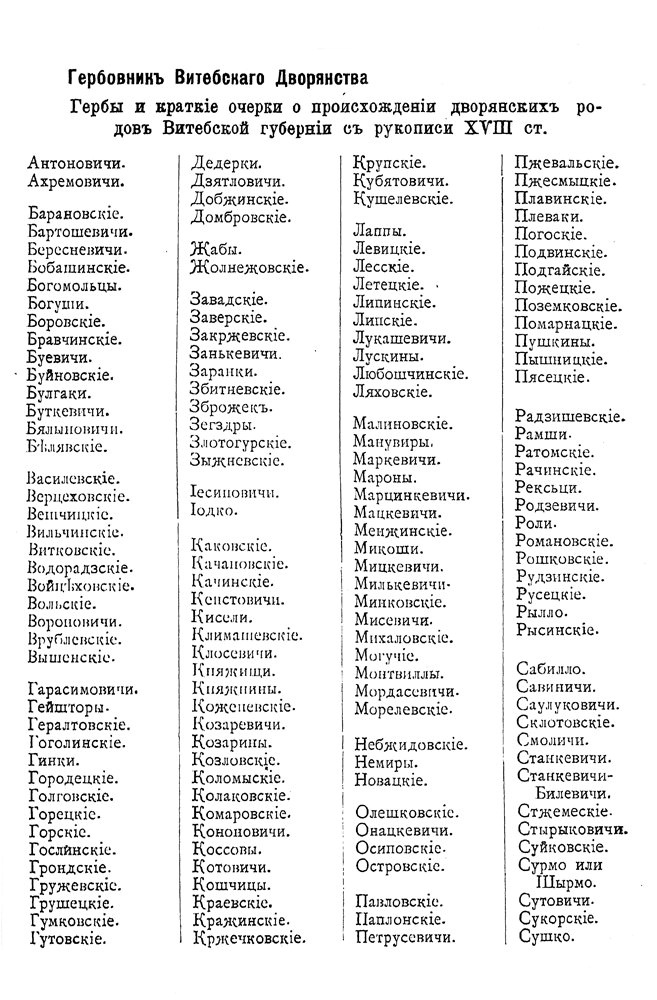
Krupski (Cyrillic spelling) on a 19th-century list of Vitebsk Governorate nobility

Krupski was recognized in the Russian nobility of the Mogilev Governorate on March 16, 1799 and November 12, 1811 as "a noble, ancient family" in a six-volume genealogy book (Russian: Дворянская Родословная Книга). Some family members were not part of the Russian nobility, and paid taxes. Other branches of the family were included in the nobility of the Minsk, Vitebsk, Vilna, Kovno, Volhynia, Podolia and Kiev Governorates. The family were members of the Eastern Catholic Churches and the Roman Catholic and Russian Orthodox Churches. In the Russian Empire, some became Orthodox priests.

== USSR ==
Nadezhda Krupskaya, wife of Vladimir Lenin, was a member of the family. During World War II, 772 family members died in military service; Polish officer Roman Krupski was killed in the Katyn massacre. Ninety family members were repressed by the Communist regime and rehabilitated posthumously.

== Variants ==
The masculine form in Belarusian is Крупскі; the Polish form is Krupski, the Russian form is Крупский and the Ukrainian form Крупський. The feminine suffix is -aya (Krupskaya). In English-speaking countries, the gender difference is not observed.

== Diaspora and toponyms ==
More than 2,000 descendants live primarily in Belarus, Lithuania, Ukraine, Poland and Russia, and a smaller number live in Latvia, Estonia, Great Britain, Ireland, Germany, Sweden, Switzerland, France, Italy, the US (which recorded the first Krupski immigrants from Europe in 1880), Canada, Australia, Moldova, Tajikistan, Uzbekistan, Kazakhstan, Georgia, Israel and South Africa. Krupski is a district in the Minsk Region of Belarus, and Krupski Młyn is a commune and village in Tarnogur County, Silesian Voivodeship, Poland.

== Notable family members ==
- Georgius Crupski (1472 - 1548), senator, voivode of Belz, later Lviv
- Andrey Kurbsky, from the Lewart branch of the family in the Grand Duchy of Lithuania
- Bernardus Krupski - Franciscan monk, Catholic priest, theologian, author of the first book in Polish among Latin-language printing "The Revelation of the Heavenly Mysteries of Saint Bridget" (1698)
- Boniface Urbanovych Krupsky - Russian nobleman, Pole, Roman Catholic, participant in the Polish uprising of 1863 against the Russian Empire
- Nadezhda Krupskaya, Soviet official and wife of Vladimir Lenin
- Janusz Krupski, Polish historian and official
- Dania Krupska, American dancer and choreographer

== See also ==
- Pratulin Martyrs
