= Jan Firlej =

Polish nobleman

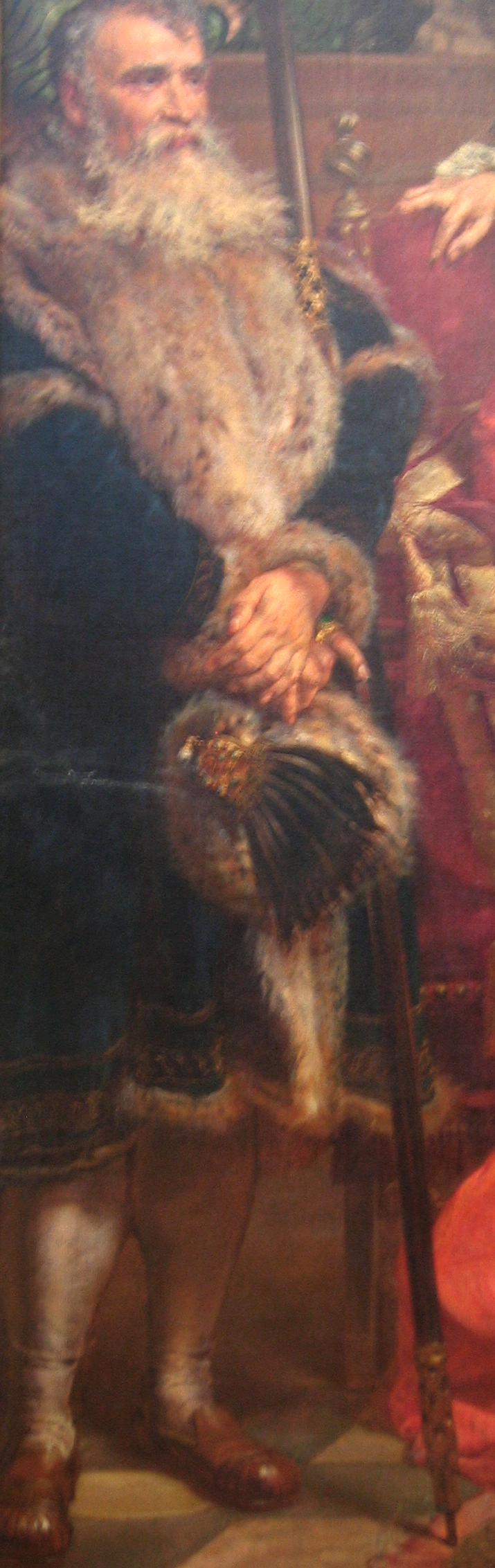

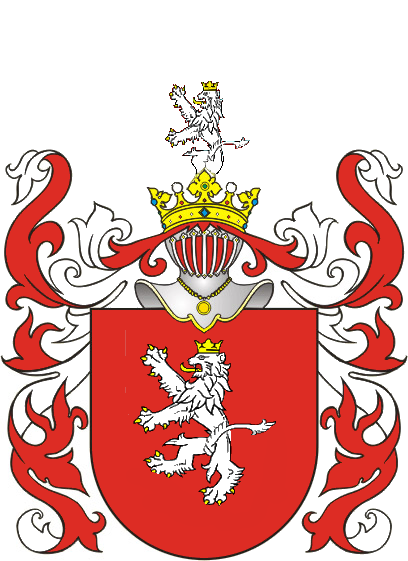
- Coat of arms
- Born: abt. 1521; Dąbrowica, Lublin County
- Died: 25 April 1574; Kock
- Family: Firlej
- Consort: Zofia Boner (Bonarowa); Zofia Dzik (Doliwa); Barbara Mniszech
- Issue: with Zofia Boner; Mikołaj Firlej; Andrzej Firlej; Jan Firlej; Piotr Firlej with Zofia Dzik; Anna Firlej; Henryk Firlej
- Father: Piotr Firlej
- Mother: Katarzyna Tęczynska

Jan Firlej (c. 1521, Dąbrowica, Lublin County – 1574, Kock) was a Polish nobleman (szlachcic), and Calvinist activist.

Jan became Crown Grand Marshal in 1563 and starost of Kraków in 1572. He agreed to the candidature of Henry III of France for the throne of Poland only on the condition that Henry sign the Henrican articles. He also held the titles of Voivode of Bełz, Lublin, and Kraków.

Around 1555, he founded a Calvinist church in Kock and built a family residence there.
