= Lew II coat of arms =

Polish coat of arms

Page with Tables XVIII - coat of arms "Lion Krupski" (Polish: Lew Krupski) 1st series of 5th from left to right

Lew II (Polish: Krupski, Borzyszkowski II Chadyn-Borzyszkowski, Szadaj-Borzyszkowski, Lew odmienny) - Polish coat of arms, used by several genera. Two of them were families from the region of Kaszuby. Coat of arms "Lew II" is a variant of the coat of arms "Leo" (Polish: Lew).

== Blazon ==
Description of emblem, proposed by Alfred Znamierowski (Polish: Alfred Znamierowski): Gules lion rampant or. Crest - three ostrich feathers. Mantling gules lined or.

Modifications

Mentioned in Hzhanski (Polish: Chrząński) differences in Tables (Polish: Tablica odmian) coat of arms "Krupski" (Polish: herb Krupskich). No color, he was quoted as Emilian Seligo-Zhernitsky (Polish: Emilian Szeliga-Żernicki), as the emblem of "Shada" and "Shadyn-Bozhishkovskih of Kashuba" (Polish: Szada- i Chadyn-Borzyszkowskich z Kaszub). Other branches of genus used a coat of arms "Bozhyshkovski", "Bozhyshkovski III ", "Lodz" (Polish: Borzyszkowski, Borzyszkowski III, Łodzia) could also use Coat of arms "Sas".

== Below members of the Lew II Clan ==
- Tadeusz Gaile (Polish: Tadeusz Gajl) specifies the list of the coat of arms genus: Krupski (Polish: Krupski), Vysk (Polish: Wysk), Zarembenski (Polish: Zarembieński). Vysk - this is one of the surnames Bozhishkovski (Polish: Borzyszkowski), but Przemyslaw Pragert (Polish: Przemysław Pragert) argues that wore this coat of arms family, which used the coat of arms "Bozhishkovski" (Polish: Borzyszkowski).
- Families Kashubian (Polish: Borzyszkowski): In this genus has been used the pseudonym "Hadyn" or "Shada" (Polish: Chadyn albo Szadaj). More - Pomeskie (Polish: Pomojski, Pomyjski, Pomeske, Pomyski).

== Gallery ==
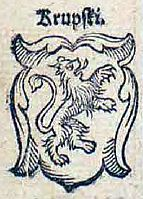
"Krupski" Coat of Arms (Polish: herb Krupski) in 1551 р. (published 1597)

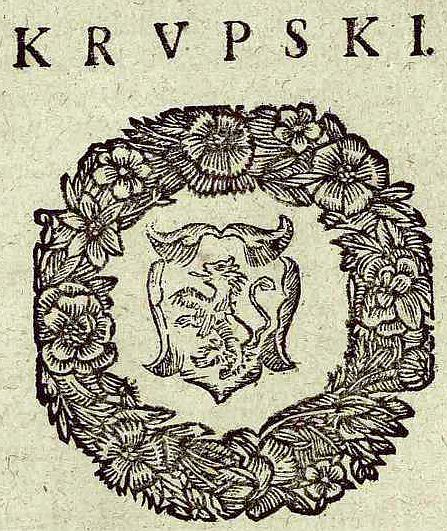
"Krupski" Coat of Arms (Polish: herb Krupski) in 1641

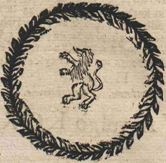
"Krupski" Coat of Arms (Polish: herb Krupskich) in 1696

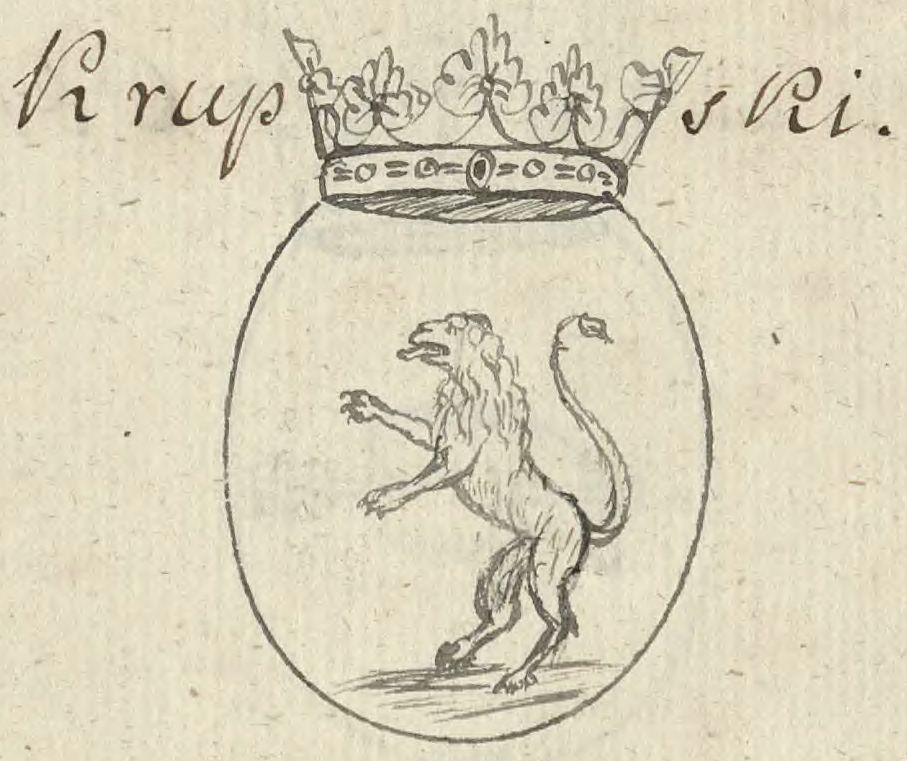
"Krupski" Coat of Arms (Polish: herb Krupski) in 1789

== See also ==
- Polish heraldry
- Heraldry
- Coat of arms
- List of Polish nobility coats of arms

=== References ===
- Tadeusz Gajl, "Herbarz polski od średniowiecza do XX wieku (ponad 4500 herbów szlacheckich 37 tysięcy nazwisk 55 tysięcy rodów)", L&L, 2007 r. ISBN 978-83-60597-10-1, s. 196, 406-536 (in Polish);
- Alfred Znamierowski, Paweł Dudziński "Wielka księga heraldyki", Świat Książki, Warszawa, 2008 r. ISBN 978-83-247-0100-1, s. 104-108 (in Polish);
- Przemysław Pragert, "Herbarz rodzin kaszubskich", BiT, 2001 r. ISBN 83-919852-6-1 (9788391985267), T. 1 s. 47, 143 (in Polish);

=== External links ===
- "Polish Armorial Middle Ages to 20th Century", Tadeusz Gajl, Gdańsk-2007 r. (in Polish)
