= Kopacz coat of arms =

Polish coat of arms

Kopacz
- Battle cry: Skrzydło
- Alternative names: Fossor, Krzydłow, Skrzydło, Topacz
- Earliest mention: 1404
- Towns: Peggau
- Families: 62 names altogether: Białoszycki, Bierułtowski, Blankenburg, Bojszowski, Borzymowski, Bydłowski, Chalczniowski, Chalczynowski, Chalkniowski, Chalknowski, Chalukowicz, Chwalczniewski, Czabelski, Dmosiński, Dziadowicz, Gedorwoch, Gedroch, Grądzki, Grodzicki, Halczyński, Halczynowski, Halknowski, Hałenowski, Iskra, Kamionacki, Kogkowski, Kopacz, Kopyciński, Kopyczyński, Korybski, Krypski, Krupski, Kupczyński, Kurzeski, Kurzewski, Lisogórski, Loga, Łuwczycki, Łysogórski, Miedźwiedzki, Międzybłocki, Moksiewicz, Mrochowski, Nawoy, Piędzicki, Plędzicki, Przecieski, Rac, Siegroth, Skidzieński, Sławik, Sroczkowski, Starowieyski, Szaszorski, Szegrod, Szygrod, Tomkowicz, Woyneko, Występ, Zegartowski, Zegliński, Zerwański, Żegliński

Kopacz is a Polish coat of arms. It was used by several szlachta families in the times of the Kingdom of Poland and Polish–Lithuanian Commonwealth.

== Gallery ==
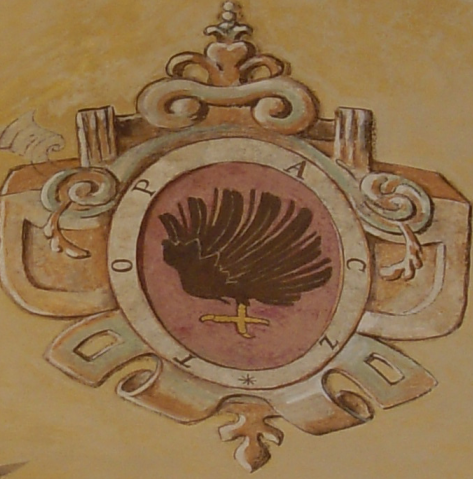
Topacz coat of arms (Kopacz) in Baranow-Sandomierski castle

== See also ==
- Polish heraldry
- Heraldic family
- List of Polish nobility coats of arms

== Bibliography ==
- Tadeusz Gajl: Herbarz polski od średniowiecza do XX wieku: ponad 4500 herbów szlacheckich 37 tysięcy nazwisk 55 tysięcy rodów. L&L, 2007, s. 406-539. ISBN 978-83-60597-10-1.
