= Wawrzyniec Gembicki =

Roman Catholic prelate

- Archbishop of Gniezno; Primate of Poland
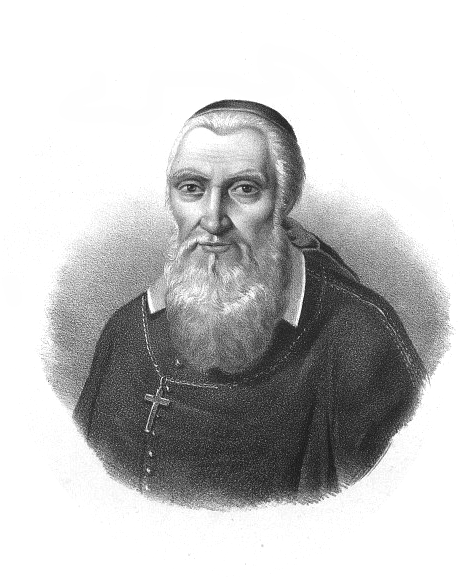
- Church: Catholic Church
- In office: 1616–1624
- Predecessor: Wojciech Baranowski
- Successor: Henryk Firlej
- Previous posts: Bishop of Chelmno (1600–1610); Bishop of Włocławek (1610–1616)

Orders
- Consecration: 1 April 1601 by Claudio Rangoni

Personal details
- Born: 5 August 1559 Gembitz, Kreis Mogilno, Province of Posen, Poland
- Died: 10 February 1624 (age 64) Gniezno, Poland

POL COA Nałęcz

Wawrzyniec Gembicki (5 August 1559 – 10 February 1624) was a Roman Catholic prelate who served as Archbishop of Gniezno (1616–1624), Bishop of Włocławek (1610–1616), and Bishop of Chelmno (1600–1610).

== Biography ==
Wawrzyniec Gembicki was born in Gembitz, Poland on 5 August 1559. On 10 November 1600, he was appointed during the papacy of Pope Clement VIII as Bishop of Chelmno. On 1 April 1601, he was consecrated bishop by Claudio Rangoni. On 19 April 1610, he was appointed during the papacy of Pope Paul V as Bishop of Włocławek. On 14 March 1616, he was appointed during the papacy of Pope Paul V as Archbishop of Gniezno. He served as Archbishop of Gniezno until his death on 10 February 1624. While bishop, he was the principal consecrator of Jan Wężyk, Bishop of Przemyśl (1620).

Catholic Church titles
| Preceded by Piotr Tylicki | Bishop of Chelmno; 1600–1610 | Succeeded by Maciej Konopacki |
| Preceded by Maciej Pstrokoński | Bishop of Włocławek; 1610–1616 | Succeeded by Paweł Wołucki |
| Preceded by Wojciech Baranowski | Archbishop of Gniezno; 1616–1624 | Succeeded by Henryk Firlej |
