= Piotr Firlej =

Polish nobleman (szlachcic)

- Coat of arms: Lewart
- Died: 1553
- Noble family: Firlej
- Consort: Katarzyna Teczynska (Topor)
- Father: Mikołaj Firlej
- Mother: Anna Mielecka

Piotr Firlej (died 1553) was a Polish nobleman (szlachcic).

Firlej married Katarzyna Teczynska and together they had three children: Jan Firlej, Mikołaj Firlej and Andrzej Firlej.

Piotr became voivode of Lublin Voivodship in 1537 and voivode of Ruthenian Voivodship in 1545. In 1514 he participated in the Battle of Orsza and was a trusted adviser of Queen Bona Sforza and King Zygmunt II August. He founded the cities of Janowiec and Lubartów and built castles there. He was also the half-owner of a castle in Odrzykoń, sparking a dispute between him and Jan Skotnicki which would later inspire Aleksander Fredro's comedy Zemsta (The Vengeance). The dispute ended after thirty years with the marriage of one of Firlej's sons to Zofia Skotnicka.
