= Henryk Firlej =

Polish bishop

His Excellency Henryk Firlej
- Archbishop of Gniezno; Primate of Poland
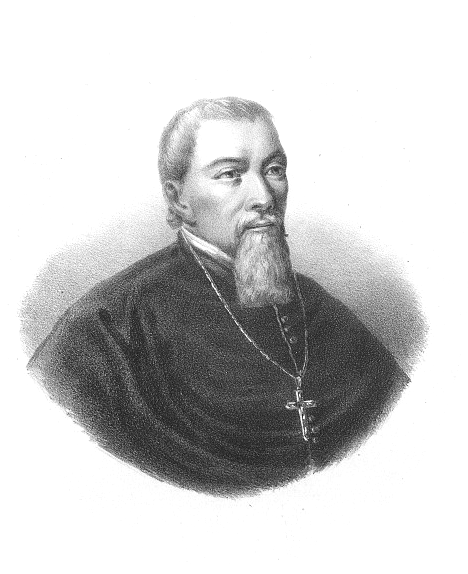
- Coat of arms: POL COA Lewart.svg
- Born: 1574; Balice, Poland
- Died: 1626 (aged 51–52); Skierniewice, Poland
- Family: Firlej
- Mother: Barbara Mniszech

Henryk Firlej of Dąbrowica, of the Lewart coat of arms (born in 1574 in Balice, died on February 25, 1626, in Skierniewice) – Archbishop of Gniezno and Primate of Poland from 1624 to 1626, Deputy Chancellor of the Crown from 1613 to 1618, Grand Referendary of the Crown in 1605, provost of the Płock Cathedral Chapter from 1607 to 1617, and Bishop of Płock from 1617 to 1624, commendatory provost of the Miechów monastery in 1612, Kraków scholastic in 1594, Royal Secretary in 1596, and Sandomierz canon until 1614.

== Biography ==
Son of Grand Marshal of the Crown Jan Firlej and Barbara Mniszech of her own coat of arms. Baptized in his youth as a Calvinist. After his father’s death, his mother and brothers raised him as a Catholic. Half-brother of Grand Treasurer of the Crown Jan Firlej, Mikołaj, Piotr, and Andrzej.

He initially studied in Ingolstadt and Graz under the Jesuits, later in Padua and Rome. In Rome, he joined the household of Pope Clement VIII, becoming his chamberlain, domestic prelate, referendary of both signatures, apostolic protonotary, and Roman count. In 1595, he was ordained a subdeacon in Rome. In 1596, he returned to Poland with the papal nuncio and, on the pope’s recommendation, joined the Crown Chancery. In 1598, he was ordained a priest. During the Zebrzydowski Rebellion in 1606, he supported the king. On October 7, 1606, he signed the Janowiec Agreement.

Between 1617 and 1624, on his initiative, the early Baroque Bishops of Płock Palace in Brok nad Bugiem was built. In 1625, he began the Baroque reconstruction of the Łowicz Collegiate Church. He also built a church in Ciernice and one of the chapels at the Dominican Church in Lublin.

His career was owed to his lineage, the patronage of the king and pope, as well as his education, gentle character, and the splendor with which he surrounded himself.

He died in 1626 in Skierniewice and was buried in the Łowicz Collegiate Church in a tin sarcophagus.

Preceded by Feliks Kryski	Deputy Chancellor of the Crown ?–?	Succeeded by Andrzej Lipski
Catholic Church titles
Preceded by Paweł Wołucki	Bishop of Łuck; 1616–1617	Succeeded by Andrzej Lipski
Preceded by Marcin Szyszkowski	Bishop of Płock; 1617–1624	Succeeded by Jan Kuczborski
Preceded by Wawrzyniec Gembicki	Archbishop of Gniezno; Primate of Poland; 1624–1626	Succeeded by Jan Wężyk
