= Dąbrowica, Lublin County =

Dąbrowica
- Village
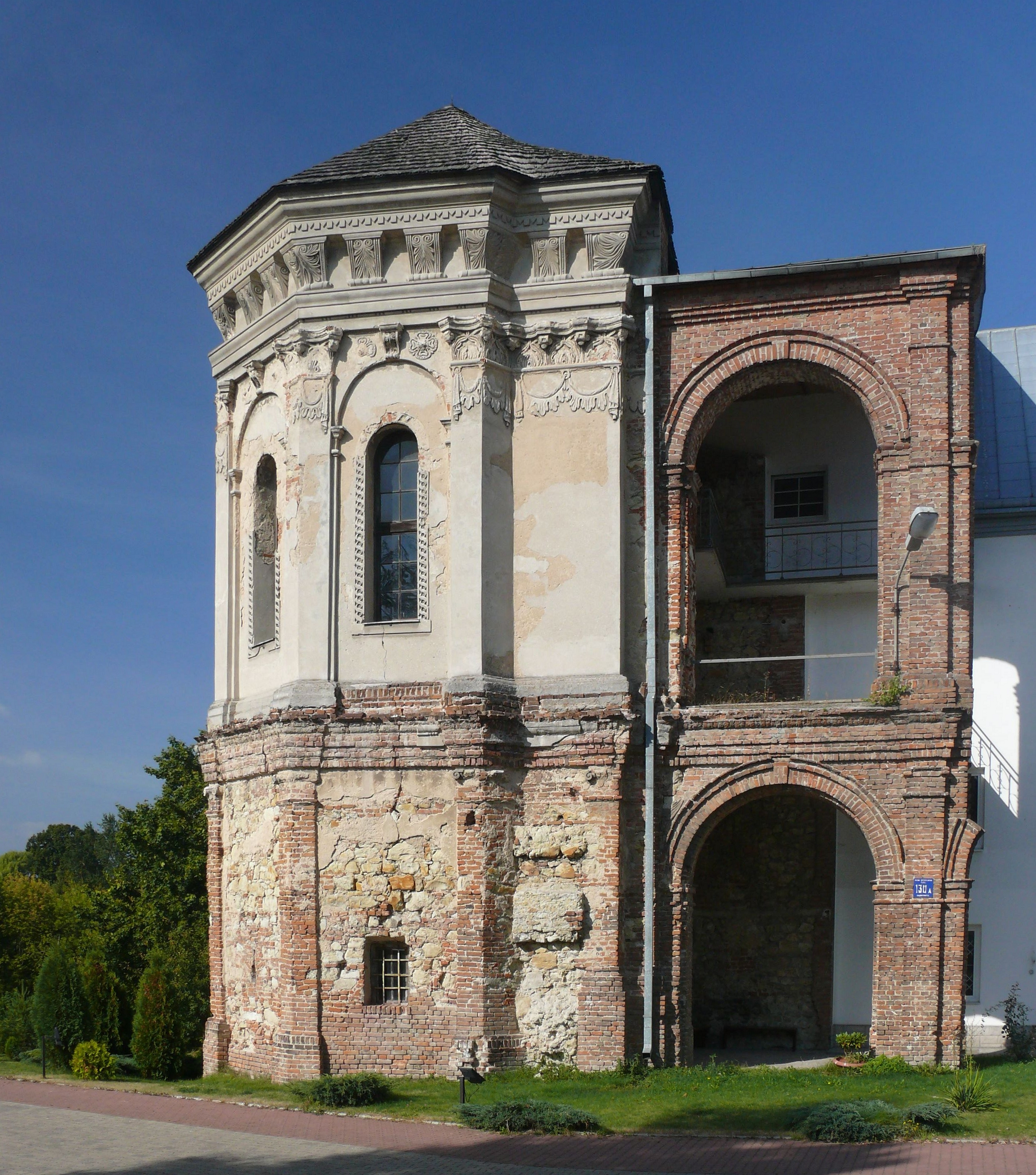
- Ruins of the Firlej family chateau

- Location within Poland
- Coordinates: 51°16′N 22°27′E
- Country: Poland
- Voivodeship: Lublin
- County: Lublin
- Gmina: Jastków

Population
  - Total: 1,095

Dąbrowica [dɔmbrɔˈvit͡sa] is a village in the administrative district of Gmina Jastków, within Lublin County, Lublin Voivodeship, in eastern Poland.
