= Mikołaj Firlej (died 1526) =

Polish nobleman, hetman, diplomat, and expert of southeast Europe

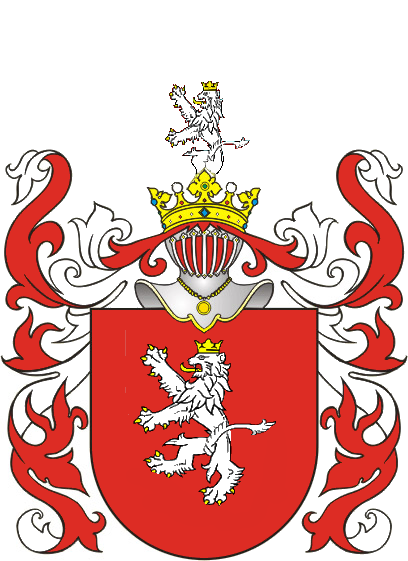
- Coat of arms: Lewart
- Died: 1526
- Family: Firlej
- Consort (Gryf): Anna Mielecka
- Issue: Katarzyna Firlej; Piotr Firlej
- Father: Piotr z Dąbrowicy

Mikołaj Firlej (died 1526) was a Polish nobleman (szlachcic), hetman, diplomat, and expert of southeast Europe.

Mikołaj became voivode of the Lublin Voivodeship in 1507, voivode of Sandomierz Voivodeship in 1514, Great Hetman of the Crown in 1515, and castellan of Kraków in 1520.

He was several times envoy to the courts of Turkey and Hungary. He participated in the Jagiellonian-Habsburg congress at Vienna in 1515. He fought against Tatars in 1516–1519, 1519–1521 and 1523–1524 but inefficiently commanded the Polish cavalry during the war with the Teutonic Order.

He is one of the characters on the famous painting by Jan Matejko, Prussian Homage.
