= Mikołaj Firlej (d. 1588) =

Lublin voivode

Mikołaj Firlej (died 1588) was a Lublin voivode.
