= Lewart coat of arms =

Polish coat of arms

Lewart
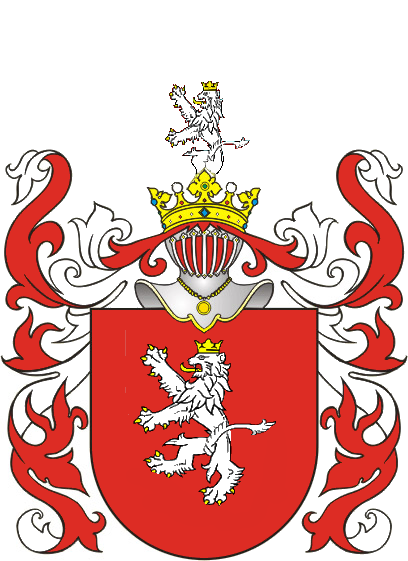
- Battle cry: unknown
- Alternative names: Leopardus, Levardus, Lewrat, Walny
- Earliest mention: 1320-1417
- Towns: Novogrudek, Minsk, Krakow, Lublin, Mazovian, Sandomierz and Dukla.
- Families: 50 names altogether: Lewart, Bakowski, Beski, Bielanski-Firlej, Bielanski, Bochotnicki, Broniewski, Bunski, Dubrowski, Firlej, GorskiI, GorskiII, Haupt, Jakubczyk, Kczewski, Kizewski, Kniazyszcze, Konarski, Krupski, Krwacki-Firlej, Krwacki, Lewandowski, Lewartowicz, Lewartowski, Lewinski, Lwowski, Lakocki, Marcuszowski, Markuszewski, Melgiewski, Motycki, Nejmanowski, Opocki, Puchniowski, Podolenski, Pety, Skwarc, Szlapa, Tokarski, Trecyusz, Tretius, Tulowski, Ujezdzki, Wali-uszy, Walny, Wierzchanowski, Wodopol, Wszelaczytnski, Zakrzewski-Firlej, Zakrzewski.

Lewart is a Polish coat of arms. It was borne by several noble families of the Polish–Lithuanian Commonwealth. Families that descended from the original medieval clan assumed this coat of arms, as well as those legally adopted into the clan.

== History ==
- Duke Casimir II the Just (High Duke of Poland from 1177 to 1194) initially established the clan in the 12th century.
- The coat of arms was bestowed upon its first bearer for a feat of great bravery whilst holding off a superior force in both strength and number. This caused the bestower, King Władysław Łokietek (reigned 1320–1333), to remark that a leopard, if pushed, can defend itself from a lion.
- Its origins are German (frankońskie). The first known judicial record (Wali-ears) originates from 1417 (Z. Dunin-Kozicki, Inscriptiones clenodiales, p. 35).

== Blazon ==
The coat of arms is a rampant leopard on either a blue or red background. The leopard is crowned with a silver and gold crown.

== Notable bearers ==
Notable bearers of this coat of arms include:

- The Markuszewski family: landowners in the regions around Novogrudek Kraków and Minsk.
- Henryk Firlej (1574–1626): a Polish szlachcic, bishop of Łuck (1616–1617), Archbishop of Gniezno and Primate of Poland from 1624; Deputy Chancellor of the Crown (Polish: Podkanclerzy koronny).

== Families ==
Below are the fifty members of the Lewart Clan. Many are now extinct. Notable members are in bold.

Lewart, Bakowski, Beski, Bielanski-Firlej, Bielanski, Bochotnicki, Broniewski, Bunski, Dubrowski, Firlej, GorskiI, GorskiII, Haupt, Jakubczyk, Kczewski, Kizewski, Kniazyszcze, Konarski, Krupski, Krwacki-Firlej, Krwacki, Lewandowski, Lewartowicz, Lewartowski, Lewinski, Lwowski, Lakocki, Marcuszowski, Markuszewski, Melgiewski, Motycki, Nejmanowski, Opocki, Puchniowski, Podolenski, Pety, Skwarc, Szlapa, Tokarski, Trecyusz, Tretius, Tulowski, Ujezdzki, Wali-uszy, Walny, Wierzchanowski, Wodopol, Wszelaczytnski, Zakrzewski-Firlej, Zakrzewski.

== See also ==
- Polish heraldry
- Heraldry
- Coat of arms

== Bibliography ==
- Bartosz Paprocki, "Herby rycerstwa polskiego", Kraków, 1584 r.;
- Simon Okolski, "Orbis Polonus", Kraków, 1642 r., T. 1–3;
- Ks. Kacper Niesiecki, "Herby i familie rycerskie tak w Koronie jako y w W.X.L.", Lwów, 1728 r.;
- Tadeusz Gajl, "Polish Armorial Middle Ages to 20th Century", Gdańsk, 2007 r.
