= Florian Stablewski =

Polish archbishop and politician (1841–1906)

His Eminence Florian Stablewski
- Cardinal, Primate of Poland
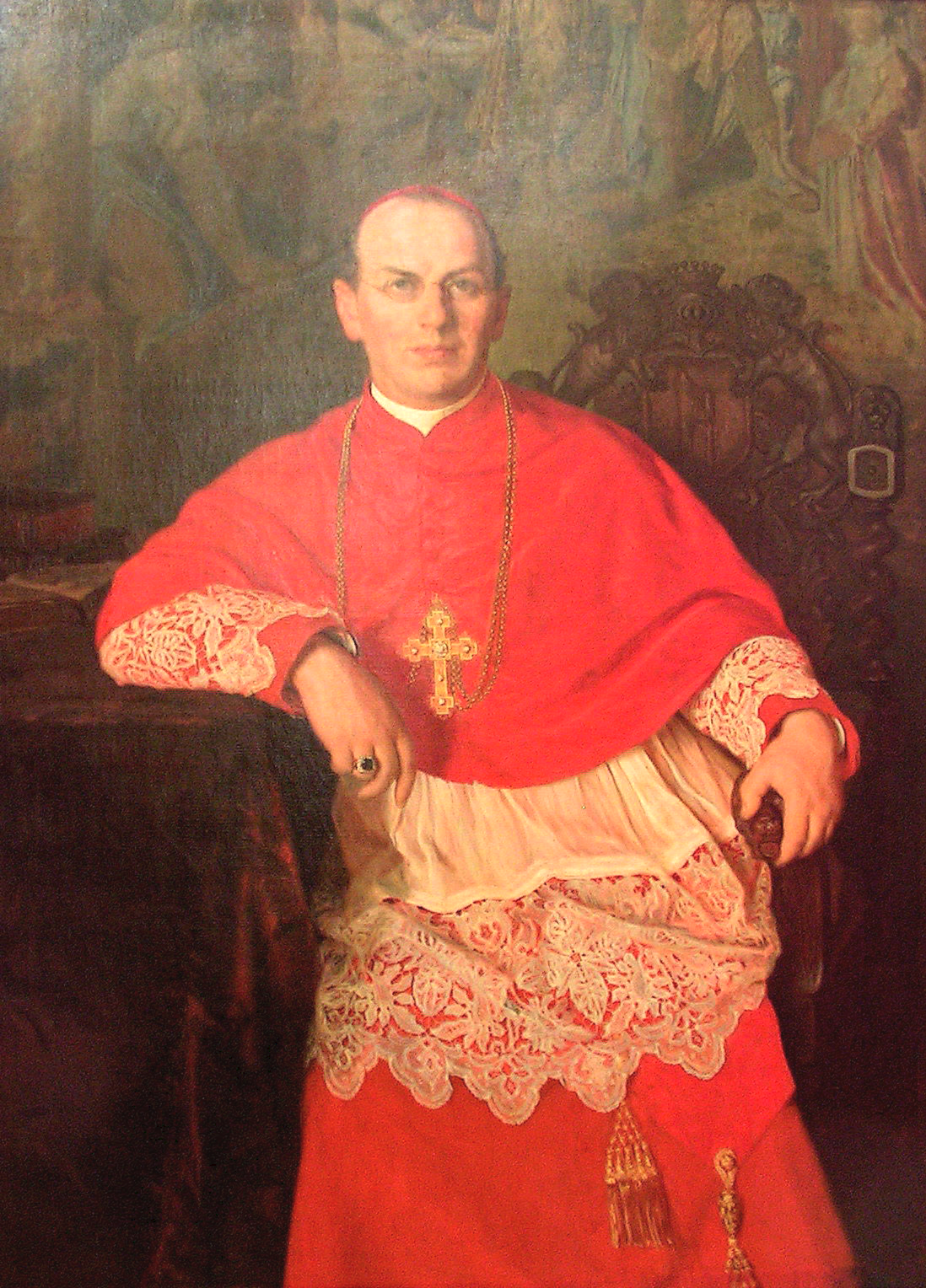
- Archdiocese: Gniezno
- See: Archdiocese of Gniezno
- Installed: 1891
- Term ended: 1906

Orders
- Ordination: 24 February 1866
- Consecration: 17 January 1892 by Georg von Kopp
- Rank: Cardinal-Priest

Personal details
- Born: 16 October 1841 Wschowa
- Died: 24 November 1906 (aged 65) Poznań
- Denomination: Roman Catholic
- Coat of arms

Florian Stablewski of the Oksza coat of arms (born 16 October 1841 in Wschowa; died 24 November 1906 in Poznań) was a Polish Roman Catholic cleric, a deputy to the Prussian Landtag from 1876 to 1891, the Metropolitan Archbishop of Gniezno and Poznań, and the Primate of Poland from 1891 to 1906.

== Biography ==
He was the son of a former Napoleonic soldier, the impoverished nobleman Onufry Stablewski of the Oksza coat of arms, and Emilia from Kurowska. He was educated at St. Mary Magdalene Gymnasium in Poznań and later at the gymnasium in Trzemeszno, which he completed in 1861. From 1861 to 1863, he studied at the theological seminary in Poznań, and subsequently at the Ludwig-Maximilians-Universität München. In 1866, he earned a doctorate in theology and was ordained to the priesthood in Gniezno.

He served as a pastor in Wielichowo, Tarnowo Podgórne, and Śrem, where he also worked as a catechist and taught Hebrew at the local gymnasium. He was dismissed from his post in 1873 after refusing to comply with an order requiring that religious instruction be conducted in German. He then became parish priest in Września, where he was simultaneously active in craft, industrial, and agricultural associations. He also supported cultural initiatives in a broad sense. He helped establish a people’s bank in Śrem. From 1876 to 1891, he served as a deputy in the Prussian Landtag and was active in the Polish Circle, advocating, among other things, for the preservation of Polish as a language of instruction in schools. He was an honorary conventual chaplain of the Order of Malta (a member since 1867).

On 14 December 1891, he was appointed Metropolitan Archbishop of Gniezno and Poznań, with the title of Primate of Poland. He assumed administration of the archdiocese on 13 January 1892, and on 17 January received episcopal consecration. In his episcopal ministry, despite the complex internal circumstances of the time, he placed the affairs of the Church at the forefront. He promoted within the archdiocese the so-called patronage movement outlined in Pope Leo XIII’s encyclical Rerum novarum. He founded the periodical Przewodnik Katolicki as well as the St. Adalbert Printing House and Bookstore in Poznań. He sought compromise on issues of Polish national rights; during the school strikes from 1901 until 1904 and in 1906, he tried to ease tensions by submitting petitions to the German Emperor. At the same time, his conciliatory approach toward the partitioning power exposed him to criticism from parts of society, including circles associated with the newspapers Orędownik and Postęp. He opposed the Polonization -carried out by activists from the Prussian partition - of Upper Silesians within the Reich. He was an honorary member of the Poznań Society of Friends of Learning.

He was buried in the cathedral in Poznań.

Preceded by Juliusz Dinder	Archbishop of Gniezno; 1891–1906	Succeeded by Edward Likowski
Preceded by Juliusz Dinder	Archbishop of Poznań; 1891–1906	Succeeded by Edward Likowski
