= Jan Wężyk =

Polish noble and Roman Catholic bishop

Most Reverend Jan Wężyk
- Archbishop of Gniezno; Primate of Poland
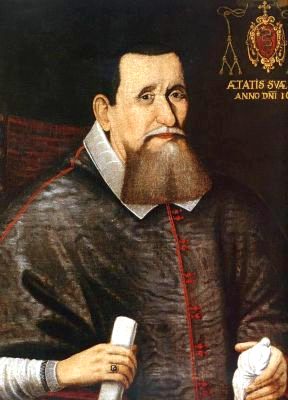
- Church: Catholic Church
- Archdiocese: Archdiocese of Gniezno
- In office: 1626-1638
- Predecessor: Henryk Firlej
- Successor: Jan Lipski
- Previous posts: Bishop of Przemyśl (1620–1624); Bishop of Poznań (1624–1627)

Orders
- Consecration: 1620 by Wawrzyniec Gembicki

Personal details
- Born: 1575 Wola Wężykowa, Poland
- Died: 27 May 1638 (age 63) Gniezno, Poland

POL COA Wąż

Jan Wężyk (1575–1638), of Wąż Coat of Arms, was a Polish noble and Roman Catholic bishop and Primate of Poland.

== Biography ==
Jan Wężyk was born in Wola Wężykowa, Poland in 1575. In 1619, he was selected by the King of Poland as Bishop of Przemyśl and confirmed by Pope Paul V on 17 Feb 1620. Later in 1620, he was consecrated bishop by Wawrzyniec Gembicki, Archbishop of Gniezno. On 13 May 1624, he was appointed during the papacy of Pope Urban VIII as Bishop of Poznań and installed on 1 Jul 1624. In 1626, he was selected by the King of Poland as Archbishop of Gniezno and Primate of Poland and confirmed by Pope Urban VIII on 22 Mar 1627.

He served as interrex (for 9 months) after the death of king Sigismund III Vasa in 1632, before the royal election of Władysław IV Waza. As the interrerx he supported improving the procedures of the royal elections. He was a political ally of Polish queen consort Constance of Austria, and took part in reform of church law in Poland. He authored Synodus provincialis Gnesnensis A.D. 1628 die 22 mai celebrata (1629), Synodus provincialis Gnesensis (1634), and Constitutiones Synodorum Metropolitanae Ecclesiae Gnesnensis Provincialium (1630).

He served as Archbishop of Gniezno and Primate of Poland until his death on 27 May 1638.

== Episcopal succession ==
Episcopal succession of Jan Wężyk

While bishop, he was the principal consecrator of:

- Paweł Piasecki, Bishop of Kamyanets-Podilskyi (1628);
- Andrzej Gembicki, Auxiliary Bishop of Gniezno (1628);
- Jan Chrzciciel Zamoyski, Bishop of Bacău (1633);
- Andrzej Szołdrski, Bishop of Kyiv (1634);
- Stanisław Grochowski, Archbishop of Lviv (1634);
- Jan Lipski, Bishop of Chelmno (1636);
- Piotr Gembicki, Bishop of Przemyśl (1637);

and the principal co-consecrator of:

- Maciej Łubieński, Bishop of Chełm (1621).

Catholic Church titles
Preceded by Stanisław Sieciński	Bishop of Przemyśl; 1620–1624	Succeeded by Achacy Grochowski
Preceded by Andrzej Opaleński	Bishop of Poznań; 1624–1627	Succeeded by Maciej Łubieński
Preceded by Henryk II Firlej	Primate of Poland; Archbishop of Gniezno; 1626–1638	Succeeded by Jan Lipski
