= Mikołaj Zieleński =

Polish composer and organist (fl. 1611)

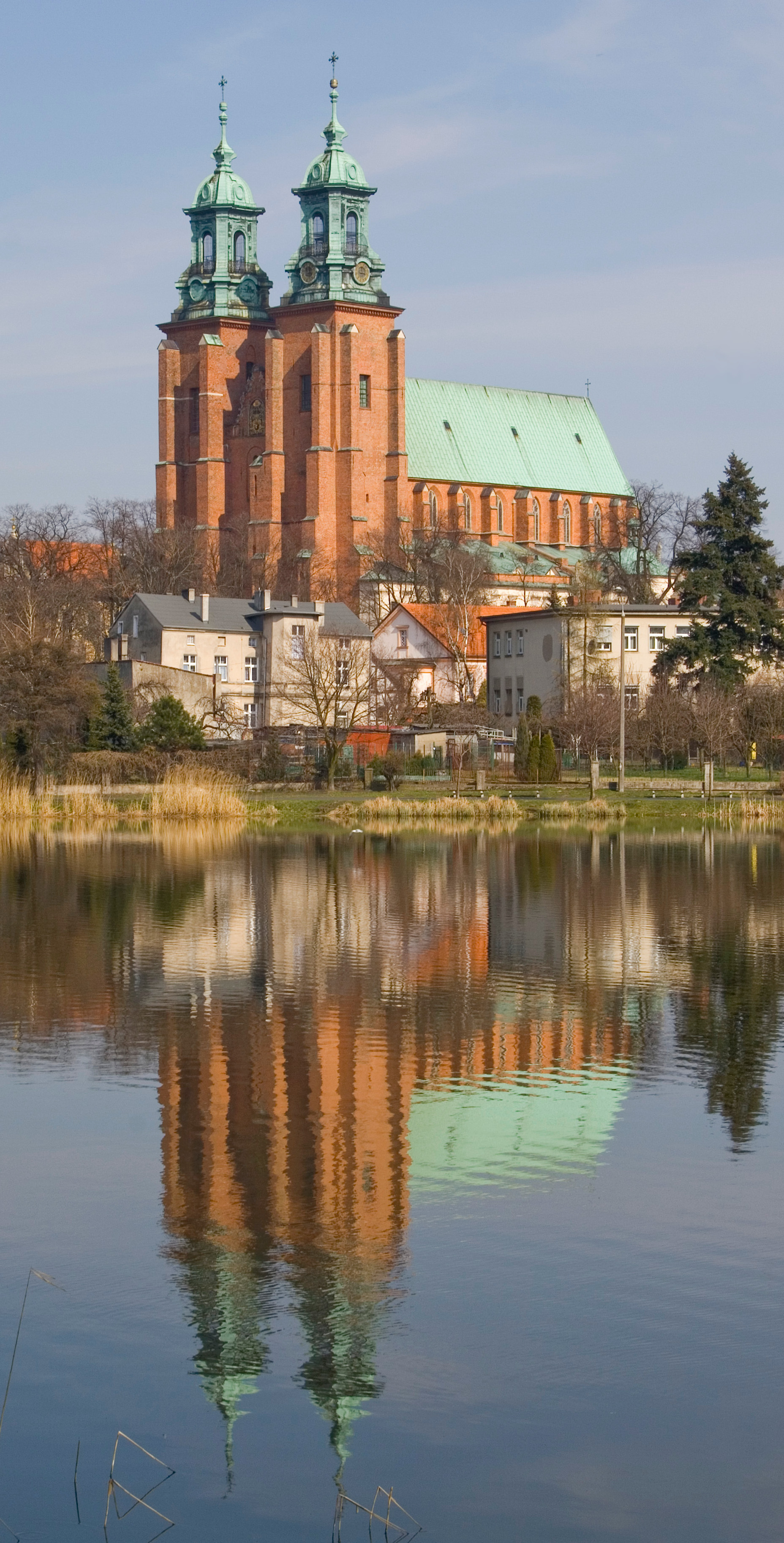
Gniezno Cathedral

Mikołaj Zieleński (or Zelenscius; fl. 1611) was a Polish composer, organist, and Kapellmeister to the primate Baranowski, Archbishop of Gniezno.

== Life ==
Neither the date of his birth nor of his death are known; documents from Płock Cathedral state he was from Warka and show him to have been a member of the diocese in 1604 and organist in 1606, and in 1611 he married and was involved in a court case. The March 1611 dedication of his book places him at the Archbishop's court in Łowicz, and that Baranowski hired no replacement suggests he may have survived his patron, who died in 1615.

Zieleński's only known surviving works are contained in two 1611 liturgical cycles of polychoral works, the Offertoria/Communes totius anni. These were dedicated to the Archbishop of Gniezno, Wojciech Baranowski. The whole comprises eight part-books and a ninth book, the Partitura pro organo, which constitutes the organ accompaniment. This publication contains in all 131 pieces written for various vocal and also vocal and instrumental ensembles, all with organ accompaniment.

In addition to Offertories and Communions the two volume Venetian publication contains over a dozen other pieces, such as hymns, antiphons, a magnificat, and even three instrumental fantasias. In his compositions Zieleński relies on his own creative invention and does not, in general, make use of the cantus firmi. The few pre-existing melodies which may be traced out in his pieces are based not on plainsong but on the melodies of Polish songs. The sets consist of large-scale double- and triple-choir antiphons, as well as some monodic works typical of the Seconda pratica style of early Monteverdi. Zieleński's music is the first known Polish music set in the style of the Baroque.

== Works ==
- Offertoria totius anni, Venetijs, Apud Iacobum Vincentium MDCXI 1611
- Mikołaj Zieleński, Offertoria et communiones
- Magnificat

== Sources ==
- Mirosław Perz, article "Mikołaj Zieleński" in The New Grove Dictionary of Music and Musicians, 2001.
- Mikolaj Zieleński Opera omnia ed. W. Malinowski and Z. Jachimecki in Monumenta Musicae in Polonia (ser.a, i/1–) Polskie Wydawnictwo Muzyczne S.A., (5 vols 1966–91; a 6th has appeared since)
