= Aureliopolis in Lydia =

City in the Roman province of Lydia

Coordinates: 38°28′34″N 27°52′40″E

Aureliopolis in Lydia (Ancient Greek: Αυρηλιούπολις Λυδίας) is a city in the Roman province of Lydia, previously called Tmolus or in Greek Τμῶλος (Tmolos). It issued coinage under each of these names, and one coin combines both names. In the Synecdemus it appears as Auliou Kome. The name "Aureliopolis" was given in honour of the emperor Marcus Aurelius.

== History ==
It was a town of ancient Lydia, situated on Mount Tmolus, and was destroyed during the Lydia earthquake, otherwise known as the Earthquake of the Twelve Cities, in 17 CE. Some coins are extant with the inscription Τμωλείτων, but the actual minting of the coins issued in its name may have been done in the more important neighbouring city of Sardis.

== Bishop ==
Aureliopolis was the site of an early bishopric and the names of five of its ancient bishops are preserved in a number of documents.

- Antiochus took part in the First Council of Nicaea in 325
- John participated actively in the Council of Ephesus in 321
- Eutropius signed a synodical decree of Patriarch Gennadius I of Constantinople in about 460
- Theodotus was at the Trullan Council of 692, and Nicolaus at the Second Council of Nicaea in 787

No longer a residential bishopric, Aureliopolis in Lydia is today listed by the Catholic Church as a titular see. Titular bishops include:

- Mateusz Lipski (24 Nov 1823 - 28 Feb 1831), Bishop of Minsk)
- Franz Anton Gindl (30 Sep 1831 Appointed - 2 Jul 1832), Bishop of Brno
- Antonín Arnošt Schaaffgotsche (11 Jul 1839 - 27 Jan 1842) Bishop of Brno)
- John Francis (William) Whelan, (7 Jun 1842 - 13 Dec 1876)
- Jean-Pierre-Ignace Galfione, (31 Aug 1880 Appointed - 19 Dec 1881)
- Joseph Colgan (19 May 1882 - 25 Nov 1886), Archbishop of Madras)
- Edward Likowski (17 Mar 1887 - 13 Aug 1914, Archbishop of Gniezno e Poznań)
- Hubert-Olivier Chalifoux (30 Sep 1914 Appointed - 17 Mar 1922)
- João de Oliveira Matos Ferreira (11 Dec 1922 - 29 Aug 1962)
- Salvatore Asta (13 Oct 1962 Appointed - 30 Dec 2004)
