= Andrzej Wilczyński =

Polish Roman Catholic prelate

Most Reverend Andrzej Wilczyński
- Auxiliary Bishop of Gniezno; Titular Bishop of Teodosia
- Church: Catholic Church
- Archdiocese: Archdiocese of Gniezno
- In office: 1608–1627

Orders
- Consecration: 1608 by Wojciech Baranowski

Personal details
- Died: July 1627 Gniezno, Poland

Andrzej Wilczyński (died July 1627) was a Roman Catholic prelate who served as Auxiliary Bishop of Gniezno (1608–1627).

== Biography ==
On 13 Oct 1608, Andrzej Wilczyński was appointed during the papacy of Pope Paul V as Auxiliary Bishop of Gniezno and Titular Bishop of Teodosia. In 1608, he was consecrated bishop by Wojciech Baranowski, Archbishop of Gniezno. While bishop, he was the principal co-consecrator of Jan Kuczborski, Bishop of Chelmno (1614).
