= Jakub Uchański =

Polish archbishop

His Excellency Jakub Uchański
- Archbishop of Gniezno, Bishop of Chełm, Bishop of Wrocław, Primate of Poland
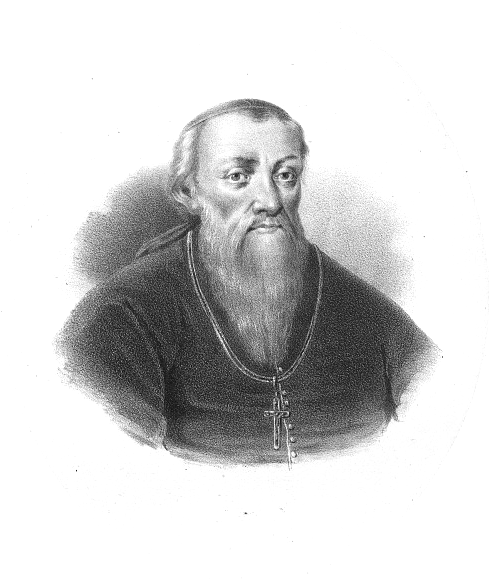
- 1864 print based on the original tomb effigy
- Diocese: Roman Catholic Archdiocese of Gniezno
- See: Archdiocese of Gniezno

Orders
- Ordination: Unknown

Personal details
- Born: 1502 Uchanie, Kingdom of Poland
- Died: 1581 (aged 78–79) Łowicz, Polish–Lithuanian Commonwealth
- Buried: Cathedral Basilica of the Assumption and St. Nicholas in Łowicz
- Denomination: Roman Catholic
- Coat of arms

Jakub Uchański (1502–81), of Radwan coat of arms, was a Polish clergyman and statesman, archbishop of Gniezno and primate of Poland from 1562 to 1581, interrex from 1572 to 1573 and from 1574 to 1575.

== Biography ==
He began his service at the royal court as a secretary and administrator of the lands of Queen of Poland Bona Sforza. With her support he received the position of the ecclesiastical Crown Referendary, and several canonries. He became the bishop of Chełm in 1551, bishop of Włocławek in 1561 (chosen in 1557), and archbishop of Gniezno and primate of Poland in 1562.

He was a close advisor to King Sigismund II Augustus, and supported many of his plans, including the one to divorce Catherine of Austria. He threw his weight behind the pro-reform camp, and was actively involved in bringing about the transformation of the Polish–Lithuanian union into the Polish–Lithuanian Commonwealth. He represented King Sigismund II Augustus in negotiations with Lithuanian magnates in Vilna, and he took part in the Lithuanian Sejm in Bielsk Podlaski of 1564.

He looked favorably on the idea of creating a Polish national church, though he stopped short at breaking away from Rome. He also supported dialogue with Protestants, advocating religious tolerance. For his liberal religious views he was scorned in Vatican and was briefly excommunicated in 1558 by Pope Paul IV, who suspected him of heresy. Uchański was even summoned before the Roman Inquisition; however, he refused the summons to Rome and the conflict was solved via diplomacy. Uchański, while supportive of the Protestants and tolerance, never abandoned Catholic faith and during the dynasty change the 1570s insisted on the election of the monarchs. Even though his stance towards Protestants was quite liberal, he was a political opponent of Calvinist Marshal of the Crown Jan Firlej, especially during the political crises of the 1570s, when Uchański tried to exclude the lesser nobles (members of the Sejm) from the decision-making processes and rely solely on the Senate of Poland (Firlej also wanted to elect a Protestant king to the Polish throne).

After the death of Sigismund II Augustus, last of the Jagiellon dynasty, he became the interrex until Henry of Valois was elected as the first king of the new Polish–Lithuanian Commonwealth. After Henry's sudden return to France, Uchański once again took the position of the interrex, until Anna Jagiellon became the queen of Poland. In 1575 he joined the pro-Habsburg camp and together with some other Polish senators he proclaimed Emperor Maximilian II to be the king of Poland, however due to opposition from many other Polish nobles (szlachta) Maximilian lost, and Stephen Báthory was eventually to become the king of Poland.

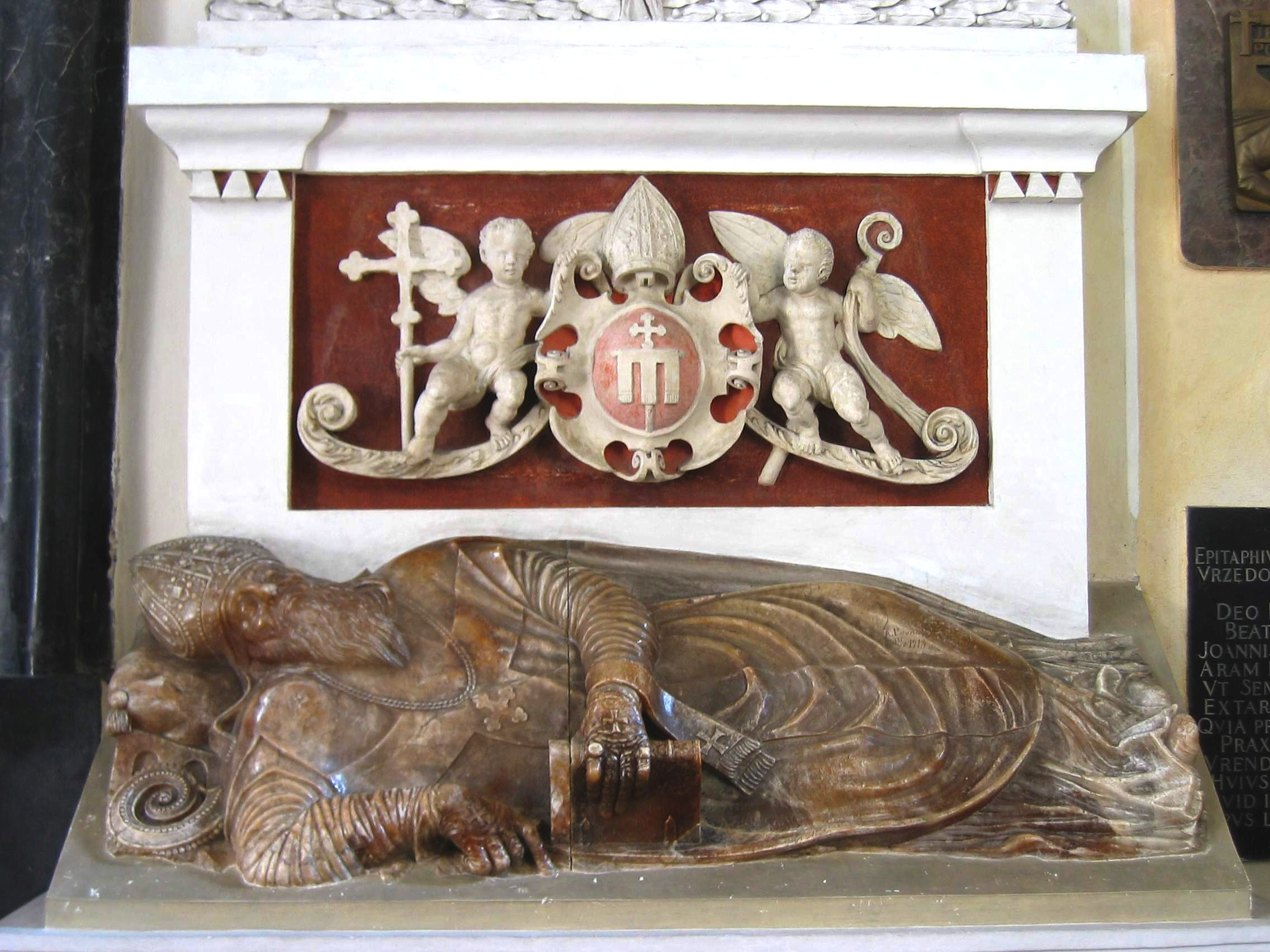
Tomb effigy of Polish primate Jakub Uchański in Łowicz cathedral 1580

He was also a translator and a protector of many liberal thinkers of the Polish renaissance, including Andrzej Frycz Modrzewski and Jakub Wujek.

== Uchański lineage ==
Since his consecrator is unknown and some of the bishops alive today traced (erroneously as it could be shown later) their episcopal lineage back to him, the person of Jakub Uchański was very important for the history of the Catholic Church. This so-called Uchański lineage includes many members of the Polish episcopate and Pope Pius X.

In 2007, it became clear that Uchanski was never part of this succession line. Its roots can be traced back to bishop Claudio Rangoni, who was bishop of Reggio Emilia between 1592 and 1621. He worked as Apostolic Nuncio to Poland from 1598 to 1607. Claudio Rangoni belongs to the Rebiba lineage, so the part of Uchański-lineage up of Claudio Rangoni is a branch of the Rebiba lineage.

Catholic Church titles
Preceded by Jerzy Przerębski	Primate of Poland; Archbishop of Gniezno; 1562–1581	Succeeded by Stanisław I Karnkowski
