= Madaliński =

- Antoni Madaliński - Polish Lieutenant General
- Jan Madaliński - Roman Catholic prelate
