= Interrex (Poland) =

Leader of the Polish Kingdom during interregnums

The institution of interrex existed in the Crown of the Kingdom of Poland, whose ruling classes liked to view their Commonwealth as an heir to Roman Empire traditions. The Commonwealth's monarch, holding a double title of the Two Nations (King of Poland and Grand Duke of Lithuania), entered into their office by free election (wolna elekcja), which often led to a relatively long interregnum. Since 1572, the role of interrex traditionally fell to the Archbishop of Gniezno and Primate of Poland of the Roman Catholic Church. The Archbishop could nominate a replacement (traditionally he would choose the Bishop of Kujawy).

The interrex would represent the country on the international scene and oversee the internal administration until a new king was elected. In special circumstances he could declare war and negotiate peace. He summoned and presided over the convocation sejm and the election sejm, the gathering of nobility that elected the king. He also announced the election of the king.

Interreges of the Commonwealth
Took the office of interrex in	Gave up the office of interrex in	Interrex
1572	1573	Jakub Uchański
1574	1575	Jakub Uchański (again)
1586	1587	Stanisław Karnkowski
1632	1632	Jan Wężyk
1648	1648	Maciej Łubieński
1668	1669	Mikołaj Prażmowski
1673	1674	Kazimierz Florian Czartoryski
1674	1674	illness and death of Kazimierz Florian Czartoryski led to him being replaced by the bishop of Kraków, Andrzej Trzebicki and the Bishop of Poznań, Stefan Wierzbowski
1696	1697	Michał Stefan Radziejowski
1704	1705	Michał Stefan Radziejowski (again)
1704	1705	Michał Stefan Radziejowski was stripped of his authority by the Pope and went into hiding. He was replaced by the Bishop of Poznań, Mikołaj Święcicki
1733	1734	Teodor Andrzej Potocki
1763	1764	Władysław Aleksander Łubieński

== See also ==
- Interrex
- Regent
- Reichsverweser
