= Wincenty Niałek =

Catholic archbishop of Gniezno, 1220–1232

His Excellency Wincenty Niałek
- Archbishop of Gniezno
- Church: Roman Catholic
- Archdiocese: Gniezno
- Installed: 1220
- Term ended: 1232
- Predecessor: Henryk Kietlicz
- Successor: Pełka

Personal details
- Born: 12th century
- Died: 1232

Wincenty of Niałka (Vincent) was the Archbishop of Gniezno in the years 1220–1232.

== Early life ==
He was born in the town of Czarnków to a noble family, the Jeleniów-Niałków whose lands were located on the Obra river border between the Polish principalities of Wielkopolska and Silesia. He probably studied abroad, perhaps in Italy as he was well-educated, and well-versed in Roman politics.

In his youth he had a wife, who bore him at least two children, Miroslaw and Boguchwała.(or possibly Vincent). At this time Catholic priests – especially those with lower ordination – were often married. It was only during the reign of his predecessor archbishop Henry Kietlicz that strict observance of clergy celibacy was enforced. At any rate by 1211 he was a widower.

From 1208 held the office of chancellor at the court of Władysław III Spindleshanks the Duke of Wielkopolska and supported his policies. Against this background, he came into conflict with the conservative Archbishop of Gniezno, Henryk Kietlicz, who excommunicated him and his duke in 1210.

In retaliation Archbishop Henryk was forced into exile, finding the protection of Wladyslaw's rival, Henry the Bearded of Silesia. The archbishop and duke were, however, reconciled in 1213, with part of the settlement including Wincenty becoming a canon at Gniezno Cathedral. In 1216 or 1217 Archbishop Kietlicz raised him to the position of provost as a gesture in the "cease-fire".

== Election to Bishop ==
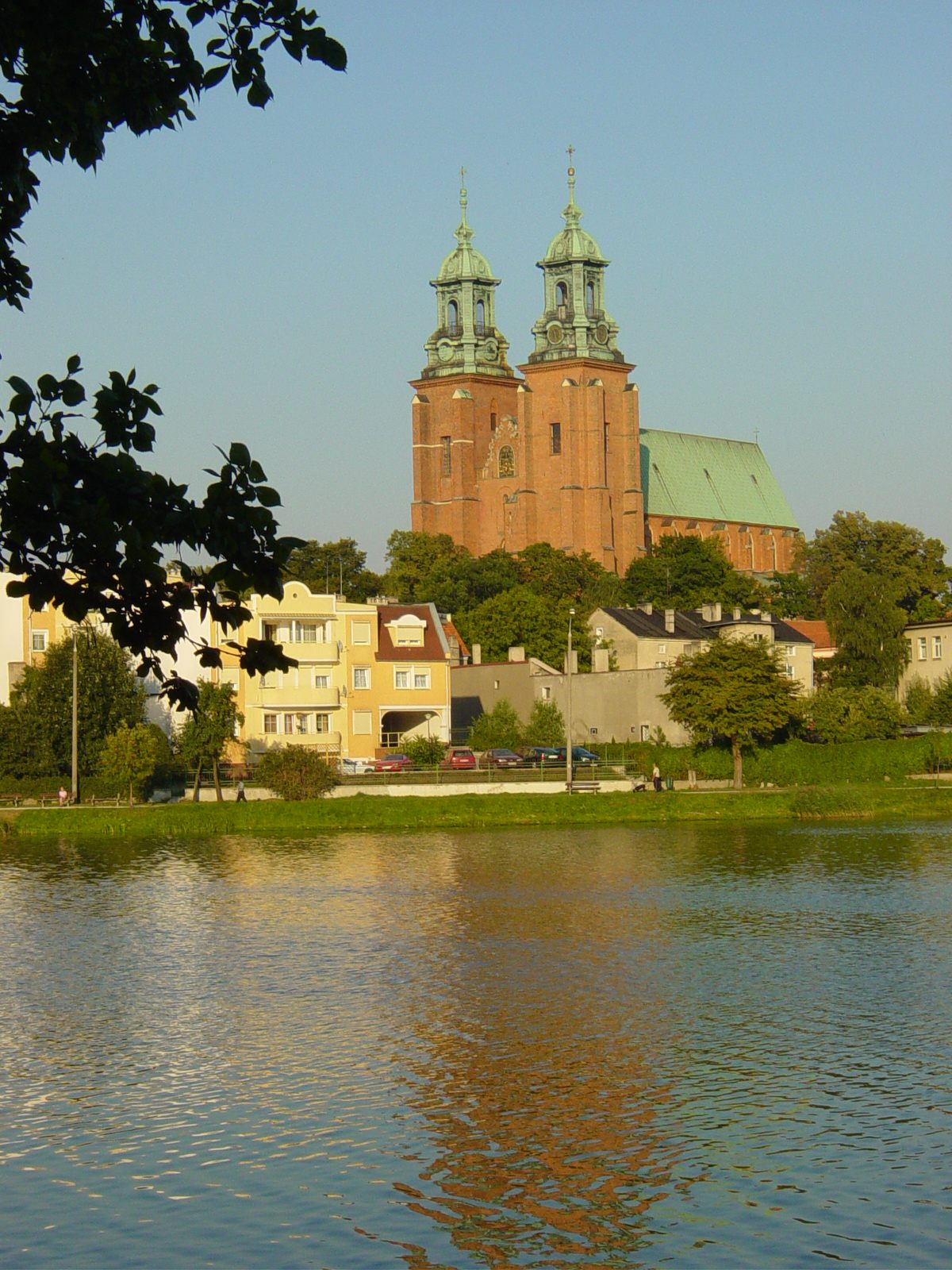
Gniezno Cathedral where Wincenty was Archbishop

Henry Kietlicz died on 22 March 1219 and two contenders emerged for the Bishops role, Hugo and Boguchwała. Pope Honorius III rejected both and suggested Iwo Odrowąż, the Archbishop of Kraków. However, he held office for about a year.

Support of Wawrzyniec/Lawrence, Bishop of Wrocław, two papal legates, and dukes Henry the Bearded and Wladyslaw Laskonogiego caused the pope on 5 October 1220 to select Wincenty as archbishop. However, as he had only been a secular cleric, he was ordained and consecrated bishop before taking the office of archbishop.

== Works as Archbishop ==
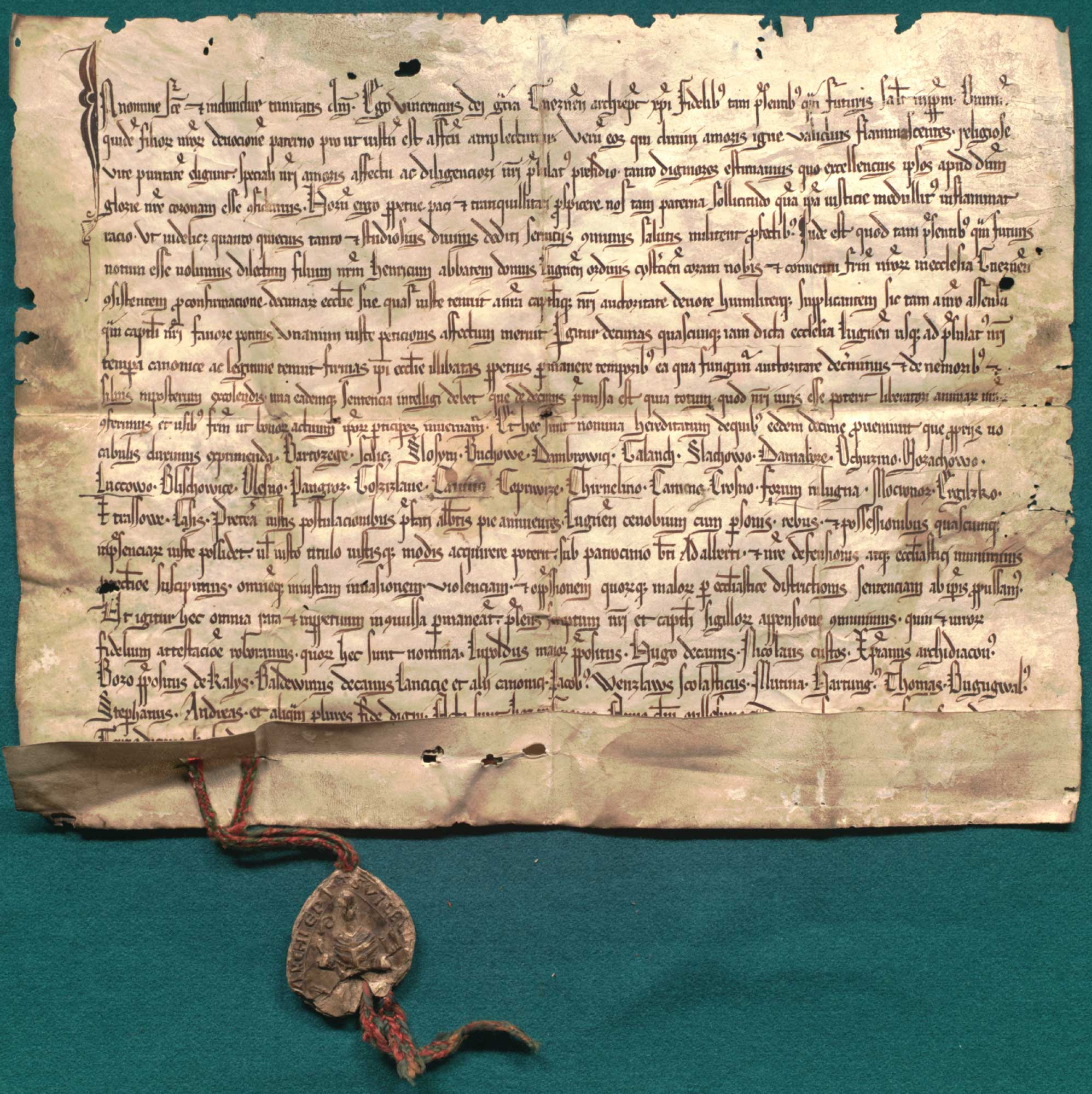
Charter of Wincenty

During the famine of 1222–1224 gave food to the needy and in 1223 he received papal legate Cardinal Gregorio Crescenzi. In 1226 he chaired a synod to settle a dispute between the Archbishop of Kraków and Wawrzyniec, Bishop of Wrocław. He also participated in the convention in Gąsawa following the death of Leszek the White in 1227.

Wincenty of Niałka died in early 1232 after a long and serious illness.

Religious titles
Preceded by Henryk Kietlicz	Archbishop of Gniezno; 1220 - 1232	Succeeded by Fulko I
