= Pełka (archbishop of Gniezno) =

His Excellency Pełka
- Archbishop of Gniezno
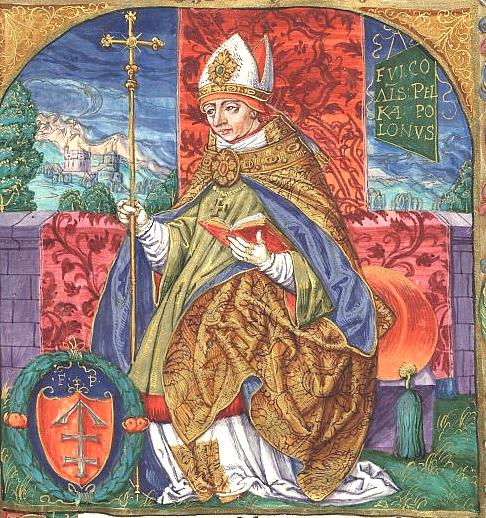
- Church: Roman Catholic
- Archdiocese: Gniezno
- Installed: 1232
- Term ended: 1258
- Predecessor: Wincenty Niałek
- Successor: Janusz z Tarnowa

Personal details
- Born: unknown
- Died: 5 April 1258
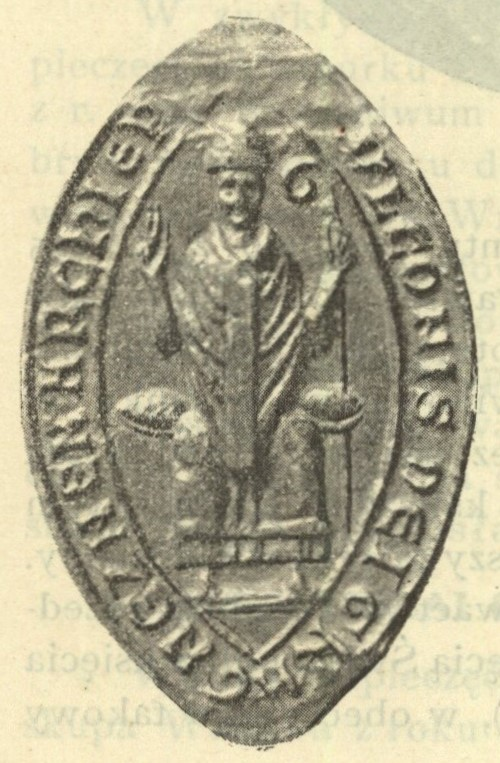
- Coat of arms

Pełka or Fulko (died 5 April 1258, in Łęczyca) was the Archbishop of Gniezno, Poland in 1232–1258.

Neither the date nor the place of his birth are known, although he was probably born in Lesser Poland. The 14th-century historian Jan Długosz claimed that he was from the knightly Lis family. Shortly after his birth his father joined the priesthood, which led to rumors about his illegitimate birth. But a commission appointed by Pope Honorius III dismissed these claims.

The date of Pełka's consecration as Archbishop of Gniezno is sometimes given as 26 June 1235. As Archbishop, Pełka continued the reforms initiated by Henryk Kietlicz and supported a centralised monarchy rather than the fragmented state. He continued the role of arbitrator between the Piast claimants to the throne. In 1234, he was an arbitrator in a dispute between Henry the Bearded and Wladyslaw Odonic of Wielkopolskie.

Pełka, like his predecessor Henryk Kietlicz, was also a defender of Church rights. He supported Thomas I, Bishop of Wrocław, in his dispute with Henry the Bearded.

He was involved in church politics. In 1238, Pope Gregory IX allowed the wearing of the cross metropolitan and he probably participated in the 1245 deliberations of the Council of Lyon and in 1253 he consecrated the first bishop of Lithuania, Dominican friar Wit (Vitas). He also oversaw the canonisation of Stanislaus of Szczepanów in 1253.

In 1256, the Holy See confirmed metropolis status to Gniezno.

Pełka died 5 April 1258, in Łęczyca and was buried in the Gniezno Cathedral. A commission was appointed by Pope Innocent IV to examine the life of Pełka with a view to canonisation.

Religious titles
Preceded by Wincenty Niałek	Archbishop of Gniezno ca. 1232 – 1258	Succeeded by Janusz z Tarnowa
