= Władysław Aleksander Łubieński =

Primate of Poland from 1759 to 1767

His Excellency Władysław Aleksander Łubieński
- Archbishop of Gniezno; Primate of Poland
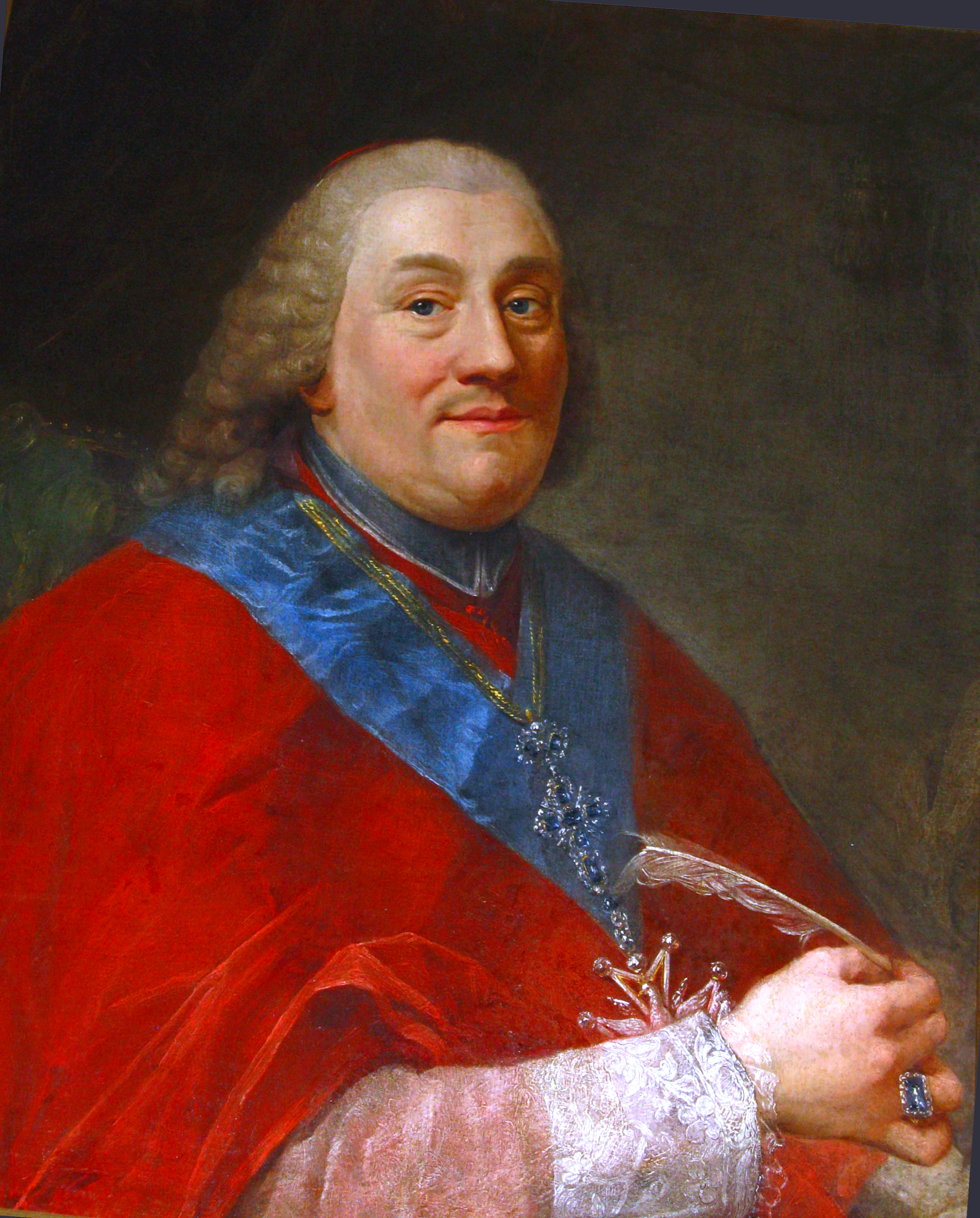
- Portrait of Łubieński on oil, made in the 1760s
- Church: Roman Catholic
- Archdiocese: Gniezno
- Installed: 8 May 1763
- Term ended: 21 June 1767
- Other post: Interrex (1763–64)
- Previous post: Archbishop of Lwów (1758–59)

Orders
- Ordination: 1727 by Teodor Andrzej Potocki
- Consecration: 7 May 1758 by Adam Ignacy Komorowski

Personal details
- Born: 1 November 1703
- Died: 21 June 1767 (aged 63)
- Education: Krakow Academy; Roman College
- Coat of arms

Władysław Aleksander Łubieński (1 November 1703 – 21 June 1767) was archbishop of Lwów (1758–59) and primate of Poland (1759–1767). He was an ally of the Czartoryski Familia and of the Russian Empire and an opponent of religious tolerance. He acted as interrex in 1763–1764, after the death of King Augustus III of Poland and prior to the election of Stanisław August Poniatowski as king of the Polish–Lithuanian Commonwealth.

== Early life and ecclesiastical career ==
Łubieński was born on 1 November 1703 to Maciej (a member of a szlachta family that held the Pomian coat of arms) and Marianna Łubieński (née Stokowska). He was baptized on 11 November that same year. He was first educated at a Jesuit college in Kalisz, then at the diocesan seminary in Łowicz, before matriculating to the Kraków Academy in the winter of 1722, where he studied theology and canon law. He then traveled to Rome in 1724, where he continued his theological studies at the Roman College. Afterwards, he went on a journey throughout western Europe — visiting Italy, France and the Holy Roman Empire — and recording his travels in a detailed diary, the manuscript for which was later destroyed in World War II.

Upon his return to Poland, Łubieński joined the court of Teodor Andrzej Potocki, becoming his secretary and prelate; he was also installed as a canon of the cathedral chapter at Gniezno on 29 December 1726. He was consecrated a priest by Potocki at Gniezno Cathedral in 1727; he was then appointed coadjutor scholastic of Kraków by his uncle, Andrzej Łubieński, after celebrating his first mass, though he wouldn't be installed to the position until 3 September 1729. He was appointed on 26 August 1728 to serve as the provost of the collegiate church at Łask, granting him the right to use a mitre. After his uncle's death in 1730, he succeeded him as the scholastic of Kraków; he also served as vice president of the Crown Tribunal from that year until 1731.

On 5 August 1742, Łubieński was installed as dean of the cathedral chapter at Gniezno; he also held various prebendaries and benefices throughout this period, including his appointment on 12 April 1752 as custodian of the cathedral chapter at Sandomierz. After he helped Heinrich von Brühl secure a loan of 800,000 złoty, von Brühl repaid him by assisting in his appointment to the position of Archbishop of Lwów, to which he was appointed on 27 November 1757. Having retained his prebendaries in Paradyż and Sandomierz after his appointment, he arranged for one of his relatives, Maciej Józef Łubieński, to succeed him as dean of Gniezno. He was preconized by Pope Benedict XIV on 13 April 1758 and consecrated by Adam Ignacy Komorowski (assisted by Antoni Sebastian Dembowski and Kajetan Sołtyk) on 7 May of the same year; he was formally installed at Lwów on 3 August 1758. He was also appointed to the Order of the White Eagle on the day of his installation. He used his position as Archbishop to issue proclamations denouncing the disorder in the Sejm, while also calling for judicial & economic reform and military auctions.

In the midst of a tour of the cathedral at Lwów and its respective chapter, Łubieński was informed of the death of Adam Ignacy Komorowski and of his summons to Warsaw; he wouldn't return to the city after this summons. 9 days after Komorowski's death, on 11 March 1759, he was nominated to be the next archbishop of Gniezno. He was formally elected by the cathedral chapter at Gniezno on 29 March, preconized by Pope Clement XIII on 9 April, and assumed control of the Archdiocese at Łowicz in May of that year. However, he did not step foot in the Archdiocese, and instead had Maciej Józef Łubieński administer the Archdiocese in his absence. In spite of his absence, Łubieński founded a printing press at Łowicz, from which he published his pastoral letters, and renovated Gniezno Cathedral in 1765, including installing a high altar and renovating prebendal stalls, with the cathedral's chapter ordering to include the Pomian coat of arms on the stalls as a symbol of gratitude for the renovations. He had also previously donated 210,777 złoty from his estate and coffers to repair the Cathedral after it had caught on fire in 1760.

== Political career ==
Łubieński began his political career in 1740 as a delegate for the cathedral chapter of Kraków, accompanying Jan Aleksander Lipski to a session of the Sejm. This session ran between 3 October–13 November 1740, where he offered a sermon at a votive Mass held at St. John's Cathedral in Warsaw. Once this session of the Sejm was broken up, he was appointed either by Lipski or Augustus III to serve as Great Scribe of Lithuania; though he informally held this post as soon as the session was ended, he was only formally nominated to the post on 21 May 1742. Around the same time, he compiled the Świat we wszystkich swoich częściach, considered the "first general geographic [document] in the Polish language" and later used as a textbook for Augustus III's sons to learn Polish. Łubieński presented Świat before Augustus III on 3 December 1740, and as a result he remained in the royal court for a span of 16 years.

At the royal court, Łubieński belonged to faction opposing the Czartoryski familly and the Familia. After attempting to reconcile the Potocki family with the court in 1743, and in the wake of the disruption of the 1744 session of the Sejm, he began secret negotiations with Józef Wandalin Mniszech and Antoni Michał Potocki to form a Potocki confederation; when the Czartoryskis were to form their own such confederation, the Potockis ould have Augustus III form a confederated sejm, auction off the treasury and army, and in the process remove the Familia from power. While this plan was originally approved by the king and by von Brühl, the latter would eventually leak the plan to Andrzej Stanisław Załuski, who severely criticized the plan. This resulted in Łubieński's attempt to run for the position of deputy chancellor of the crown failing, with the king instead appointing and granting a "lesser seal of approval" to Michał Wodzicki, a candidate supported by the Familia, in 1746. Nonetheless, Łubieński continued to work against the Familia; working alongside Jan Małachowski, he fought against the Czartoryski family in the 1754 case surrounding the Ostrogski fee tail, which saw the royal court break from the Czartoryskis and the Familia.

After Augustus III's death in 1763, Łubieński was designated interrex, and thus would come to serve as the coronator of Augustus III's successor, Stanisław August Poniatowski. Historian Emanuel Rostworowski notes that in this position, he appointed his family to serve as ambassadors and envoys to Russia, the Papal States, France, and Spain. He also disputed with the papal nuncio to Poland, Antonio Eugenio Visconti, who sympathized with the Familia's opponents and forwarded a proposal to the Holy See that would strip Łubieński of his right to appoint, and crown, the next king.

In spite of his early opposition to the Czartoryskis and the Familia, Łubieński came to fall under their influence after the court's distancing from Russian influence after the death of Elizabeth of Russia. With the assistance of Andrzej Stanisław Młodziejowski — Łubieński's auditor-general at the time and one of his most trusted officials, who had been recruited by the Russian Empire to serve on their behalf — Łubieński fell under the influence of the Czartoryski family and Hermann Karl von Keyserling, the Russian ambassador to Warsaw. Further attempts were made in October 1763, amidst the upcoming regal election, when von Keyserling offered 80,000 rubles to offset Łubieński's expenses as a result of his position, though Łubieński declined and stated he would not take the offer until after the election was completed. Besides this bribe, furs worth 4,500 rubles were sent to him in November; ultimately, according to Rostowski, it isn't known how much these payments swayed him, as the Commonwealth had already allotted a sum of money totalling 200,000 złoty for his expenses. Regardless of how much these bribes might've swayed him, and following the wishes of the Familia, Łubieński opted to delay the election sejm until May 1764. The ensuing deliberations also saw his actions guided by the Familia and monitored by Młodziejowski, who "reportedly communicated with him through sign language and, when necessary, ran to the throne and whispered in [Łubieński]'s ear," as recorded by Rostowski.

Regnal titles
Vacant Title last held by Teodor Andrzej Potocki	Interrex; 1763–1764	Partition of Poland
Catholic Church titles
Preceded by Mikołaj Dembowski	Archbishop of Lwów; 1758–1759	Succeeded by Wacław Hieronim Sierakowski
Preceded by Adam Ignacy Komorowski	Archbishop of Gniezno; Primate of Poland; 1759–1767	Succeeded by Gabriel Podoski
