= Jan Joachim Tarło =

Polish bishop

Jan Joachim Tarło (November 30, 1658 – August 13, 1732, in Vienna) was a Polish clergyman and bishop for the Roman Catholic Diocese of Poznań. He became ordained in 1719. He was appointed bishop in 1718. He died in 1732.

Jan Joachim Tarło was son of Jan Aleksander Tarło and Anna Czartoryska. His uncle was Kazimierz Florian Czartoryski, archbishop of Gniezno.

He was born on November 30, 1658, and baptized on December 26, 1658. There is no consensus among authors where he was born. According to some authors the place of his birth was Wadowice, but according to others he was born in Sandomierz Voivodeship. Tarło could be born in Wadowice Górne, which was in Sandomierz Voivodeship.

Preceded by Piotr Tarło	Bishop of Poznań; 1722–1732	Succeeded by Stanisław Józef Hozjusz
