= Zdzisław I =

His Excellency Zdzisław I
- Archbishop of Gniezno
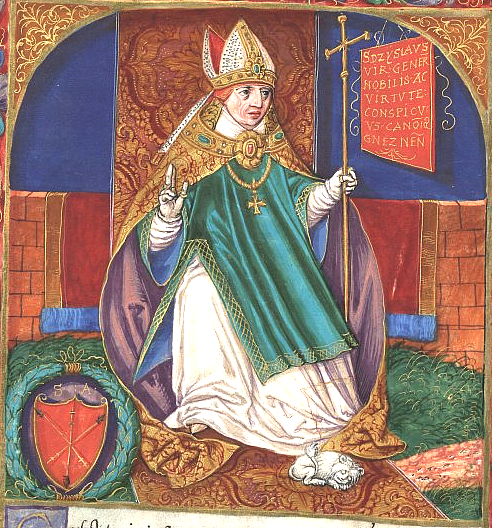
- Church: Roman Catholic
- Archdiocese: Gniezno
- Installed: before 1177
- Term ended: after 1180
- Predecessor: Jan Gryfita
- Successor: Bogumilus

Personal details
- Born: unknown
- Died: unknown
- Coat of arms

Zdzisław I (d. between 1180 and 1185) was a 12th-century Archbishop of Gniezno, Poland.

He was Archbishop from before 26 April 1177 till after 28 March 1181.

He is mentioned in a documented on April 26, 1177, as a witness for the Lubiąż Abbey. He presided over an assembly at Easter 1179 and the Convention of the Polish bishops and barons organised by Casimir II the Just in 1180. He is mentioned in a Bull of Pope Alexander III dated March 28, 1181. The date of his death is not known but was probably in the 1180s.

== See also ==
- The Gniezno Doors may have been installed in his time.

Religious titles
Preceded by Janik	Archbishop of Gniezno c.1177 - 1181	Succeeded by Bogumilus
