= Janusz Tarnowa =

Polish bishop

His Excellency Janusz z Tarnowa
- Archbishop of Gniezno
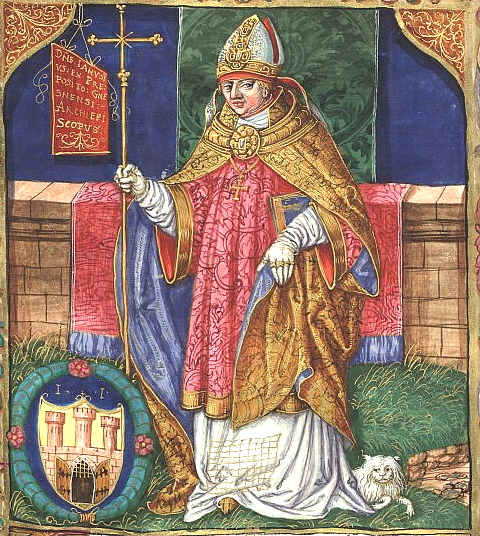
- Church: Roman Catholic
- Archdiocese: Gniezno
- Installed: 1258
- Term ended: 1271
- Predecessor: Pełka
- Successor: Martin of Opava

Orders
- Consecration: 2 March 1259

Personal details
- Born: unknown
- Died: 25 August 1271

Janusz z Tarnowa was Archbishop of Gniezno, Poland.

He was appointed Archbishop 20 May 1258 and he died in office 1271. Brave, educated and well versed in political matters, he skilfully ruled the Archdiocese in the troubled and difficult times of the second invasion of the Tatars, and the Lithuanian pillaging of Mazowsze.

Little is known of his life. Jan Długosz maintains that he was from Grzymałów, but this remains un-established, as is the hypotheses he belonged to the Knights of Tarnawów's.

A trusted official and collaborator for 20 years, of Pełka, he was unanimously supported as his replacement and was appointed archbishop on 20 May 1258. One of the most momentous events of his tenure was the canonization in 1266 of Jadwiga Śląska by Pope Urban IV and as Archbishop he convened several provincial councils.

Historians do not agree on the date of his death but it was probably 1271 or 1272.

Religious titles
Preceded by Fulko I	Archbishop of Gniezno c.1258 - 1271	Succeeded by Martin of Opava
