= Jan Lipski =

Roman Catholic archbishop (1589-1641)

- Archbishop of Gniezno; Primate of Poland
- Church: Catholic Church
- In office: 1638–1641

Personal details
- Born: 1589 Lipie
- Died: 13 May 1641 (aged 51–52) Lyszkowice, Poland

POL COA Łada

Jan Lipski (Count Jan VIII Lipski) of Łada coat of arms (1589–1641) was a bishop of Chełmno (1636–1639), crown referendary and Archbishop of Gniezno and Primate of Poland (from 1639).

== Early life ==
In 1589, Lipski was born in a noble family (szlachta).

== Career ==
Lipski chose an ecclesiastical career. He held several important posts at the court of Polish king Zygmunt III Waza and his wife Constance of Austria, later at the court of Władysław IV Waza.

In 1636, Lipski was ordained as bishop of Chełmno in Poland. In 1638, Lipski became an archbishop of Gniezno in Poland.

In 1637, Lipski was sent by king Władysław to Vienna to escort his future wife, Cecylia Renata. At that time Emperor Ferdinand of the Holy Roman Empire gave him the title of count.

== Personal life ==
On May 13, 1641, Lipski died in his palace in Łyszkowice; it was rumored that he was poisoned by the Protestants.

Catholic Church titles
Preceded by Jakub Zadzik	Bishop of Chełmno; 1636–1639	Succeeded by Kasper Działyński
Preceded by Jan VII Wężyk	Archbishop of Gniezno; Primate of Poland; 1639–1641	Succeeded by Maciej II Łubieński
