= Jakub of Żnin =

Polish archbishop

His Excellency Jakub of Żnin
- Archbishop of Gniezno
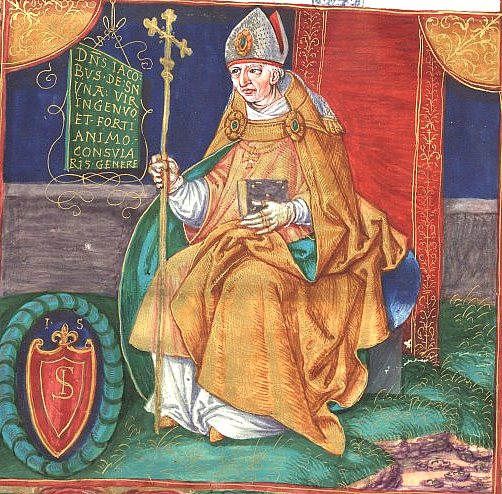
- 16th century illustration from the Catalogus Archiepiscoporum Gnesnensium
- Church: Roman Catholic
- Archdiocese: Gniezno
- Installed: before 1136
- Term ended: 1146/48
- Predecessor: Martin I
- Successor: Jan Gryfita

Personal details
- Born: 11th century
- Died: 23 September 1148

Jakub of Żnin (Polish: Jakub ze Żnina) was an early archbishop of Gniezno in Poland. He was archbishop from c. 1124 until 1148.

Although the twelfth century was a formative time for the Polish state, the historical records of the time are sparse and there is much that is not known about him.

It was during his time as Bishop that Innocent II issues a bull giving the metropolitan power over Poland to the Archbishopric of Magdeburg. This was annulled in 1136 when Innocent II restored as Gniezno with archbishop authority.

His death was recorded in the Lubiński obituary on the day of 23 September. On 7 July 1136 Pope Innocent II granted Archbishop Jacob twenty-nine villages in Pałuki and the town of Żnin, which also became property of the Roman Catholic Church.

Religious titles
Preceded by Marcin	Archbishop of Gniezno c.1124 - 1148	Succeeded by Janik
