= Sebastian Żydowski =

Polish Roman Catholic prelate

Most Reverend Sebastian Żydowski
- Auxiliary Bishop of Gniezno; Titular Bishop of Athyra
- Church: Catholic Church
- Archdiocese: Archdiocese of Gniezno
- In office: 1541–1560

Personal details
- Died: 1560

Sebastian Żydowski (Lidvinski) (died 1560) was a Roman Catholic prelate who served as Auxiliary Bishop of Gniezno (1541–1560).

== Biography ==
On 27 August 1541, Sebastian Żydowski was appointed during the papacy of Pope Clement VII as Auxiliary Bishop of Gniezno and Titular Bishop of Athyra. It is uncertain how long he served as Auxiliary Bishop of Gniezno.
