= Jan Stefan Wydźga =

Polish archbishop

His Excellency Jan Stefan Wydźga
- Archbishop of Gniezno; Primate of Poland
- Church: Roman Catholic
- Archdiocese: Gniezno

Personal details
- Born: 1610
- Died: 1685 (aged 74–75)
- Coat of arms

Jan Stefan Wydżga (c.1610 – 6 September 1685) was a Polish priest and historian. He was Archbishop of Gniezno and Primate of Poland (1679-1685). He was born in the Lviv, and was pastor of the Lviv cathedral chapter in 1641. He was Bishop of Łuck in the years 1655-1659, Bishop of Warmia 1659-1679, Grand Chancellor Crown Deputy Chancellor, Chancellor of the Queen of Poland, Ludwika Maria Gonzaga in 1652, Abbot of Sieciechów in 1647. As a senator, he was present at the Seyms: 1659, 1661, 1662, 1664/1665, 1666 (I), 1668 (III), 1672 (I) and 1674 (II) [4].
