= Martin of Opava =

Czech medieval chronicler (died 1278)

His Excellency Martin of Opava
- Archbishop of Gniezno
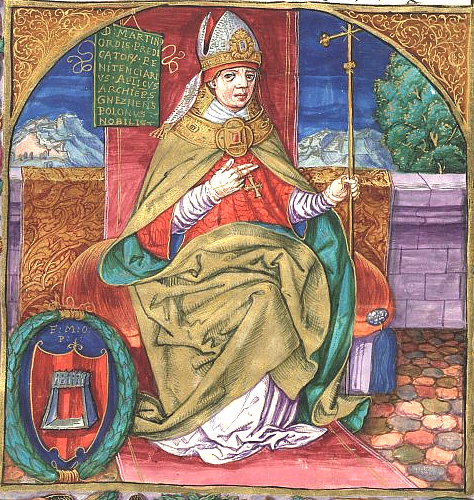
- Church: Roman Catholic
- Archdiocese: Gniezno
- Installed: 1278
- Term ended: 1278
- Predecessor: Janusz z Tarnowa
- Successor: Jakub Świnka

Orders
- Consecration: 2 March 1259

Personal details
- Born: 1215–1220
- Died: 1278 Bologna
- Coat of arms: Martin of Opava's coat of arms

Martin of Opava, O.P. (died 1278) also known as Martin of Poland (Latin: Martinus Oppaviensis, Martinus Polonus, German: Martin von Troppau), was a 13th-century Dominican friar, bishop and chronicler.

== Life ==
Known in Latin as Frater Martinus Ordinis Praedicatorum (Brother Martin of the Order of Preachers), he is believed to have been born, at an unknown date, in the Silesian town of Opava, at that time part of the Margraviate of Moravia.

From the middle of the 13th century, Martin was active in Rome as confessor and chaplain for Pope Alexander IV and his successors, Urban IV, Clement IV, Gregory X, Innocent V, Adrian V and John XXI (d. 1277), the last pope to appear in his chronicles. On 22 June 1278, Pope Nicholas III, while in Viterbo, appointed him archbishop of Gniezno.

While travelling to his new episcopal see, Martin died in Bologna, where he was buried at the Basilica of San Domenico, near the tomb of the founder of his Order.

== Works ==
Martin's Latin chronicle, the Chronicon pontificum et imperatorum, was written for the Dominican curia, and also for use in the new universities. It is mostly derivative in content and is therefore of limited value to modern historians. However, its importance is in the way the material is presented, which is a quantum leap forward in didactic method. The genius lies in its layout: each double page covers fifty years with fifty lines per page. The left-hand pages give the history of the papacy, with one line per year, and the right-hand pages give the history of emperors. Von den Brincken explains: "The chronicle was not strictly annalistic in the sense that every line contains the events of precisely one year; rather, the account of each ruler starts on the line representing the year of succession, and continues in free prose until it has filled the number of lines represented by the length of the reign." This makes for a more discursive text, while keeping the two accounts broadly parallel. This was a revolutionary approach in graphic design, which was not appreciated by all his contemporaries: many manuscripts simply copy the text without retaining the page layout, which results in a flowing text that jumps rather chaotically between popes and emperors. The chronicle was enormously influential; over 400 manuscripts are known, and the influence on many dozens of later chroniclers is palpable. Translations were made into many medieval vernaculars, including Middle English, as well as an Old French translation by Sébastien Mamerot in the late 15th century. Martin's Chronicon is the most influential source for the legend of "Pope Joan". It was also a source for Rashid al-Din Hamadani's Jami al-Tawarikh.

His other works include the Promptuarium Exemplorum.
