= Mikołaj Mściwy =

Polish Roman Catholic prelate

Most Reverend Mikołaj Mściwy
- Auxiliary Bishop of Gniezno; Titular Bishop of Athyra
- Church: Catholic Church
- Archdiocese: Archdiocese of Gniezno
- In office: 1509–?

Personal details
- Died: 1526

Mikołaj Mściwy (d. 1526) was a Roman Catholic prelate who served as Auxiliary Bishop of Gniezno (1509–?).

== Biography ==
On 1 Apr 1509, Nicolaus Msczny was appointed during the papacy of Pope Julius II as Auxiliary Bishop of Gniezno and Titular Bishop of Athyra. It is uncertain how long he served as Auxiliary Bishop of Gniezno. While bishop, he was the principal co-consecrator of Jakub von Salza, Bishop of Wrocław (1521).
