= Wawrzyniec (bishop of Wrocław) =

Polish bishop (died 1232)

Laurentius (Latin: Laurentius miseratione divina Wratislaviensis episcopus; also known as Lawrence or German Lorenz; Polish Wawrzyniec; died 7 June 1232) was Bishop of Wrocław from 1207 to 1232.

Little is known about his early life or origin. After the death of Bishop Cyprian, Laurentius was elected and consecrated Bishop of Wrocław in 1207. His consecration was performed by Archbishop Henry Kietlicz of Gniezno in the Benedictine monastery of Ołobok.

Laurentius participated in several provincial synods (including those of Głogów in 1208, Borzykowa in 1210, Mstów in 1212, and Trzebnica in 1219) and is said to have attended the Fourth Council of the Lateran in 1215. As a collaborator of the Gniezno metropolitan, he supported the implementation of the Gregorian Reform in the diocese. On 25 August 1219 he consecrated the monastery church of Trzebnica, founded by Duke Henry the Bearded and Hedwig of Andechs.

During his episcopate, the Wrocław cathedral chapter gained the right to elect the bishop and to administer the diocese during vacancies. The number of canons was fixed, and the archdeaconries of Głogów and Opole were established. The Premonstratensian nuns’ monastery at Rybnik was relocated to Czarnowanz near Opole. Additional foundations and settlements under his episcopate included the collegiate church of Głogów, the Augustinian canons’ monasteries at Kamenz and Naumburg am Bober, and the Dominican settlement in Wrocław.

On episcopal lands, particularly in the Ottmachau and Neisse region, Laurentius actively promoted the high-medieval Ostsiedlung (German eastward settlement) by supporting the foundation of new settlements and towns under German law (ius Theutonicum). He founded the town of Neisse before 1223, which later became the centre of the prince-bishopric territory; the foundation of Ziegenhals is also attributed to him. His insistence on the collection of tithes on newly cleared land and on episcopal jurisdiction occasionally led to conflicts with Duke Henry the Bearded, who had granted settlers certain freedoms to encourage colonization. Despite these tensions, the episcopal estates were expanded through grants from the Silesian Piast dukes.

Lawrence died 7 June 1232 and was interred in Lubiąż.

Religious titles
Preceded by Cyprian	Bishop of Wrocław; 1207–1232	Succeeded by Thomas I
