= Jan Chrzciciel Bużeński =

Polish Roman Catholic prelate

Most Reverend Jan Chrzciciel Bużeński
- Auxiliary Bishop of Gniezno; Titular Bishop of Halmiros
- Church: Catholic Church
- Archdiocese: Archdiocese of Gniezno
- In office: 1667–1674

Orders
- Consecration: 11 Sep 1667 by Tomasz Leżeński

Personal details
- Died: 1674

Jan Chrzciciel Bużeński (died on 1674) was a Roman Catholic prelate who served as Auxiliary Bishop of Gniezno (1667–1674).

On 7 Mar 1667, Jan Chrzciciel Bużeński was appointed during the papacy of Pope Alexander VII as Auxiliary Bishop of Gniezno and Titular Bishop of Halmiros. On 11 Sep 1667, he was consecrated bishop by Tomasz Leżeński, Bishop of Lutsk, with Stefan Wierzbowski, Bishop of Poznań, and Mikołaj Oborski, Titular Bishop of Laodicea in Syria, serving as co-consecrators.

== See also ==
- Catholic Church in Poland
