= Juliusz Józef Dinder =

Polish-German Bishop

His Excellency Julius Dinder
- Archbishop of Gniezno; Primate of Poland
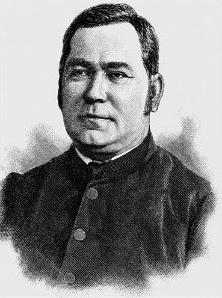
- Church: Roman Catholic
- Archdiocese: Gniezno
- Diocese: Gniezno
- Installed: 1886
- Term ended: 1890

Personal details
- Born: 9 March 1830 Reszel
- Died: 30 May 1890 (aged 60) Poznań
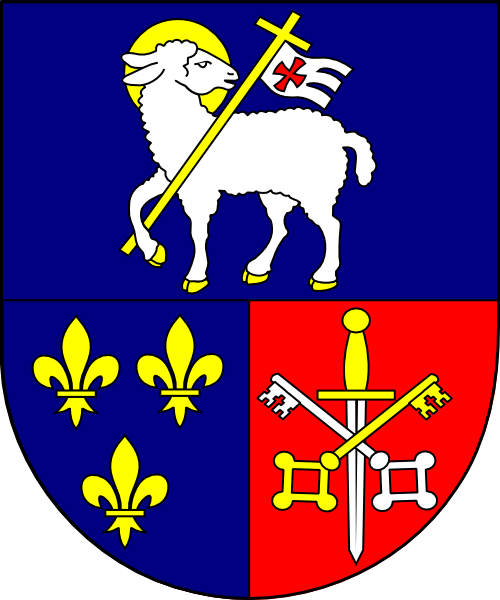
- Coat of arms

Julius Joseph Dinder (9 March 1830 - 30 May 1890) was a German Bishop of the Roman Catholic Church, and Archbishop of Poznań and Gniezno, and the Primate of Poland in the years 1886- 1890.

== Early life ==
He was born in Rößel, Ermland in East Prussia (modern Reszel, Warmia, Poland). He studied Theology in the Lycaeum Hosianum in Braunsberg and was ordained on June 8, 1856. he was a vicar in Bischofsburg, then a pastor in Grieslienen, working among Ermland's / Warmian Catholics, where he learned the Polish language. In 1868, he was made a pastor of the parish in Königsberg in Prussia, ranked provost at the provostry church there, and was appointed Dean of Samland, and honorary canon of Ermland.

== Rise to Primate ==
He was the first non-Polish Primate of Poland in several hundred years. His rise to the office was at the promotion of Otto von Bismarck, who wanted a German in the role, as part of his Germanisation-politics. Bismarck put pressure on the Vatican to appoint Dinder. Pope Leo XIII, decided not to exacerbate a conflict with the German Empire.

His appointment was opposed by the polish Chancellor and the majority of the clergy.

== Career as Primate ==
Dinder was an appointment of the German Emperor, and supported pro-German policies. However, in 1888 he asked the clergy to abstain from all political statements. Poland that this time was not a state and he encouraged the use of German in schools instead of Polish. He also appointed several German priests, however in what could be seen as a conciliatory action did appoint Prussian Poles Joseph Cybichowski as vicar-general, Edward Likowski as Bishop of Poznań and Jan Korytkowski as assistant in Gniezno (Gnesen).

== Latter life ==
He died in Posen on 30 May 1890. "Kurier Poznański" wrote of him "everything you did, had a sense of Justice and kindness, which indeered him in hearts and minds".
