= Jan Busiński =

Polish Roman Catholic prelate

Most Reverend Jan Busiński
- Auxiliary Bishop of Gniezno; Titular Bishop of Athyra
- Church: Catholic Church
- Archdiocese: Archdiocese of Gniezno
- In office: 1527–1541

Personal details
- Died: 20 January 1541 Gniezno, Poland

Jan Busiński (died on 20 January 1541) was a Roman Catholic prelate who served as Auxiliary Bishop of Gniezno (1527–1541).

== Biography ==
On 11 Jan 1527, Jan Busiński was appointed during the papacy of Pope Clement VII as Auxiliary Bishop of Gniezno and Titular Bishop of Athyra. He served as Auxiliary Bishop of Gniezno until his death on 20 January 1541.
