= Janik (archbishop of Gniezno) =

Polish bishop

Jan Gryfita
- Archbishop of Gniezno
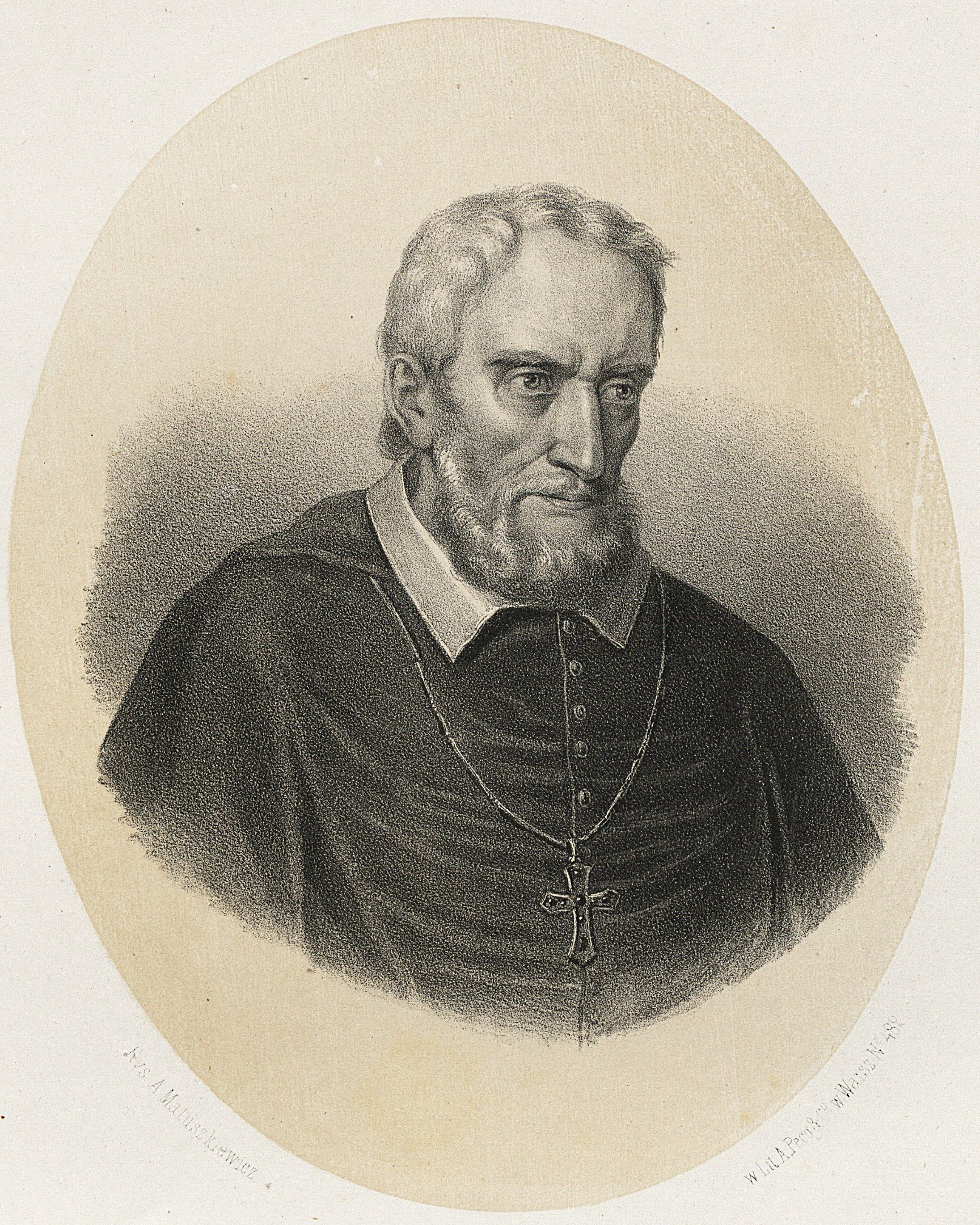
- 19th-century illustration by Alfons Matuszkiewicz
- Church: Roman Catholic
- Archdiocese: Gniezno
- Installed: 1149
- Term ended: after 1167
- Predecessor: Jakub ze Żnina
- Successor: Zdzisław I

Personal details
- Died: 1167

Jan Gryfita (first name also spelled Janik or Janisław, ? - 1167 or 1176) was an archbishop of Gniezno (1149 – c. 1167) and bishop of Wrocław (1146 – 1149). Together with his brother Klemens, he was a co-founder of the Cistercian Abbey of Jędrzejów. He was likely the patron and fundator of the Gniezno Doors.

Religious titles
Preceded by Jakub	Archbishop of Gniezno; 1149 - c. 1167	Succeeded by Zdzisław I
