= João de Oliveira Matos Ferreira =

His Most Reverend Excellency Venerable D. João de Oliveira Matos Ferreira
- Auxiliary Bishop of Guarda
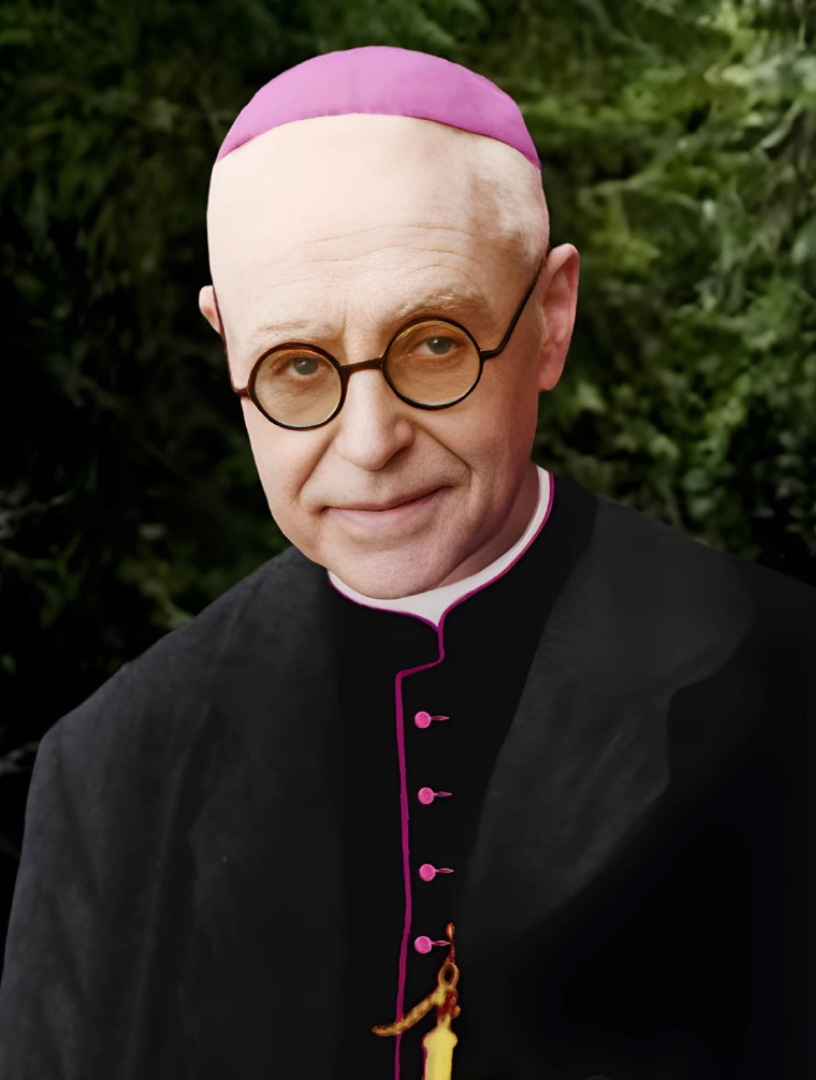
- Church: Roman Catholic Church
- Diocese: Guarda
- See: Guarda
- Appointed: 11 December 1922
- Term ended: 29 August 1962
- Other post: Titular Bishop of Aureliopolis in Lydia (1922–62)
- Previous post: Apostolic Visitor of Guarda (1920–23)

Orders
- Ordination: 28 March 1903
- Consecration: 25 July 1923 by José Alves Matoso
- Rank: Bishop

Personal details
- Born: João de Oliveira Matos Ferreira; 1 March 1879 Valverde, Fundão, Castelo Branco, Portugal
- Died: 29 August 1962 (aged 83) Guarda, Portugal

Sainthood
- Venerated in: Roman Catholic Church
- Title as Saint: Venerable
- Attributes: Episcopal attire

João de Oliveira Matos Ferreira (1 March 1879 – 29 August 1962) was a Portuguese Roman Catholic prelate and bishop who served in Guarda from his appointment in 1922 until his death. He was also the founder of the League of the Servants of Jesus.

The process for his beatification led on 3 June 2013 to Pope Francis declaring him Venerable as recognition of his life of heroic virtue. The pope must approve one miracle attributed to him in order for him to be beatified; one such case is now under investigation.

== Life ==
João de Oliveira Matos Ferreira was born on 1 March 1879 in Portugal to Antonio de Oliveira Matos Ferreira. He had four brothers and one of those brothers was a priest.

He was ordained to the priesthood on 28 March 1903 and served as a personal assistant to the Archbishop of Braga. From 1920 to 1923 he was the Apostolic Visitor of Guarda. He was appointed as a bishop in the Guarda diocese on 11 December 1922. He was also made a Titular Bishop at the same time and received his episcopal consecration in 1923. He also went on to establish the League of the Servants of Jesus.

Ferreira died on 29 August 1962.

== Beatification process ==
The beatification process commenced on 29 November 1993 in Guarda and the local process spanned from 1994 until 1998; the process was ratified on 13 November 1998. The Positio was then forwarded to the Congregation for the Causes of Saints in Rome in 2008.

Pope Francis approved his life of heroic virtue and proclaimed him to be Venerable on 3 June 2013.

A miracle attributed to him was investigated and the process of investigation closed at the beginning of 2010. It was ratified on 19 November 2010.
