= Wola Wężykowa =

- Village
- Location within Poland
- Coordinates: 51°28′38″N 19°0′27″E
- Country: Poland
- Voivodeship: Łódź
- County: Łask
- Gmina: Sędziejowice

Wola Wężykowa [ˈvɔla vɛ̃ʐɨˈkɔva] is a village in the administrative district of Gmina Sędziejowice, within Łask County, Łódź Voivodeship, in central Poland.
