= Maciej Łubieński =

Polish primate

His Excellency Maciej Lubienski
- Archbishop of Gniezno; Primate of Poland
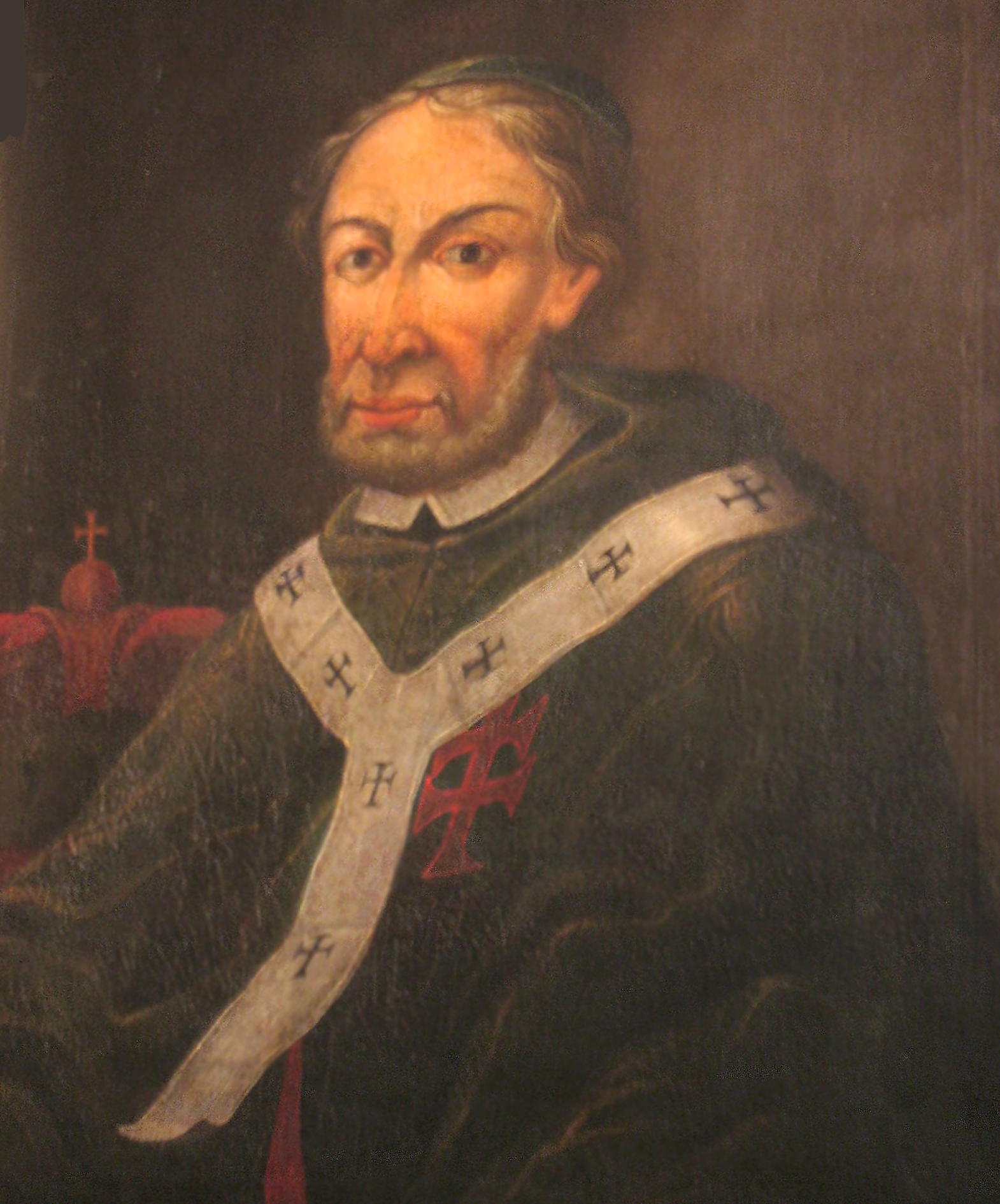
- Church: Roman Catholic
- Archdiocese: Gniezno
- Installed: 1641
- Term ended: 1652

Orders
- Ordination: 1602
- Consecration: 1620

Personal details
- Coat of arms

Maciej Łubieński (1572 in Łubna – 1652 in Łowicz), of Pomian coat of arms, was a primate of Poland, archbishop of Gniezno, bishop of Poznań, bishop of Kujawy and interrex in the Polish–Lithuanian Commonwealth.

He was educated in Sieradz, Kalisz, Poznań and Kraków. In 1641 he became the archbishop of Gniezno and primate of Poland. During the Chmielnicki Uprising in 1648, after the death of Polish king Władysław IV Waza he became the interrex and in 1649 he crowned Jan II Kazimierz as the king of Poland. He died in Łowicz in 1652, and he was buried in his family crypt in Łowicz.

Catholic Church titles
Preceded by Jan VIII Lipski	Primate of Poland; Archbishop of Gniezno; 1641–1652	Succeeded by Andrzej II Leszczyński
