= Adam Ignacy Komorowski =

Polish archbishop (1699–1759)

His Excellency Adam Ignacy Komorowski
- Archbishop of Gniezno; Primate of Poland
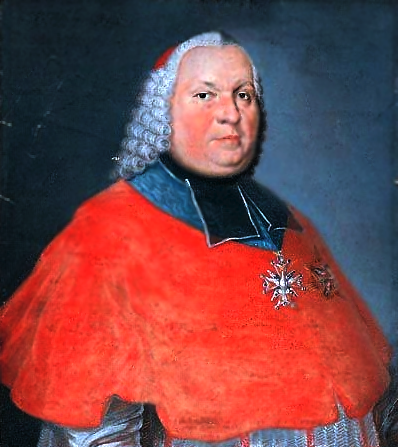
- Church: Roman Catholic
- Archdiocese: Gniezno
- Diocese: Gniezno
- Installed: 1749
- Term ended: 1759

Personal details
- Born: 24 May 1699 Trzeszozanica
- Died: 2 March 1759 (aged 59) Łódź Voivodeship
- Coat of arms

Adam Ignacy Komorowski of the Korczak coat of arms (24 May 1699 – 2 March 1759) was an archbishop of Gniezno, primate of Poland, provost of the Kraków cathedral chapter in 1737–1749, chancellor of the Krakow cathedral chapter in 1724–1737, archdeacon of the collegiate chapter of Nowy Sacz in 1729–1736, provost of the collegiate chapter of St. Michael at the Wawel Castle in 1743–1749, a canon of the collegiate chapter of the Tarnów prebend under the name of Dispatch of the Apostles until 1749, provost of the collegiate chapter of Pilica in 1733–1749, canon of the collegiate chapter of the Pilica prebend under the name of John the Baptist until 1726.

He died in 1759 in Łódź Voivodeship.
