= Kazimierz Florian Czartoryski =

Polish Catholic archbishop

His Excellency Kazimierz Florian Czartoryski
- Archbishop of Gniezno; Primate of Poland
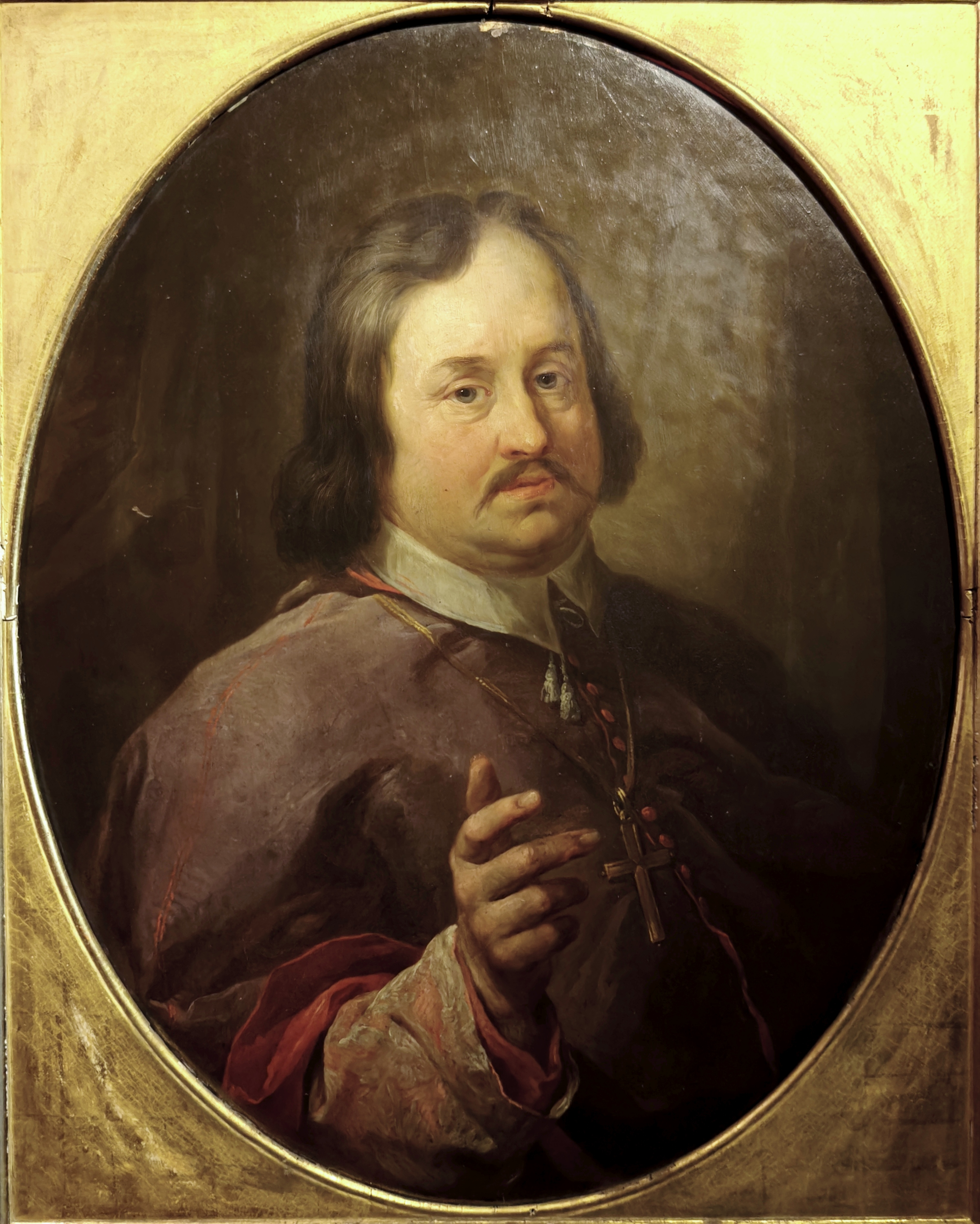
- Church: Roman Catholic
- Archdiocese: Gniezno
- Installed: 1673
- Term ended: 1674

Personal details
- Born: before 1620 Klewań
- Died: 1674 Warszawa
- Coat of arms

Kazimierz Florian Czartoryski was born before 1620 at Klevan the eldest son of Nicholas George Czartoryski and Isabella Korecka.

He obtained his doctorate in theology in Rome and was ordained to the priesthood. He was Secretary to King Władysław IV, in 1651, he was the Bishop of Poznań and in 1655 become Bishop of Kuyavia.

During the Swedish invasion (the Deluge) he took refuge with King Jan Kazimierz in Silesia, where he stayed until July 1657.

On 15 April 1673 after the death of primate Mikołaj Prażmowski he took over his office.

He died on 15 May 1674 at Warsaw, Poland.

His nephew was Jan Joachim Tarło, bishop of Poznań.
