= Jan Madaliński =

Polish Roman Catholic prelate

Most Reverend Jan Madaliński
- Auxiliary Bishop of Gniezno; Titular Bishop of Teodosia
- Church: Catholic Church
- Archdiocese: Archdiocese of Gniezno
- In office: 1640–1644

Personal details
- Born: 1589
- Died: 1644 (age 55) Gniezno, Poland

Jan Madaliński, O. Cist. (1589–1644) was a Roman Catholic prelate who served as Auxiliary Bishop of Gniezno (1640–1644).

== Biography ==
Jan Madaliński was born in 1589 and ordained a priest in the Cistercian Order. On 16 Apr 1640, he was appointed during the papacy of Pope Urban VIII as Auxiliary Bishop of Gniezno and Titular Bishop of Teodosia. He served as Auxiliary Bishop of Gniezno until his death in 1644. While bishop, he was the principal co-consecrator of Piotr Mieszkowski, Auxiliary Bishop of Włocławek (1643).
