= Jan Przerębski =

His Excellency Jan Przerębski
- Archbishop of Gniezno; Primate of Poland
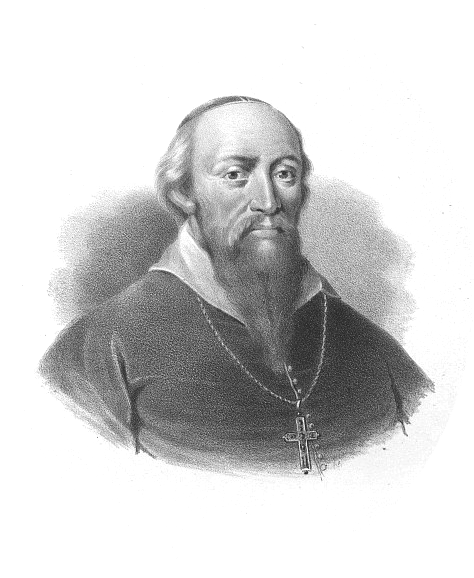
- Church: Roman Catholic
- Archdiocese: Gniezno
- Installed: 1559
- Term ended: 1562

Orders
- Ordination: unknown
- Consecration: 1557

Personal details
- Born: 1510
- Died: 12 January 1562 (aged 51–52) Łowicz
- Coat of arms

Jan Przerębski (born around 1519; died on 12 January 1562 in Łowicz) - from 1551 Crown Deputy Chancellors, Grand Secretary of the Crown from 1550, royal secretary, nominate as a Bishop of Chełmn (which he never took over), from 1559 the archbishop of Gniezno and the primate of Poland, provost of the collegiate chapter in Wieluń in 1557.

Przerębski was educated at the University of Padua.
