= Wojciech Baranowski =

Polish archbishop

His Excellency Wojciech Baranowski
- Archbishop of Gniezno; Primate of Poland
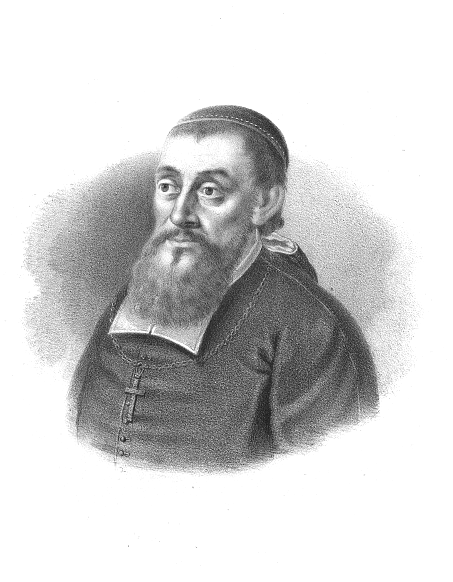
- Church: Roman Catholic
- Archdiocese: Gniezno

Personal details
- Born: 1548 Baranów
- Died: 1615 (aged 66–67)
- Coat of arms

Wojciech Baranowski (1548 – 23 September 1615) was archbishop of Gniezno and primate of Poland.

== Biography ==
In 1581 he was ordained a priest and became the royal secretary of Stefan Batory, accompanying him during the Pskov campaign. Later in 1581 he became grand secretary to the crown, and by 1585 he was the Crown Deputy Chancellor. In 1587 he signed a recession sanctioning the election of Sigismund III Vasa. Also in 1587, on behalf of the senate, he welcomed Zygmunt III's deputation on a ship in Gdańsk, insisting that he sign a pacta conventa containing a promise to join Estonia to the Polish–Lithuanian Commonwealth.

In 1589, he was a signatory to the ratification of the Bytom-Będzin Treaty at the pacification of Sejm. On 30 January 1591, he was appointed bishop of Płock. From 1595-1596 he worked on behalf of the king with Pope Clement VIII. On 14 May 1607 he was transferred to the Kujawsko-Pomorskie Diocese, and on 28 July 1608 he was appointed Archbishop of Gniezno.

Baranowski appreciated music; he was a composer, organist and conductor. He is buried in Gniezno Cathedral in the Baranowski Chapel, where he has the highest tombstone.
