= List of archbishops of Gniezno and primates of Poland =

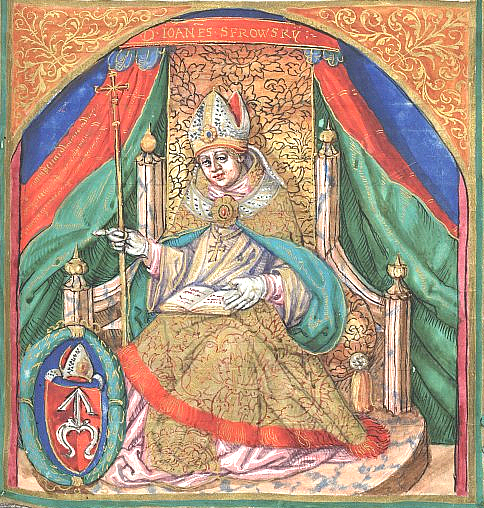
Jan Odrowąż (Sprowski)

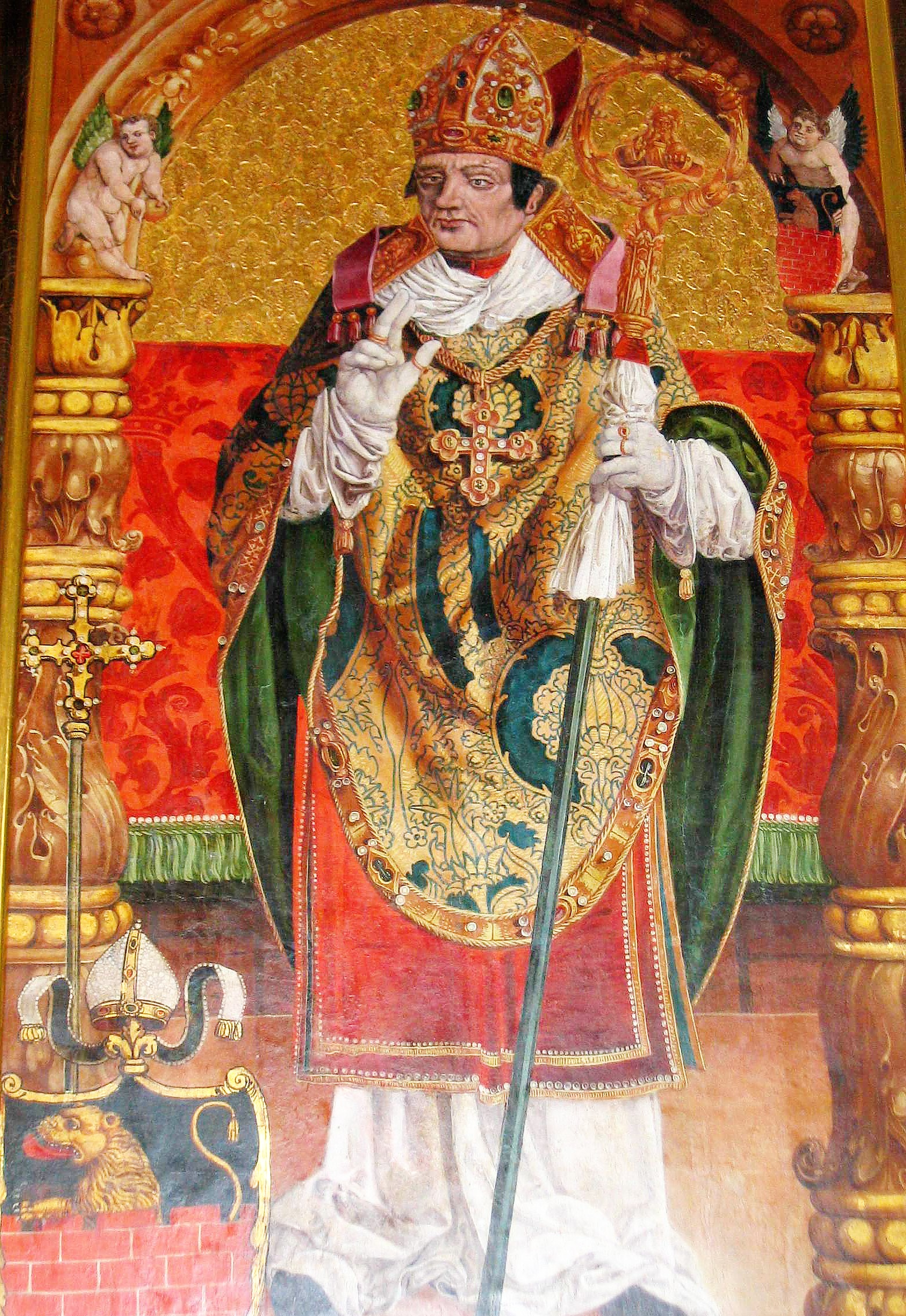
Jan Latalski

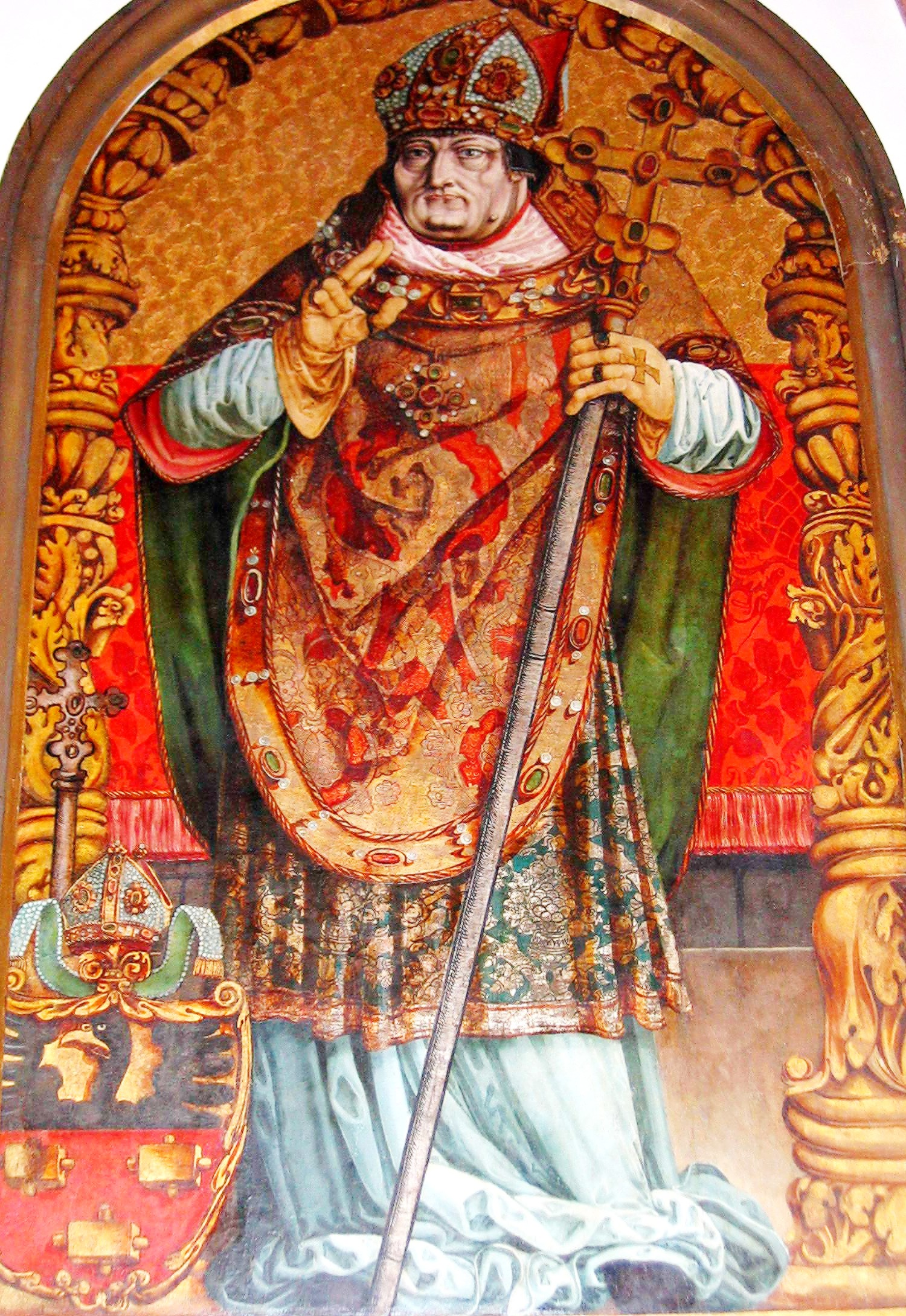
Piotr Gamrat

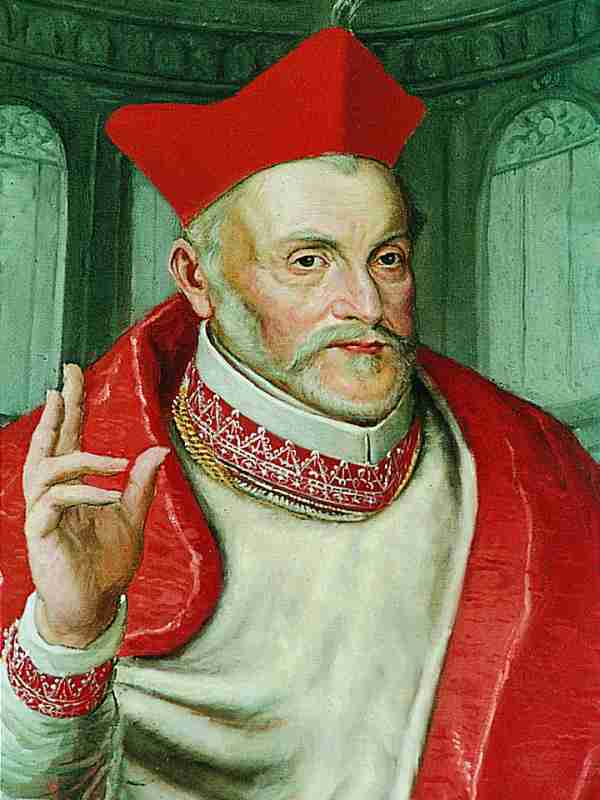
Bernard Maciejowski

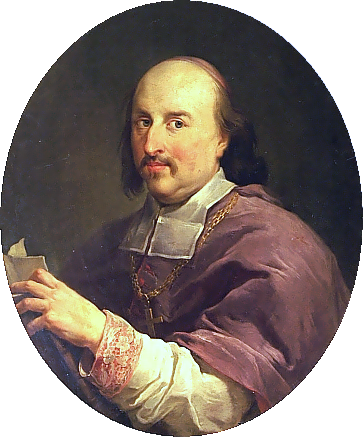
Andrzej Olszowski

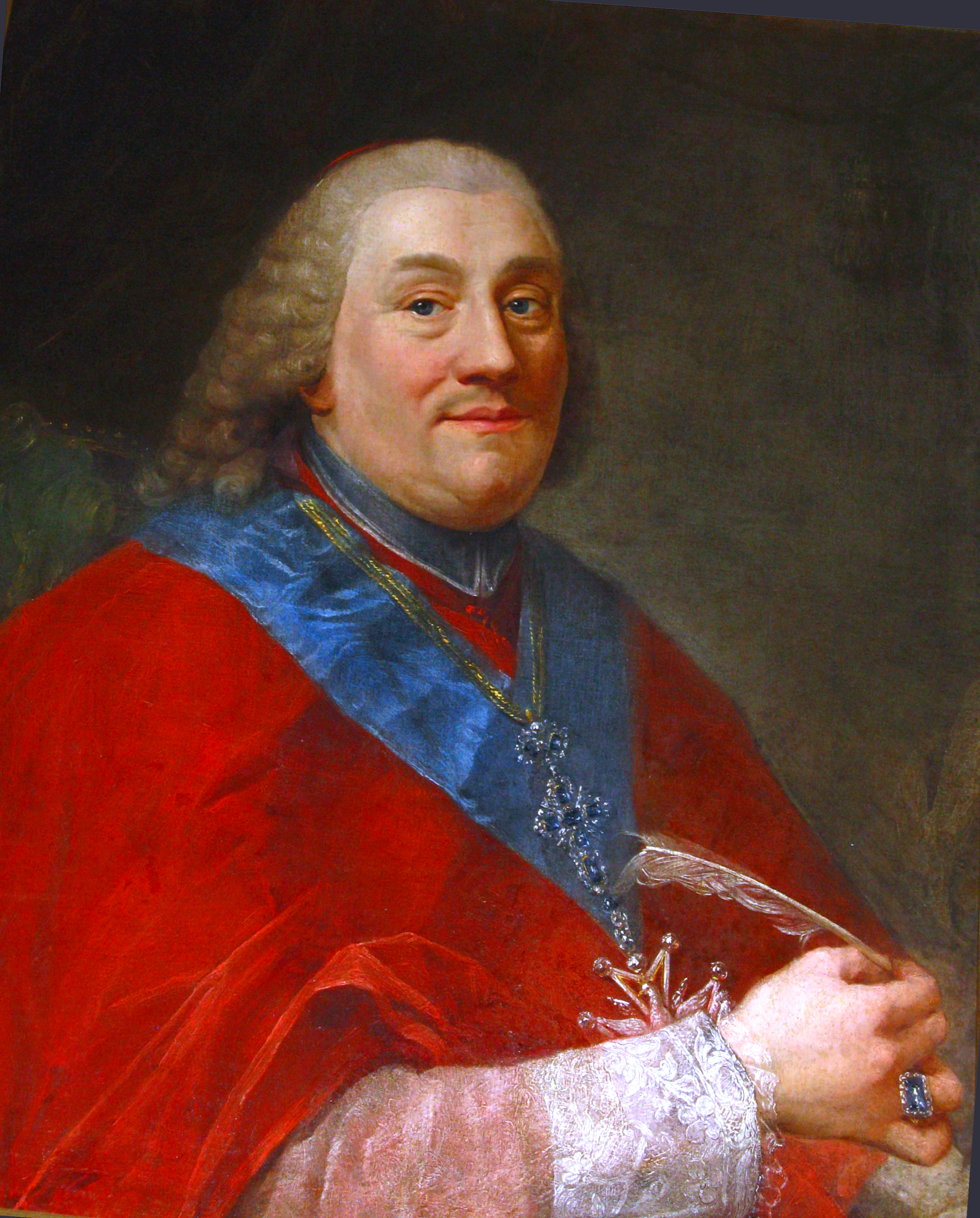
Władysław Łubieński

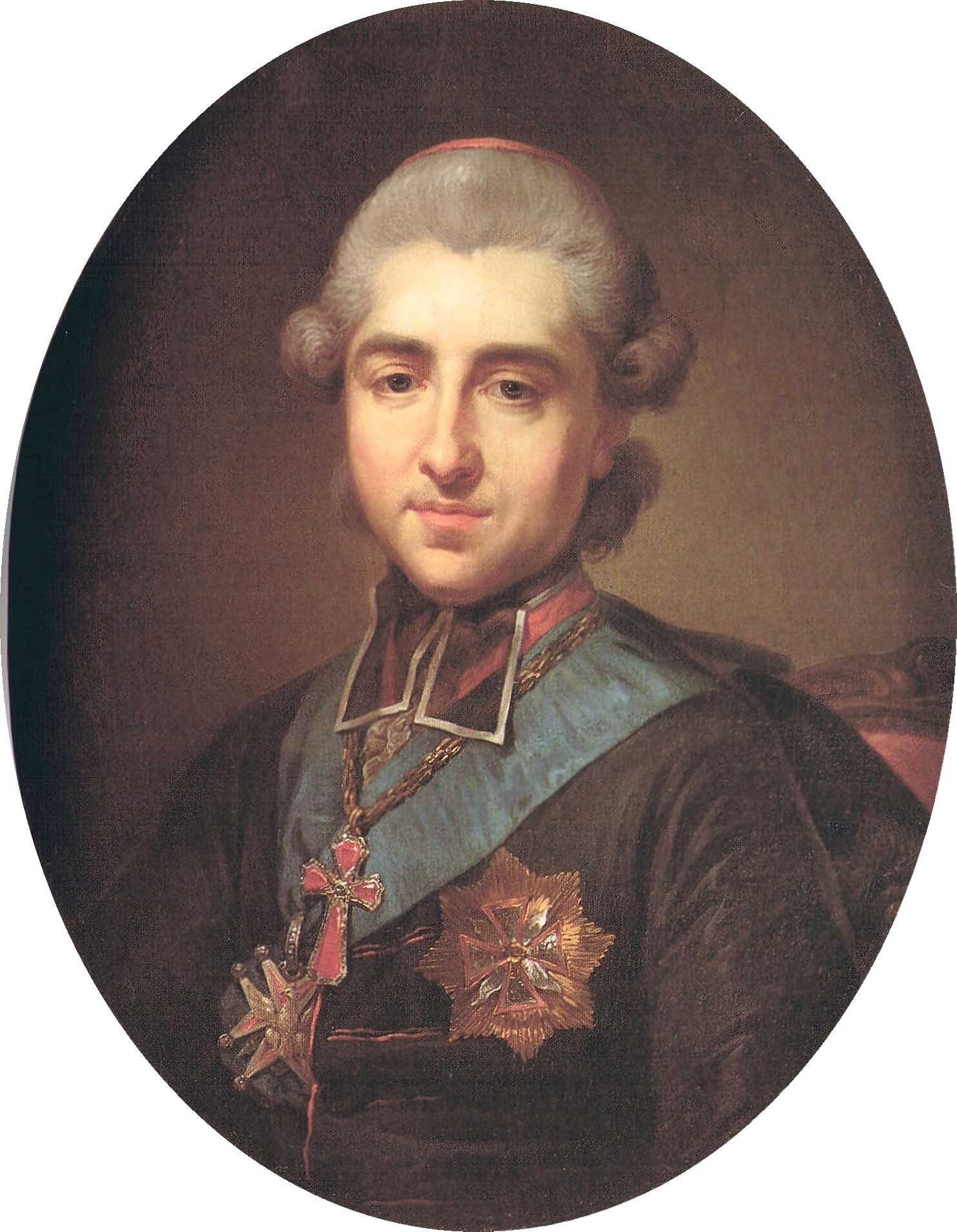
Michał Poniatowski

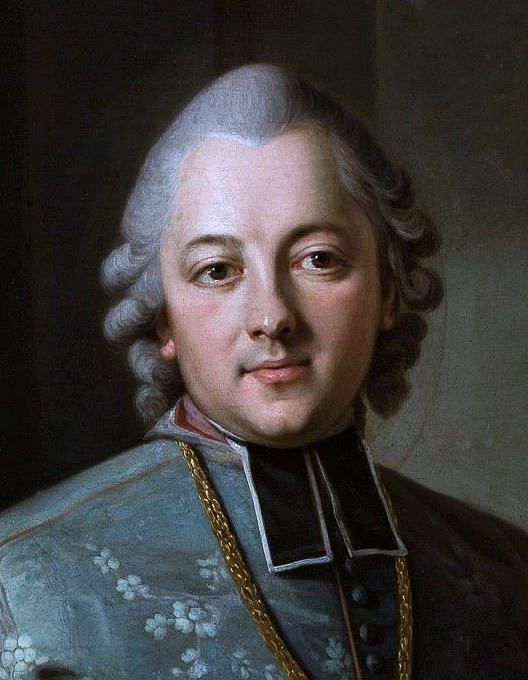
Ignacy Krasicki

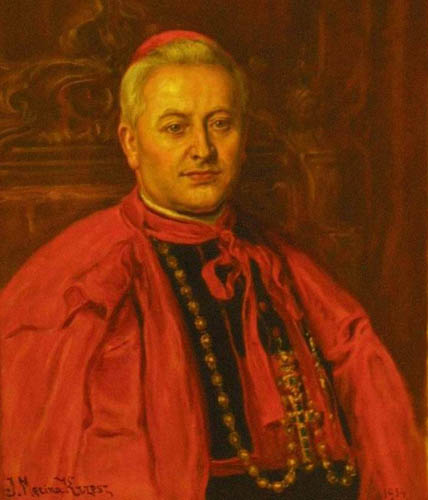
August Hlond

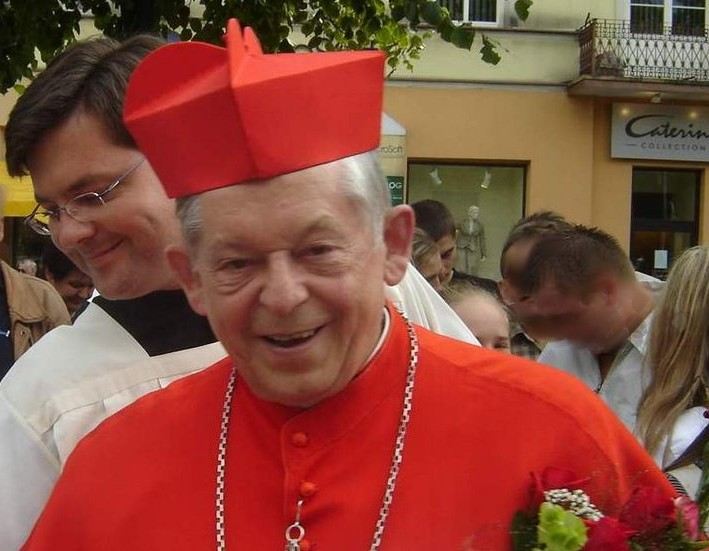
Józef Glemp

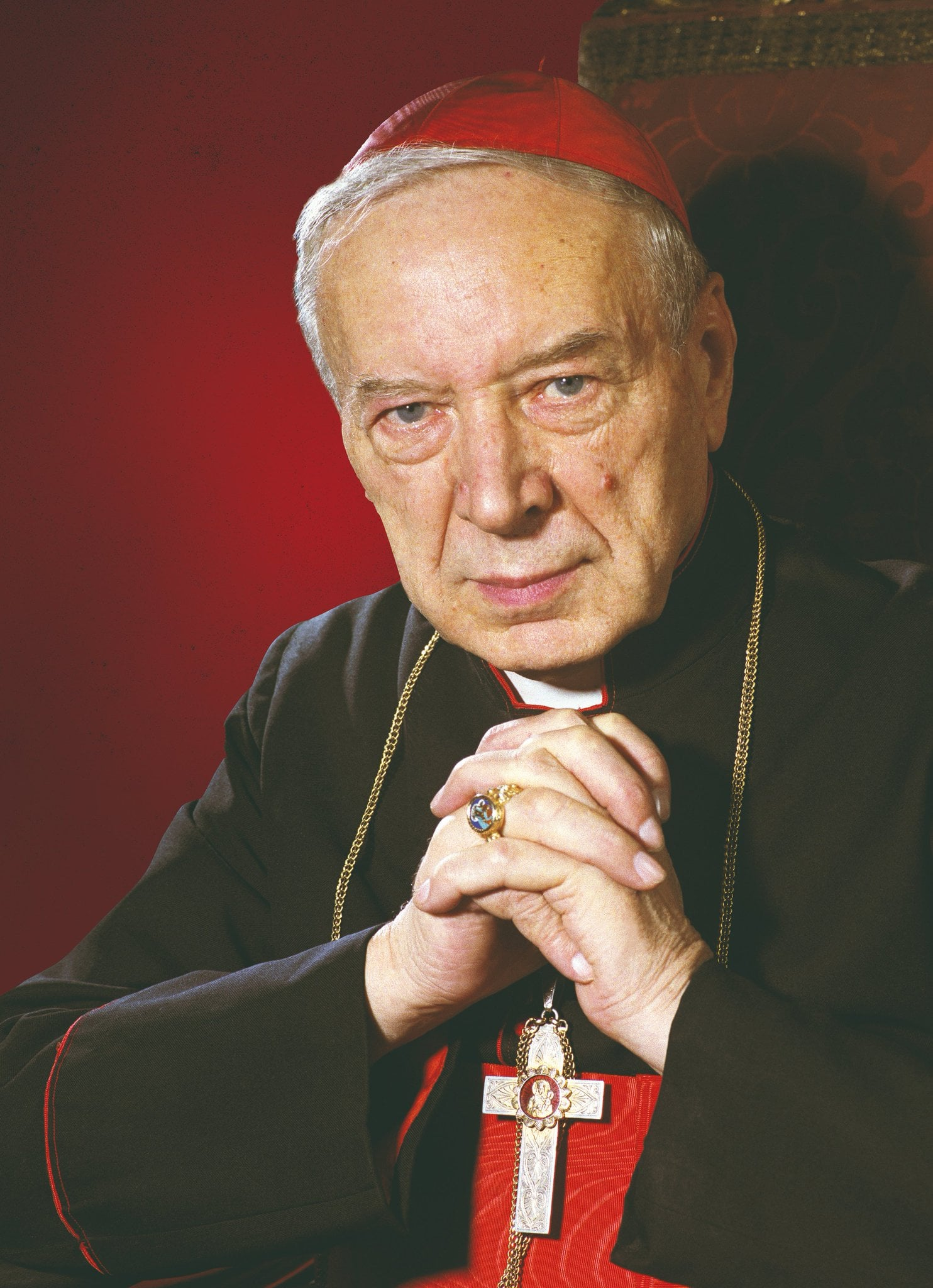
Stefan Wyszyński

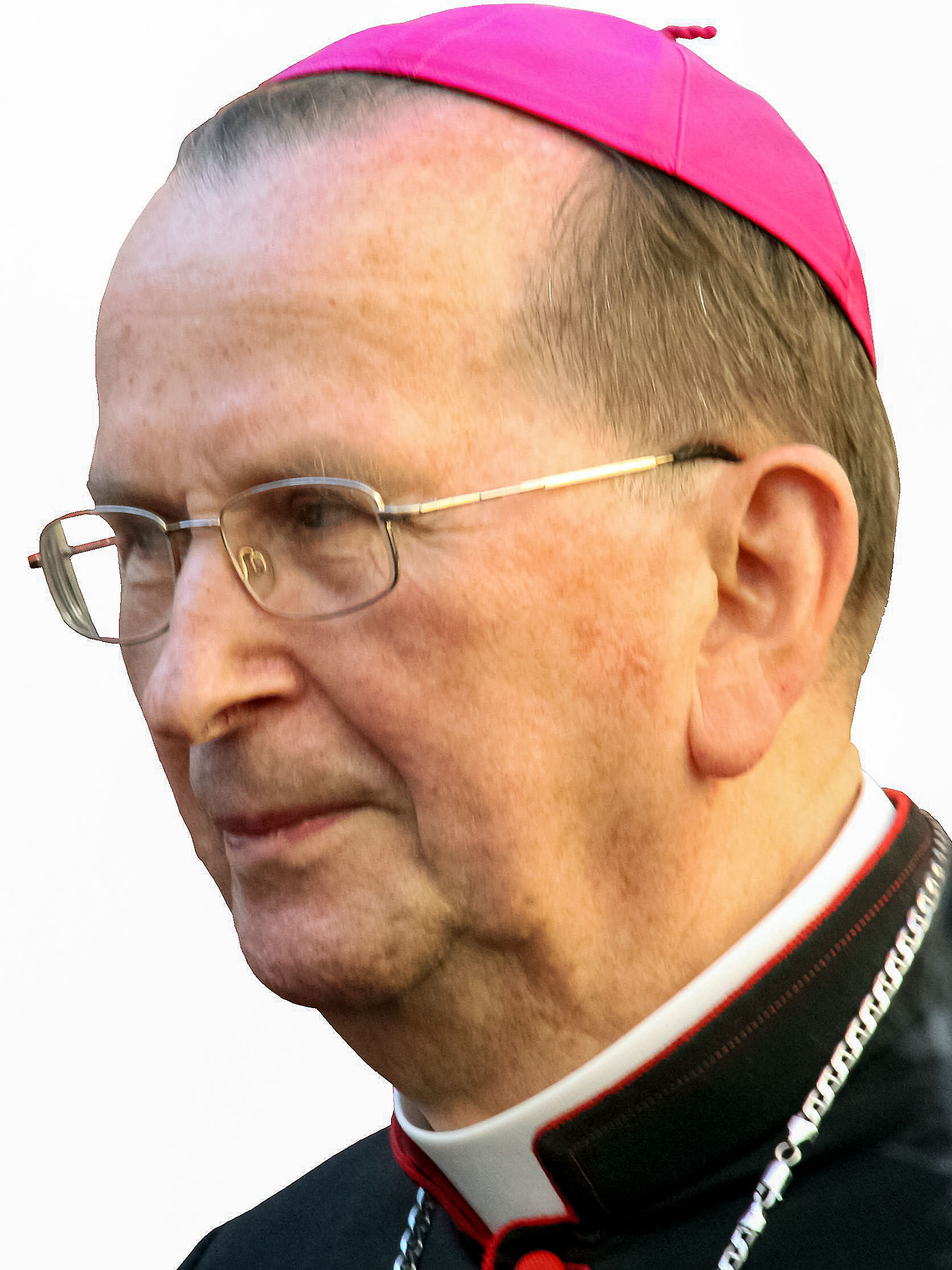
Henryk Muszyński

This is a list of archbishops of the Archdiocese of Gniezno, who are simultaneously primates of Poland since 1418. They also served as interrex in the Polish–Lithuanian Commonwealth.

- From 1821 until 1946 in personal union with the Archdiocese of Poznań.
- From 1946 until 1992 in personal union with the Archdiocese of Warsaw.

List of archbishops

- (999–after 1000) Radim Gaudentius
- (before 1025? – 1027) Hipolit
- 1027–1028 Bossuta Stefan
- 1076? – 1092 Bogumił
- ? Heinrich von Wülzburg
- (attested 1100 – 1112) Marcin
- (attested 1136 – 1146/1148) Jakub I ze Żnina
- (1149–after 1167) Jan Gryfita
- (attested 1177–1180) Zdzisław I
- (probably in 1180s) Bogumilus
- (attested from 1191 – died 1198/1199) Piotr Łabędź
- 1199–1219 Henryk Kietlicz
- 1220–1232 Wincenty Niałek
- 1232–1258 Fulko I
- 1258–1271 Janusz Tarnowa
- 1271–1278 vacant
- 1278 Martin of Opava
- 1278–1283 vacant
- 1283–1314 Jakub Świnka
- 1314–1316 vacant
- 1316–1317 Borzysław I
- 1317–1341 Janisław
- 1342–1374 Jarosław Bogoria
- 1374–1382 Janusz Suchywilk
- 1382–1388 Bodzęta z Kosowic
- 1389–1394 Jan Kropidło
- 1394–1401 Dobrogost z Nowego Dworu
- 1402–1411 Mikołaj Kurowski
- 1412–1422 Mikołaj Trąba (first primate of Poland since 1418)
- 1423–1436 Wojciech Jastrzębiec
- 1437–1448 Wincenty Kot
- 1449–1453 Władysław Oporowski
- 1453–1464 Jan Odrowąż from Sprowa
- 1464–1473 Jan Gruszczyński
- 1473–1480 Jakub Siemieński
- 1481–1493 Zbigniew Oleśnicki
- 1493–1503 Fryderyk Jagiellończyk
- 1503–1510 Andrzej Boryszewski
- 1510–1531 Jan Łaski (1456–1531)
- 1531–1535 Maciej Drzewicki
- 1535–1537 Andrzej Krzycki
- 1537–1540 Jan Latalski (Bishop of Gniezno)
- 1541–1545 Piotr III Gamrat
- 1546–1559 Mikołaj Dzierzgowski
- 1559–1562 Jan Przerębski
- 1562–1581 Jakub Uchański
- 1581–1603 Stanisław Karnkowski
- 1604–1605 Jan Tarnowski (1550–1605)
- 1606–1608 Bernard Maciejowski
- 1608–1615 Wojciech Baranowski
- 1616–1624 Wawrzyniec Gembicki.
- 1624–1626 Henryk Firlej
- 1627–1638 Jan Wężyk
- 1638–1641 Jan Lipski
- 1641–1652 Maciej Łubieński
- 1653–1658 Andrzej Leszczyński (1608–1658)
- 1659–1666 Waclaw Leszczyński
- 1666–1673 Mikołaj IV Prażmowski
- 1673–1674 Kazimierz Florian Czartoryski
- 1674–1677 Andrzej Olszowski
- 1677–1679 vacant
- 1679–1685 Jan Stefan Wydźga
- 1685–1688 vacant
- 1688–1705 Michał Stefan Radziejowski
- 1706–1721 Stanisław Szembek
- 1721–1723 vacant
- 1723–1738 Teodor Andrzej Potocki
- 1739–1748 Krzysztof Antoni Szembek
- 1749–1759 Adam Ignacy Komorowski
- 1759–1767 Władysław Aleksander Łubieński
- 1767–1777 Gabriel Podoski
- 1777–1784 Antoni Kazimierz Ostrowski
- 1785–1794 Michał Jerzy Poniatowski
- 1795–1801 Ignacy Krasicki
- 1801–1806 vacant
- 1806–1818 Ignacy Raczyński
- 1818–1821 vacant
- 1821–1825 Tymoteusz Paweł Gorzeński
- 1825–1828 vacant
- 1828–1829 Teofil Cyprian Wolicki
- 1829–1831 vacant
- 1831–1842 Marcin Sulgustowski–Dunin
- 1842–1845 vacant
- 1845–1865 Leon Michał Przyłuski
- 1866–1886 Mieczysław Halka Ledóchowski
- 1886–1890 Juliusz Józef Dinder
- 1891–1906 Florian Stablewski
- 1906–1914 vacant
- 1914–1915 Edward Likowski
- 1915–1926 Edmund Dalbor
- 1926–1948 August Józef Hlond
- 1948–1981 Stefan Wyszyński
- 1981–1992 Józef Glemp (Primate of Poland until 18 December 2009)
- 1992–2010 Henryk Muszyński (Primate of Poland from 18 December 2009)
- 2010–2014 Józef Kowalczyk
- 2014–present Wojciech Polak

== Auxiliary bishops ==
- 1469–1474 Anton Nicolai
- 1509–1526 Mikołaj Mściwy
- 1527–1541 Jan Busiński
- 1541–1560 Sebastian Żydowski
- 1608–1627 Andrzej Wilczyński
- 1628–1638 Andrzej Gembicki, Appointed Bishop of Lutsk
- 1640–1644 Jan Madaliński
- 1644–1658 Adrian Grodecki
- 1660–1665 Gaspar Trizenieski
- 1667–1674 Jan Chrzciciel Bużeński
- 1676–1693 Wojciech Stawowski
- 1694–1700 Konstantyn Józef Zieliński, Appointed Archbishop of Lviv
- 1699–1718 Stefan Antonin Mdzewski
