= Edward Likowski =

Polish Catholic hierarch

His Excellency Edward Likowski
- Archbishop of Gniezno, Primate of Poland
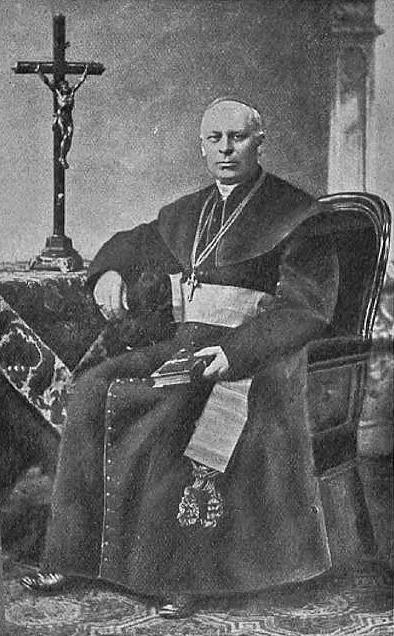
- Church: Roman Catholic
- Archdiocese: Gniezno
- Installed: 1914
- Term ended: 1915

Orders
- Ordination: 21 December 1861
- Consecration: 1 May 1887

Personal details
- Born: 26 October 1836 Września
- Died: 20 February 1915 (aged 78) Poznań
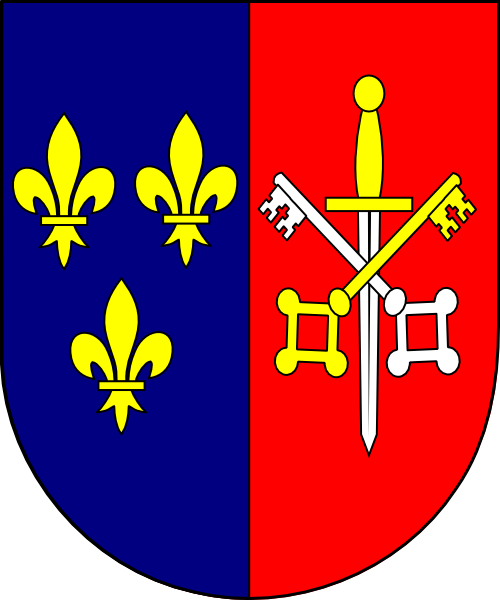
- Coat of arms

Edward Likowski (26 October 1836 – 20 February 1915) was a Polish Catholic hierarch, who served as the archbishop of Gniezno and primate of Poland from 1914 until his death in 1915.

== Biography ==
Likowski was born on 26 September 1836 in Wrzesnia. He gained a bachelor's in 1861 from Münster and was ordained a priest on 21 December 1861 in the diocese of Gniezno-Poznań. In 1881 he gained a doctorate in theological studies.

On 17 March 1887 he was appointed Auxiliary Bishop of Gniezno-Poznań and Titular Bishop of Aureliopolis in Lydia. He remained in this role until 13 August 1914 when he was promoted to Archbishop of Gniezno-Poznań and hence primate of Poland, filling the position that had been vacant for eight years.

He pursued many academic interests. He was a Church historian, Member of the Academy of Arts, and from 1895 to 1915 President of the Poznań Society of Friends of Science. He was also awarded an honorary Doctor from the Jagiellonian University in 1900.

He died in office on 20 February 1915.
