= Henryk Kietlicz =

His Excellency Henryk Kietlicz
- Archbishop of Gniezno
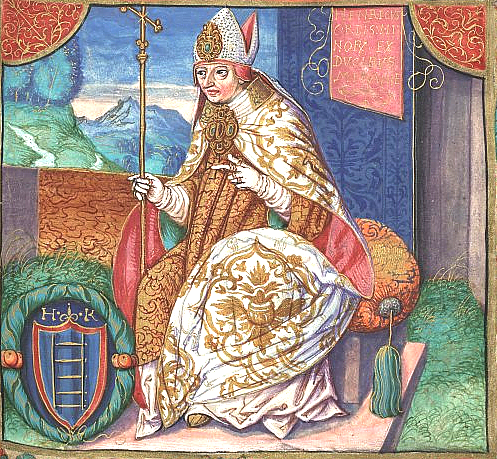
- Church: Roman Catholic
- Archdiocese: Gniezno
- Installed: 1199
- Term ended: 1219
- Predecessor: Piotr Łabędź
- Successor: Wincenty Niałek

Personal details
- Born: 1150
- Died: 22 March 1219 (aged 68–69)
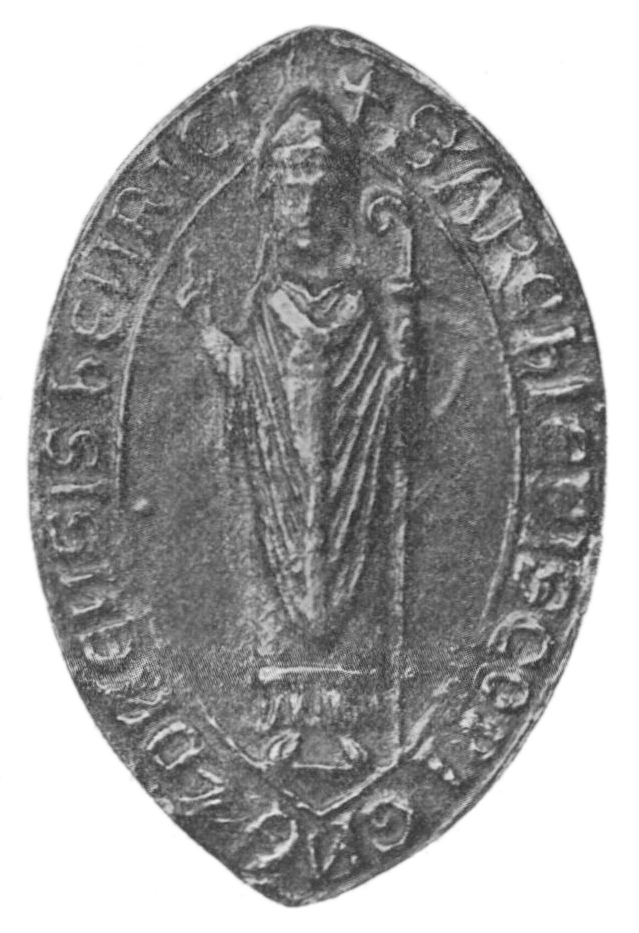
- Coat of arms

Henryk Kietlicz (1150 – 22 March 1219) was Archbishop of Gniezno from 1199 to 1219 was the main architect of the changes that allowed the Polish church to gain independence from the secular authorities.

Henryk was born in 1150 to a Czech family who moved to Silesia and then Poland. Jan Długosz claims he was the son of prince Theodoric Kietlicz, and Eudocia, the daughter of Duke Konrad I Mazowiecki. In his earlier life he was an administrator for Mieszko III. He became Archbishop in 1198 or 1199, and had political skills and influenced both the secular and church politics of his day.

He instigated a program of church reform which included the introduction of celibate clergy, the exclusion of clergy from the authority of secular courts and privileges in the selection of bishops. At the Synod of Borzykowa in June 1210 he gained church privileges including its own courts and tax exemptions, in exchange for his support in gaining the Pope's recognition of the King. Here he negotiated with Leszek the White, Konrad I Mazowiecki and Władysław Odonic to renounce jus spolii. These privileges were enshrined in a papal bull of 1211, and were confirmed and expanded at the Wolbórz Synod in 1216.

He attended Fourth Council of the Lateran in 1215, at which the mission to Prussia was approved and Henryk was made Papal legate to Prussia. Here he met with Innocent III who confirmed his support for Henryk's reforms.

At the synod of Wolborz in 1216 he gained further privileges for the church from Leszek I the White, Konrad of Masovia, Duke Wladyslaw and Casimir I of Opole. He then convened similar meetings in 1217 at Dańkowie and Sądowlu 1218, where a pact was formed between the Polish rulers.

Henryk was also active in secular politics, giving his support to the claims of Władysław Odonic over Władysław III Spindleshanks and advocated to Pope Innocent III to reverse the excommunication of High Duke Leszek I the White. He emerged as an advocate of the younger dukes in the divided kingdom period. His activism, however, did produce enemies and he had to spend some time in exile with Henry the Bearded of Silesia.

Despite his success, however, the death of Innocent III in 1216 and the succession of Honorius III saw Henryk lose Papal support. Resentment among Polish nobles and clergy resulted in Gedko Powało Bishop of Płock complaining to the new pope that Henryk was guilty of apparent excess and pride. Henryk Kietlicz was instructed and from that time did not participate in political life.

Henryk Kietlicz died on 22 March 1219.

Religious titles
Preceded by Piotr Łabędź	Archbishop of Gniezno; 1199 - 1219	Succeeded by Wincenty Niałek
