= Caritas Poland =

Catholic charity organization

- Caritas Polska
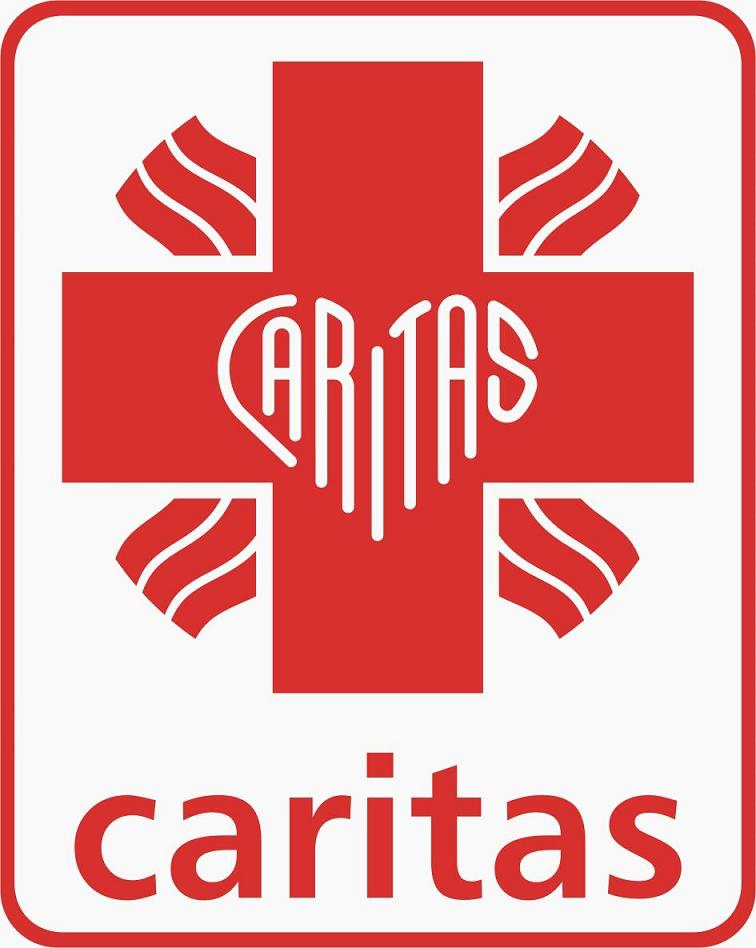
- Established: 1990
- Type: Nonprofit
- Legal status: national charitable foundation
- Location: Warsaw, Poland
- Coordinates: 52.24776°N 20.97795°E
- Origins: Catholic Social Teaching
- Region served: Poland and worldwide
- Fields: social work, humanitarian aid
- Director: Fr. Marcin Iżycki
- Affiliations: Caritas Europa, Caritas Internationalis
- Staff: 9,762 (diocesan level); 9,029 (parish level) (2022)
- Volunteers: 61,138 (2022)
- Website: www.caritas.pl

Caritas Poland (Polish: Caritas Polska) is a Polish Catholic not-for-profit social welfare and humanitarian relief organisation. It is a service of the Polish Bishops' Conference and the largest social welfare and charitable organisation in the country.

Caritas Poland is a member of both Caritas Europa and Caritas Internationalis.

== History ==
"Perła Przemyśla", a Caritas-run restaurant in Przemyśl.

By the end of the 19th century and the beginning of the 20th century, there were different attempts to centralise and coordinate the Catholic Church's charitable activities in Poland. After the Second Polish Republic was established in 1918, this process accelerated. In 1922, an association of Polish Catholic charitable societies was created in Poznań and adopted the name Caritas. It was modelled after the German Caritas, which had been founded 25 years prior. Soon, Caritas associations were established in almost all dioceses. Work included care for children and young people, including through the founding of orphanages and other institutions.

However, the further development of Caritas structures was interrupted by the outbreak of World War II. Immediately after liberation in 1945, Archbishop Sapieha established a national Caritas headquarters, in accordance with the resolution of the Polish Episcopal Conference. In the context of large-scale destruction and huge shortages and needs, the Catholic Church joined in providing all kinds of help to the population. Branches of the renewed Caritas were established in parishes.

The communist authorities and the increased sovietization of the country stood in the way of the dynamically developing union. They saw the philanthropic activity of the Church as actions undermining their authority. The first restrictions on church organisations also appeared to reduce their influence on young people. On 12 January 1950, at a meeting of the Secretariat of the Central Committee of the Polish United Workers' Party, a plan was adopted to completely liquidate the Caritas organisation in Poland, under the pretext of embezzlement of funds. The liquidation took place on 23 January 1950 and the state took over its subordinate institutions.

However, the end of the church structures as Caritas did not mean the cessation of the church's charitable activities, which continued at a lower scale. This activity was coordinated by the Polish Episcopal Commission for the Pastoral Care of Mercy, which was renamed the Polish Episcopal Charitable Commission in 1981. Departments of charitable pastoral care were established in individual dioceses, and charity teams were established in parishes.

In 1989, the state and the church signed an agreement which made it possible to reactivate Caritas Poland and the diocesan Caritas. Caritas Poland was reactivated per a decree of the Polish Episcopal Conference of 10 October 1990 as an institution drawing inspiration from the charitable and social activities conducted in Poland before the Communist regime.

After the fall of communism in Poland, Caritas Poland grew massively. In the 21st century, Caritas Poland and its diocesan structures operate over 1,000 centres specialised in social assistance and in the field of medical and educational care.

In 2021, the National Bank of Poland issued a special collector's coin in honour of the 30th anniversary of the reactivation of Caritas Poland.

== Structure ==
Donation box for Caritas Kraków in the Church of Saints Apostles Peter and Paul.

Caritas Poland operates through a national office and 44 diocesan and archdiocesan Caritas organisations across the country. The national office serves as the central coordinating body and also takes on formative and informative responsibilities. This includes conducting training courses, symposia, and conducting assessments to identify the extent of poverty in Poland.

In addition to its coordination and educational functions, the national office plays an operational role by leading nationwide fundraising initiatives both domestically and internationally. Caritas Poland organises humanitarian transports and provides emergency and long-term assistance, offering material, psychological, legal, and financial aid to various vulnerable groups such as the unemployed, homeless persons, the sick, the elderly, children from struggling families, immigrants, and refugees.

The diocesan structures of Caritas Poland are:

- Caritas of the Archdiocese of Białystok
- Caritas of the Częstochowa Archdiocese
- Caritas of the Archdiocese of Gdańsk
- Caritas of the Archdiocese of Gniezno
- Caritas of Katowice Archdiocese
- Caritas of the Archdiocese of Cracow
- Caritas of Lublin Archdiocese
- Caritas of the Archdiocese of Łódź
- Caritas of the Archdiocese of Poznań
- Caritas of the Archdiocese of Przemyśl
- Caritas of the Archdiocese of Przemyśl-Warsaw Archdiocese of the Greek Catholic Church
- Caritas of the Archdiocese of Szczecin-Kamieńska
- Caritas of the Archdiocese of Warmia
- Caritas of the Archdiocese of Warsaw
- Caritas of the Archdiocese of Wrocław
- Caritas of Bielsko-Żywiec Diocese
- Caritas of Bydgoszcz Diocese
- Caritas of the Diocese of Drohiczyn
- Caritas of Elblag Diocese
- Caritas of Ełk Diocese
- Caritas of Gliwice Diocese
- Caritas of Kalisz diocese
- Caritas of Kielce Diocese
- Caritas of Koszalin-Kołobrzeg Diocese
- Caritas of Legnica Diocese
- Caritas of Łomża Diocese
- Caritas of Łowicz Diocese
- Caritas of Opole Diocese
- Caritas of Pelplin Diocese
- Caritas of Płock Diocese
- Caritas of Radom Diocese
- Caritas of Rzeszów diocese
- Caritas of Sandomierz diocese
- Caritas of Siedlce diocese
- Caritas of Sosnowiec diocese
- Caritas of Świdnica diocese
- Caritas of Tarnów Diocese
- Caritas of Torun Diocese
- Caritas of Warsaw-Praga Diocese
- Caritas of Włoclawek Diocese
- Caritas of the Diocese of Wrocław-Koszalin of the Greek Catholic Church
- Caritas of Zamość-Lubaczów Diocese
- Caritas of Zielona Góra-Gorzów Diocese
- Caritas of the Eparchy of Olsztyn-Gdansk of the Greek Catholic Church
- Caritas of the Field Ordinariate of the Polish Army

== Work ==
In 2022, Caritas Poland supported around 412,000 people with food aid, including 340,000 who received regular assistance. The organisation distributed more than 14,000 tons of food for a value of around 131.5 million złoty. In addition, around 47,500 children received material, educational or psychological. Caritas Lublin has worked with Ukrainian refugees since 2022, as Lublin is only 100 kilometres (62 mi) from Poland's border with Ukraine. One form of assistance provided by Caritas Lublin is the supply of prepaid cards enabling refugees to access funds to meet family needs.

In addition, Caritas Poland provided support abroad in 33 countries on four continents at a level of more than 63 million złoty.
