= Toruń Cathedral =

- Cathedral Basilica of St. John the Baptist and St. John the Evangelist
- Bazylika katedralna św. Jana Chrzciciela i św. Jana Ewangelisty
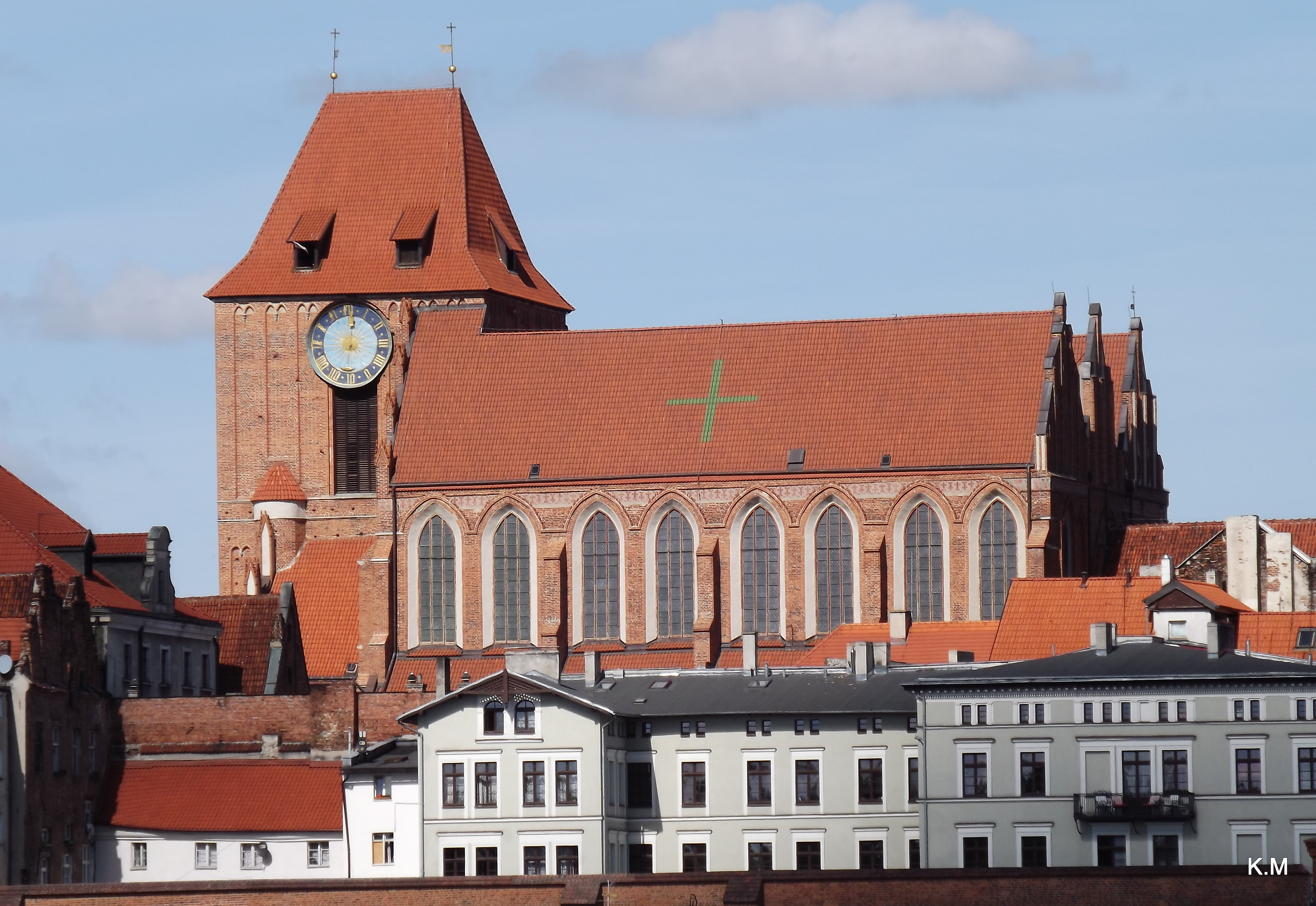
- View from the left bank of Vistula

- 53.009264°N 18.60613°E
- Location: Toruń
- Country: Poland
- Language: Polish
- Denomination: Catholic

History
- Status: Cathedral
- Founded: 13th century
- Dedication: John the Baptist and John the Evangelist

Architecture
- Functional status: Active
- Style: Gothic
- Completed: 15th century

Administration
- Diocese: Toruń

Clergy
- Bishop: Wiesław Śmigiel

UNESCO World Heritage Site
- Type: Cultural
- Criteria: ii, iv
- Designated: 1997
- Part of: Medieval Town of Toruń
- Reference no.: 835
- UNESCO region: Europe

Historic Monument of Poland
- Designated: 8 September 1994
- Part of: Toruń – Old and New Town
- Reference no.: M.P. z 1994 r. Nr 50, poz. 422

The Cathedral Basilica of St. John the Baptist and St. John the Evangelist (Polish: Bazylika katedralna św. Jana Chrzciciela i św. Jana Ewangelisty), also called Toruń Cathedral, is a Gothic cathedral and minor basilica located in the Old Town of Toruń, Poland, seat of the Roman Catholic Diocese of Toruń.

As part of the Medieval Town of Toruń it is listed as a UNESCO World Heritage Site and a Historic Monument of Poland.

One of three Gothic churches of the town, it is built from brick, an aisled hall with a monumental west tower. The first church from the 13th century was a small hall without aisles and with polygonal presbytery. This was replaced by aisled hall church in the first half of the 14th century, which has been rebuilt many times and extended until it reached its present form at the end of the 15th century. The interior is richly decorated and furnished. The earliest painted decorations in the presbytery date back to the 14th century and depict the Crucifixion and the Last Judgement. One of the side chapels is connected with Nicolaus Copernicus. There is a 13th-century baptismal font, supposedly used for baptizing the astronomer, 16th-century epitaph to him, and 18th-century monument. At the tower hangs Tuba Dei, the third-largest bell in Poland, cast in 1500. The heart of Polish King John I Albert was buried in the cathedral after his death in Toruń in 1501. Formerly the main parish church of the Old Town of Toruń, since 1935, it is a Minor Basilica, and since 1992 the Cathedral of the Roman Catholic Diocese of Toruń.

== Gallery ==
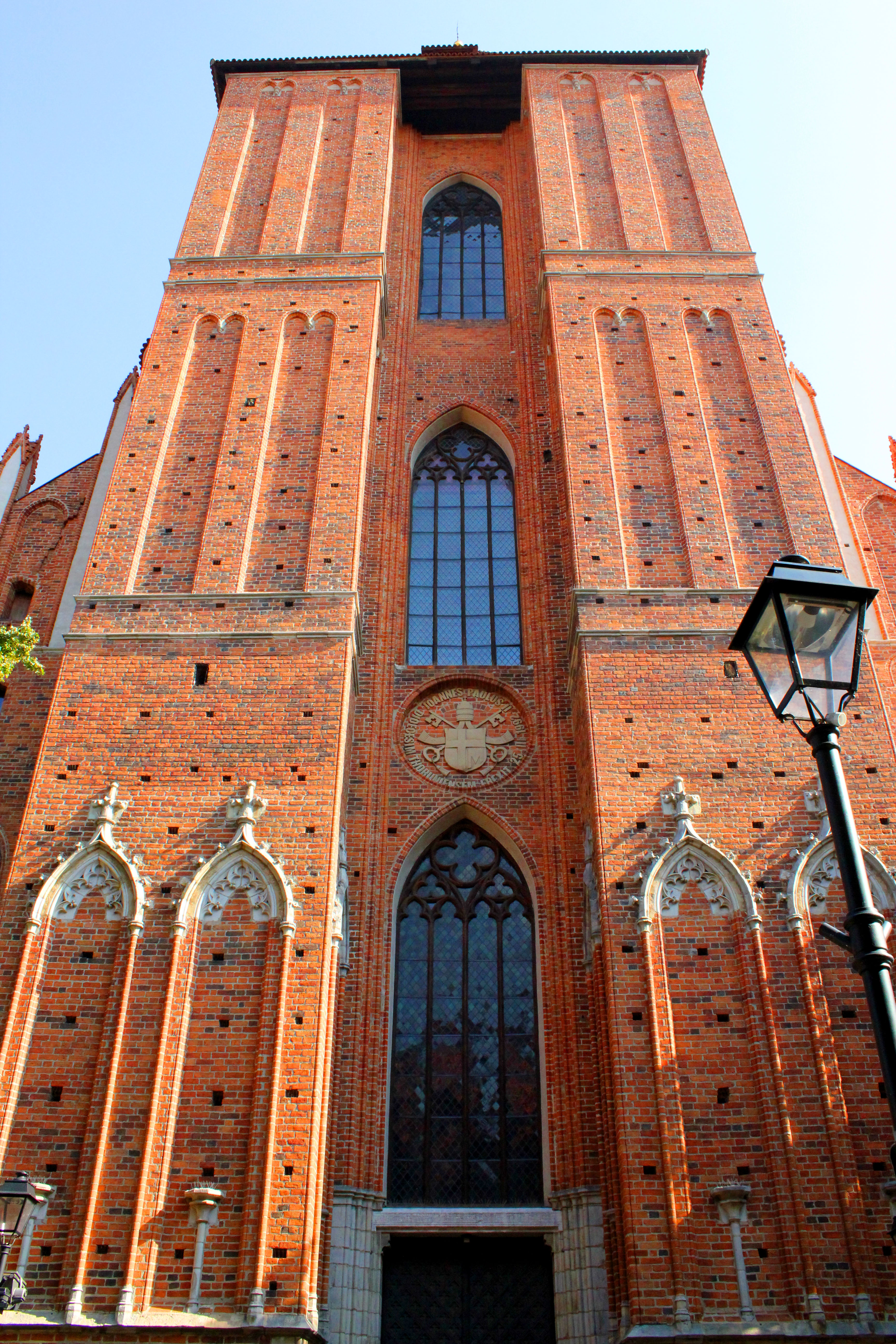
Façade and tower (view from the west)

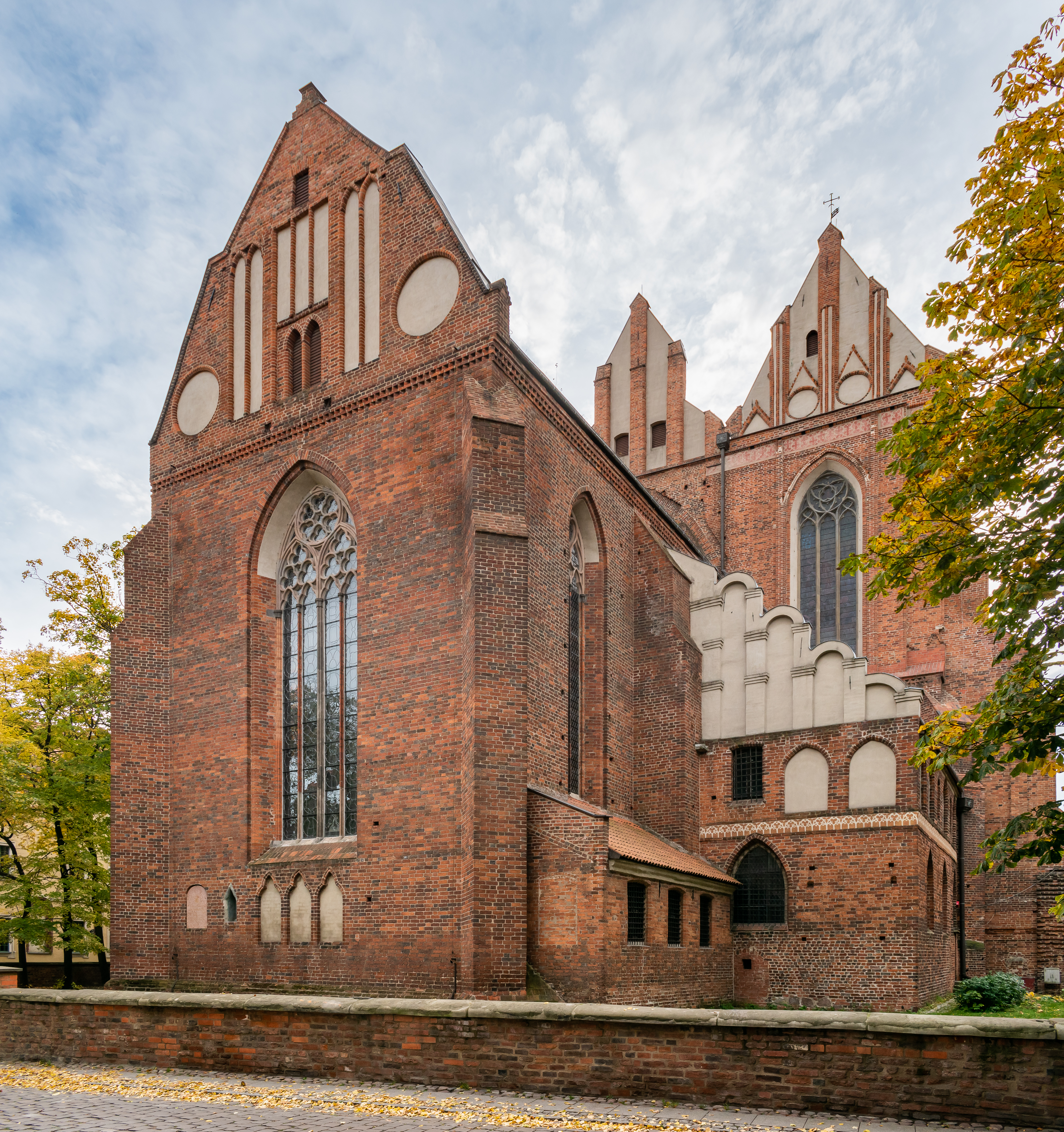
View from the east

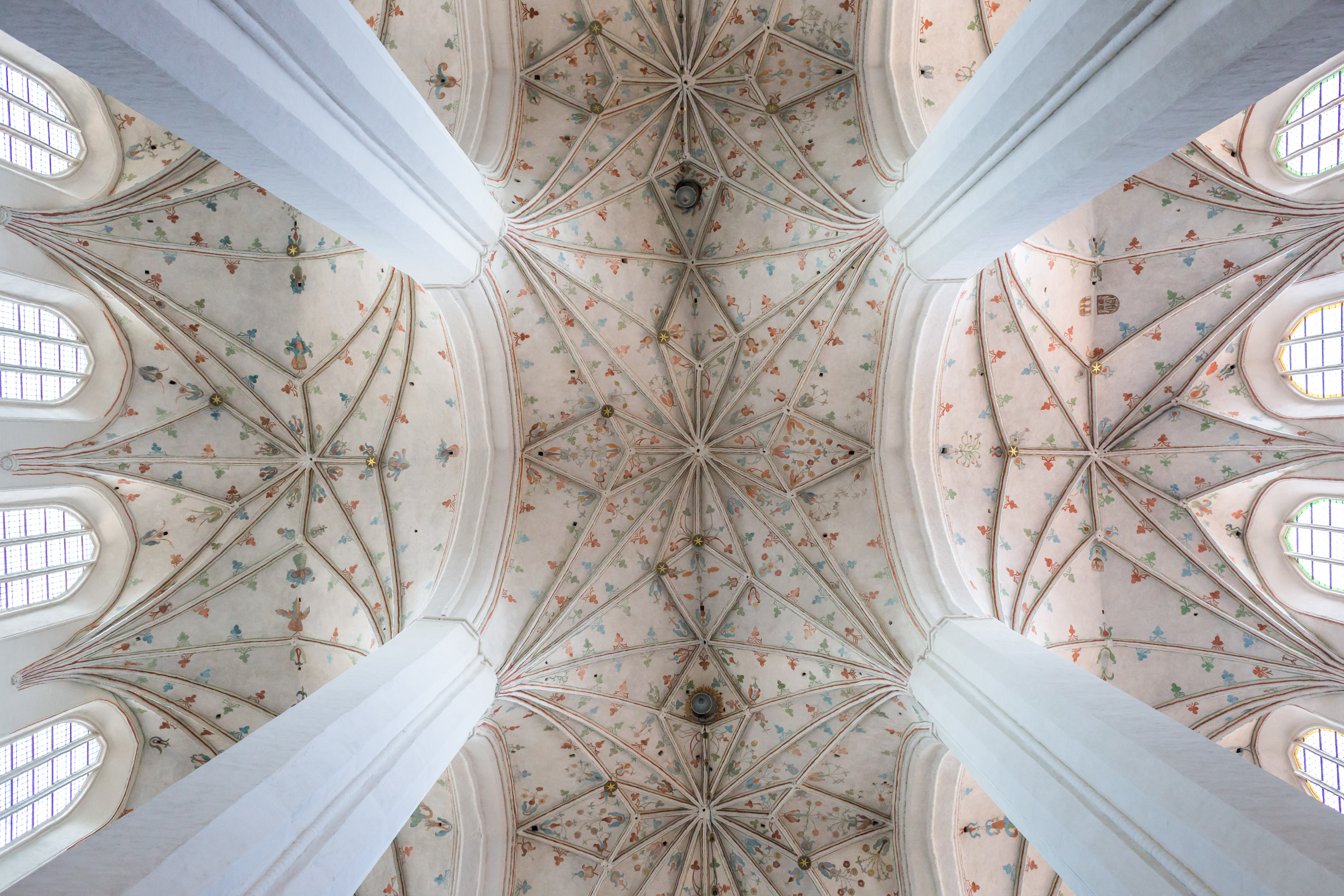
Vault

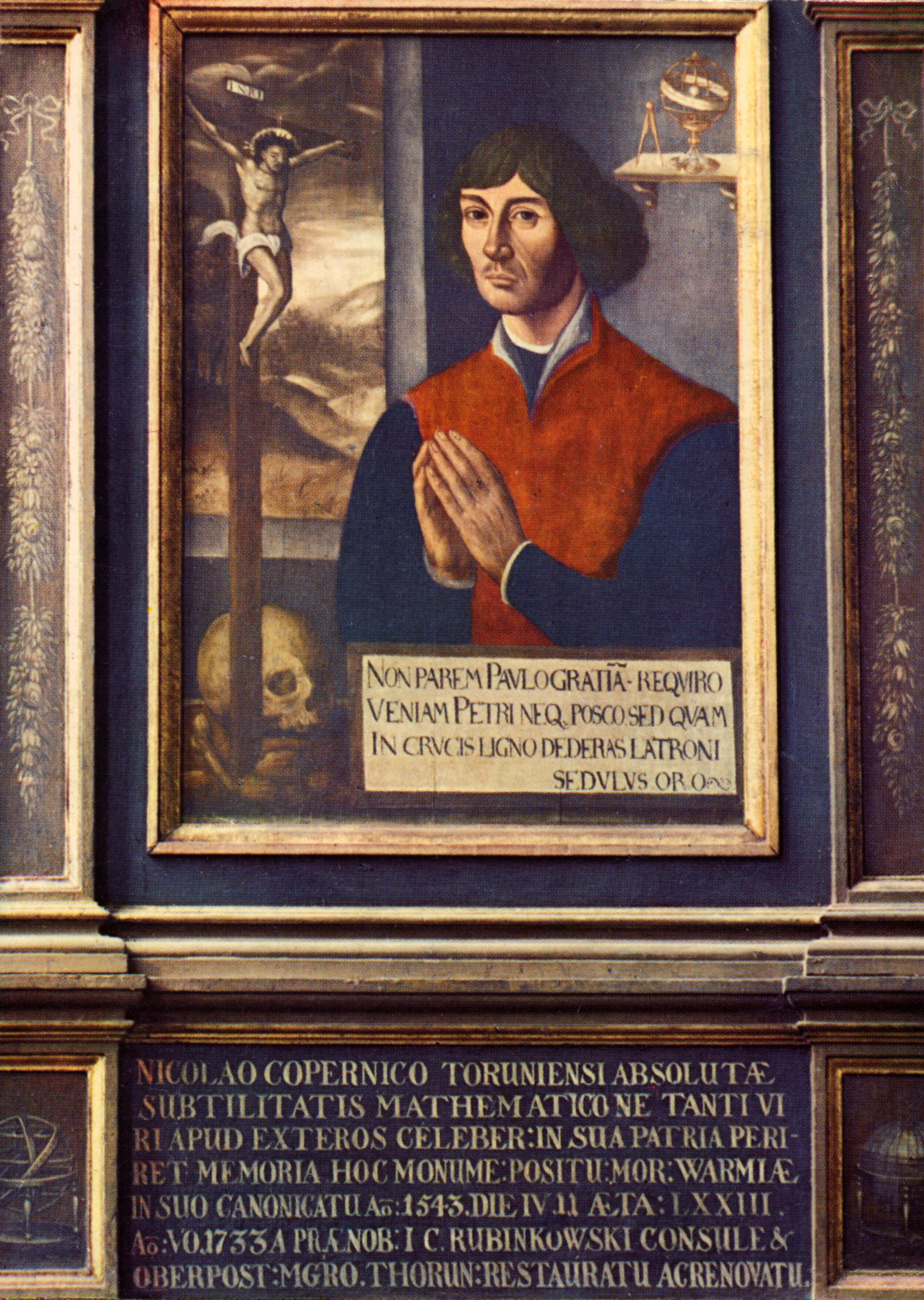
Nicolaus Copernicus epitaph
