= Suski (surname) =

Suski is a surname. Notable people with the surname include:

- Andrzej Suski (born 1941), Polish Roman Catholic prelate
- Augustyn Suski (1907–1942), Polish poet
- Leszek Suski (1930–2007), Polish fencer
- Marek Suski (born 1958), Polish politician
- Marian Suski (1905–1993), Polish fencer and engineer
