= Diocese of Koszalin–Kołobrzeg =

Latin Catholic diocese in Poland

Coordinates: 54.1895°N 16.1804°E

Diocese of Koszalin-Kołobrzeg Dioecesis Coslinensis-Colubregana Diecezja Koszalińsko-Kołobrzeska

Catholic
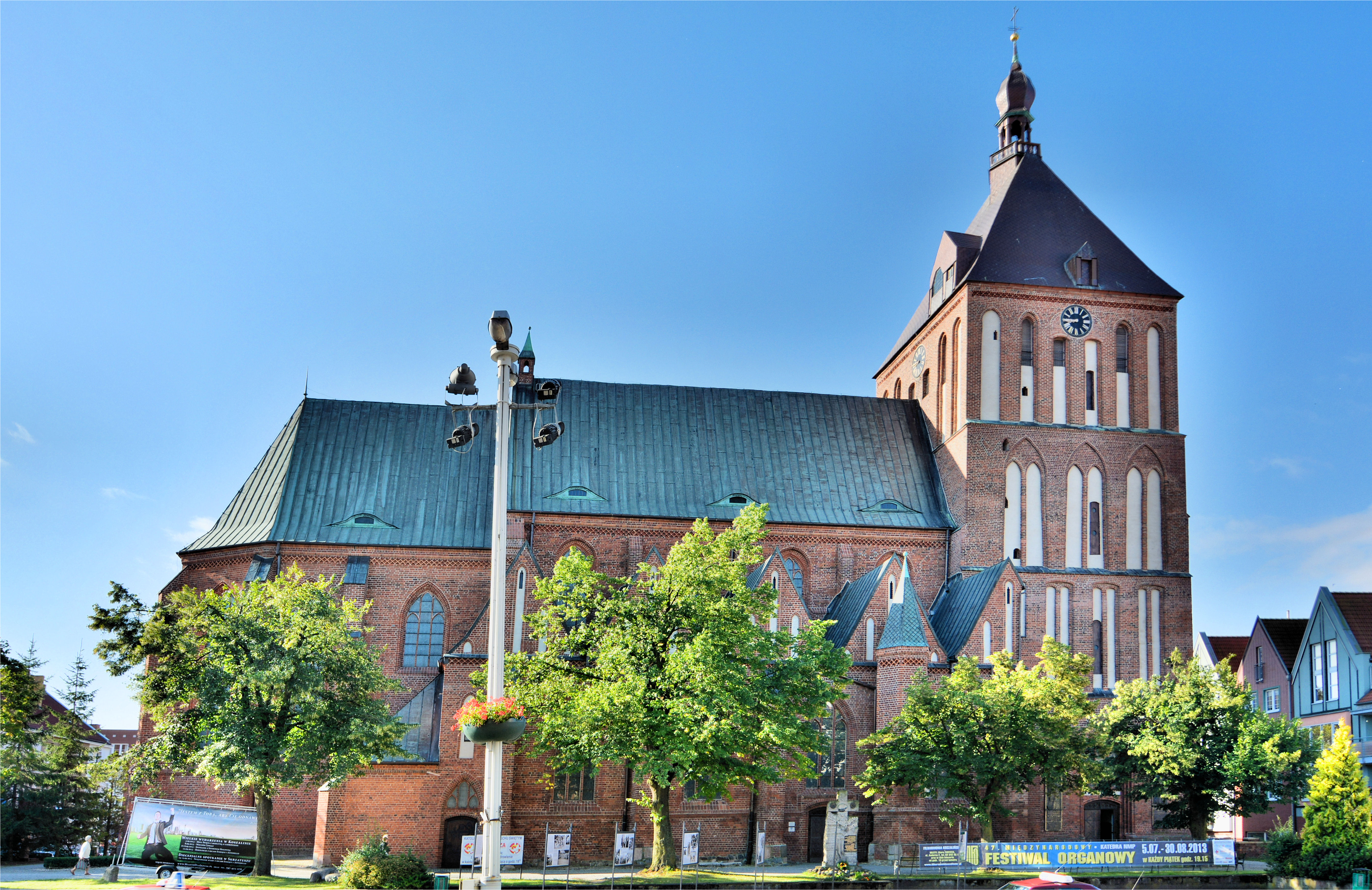
- Cathedral of the Immaculate Conception in Koszalin

Location
- Country: Poland
- Ecclesiastical province: Szczecin-Kamień

Statistics
- Area: 14,640 km^{2} (5,650 sq mi)
- Population: Total; Catholics: (as of 2019); 901,120; 811,430 (90%)

Information
- Denomination: Catholic Church
- Sui iuris church: Latin Church
- Rite: Roman Rite
- Established: 28 June 1972
- Cathedral: Katedra pw. Niepokalanego Poczęcia; Najświętszej Maryi Panny in Koszalin
- Co-cathedral: Bazylika Konkatedralna Wniebowzięcia; Najświętszej Maryi Panny in Kołobrzegu

Current leadership
- Pope: Leo XIV
- Bishop: Krzysztof Zadarko
- Metropolitan Archbishop: Wiesław Śmigiel
- Bishops emeritus: Paweł Cieślik (Auxiliary); Edward Dajczak

Website
- diecezjakoszalin.pl

Map of Roman Catholic Diocese of Koszalin-Kołobrzeg

The Diocese of Koszalin-Kołobrzeg (Latin: Dioecesis Coslinensis-Colubregana) is a Latin Church ecclesiastical jurisdiction of diocese of the Catholic Church in northwestern Poland. The diocese is a suffragan in the ecclesiastical province of the metropolitan Archdiocese of Szczecin-Kamień. The Diocese of Koszalin-Kołobrzeg's cathedral is the Katedra Niepokalanego Poczęcia NMP, in Koszalin. There is also a co-cathedral, the minor basilica Bazylika Konkatedralna Wniebowzięcia NMP, in Kołobrzeg, both in Zachodniopomorskie.

== Statistics ==
As of 2014, it pastorally served 822,058 Catholics (90.0% of 912,929 total) on 14,640 km² in 220 parishes with 574 priests (439 diocesan, 135 religious), 367 lay religious (142 brothers, 225 sisters) and 53 seminarians. According to the Polish Institute of the Catholic Church Statistics, weekly mass attendance was 25% in 2013 making the diocese the second least devoutly religious one in Poland after the Archdiocese of Szczecin-Kamień.

== Precursor bishopric of Kołobrzeg ==
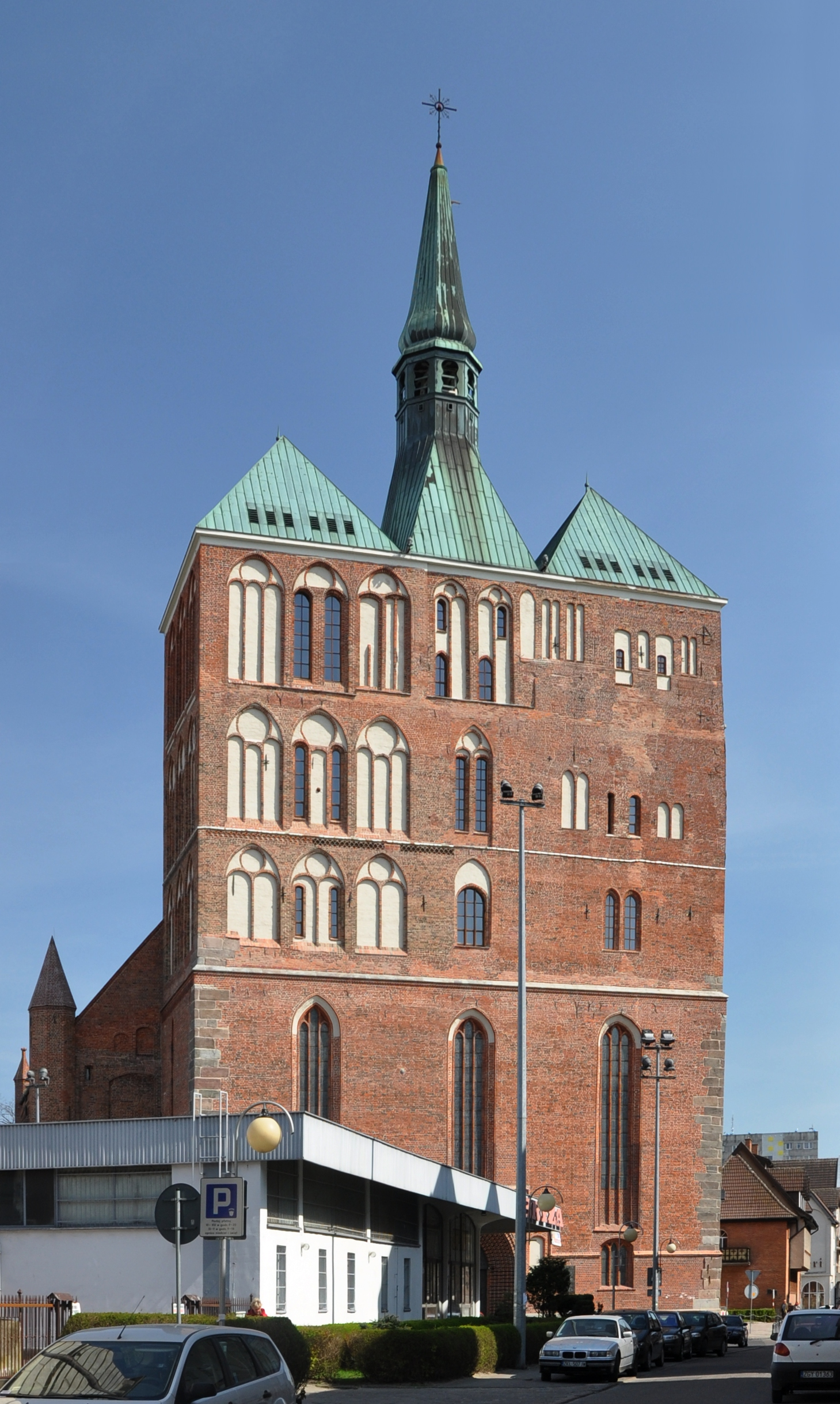
Co-Cathedral Basilica of the Assumption in Kołobrzeg

In 1000 the Diocese of Kołobrzeg was established in Kołobrzeg by Polish ruler Bolesław I the Brave, along with the dioceses of Wrocław and Kraków and the Archdiocese of Gniezno, as one of the oldest Polish dioceses (the only older diocese being the diocese of Poznań, established in 968).

In 1015 it was however suppressed, its territory being reassigned partly to the Metropolitan Archdiocese of Gniezno (from 1145 however signed over to the exempt Diocese of Kammin), and partly to establish the Diocese of Kujawy–Pomorze (which would merge into aforementioned Gniezno). Only one residential bishop of Kołobrzeg is recorded: Reinbern (1000 – 1007), died 1013.

== History ==
- 1945 - part of Apostolic Administration of Kamień, Lubusz and the Prelature of Piła
- Established on June 28, 1972 as Diocese of Koszalin – Kołobrzeg, part of the ecclesiastical province of Gniezno, on territories split off from the Diocese of Berlin and from parts of the suppressed Territorial Prelature of Piła, but formally restoring the Kołobrzeg diocese.
- Enjoyed a Papal visit from the Polish Pope John Paul II in June 1991.
- Gained territory on 1992.03.25 from the Roman Catholic Diocese of Zielona Góra-Gorzów, retroceedimg at the same time eastern deaneries to the Diocese of Chełmno, and made part of the ecclesiastical province of Szczecin-Kamień
- Lost territory on 2004.02.24 to establish the Diocese of Bydgoszcz

== Episcopal ordinaries ==
- Ignacy Ludwik Jeż (1972.06.28 – 1992.02.01, Retired)
- Czesław Domin (1992.02.01 – 1996.03.15)
- Marian Gołębiewski (1996.07.20 – 2004.04.03, Appointed, Archbishop of Wrocław)
- Kazimierz Nycz (2004.06.09 – 2007.03.03, Appointed, Archbishop of Warsaw)
- Edward Dajczak (2007.06.23 – 2023.02.02, Resigned)
- Zbigniew Zieliński (2023.02.02 – 2025.03.19, Appointed, Archbishop of Poznań)
- Krzysztof Zadarko (2026.02.02 – Present)

== See also ==
- List of Catholic dioceses in Poland
- Roman Catholicism in Poland

== Sources and external links ==
- GCatholic.org, with Google map and satellite photo - data for all sections
- Catholic Hierarchy
- Diocesan website
