= Andrzej Dzięga =

Roman Catholic archbishop and professor

- Metropolitan Archbishop emeritus of Szczecin-Kamień
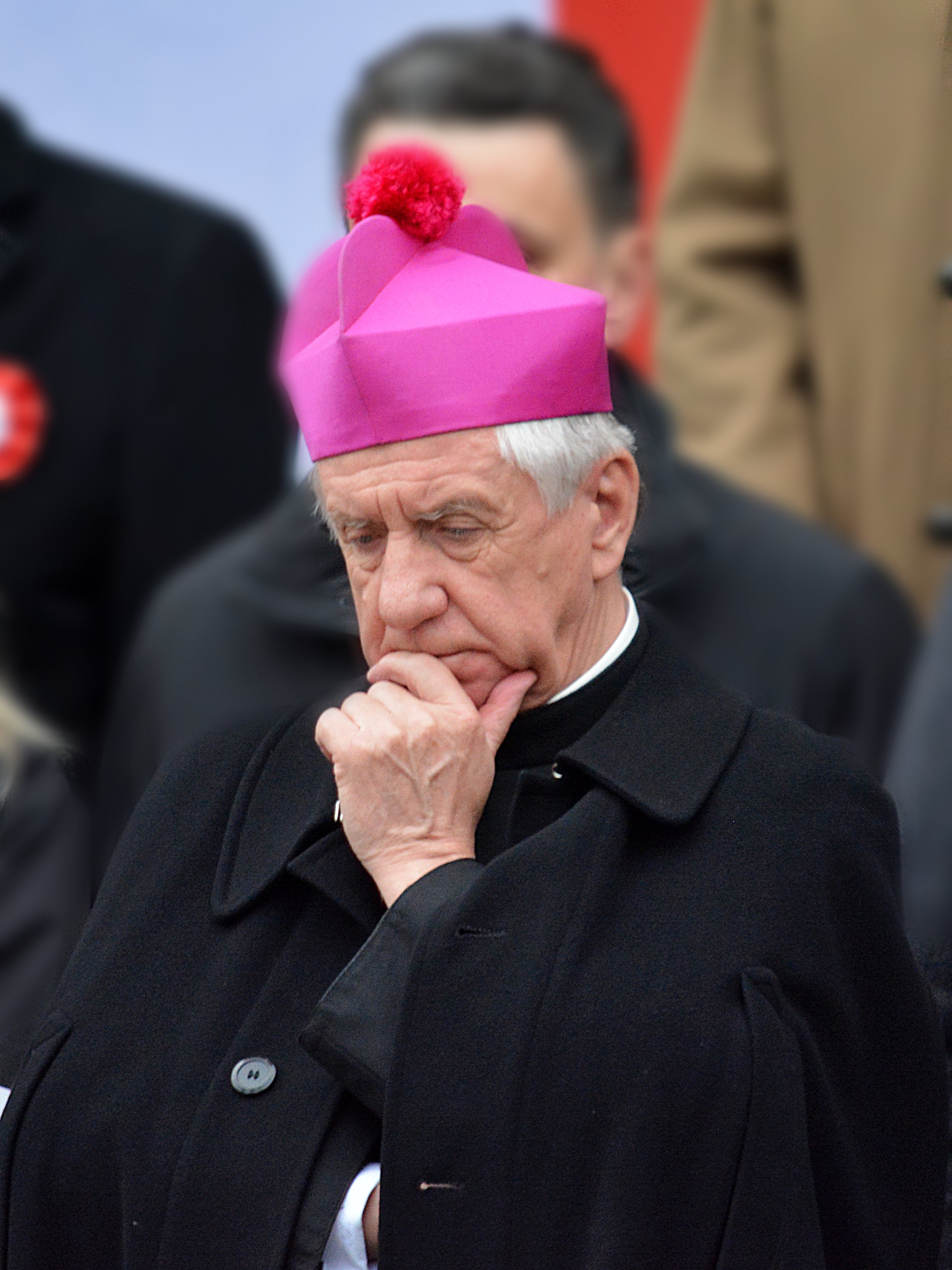
- Dzięga in 2021
- Installed: 4 April 2009
- Term ended: 24 February 2024
- Predecessor: Zygmunt Kamiński
- Successor: Wiesław Śmigiel
- Other post: Bishop of Sandomierz (2002 –2009)

Orders
- Ordination: 11 June 1997 by Jan Mazur
- Consecration: 24 November 2002 by Józef Kowalczyk

Personal details
- Born: 14 December 1952 (age 73) Radzyń Podlaski
- Motto: Dominus Jesus

Academic background
- Education: John Paul II Catholic University of Lublin (JCL, PhD, dr hab.)
- Thesis: Recepcja myśli Giuseppe Chiovendy w kościelnym procesie ustnym (1988)

Mons. Dr. Andrzej Dzięga (born 14 December 1952) is a Polish prelate of the Catholic Church who was an metropolitan archbishop of the Metropolitan Archdiocese of Szczecin-Kamień from 2009 to 2024. He was bishop of the Diocese of Sandomierz from 2002 to 2009.

== Biography ==
Dzięga was born in 1952 in Radzyń Podlaski. He completed his general education in 1971 and he attended the seminary in Siedlce, where he was ordained a priest in 1977 by Jan Mazur. He attended the John Paul II Catholic University of Lublin, earning a licentiate in canon law in 1985 and a doctorate in canon law in 1988. He attained habilitation in 1995 and was made a professor of the university in 1998.

Between 1986 and 1989, Dzięga served as notary of the ecclesiastical court of the Diocese of Siedlce; he also served as vice-postulator for the Pratulin Martyrs. From 1993 and 2002, he was judicial vicar for the Diocese of Drohiczyn. He was appointed dean of the Faculty of Law at the Catholic University of Lublin in 1996.

Pope John Paul II appointed Dzięga Bishop of Sandomierz on 7 October 2002. He received his episcopal consecration on 24 November from Archbishop Józef Kowalczyk, Apostolic Nuncio to Poland. He was appointed Archbishop of Szczecin-Kamień by Pope Benedict XVI on 21 February 2009 and installed there on 4 April.

In 2014, Dzięga received an honorary doctorate from the Pázmány Péter Catholic University. He was also granted honorary citizenship in Radzyń Podlaski in 2016. In 2017, he was awarded the Commander's Cross of the Hungarian Order of Merit for improving Polish-Hungarian relations.

Pope Francis accepted his resignation on 24 February 2024, almost four years before Dzięga was required to submit his resignation at age 75. Dzięga wrote in a letter to the priests of the Archdiocese that his health was the reason, specifically "radical weakening of my condition". A later announcement by the Apostolic Nunciature to Poland said that his retirement resulted from "an investigation by the Holy See into the management of the diocese, and in particular the negligence referred to in the papal document Vos estis lux mundi", which established procedures holding bishops accountable for handling cases of sexual abuse.
