= Wiesław Śmigiel =

Polish Roman Catholic archbishop (born 1969)

- Metropolitan archbishop of Szczecin-Kamień
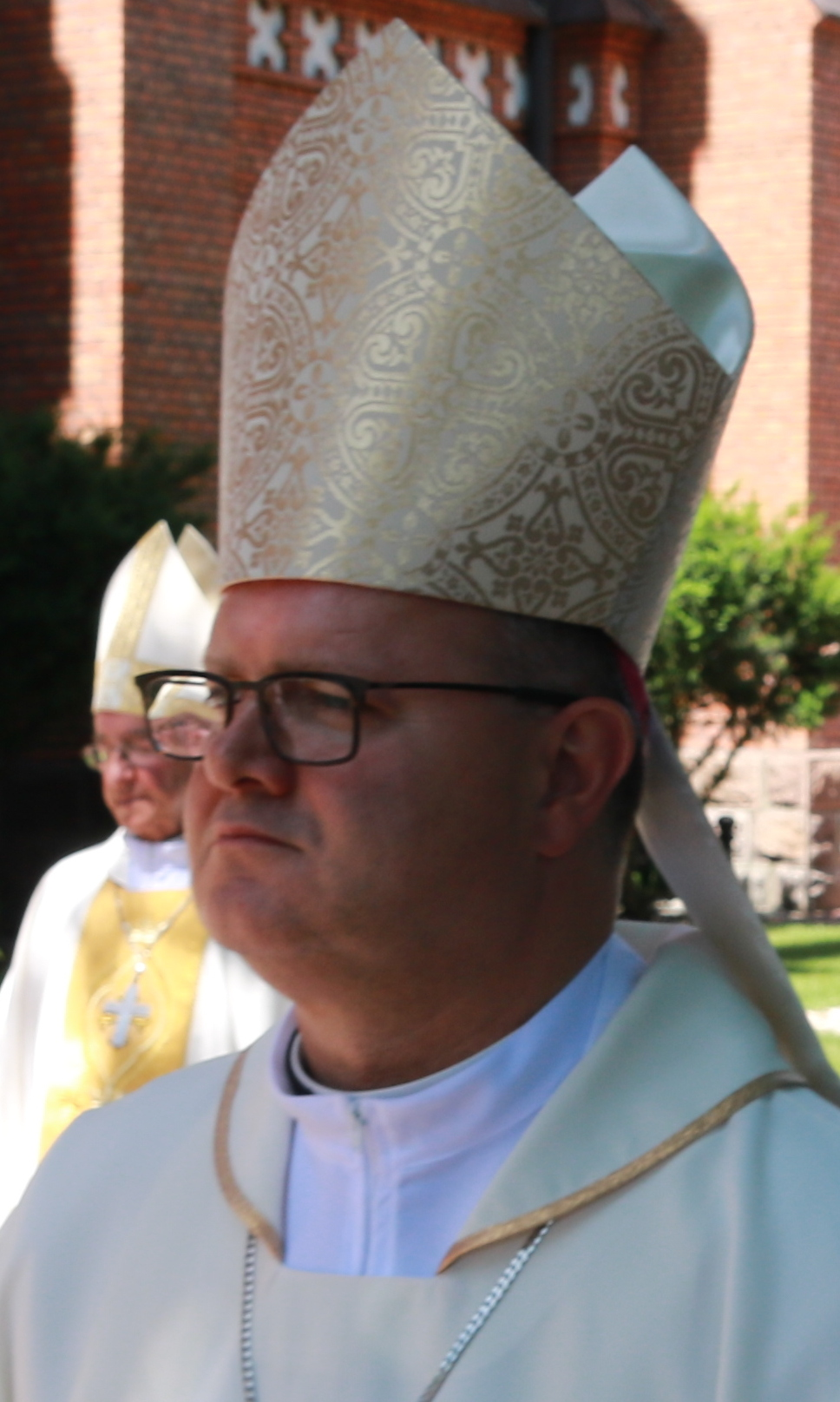
- Śmigiel in 2018
- Installed: 26 October 2024
- Predecessor: Andrzej Dzięga
- Previous posts: Bishop of Toruń (2017 – 2024); Auxiliary bishop of Pelplin (2012–2017); Titular bishop of Beatia (2012–2017)

Orders
- Ordination: 29 May 1994
- Consecration: 21 April 2012 by Sławoj Leszek Głódź

Personal details
- Born: 3 January 1969 (age 56) Świecie, Poland
- Coat of arms

Wiesław Śmigiel (born 3 January 1969) is the incumbent Roman Catholic metropolitan archbishop of the Metropolitan Archdiocese of Szczecin-Kamień. He previously served as the bishop of the Diocese of Toruń from 2017 to 2024 and as auxiliary bishop of the Diocese of Pelplin from 2012 to 2017.

== Biography ==
Śmigiel was born in Świecie and was ordained a priest on 29 May 1994. He received a doctorate from the John Paul II Catholic University of Lublin in 2003 and a habilitation in 2010.

On 24 March 2012, Pope Benedict XVI appointed Śmigiel as auxiliary bishop of Pelplin and titular bishop of Beatia; he was consecrated on 21 April 2012 in the Cathedral Basilica of the Assumption by Sławoj Leszek Głódź, with assistance from Henryk Muszyński and Andrzej Suski. On 11 December 2017, he was appointed Bishop of Toruń. He was appointed apostolic administrator of the Diocese of Bydgoszcz in 2021, and additionally apostolic administrator of the Diocese of Płock in 2022.

On 13 September 2024, Śmigiel was appointed by Pope Francis as metropolitan archbishop of the Metropolitan Archdiocese of Szczecin-Kamień. He was installed as archbishop on 26 October 2024 at Szczecin Cathedral.
