= Tuba Dei =

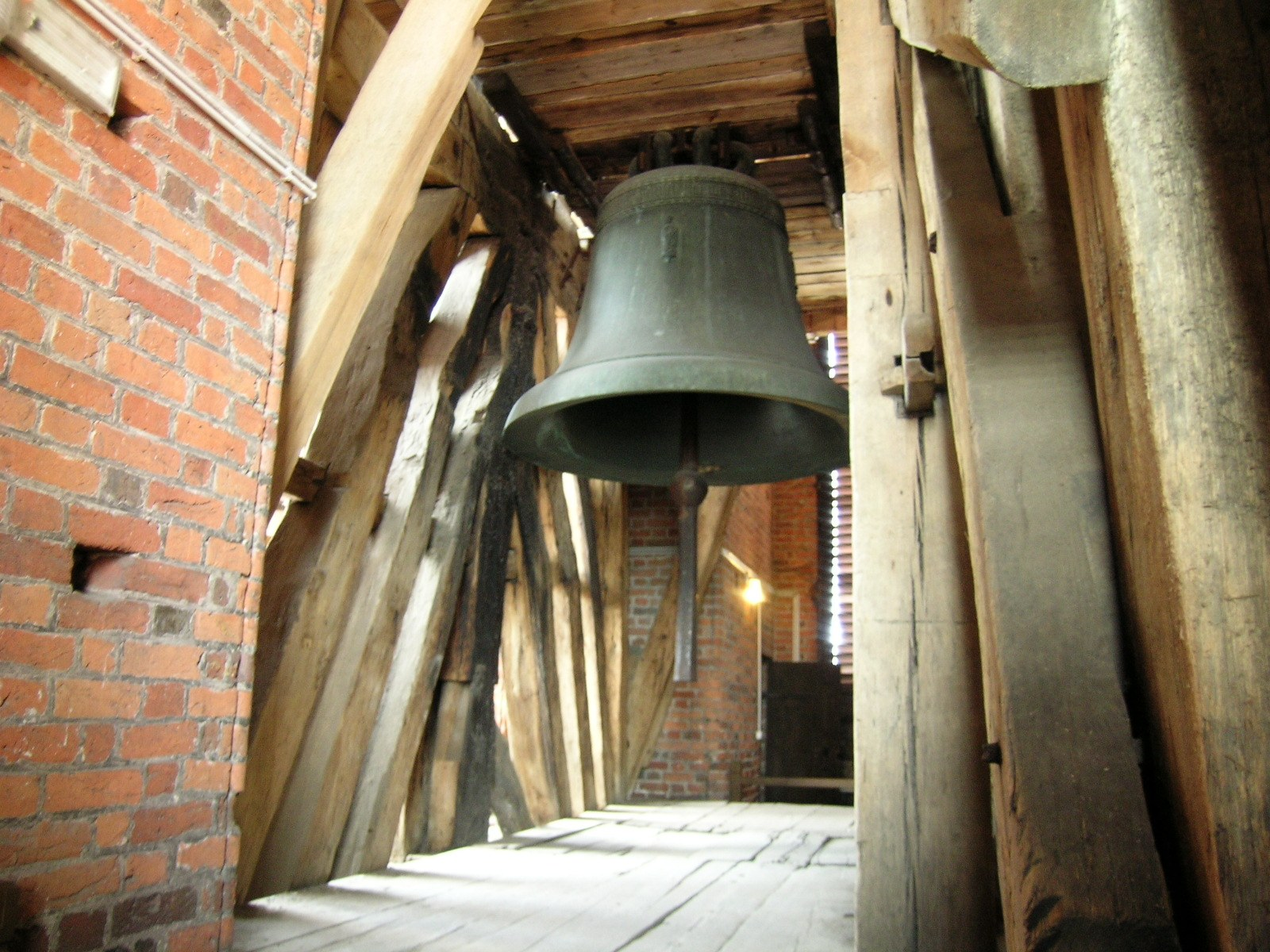
- Tuba Dei bell
- Interactive map of the Tuba Dei area

General information
- Type: Tower bell
- Architectural style: Gothic
- Location: Toruń, Poland
- Coordinates: 53°00′33″N 18°36′22″E
- Opened: 22 September 1500

Technical details
- Material: Bronze

Design and construction
- Architect: Martin Schmidt

Tuba Dei (Latin for "God's Trumpet"), is the largest medieval bell in Poland and one of the largest medieval bells in Europe, hanging in the tower of the Cathedral Basilica of St. John the Baptist and St. John the Evangelist in Toruń. It was cast in Toruń by local founder Martin Schmidt in 1500, and until the casting of the Sigismund Bell (20 years later) it was the largest bell in Poland.

The bell weighs almost 7,500 kg (including a 200-kg clapper), has a diameter of 2.27 m, and is 2 m high.

== Uppsala Cathedral ==
Another bell, now called Thornan, was taken from Toruń as war booty in 1703 by Swedish forces of Carl XII during the Great Northern War. It hangs in the northern tower of Uppsala Cathedral, having replaced bells destroyed in the Uppsala Fire of 1702.
