= Diocese of Toruń =

Roman Catholic diocese in Poland

Coordinates: 53°00′33″N 18°36′22″E

Diocese of Toruń Dioecesis Thoruniensis Diecezja Toruńska

Catholic
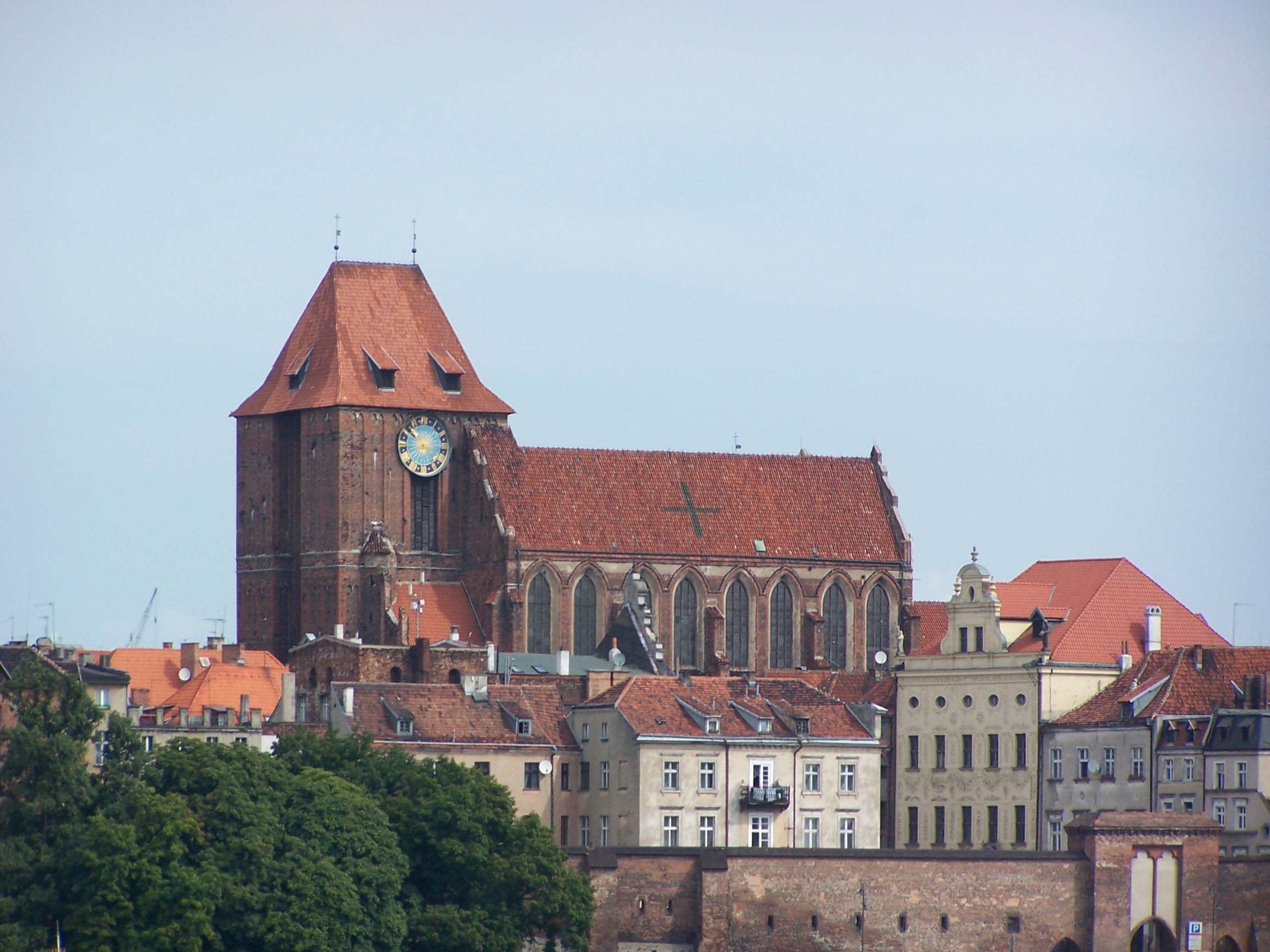
- Cathedral Basilica of St. John the Baptist and St. John the Evangelist, Toruń

Location
- Country: Poland
- Ecclesiastical province: Gdańsk
- Metropolitan: Gdańsk

Statistics
- Area: 5,427 km^{2} (2,095 sq mi)
- Population: Total; Catholics: (as of 2020); 625,190; 581,500 (93%)
- Parishes: 195

Information
- Denomination: Roman Catholic
- Rite: Latin Rite
- Cathedral: Bazylika Katedralna św. Jana Chrzciciela (Cathedral Basilica of St. John the Baptist)
- Co-cathedral: Bazylika Konkatedralna Trójcy Świętej in Chełmża (Co-Cathedral Basilica of the Most Holy Trinity, Chełmża )
- Patron saint: Our Lady of Perpetual Help; Stefan Wincenty Frelichowski; Maria Karłowska; Jutta of Kulmsee
- Secular priests: 483

Current leadership
- Pope: Leo XIV
- Bishop: Arkadiusz Okroj
- Metropolitan Archbishop: Tadeusz Wojda S.A.C.
- Auxiliary Bishops: Józef Szamocki
- Bishops emeritus: Andrzej Wojciech Suski; Wiesław Śmigiel

Map
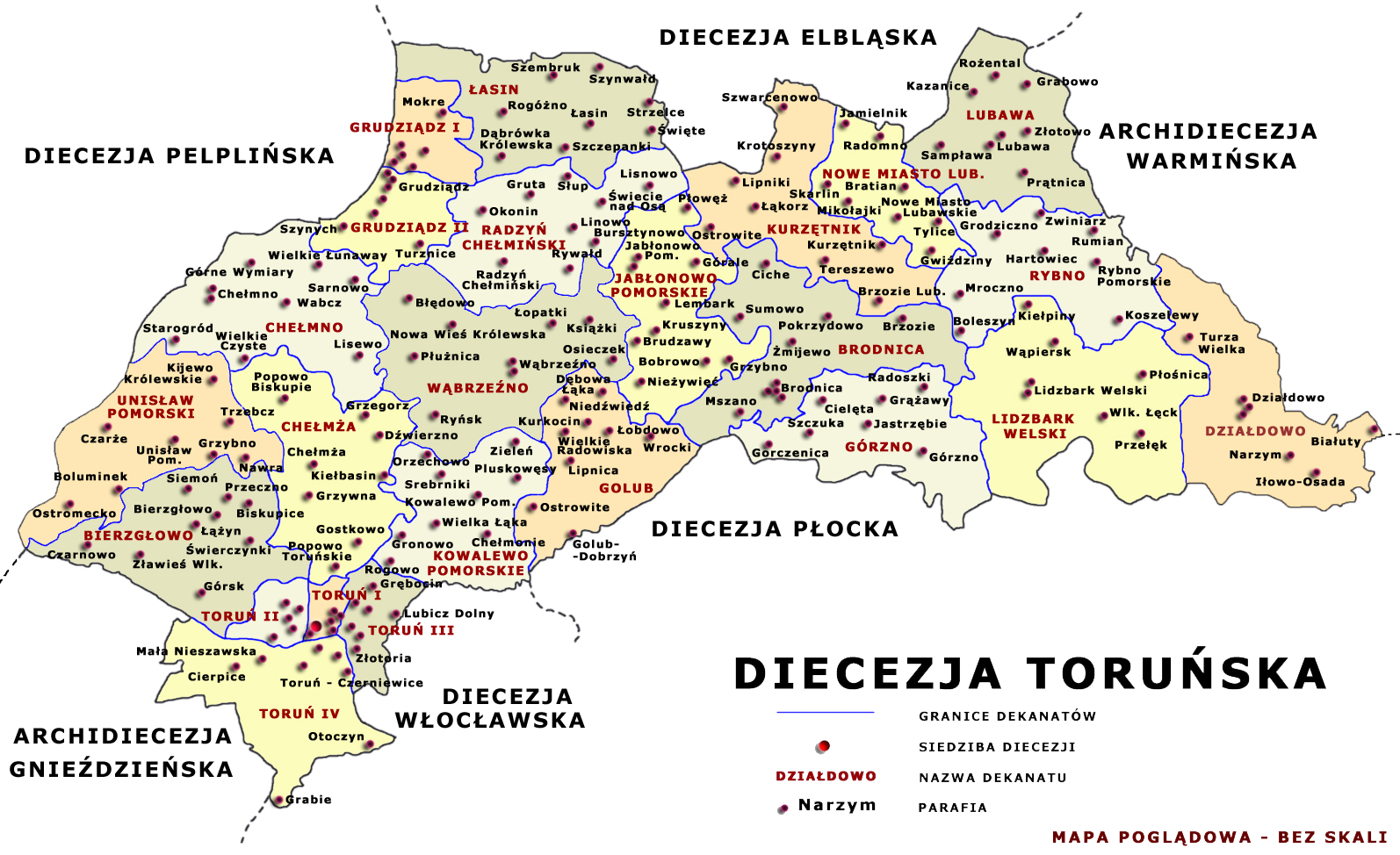
- Map of the Diocese

Website
- www.diecezja.torun.pl

The Diocese of Toruń (Latin: Dioecesis Thoruniensis) is a Latin Church ecclesiastical territory or diocese of the Catholic Church located in the city of Toruń in the ecclesiastical province of Gdańsk in Poland.

== History ==
- March 25, 1992: Established as Diocese of Toruń from the Diocese of Chelmno and Metropolitan Archdiocese of Gniezno

== Special churches ==
- Minor Basilicas:
  - Bazylika pw. św. Tomasza Apostoła, Nowe Miasto Lubawskie
    (Basilica of St. Thomas the Apostle)

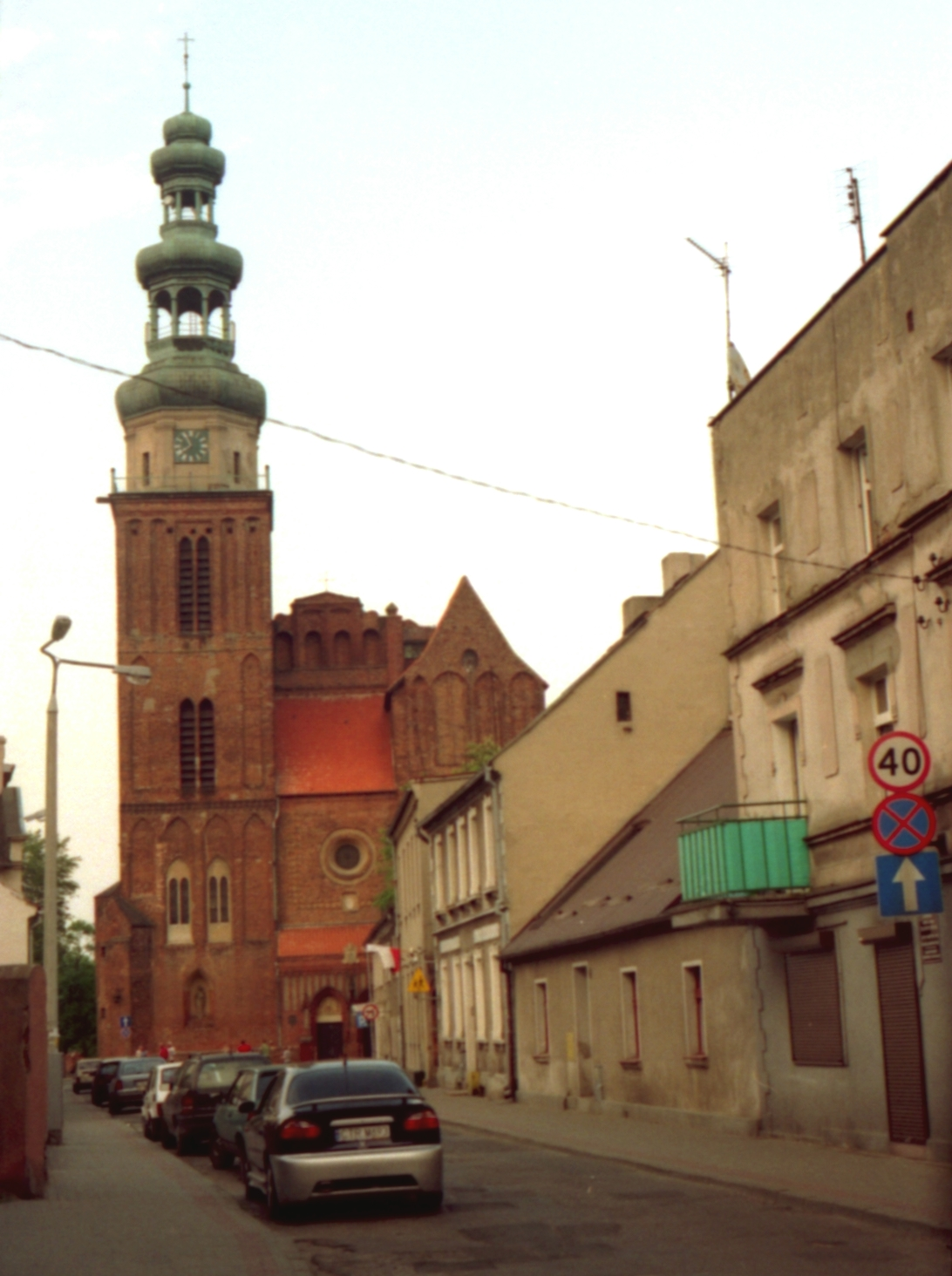
The Co-Cathedral of the Holy Trinity in Chełmża

== Leadership ==
- Bishops of Toruń (Roman rite)
  - Bishop Arkadiusz Okroj (since April 5, 2025)
  - Bishop Andrzej Wojciech Suski (March 25, 1992 – November 11, 2017)
  - Bishop Wiesław Śmigiel (November 11, 2017 – September 13, 2024)

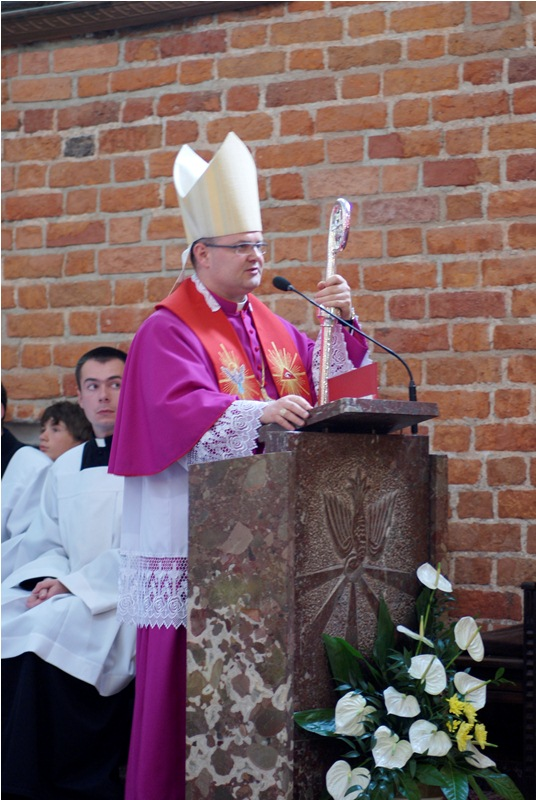
Bishop Wiesław Śmigiel

== See also ==
- Roman Catholicism in Poland

== Sources ==
- GCatholic.org
- Catholic Hierarchy
- Diocese website
