= Archdiocese of Szczecin-Kamień =

Roman Catholic archdiocese in Poland

Coordinates: 53°25′30″N 14°33′18″E

Metropolitan Archdiocese of Szczecin and Kamień Archidioecesis Metropolitae Sedinensis-Caminensis Archidiecezja Metropolita szczecińsko-kamieńska

Catholic
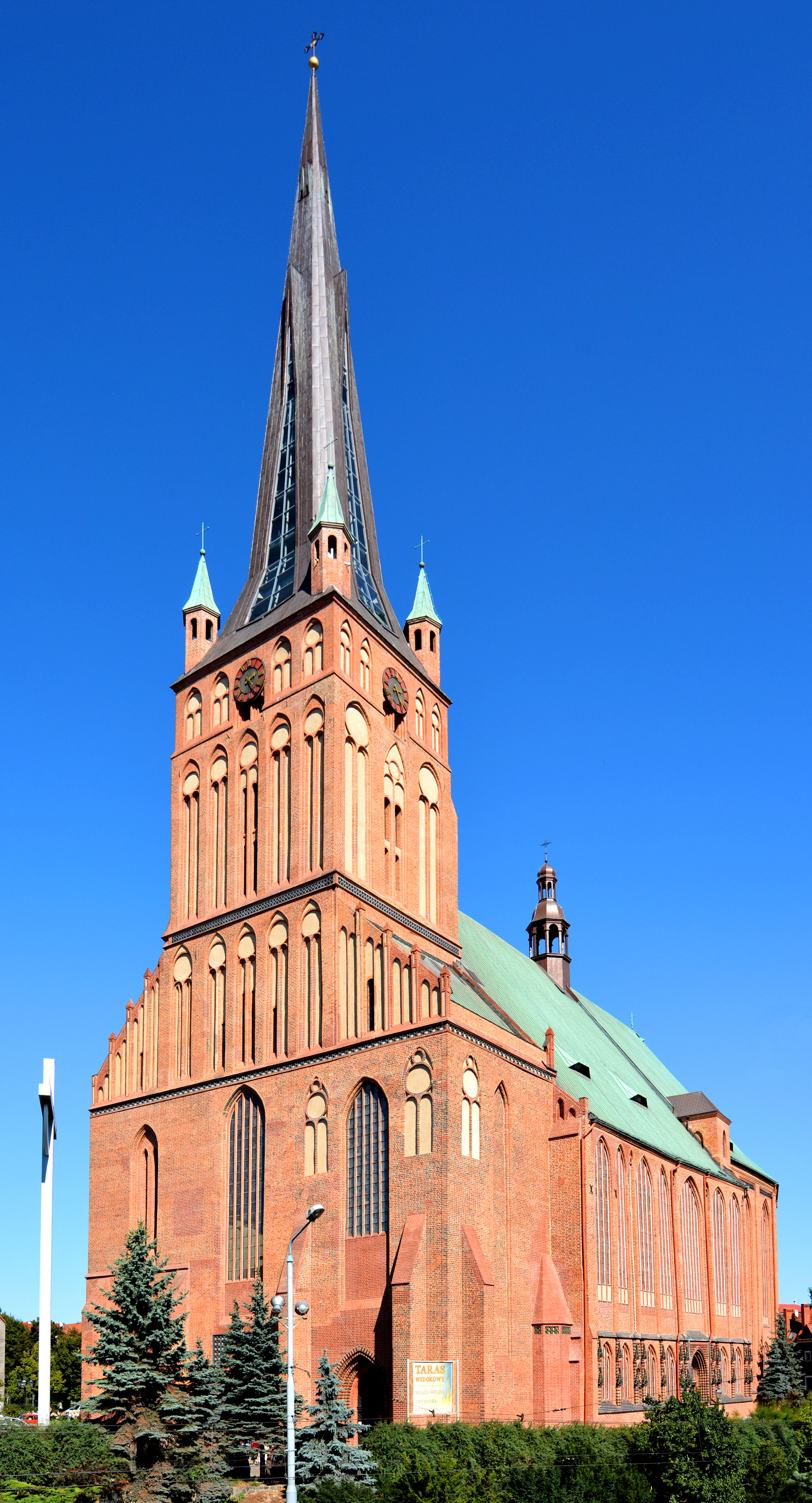
- Cathedral Basilica of St James in Szczecin

Location
- Country: Poland

Statistics
- Area: 12,754 km^{2} (4,924 sq mi)
- Population: Total; Catholics: (as of 2020); 1,014,003; 975,450 (96,2%)

Information
- Denomination: Catholic Church
- Rite: Latin Rite
- Cathedral: Cathedral Basilica of St. James the Apostle, Szczecin
- Co-cathedral: Co-Cathedral of St. John the Baptist in Kamień Pomorski

Current leadership
- Pope: Leo XIV
- Metropolitan Archbishop: Wiesław Śmigiel
- Auxiliary Bishops: Henryk Wejman
- Bishops emeritus: Andrzej Dzięga

Website
- Website of the Archdiocese

Map of Roman Catholic Archdiocese of Szeczecin-Kamien

The Roman Catholic Metropolitan Archdiocese of Szczecin and Kamień (Latin: Archidioecesis Metropolitae Sedinensis-Caminensis) is a Latin Church archdiocese of the Catholic Church whose sees are in the cities of Szczecin and Kamień Pomorski in Poland. With 24,3% of its population attending church services weekly or more in 2013 it is the least devoutly religious diocese in Poland.

== History ==
- 1945: part of the territory of the Apostolic Administration of Kamień, Lubusz and the Prelature of Piła
- June 28, 1972: Created as Diocese of Szczecin – Kamień, part of the ecclesiastical province of Gniezno, from the northwestern part of the territory of the Apostolic Administration of Kamień, Lubusz and the Prelature of Piła, previously part of the Diocese of Berlin in Germany
- March 25, 1992: Promoted as Metropolitan Archdiocese of Szczecin – Kamień

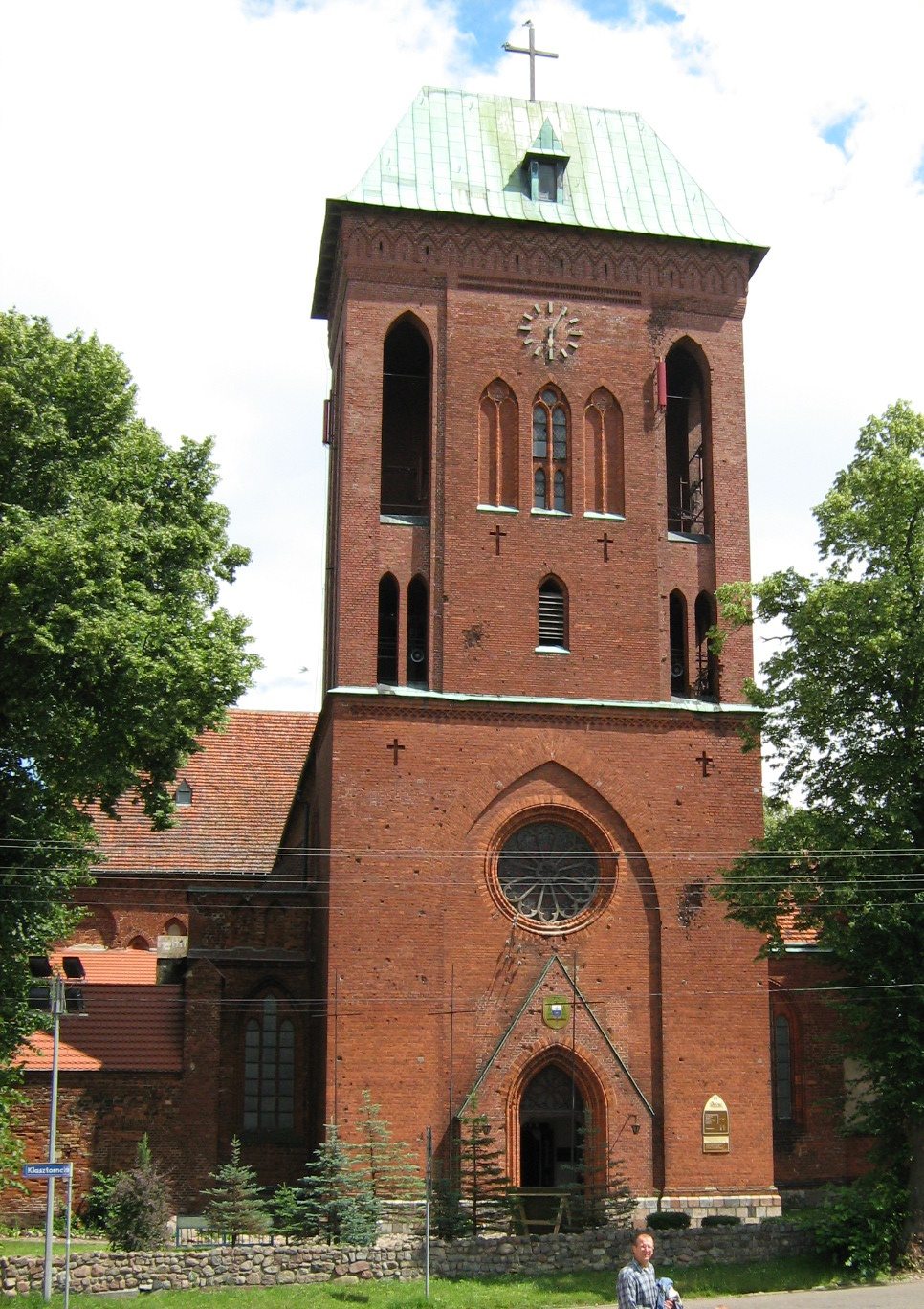
Co-Cathedral of St John the Baptist in Kamień Pomorski

== Leadership ==
- Archbishop Jerzy Stroba (28 Jun 1972 – 21 Sep 1978; appointed Archbishop of Poznań)
- Archbishop Kazimierz Jan Majdański (1 Mar 1979 – 25 Mar 1992)
- Archbishop Marian Przykucki (25 Mar 1992 – 1 May 1999)
- Archbishop Zygmunt Kamiński (1 May 1999 – 21 Feb 2009)
- Archbishop Andrzej Dzięga (21 Feb 2009 – 24 Feb 2024)
- Archbishop Wiesław Śmigiel (13 September 2024 – present)

== Suffragan dioceses ==
- Koszalin-Kołobrzeg
- Zielona Góra-Gorzów

== See also ==
- Roman Catholicism in Poland

== Sources ==
- GCatholic.org
- Catholic Hierarchy
- Diocese website
