= Szczecin Cathedral =

Gothic cathedral located in Poland

St. James the Apostle Archcathedral Basilica
- Bazylika Archikatedralna św. Jakuba Apostoła
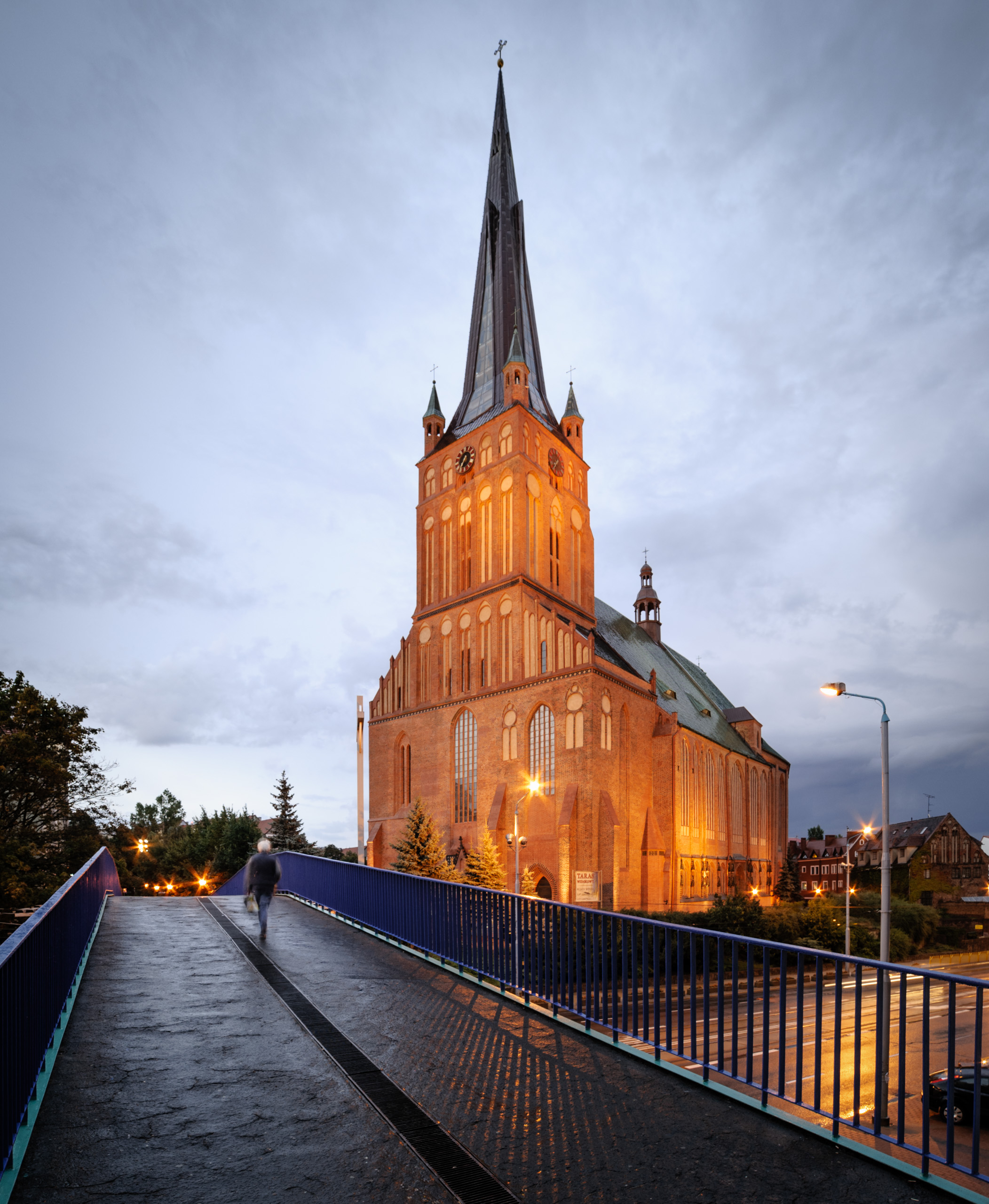
- Front view at dusk

Religion
- Affiliation: Catholic
- District: Old Town
- Province: Archdiocese of Szczecin-Kamień

Location
- Location: Szczecin, Poland
- Interactive map of St. James the Apostle Archcathedral Basilica
- Coordinates: 53.425°N 14.555°E

Architecture
- Style: Gothic, neo-baroque
- Completed: 14th century
- Height (max): 110.18 meters

The St. James the Apostle Archcathedral Basilica (Polish: Bazylika archikatedralna św. Jakuba Apostoła; German: Basilika und Erzkathedrale St. Jakobus) is a Gothic cathedral located in Szczecin, Poland and seat of the Archdiocese of Szczecin-Kamień. Built in the 12th-14th centuries, it is the second tallest church in Poland, the largest church in the region of Western Pomerania, and one of the most distinctive landmarks of the Szczecin Old Town.

== History ==
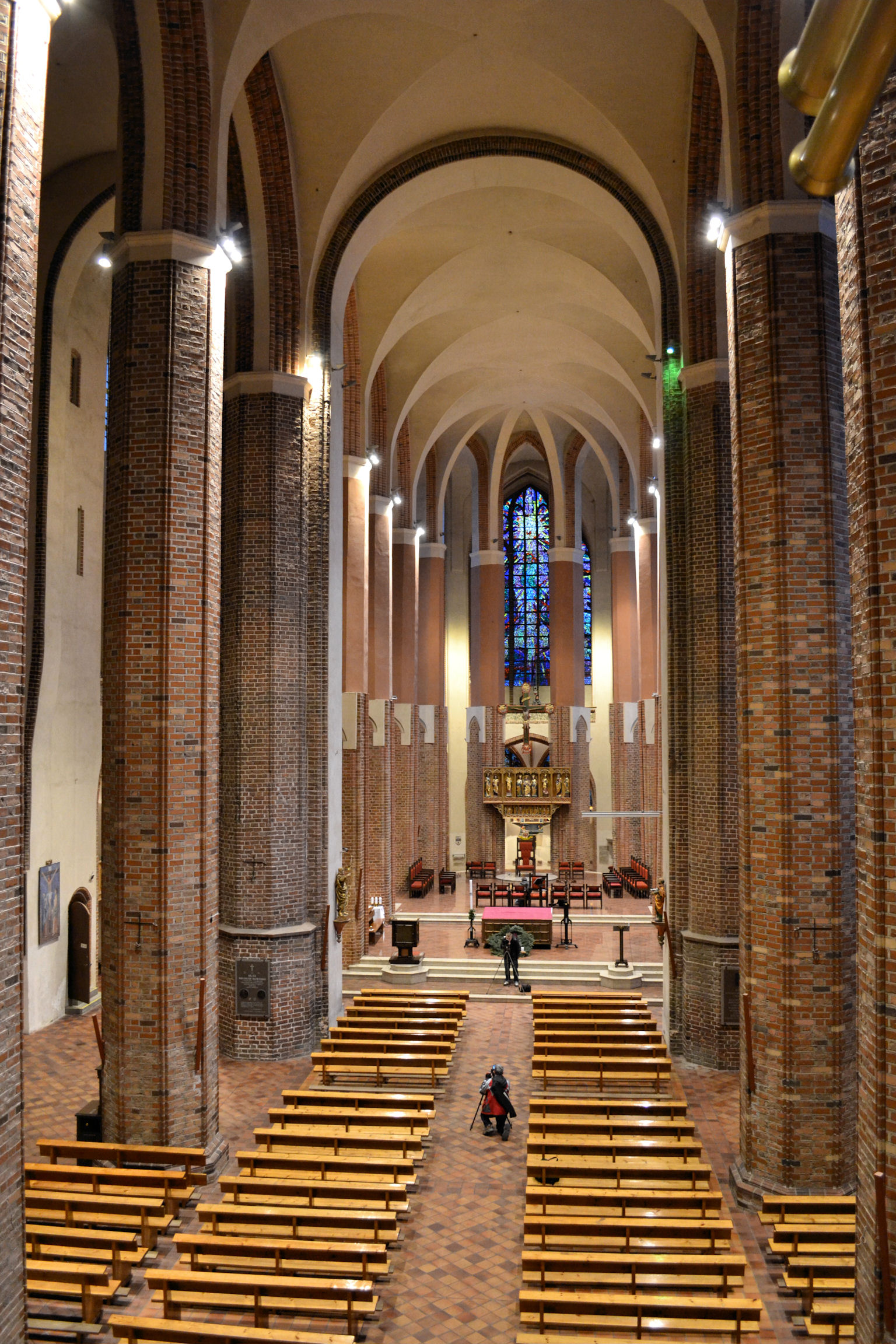
Interior

The church was established in 1187 and the Romanesque-style building was completed in the 14th century. The church was built by the citizens of the city and modeled after the Church of St. Mary in Lübeck. In ca. 1220 Pomeranian Duke Bogislaw II was buried in the cathedral. One of its two towers collapsed during a storm in 1456 and destroyed part of the church. Reconstruction lasted until 1503 and the entire church was remodelled based on a single-tower hall church design. After the Reformation, it was part of the Pomeranian Evangelical Church.

The church was destroyed again in 1677 during the Scanian War and rebuilt between 1690 and 1693 in the Baroque style. In 1893, the church was remodelled again however, the west tower collapsed during a storm in 1894 and had to be rebuilt. This renovation was completed in 1901 leaving the church with a spire of 119 metres (390 feet).

Air raids on the night of 16 August 1944 during World War II resulted in collapse of the spire added in 1901 and extensive damage to other parts of the building. The north wall, all altars and artworks inside were destroyed by the bombs and ensuing fire. Following the war, government officials were reluctant to allow reconstruction of the church however, a heritage conservator pointed out that demolition of the remaining structure would be more costly than rebuilding it. In 1971, work began on the church and continued for three years. The north wall was reconstructed in a modern style which did not harmonize with the rest of the building and the tower was stabilized, but the spire was not rebuilt. Instead, the tower was capped with a short hip roof or pyramid roof resulting in a height of 60 metres (196 feet). After World War II, it became once again a Roman Catholic church.

In 2006, another renovation commenced which included new heating systems and flooring. Organs, to replace those removed before the World War II bombing and never recovered, were constructed and the tower was strengthened so it could support a redesigned spire. In 2010, a new, neo-baroque Flèche has been constructed. Today, the church serves as the cathedral of the Archdiocese of Szczecin-Kamień.

== Gallery ==
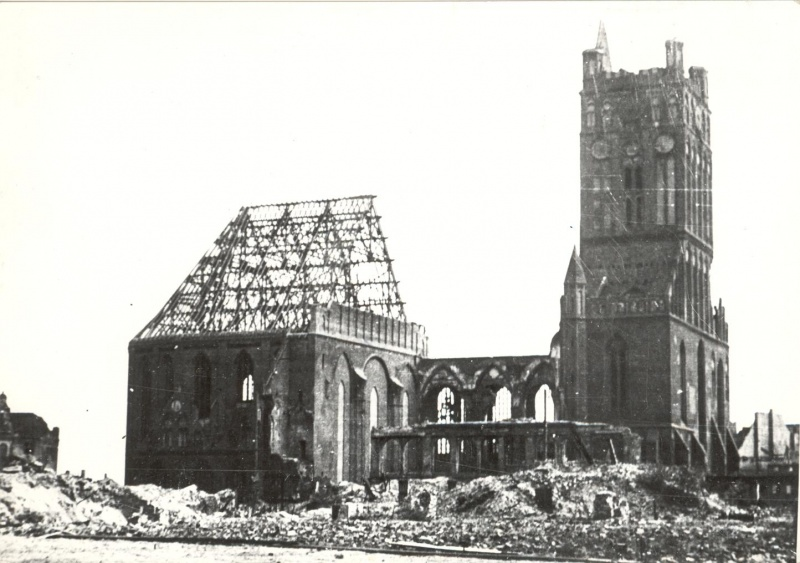
Cathedral ruins after World War II

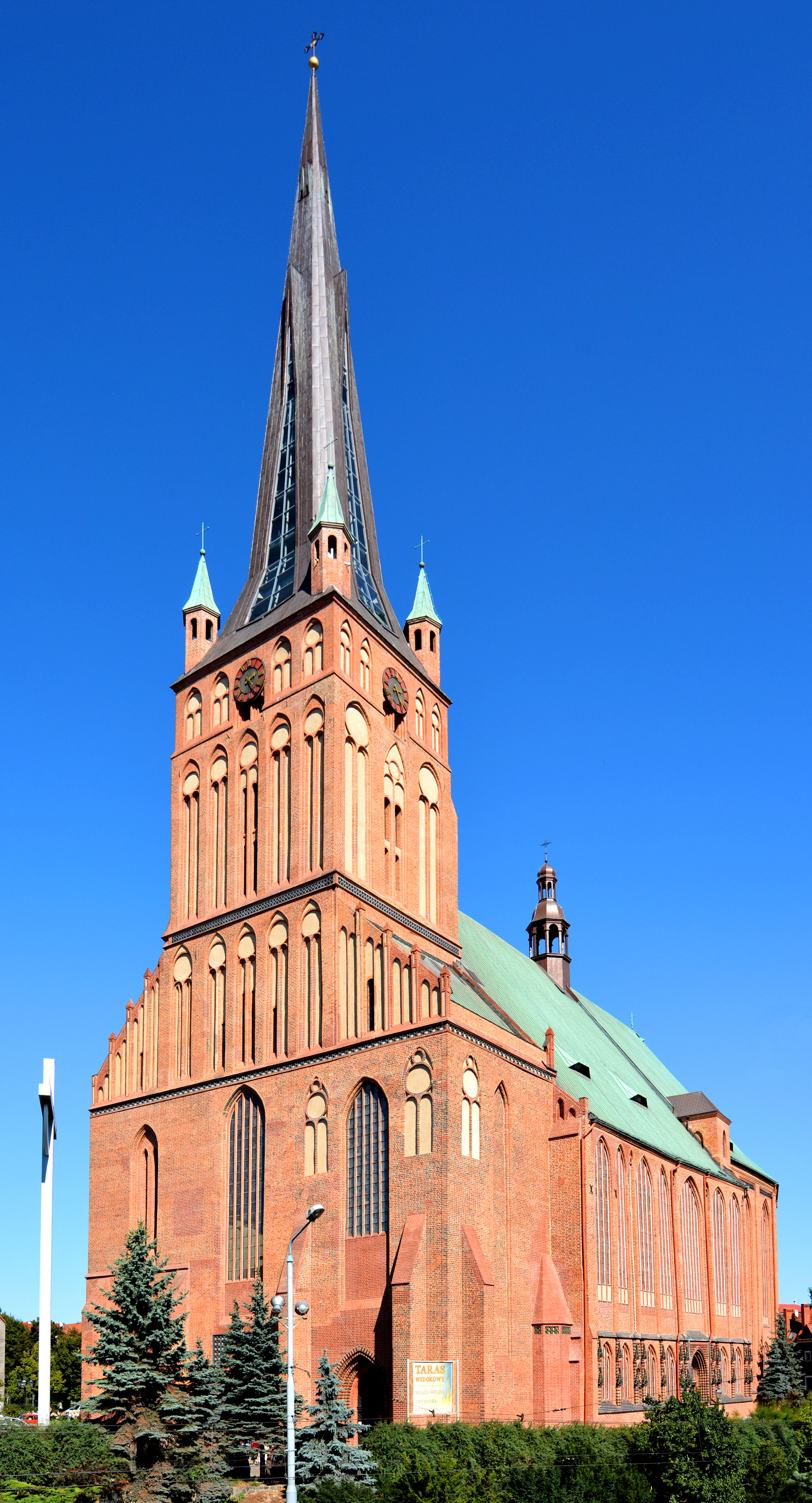
Church of St. James in Szczecin (2013)

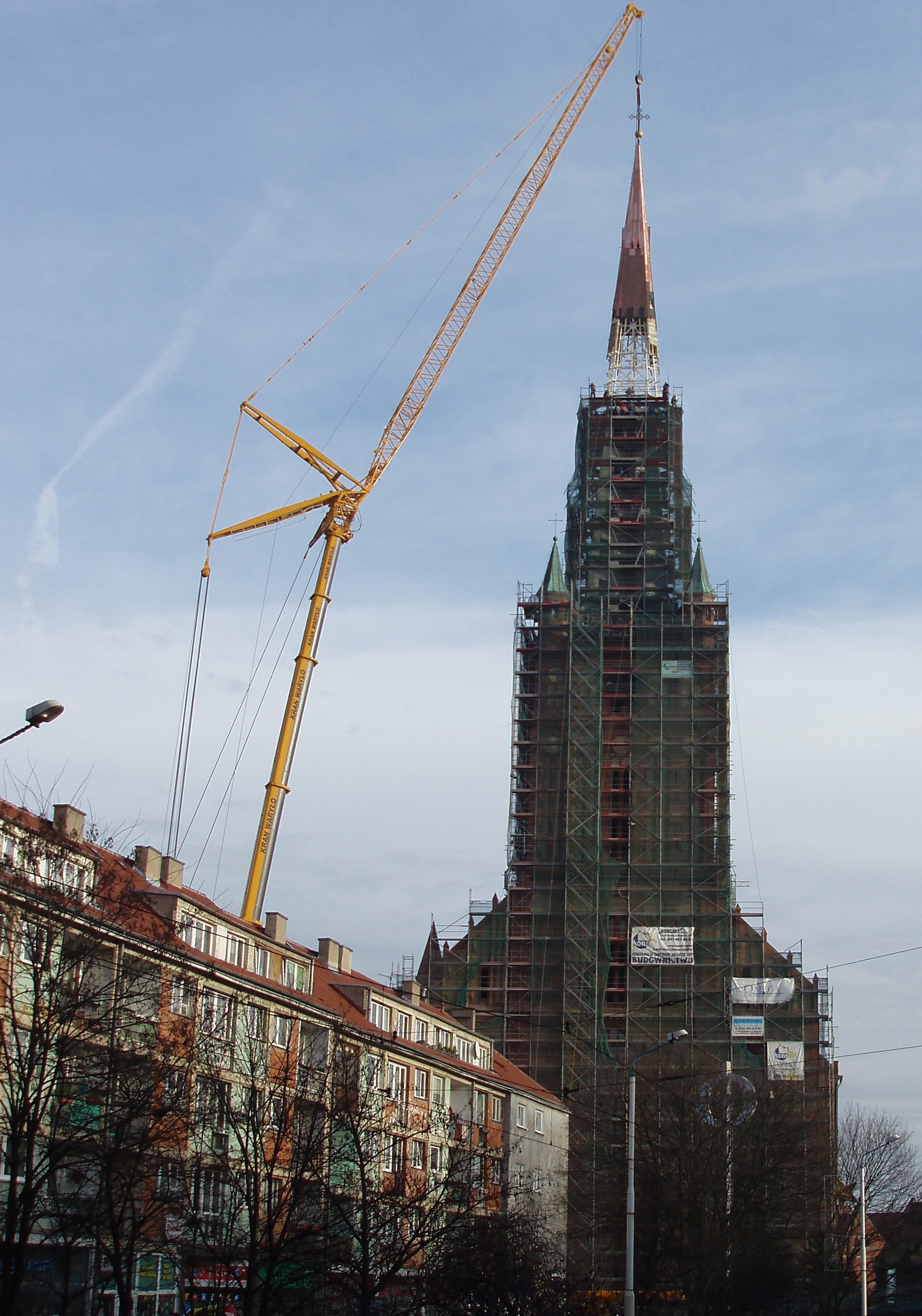
The church in January 2008, during the final stages of tower reconstruction, when the spire was added

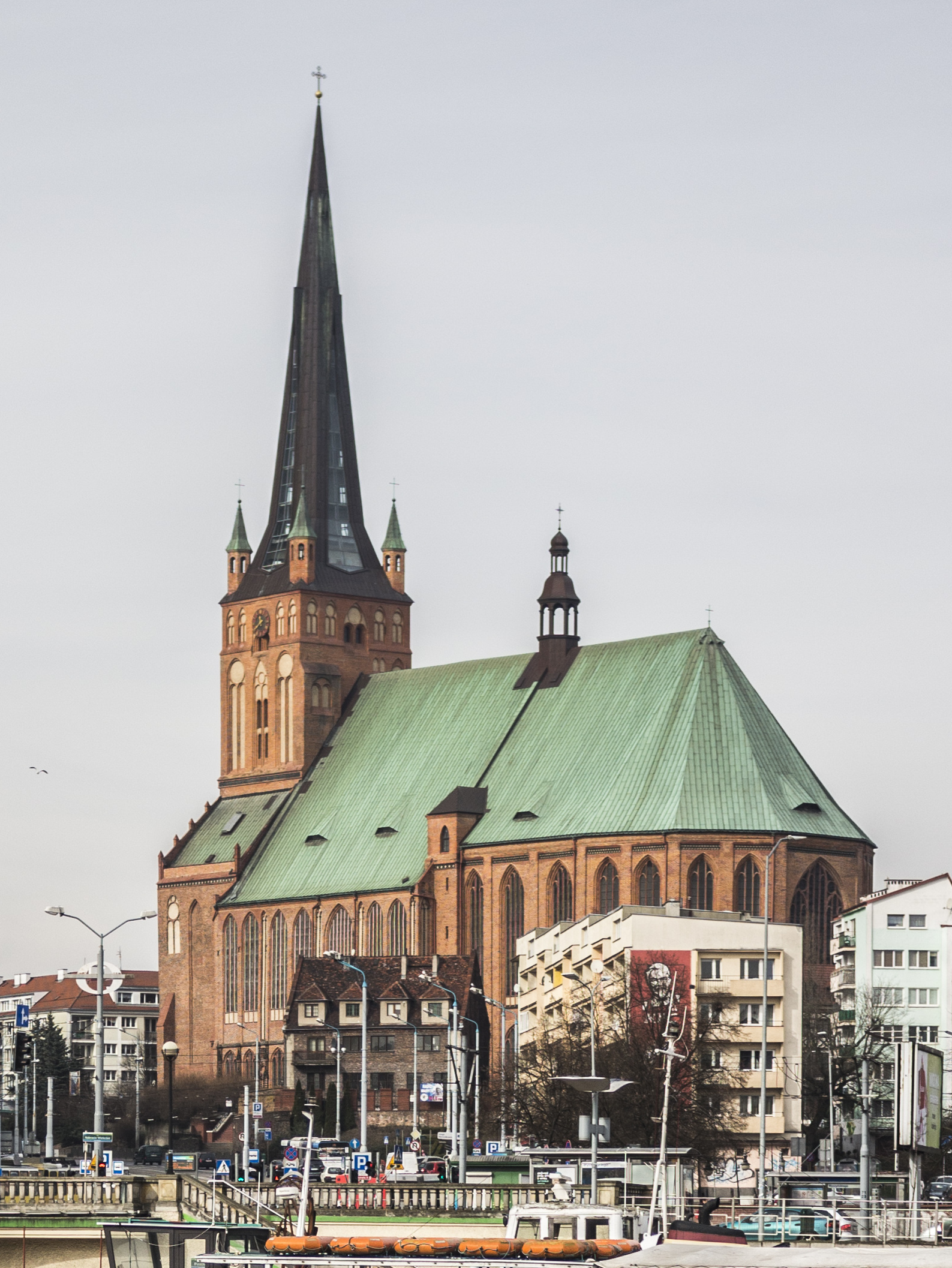
Another view of the Cathedral

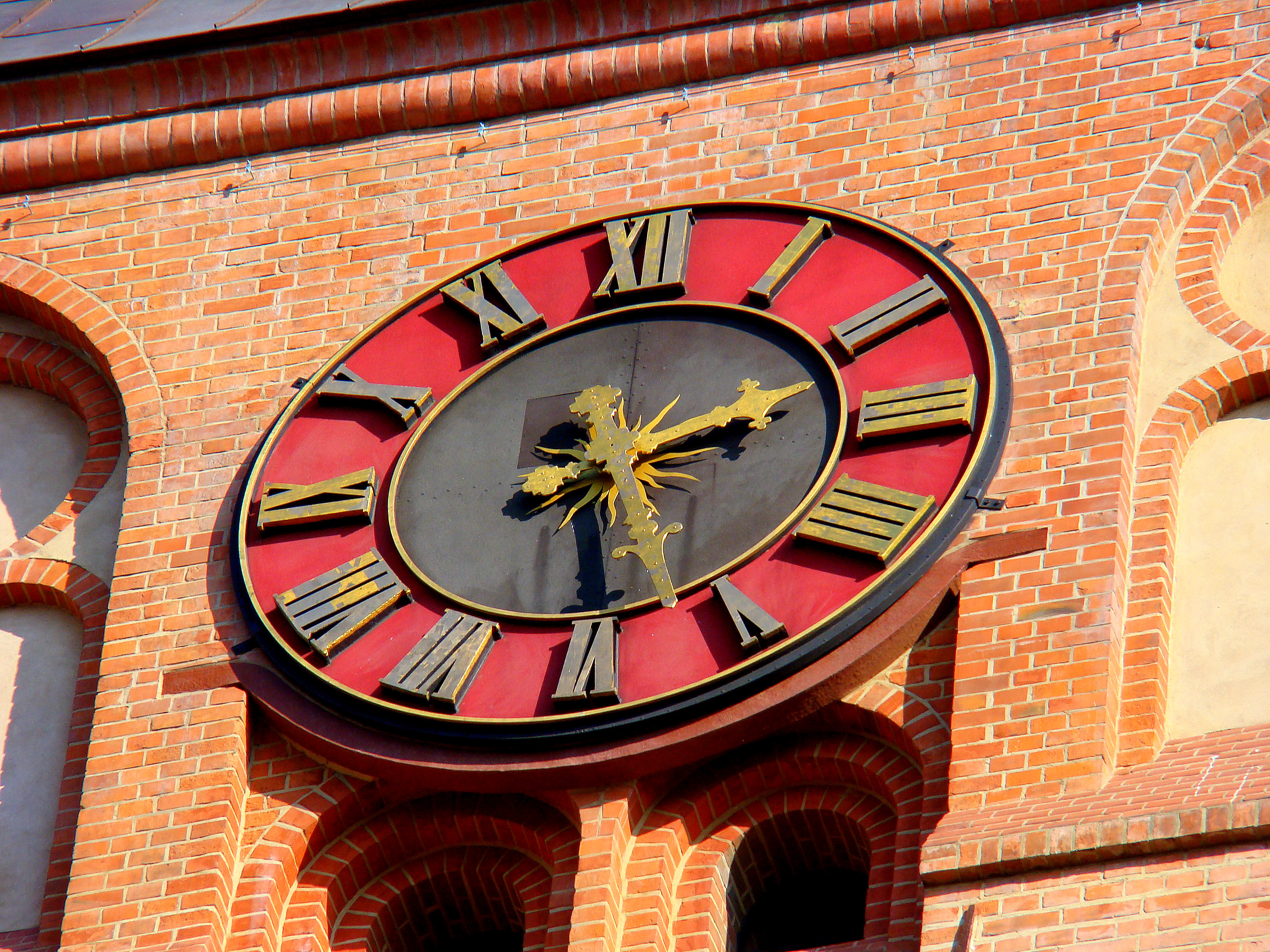
Clock

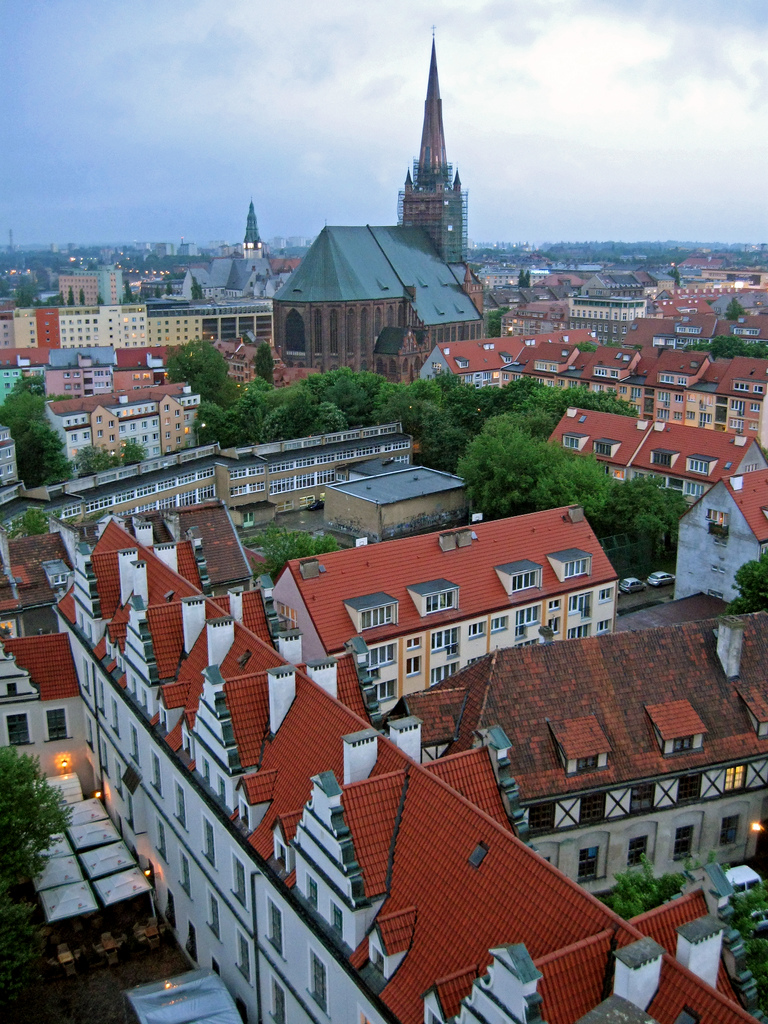
View from Old Town
