= Andrzej Suski =

Polish Roman Catholic bishop (born 1941)

- Bishop Emeritus of Toruń
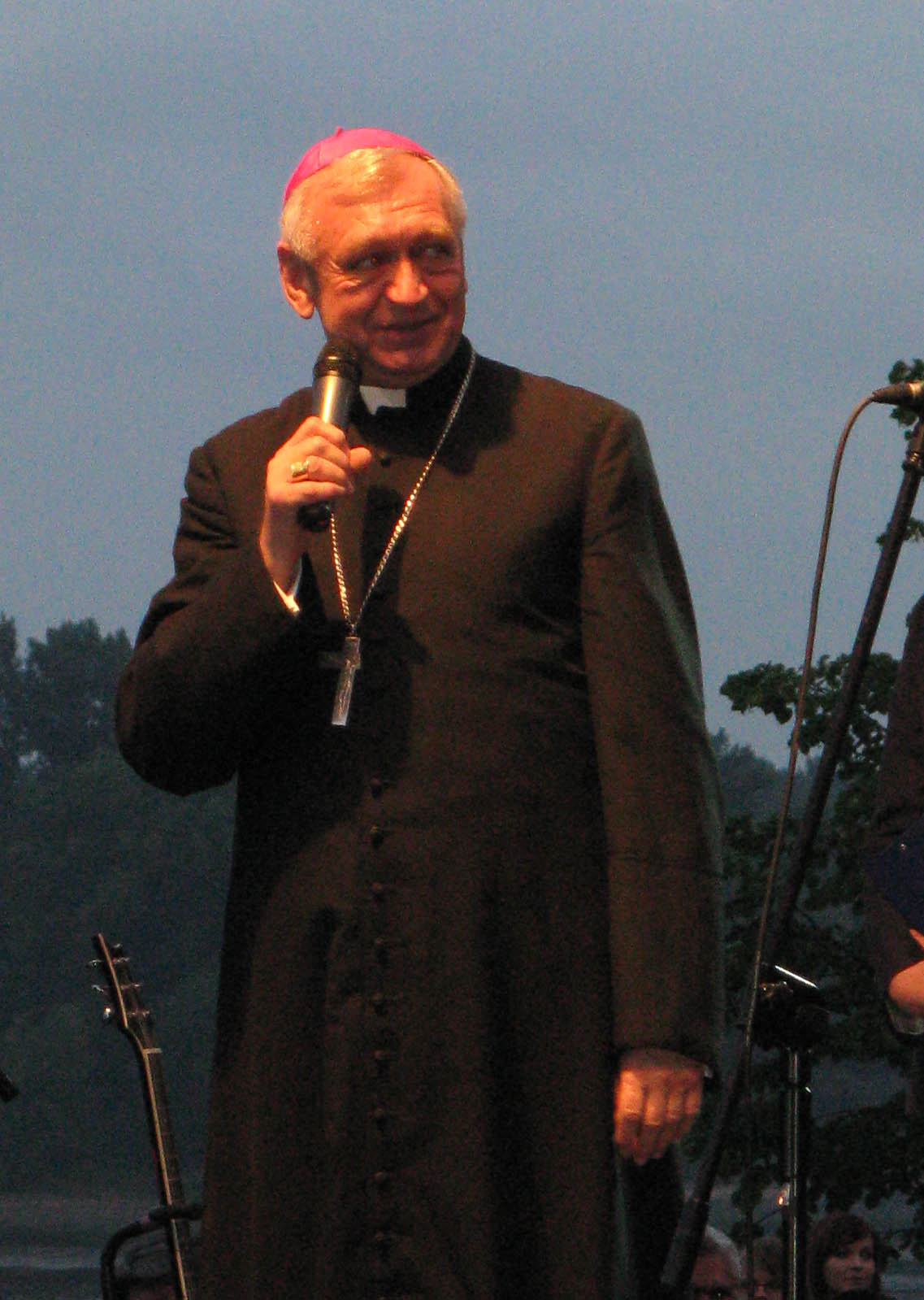
- Suski in June 2008
- Church: Roman Catholic Church
- Province: Gdańsk
- In office: 19 March 1992 – 11 November 2017
- Previous posts: Titular Bishop of Pulcheriopolis (1986-1992); Auxiliary Bishop of Płock (1986-1992)

Orders
- Ordination: 13 June 1965 by Piotr Dudziec
- Consecration: 4 October 1986 by Józef Glemp
- Rank: Bishop

Personal details
- Born: 24 December 1941 (age 84) Płock, Poland
- Motto: Spes mea unica
- Coat of arms

Andrzej Wojciech Suski (born 24 December 1941) is a retired Polish Roman Catholic prelate.

Born in Płock, Suski was ordained to the priesthood in 1965. He served as Auxiliary Bishop of Płock from 1986 to 1992, when he became the Bishop of Toruń. He retired in November 2017.
