= Archdiocese of Gniezno =

Roman Catholic archdiocese in Poland

Coordinates: 52°32′14″N 17°35′49″E

Archdiocese of Gniezno Archidioecesis Gnesnensis Archidiecezja Gnieźnieńska

Catholic
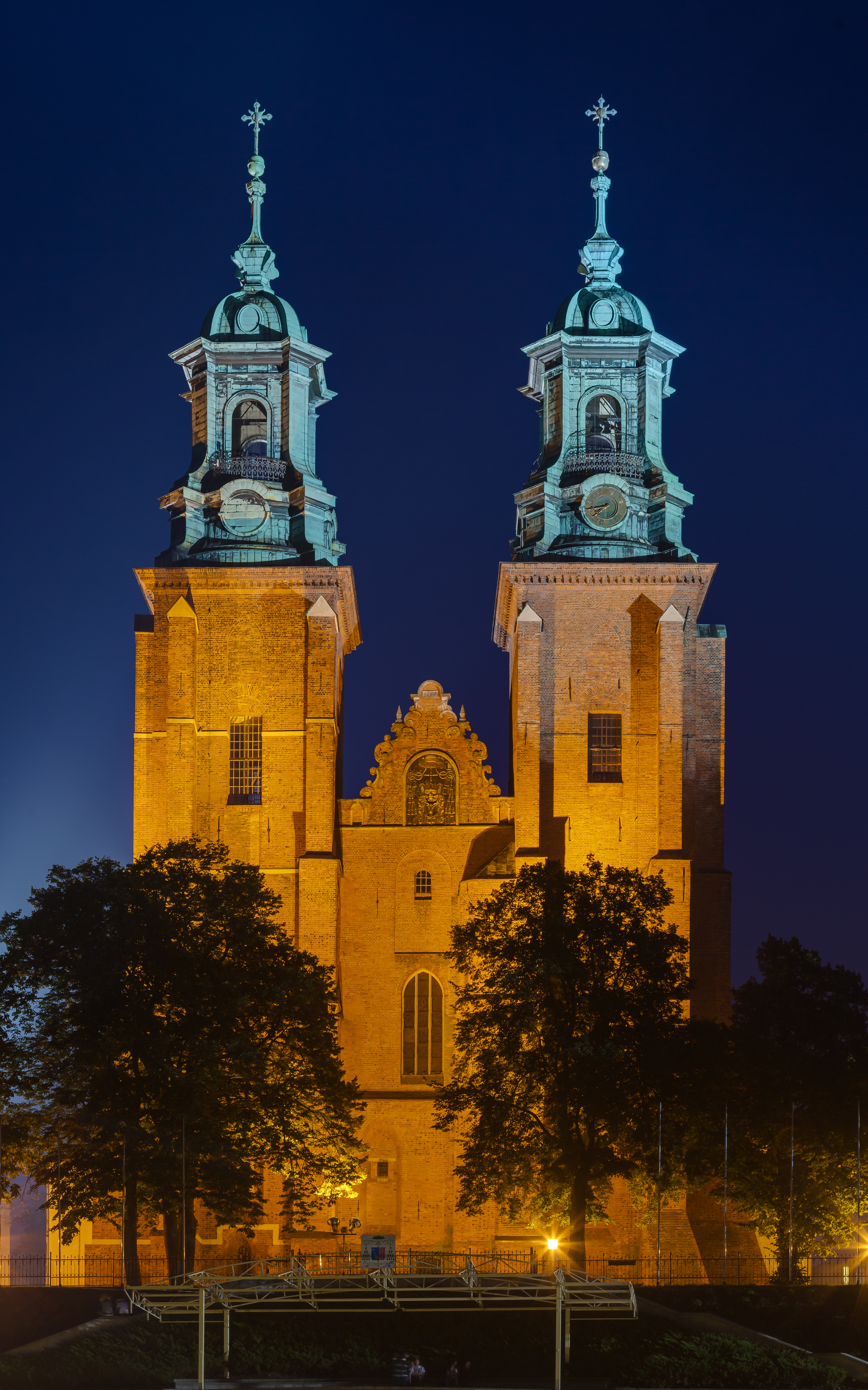
- Cathedral Basilica of the Assumption in Gniezno

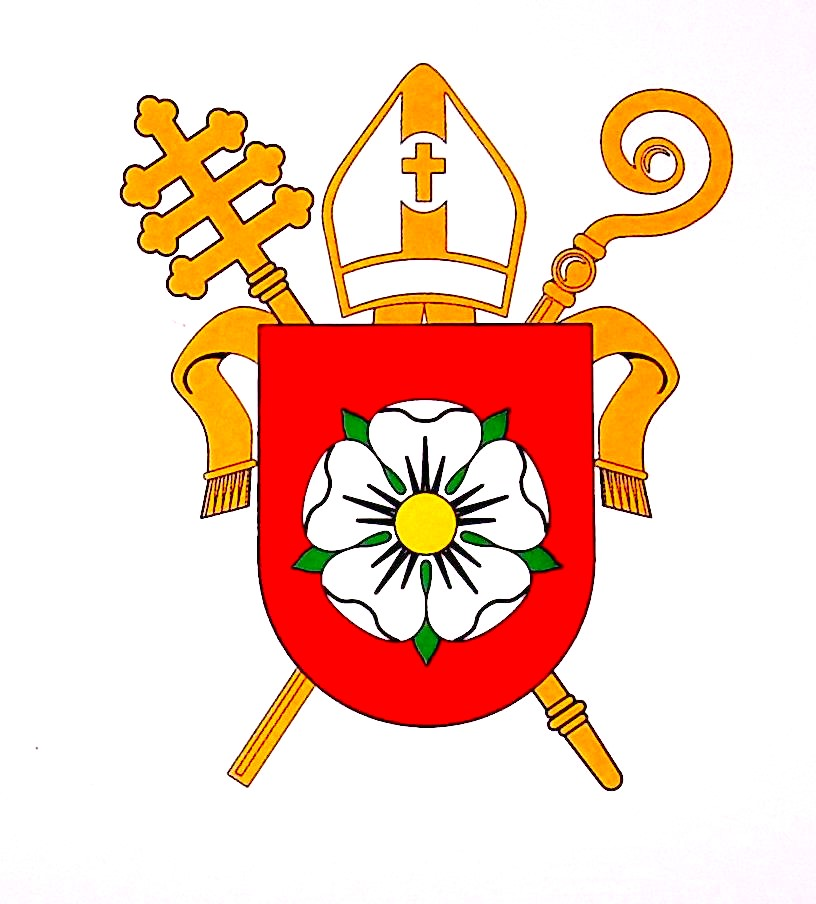
- Coat of arms

Location
- Country: Poland

Statistics
- Area: 8,122 km^{2} (3,136 sq mi)
- Population: Total; Catholics: (as of 2021); 661,970; 641,082 (96.8%)

Information
- Denomination: Catholic
- Sui iuris church: Latin Church
- Rite: Roman Rite
- Cathedral: Cathedral Basilica of the Assumption of the Blessed Virgin Mary

Current leadership
- Pope: Leo XIV
- Archbishop: Wojciech Polak
- Auxiliary Bishops: Radosław Orchowicz
- Bishops emeritus: Henryk Muszyński

Map

Website
- archidiecezja.pl

The Archdiocese of Gniezno (Latin: Archidioecesis Gnesnensis, Polish: Archidiecezja Gnieźnieńska) is the oldest Latin Catholic archdiocese in Poland, located in the city of Gniezno. The ecclesiastical province comprises the suffragan dioceses of Bydgoszcz and Włocławek.

== History ==
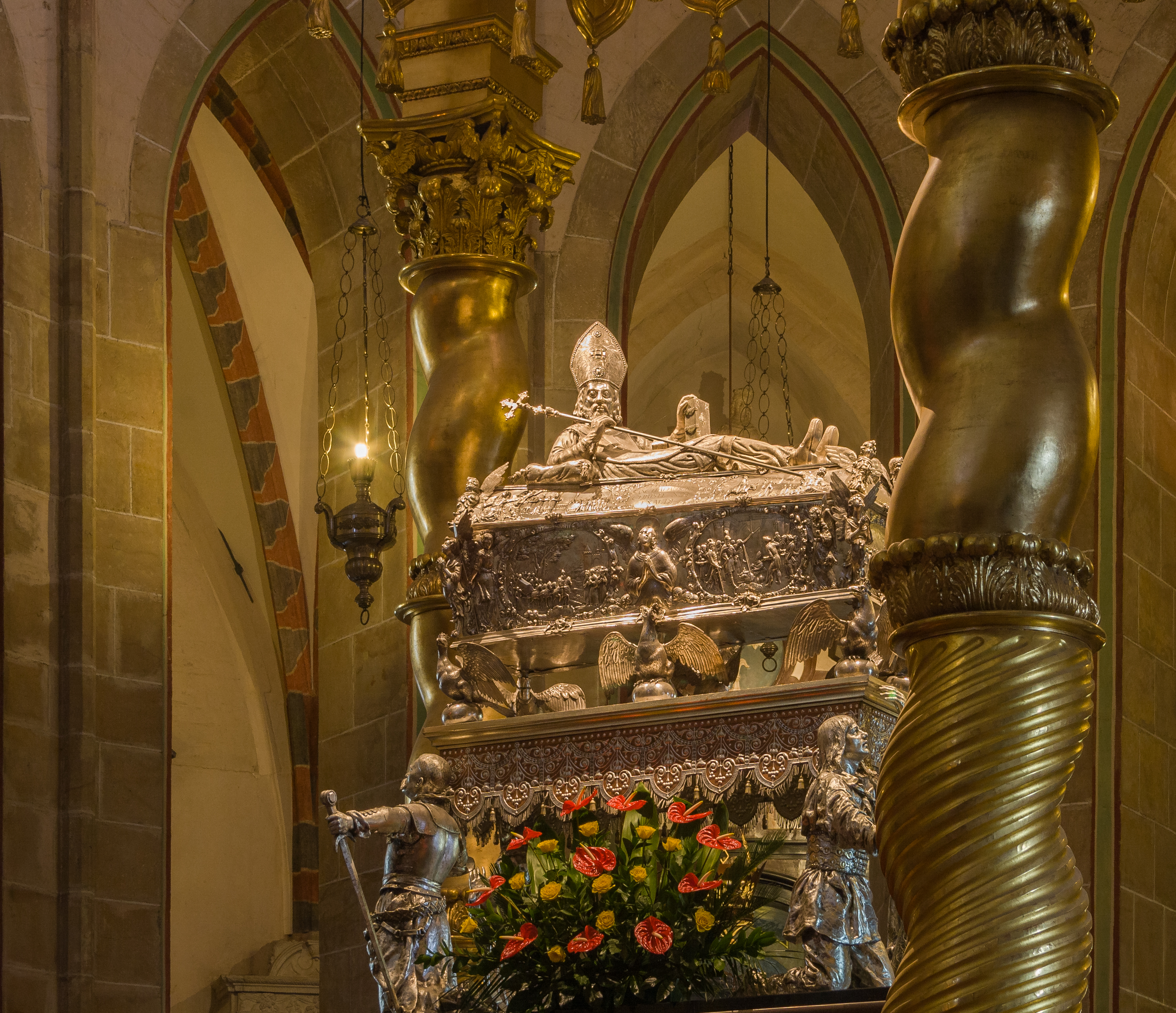
Relics of St Adalbert, Gniezno Cathedral

The Metropolitan Archdiocese of Gniezno was established in 1000 AD on the initiative of the Polish duke Bolesław I the Brave. He had the relics of the missionary and martyr Adalbert of Prague (Wojciech) transferred to Gniezno Cathedral, which soon became a major pilgrimage site. Here Bolesław met with Emperor Otto III in the Congress of Gniezno, where the duke obtained investiture rights and created the Gniezno archbishopric, superseding the older Diocese of Poznań. Led by Adalbert's half-brother Radim Gaudentius, the ecclesiastical province then comprised the suffragan dioceses in Kraków, Wrocław, and Kołobrzeg (extinct in 1015), and from about 1075 also Poznań.

The position of the archbishops and their suffragans was confirmed in the 1136 Bull of Gniezno issued by Pope Innocent II. The Gniezno metropolitans held the right to crown the Kings of Poland and in 1412 obtained the status of a Primate of Poland. From 1572, they acted as interrex regents of the Polish–Lithuanian Commonwealth.

When on 16 July 1821 the Diocese of Wrocław was put under direct authority of the Holy See by Pope Pius VII, Gniezno was affiliated in personal union (aeque principaliter) with the Archdiocese of Poznań. The union of Poznań and Gniezno was again dissolved with effect from 12 November 1948, when a personal union (in persona episcopi) between the Archdiocese of Warsaw and Gniezno was established. By Apostolic constitution of 25 March 1992, Pope John Paul II again divided the union between the archdioceses of Gniezno and Warsaw.

== Special churches ==
- Minor Basilicas:
  - Bazylika św. Apostołów Piotra i Pawła, Kruszwica
  - Bazylika Wniebowzięcia Najświętszej Marii Panny, Trzemeszno

== Leadership ==
- List of archbishops of Gniezno and primates of Poland

== Suffragan dioceses ==
- Bydgoszcz, established in 2004
- Włocławek, established about 1015 (split off Kołobrzeg as Diocese of Kujawy–Pomorze), interrupted 1818–1925 (then suffragan of Warsaw as Diocese of Kujawy–Kalisz)

=== Former suffragans ===
- Diocese of Krakow, 1000–1807, became suffragan of Lwów (Lviv), suffragan of Warsaw from 1818 to 1880, raised to archbishopric in 1925
- Diocese of Wrocław, 1000–1821 (exempt), raised to archbishopric in 1930
- Diocese of Kołobrzeg, 1000–1007 (Bishop Reinbern), re-established as suffragan diocese of Koszalin-Kołobrzeg in 1972, became suffragan of Szczecin-Kamień in 1992
- Diocese of Poznań, 1075–1821, raised to archbishopric, in personal union with Gniezno until 1946
- Diocese of Płock, 1075–1818, suffragan of Warsaw
- Diocese of Lubusz (Lebus), established about 1125, suffragan of Magdeburg from 1424, secularised in 1598
- Diocese of Vilnius, 1388–1798, raised to archbishopric in 1926
- Diocese of Samogitia, established in 1427, dissolved in 1798, re-established in 1849, raised to archbishopric (Archdiocese of Kaunas) in 1926
- Diocese of Warsaw, 1798-1813, raised to archbishopric, in personal union with Gniezno 1946-1992
- Diocese of Chełmno, 1821–1992, de facto already joining Gniezno councils since 1566, replaced by the Diocese of Pelplin, suffragan of Gdańsk (see below)
- Diocese of Łuck (Lutsk), 16th century, united with Diocese of Kyiv–Černihiv in 1798
- Diocese of Inflanty (Wenden), 1621–1798
- Diocese of Smolensk, 1636–1783, merged into Archdiocese of Mohilev in 1818
- Diocese of Gdańsk, established in 1925 (exempt), suffragan of Gniezno from 1972, raised to archbishopric in 1992
- Diocese of Szczecin-Kamień, established in 1972, raised to archbishopric in 1992

== See also ==
- Roman Catholicism in Poland
