= Wacław Paprocki =

Roman Catholic bishop (??–1643)

Most Reverend Wacław Paprocki
- Titular Bishop of Margarita; Auxiliary Bishop of Włocławek
- Church: Catholic Church
- In office: 1639–1643

Orders
- Consecration: 18 Sep 1639 by Maciej Łubieński

Personal details
- Died: 1643

Wacław Paprocki (died 1643) was a Roman Catholic prelate who served as Auxiliary Bishop of Włocławek (1639–1643) and Titular Bishop of Margarita (1639–1643).

== Biography ==
On 11 Apr 1639, he was appointed during the papacy of Pope Urban VIII as Auxiliary Bishop of Włocławek and Titular Bishop of Margarita. On 18 Sep 1639, he was consecrated bishop by Maciej Łubieński, Bishop of Włocławek. He served as Bishop of Włocławek until his death in 1643.

== External links and additional sources ==
- Cheney, David M. "Diocese of Włocławek (Kujawy, Kalisze)". Catholic-Hierarchy.org. (for Chronology of Bishops) ^{[self-published]}
- Chow, Gabriel. "Diocese of Włocławek (Poland)". GCatholic.org. (for Chronology of Bishops) ^{[self-published]}
- Cheney, David M. "Mactaris (Titular See)". Catholic-Hierarchy.org. (for Chronology of Bishops) ^{[self-published]}
- Chow, Gabriel. "Titular Episcopal See of Mactaris (Tunisia)". GCatholic.org. (for Chronology of Bishops) ^{[self-published]}

Catholic Church titles
Preceded by	Auxiliary Bishop of Włocławek; 1639–1643	Succeeded by
Preceded by Krzysztof Charbicki	Titular Bishop of Margarita; 1639–1643	Succeeded by Piotr Mieszkowski (starszy)
