= Żukowo Zachodnie railway station =

Railway station in Żukowo, Poland

Coordinates: 54°20′N 18°21′E

Żukowo Zachodnie
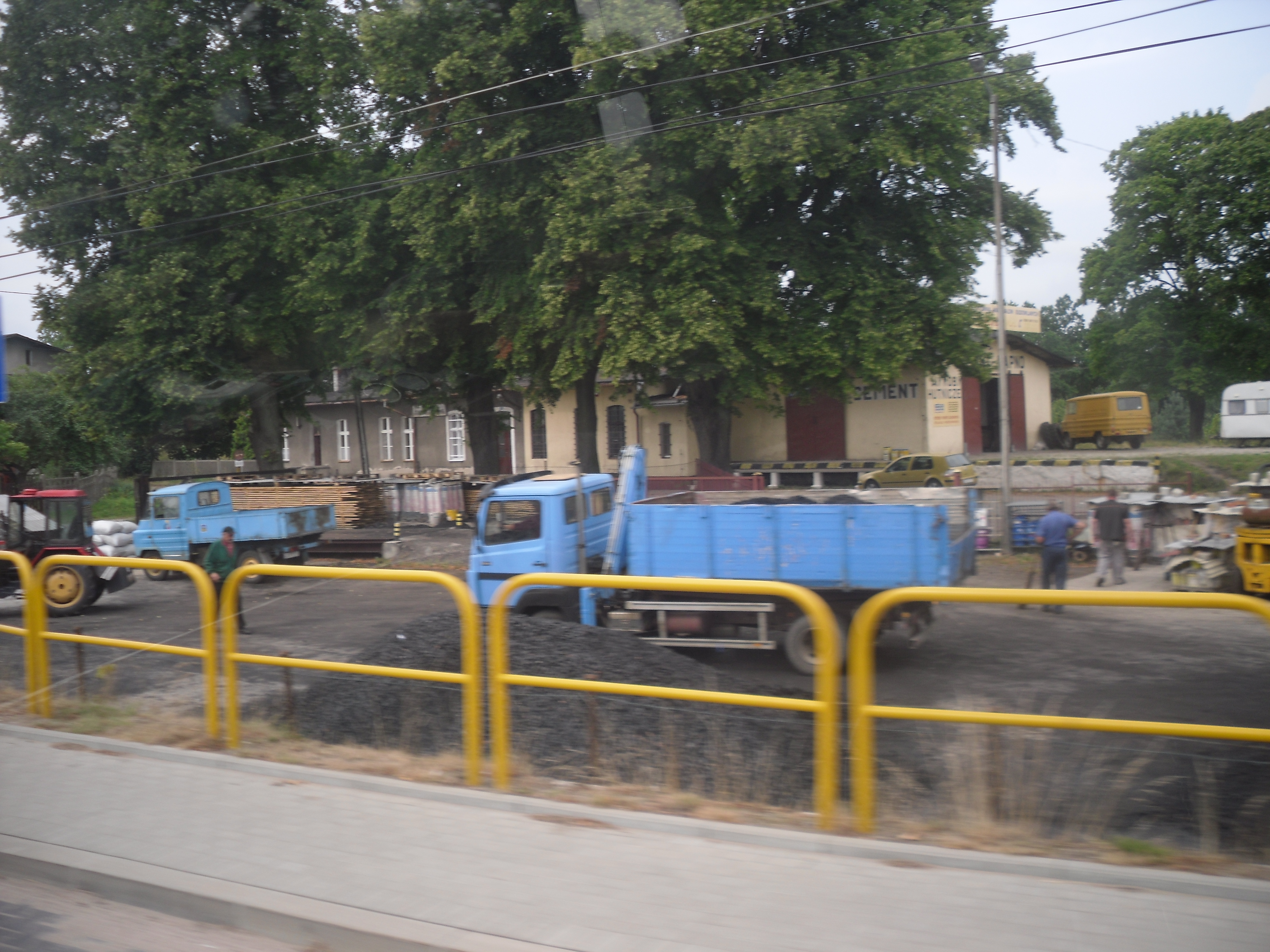
- Żukowo Zachodnie railway station

General information
- Location: Żukowo; Poland
- Owner: Polskie Koleje Państwowe S.A.
- Platforms: 2

Construction
- Structure type: Building: Yes (no longer used); Depot: No; Water tower: No

History
- Former names: Zuckau West until 1945
Location

Żukowo Zachodnie is a non-operational PKP railway station in Żukowo (Pomeranian Voivodeship), Poland.

== Lines crossing the station ==
Start station	End station	Line type
Pruszcz Gdański	Łeba	Freight
