= Franciszek Zajerski =

Roman Catholic prelate

Most Reverend Franciszek Zajerski
- Auxiliary Bishop of Lutsk; Titular Bishop of Argos
- Church: Catholic Church
- Diocese: Diocese of Lutsk
- In office: 1622–1631

Personal details
- Died: 1631 Lutsk, Ukraine

Franciszek Zajerski (died 1631) was a Roman Catholic prelate who served as Auxiliary Bishop of Lutsk (1622–1631) and Titular Bishop of Argos (1622–1631).

== Biography ==
On 21 Feb 1622, Franciszek Zajerski was appointed during the papacy of Pope Gregory XV as Auxiliary Bishop of Lutsk and Titular Bishop of Argos. On 9 Oct 1622, he was consecrated bishop by Paweł Wołucki, Bishop of Włocławek, with Baltazar Miaskowski, Titular Bishop of Margarita, and Stanislaw Starczewski, Titular Bishop of Lacedaemonia, serving as co-consecrators. He served as Auxiliary Bishop of Lutsk until his death in 1631.

== See also ==
- Catholic Church in Ukraine

== External links and additional sources ==
- Cheney, David M. "Diocese of Lutsk". Catholic-Hierarchy.org. (for Chronology of Bishops) ^{[self-published]}
- Chow, Gabriel. "Diocese of Lutsk (Ukraine)". GCatholic.org. (for Chronology of Bishops) ^{[self-published]}
- Cheney, David M. "Argos (Titular See)". Catholic-Hierarchy.org. (for Chronology of Bishops) ^{[self-published]}
- Chow, Gabriel. "Titular Episcopal See of Argos (Greece)". GCatholic.org. (for Chronology of Bishops) ^{[self-published]}

Catholic Church titles
Preceded by Louis du Chaine	Titular Bishop of Argos; 1622–1631	Succeeded by Stanisław Łoza
Preceded by	Auxiliary Bishop of Lutsk; 1622–1631	Succeeded by
