= Bronisław Dembowski =

Polish priest (1927–2019)

- Bishop of Włocławek
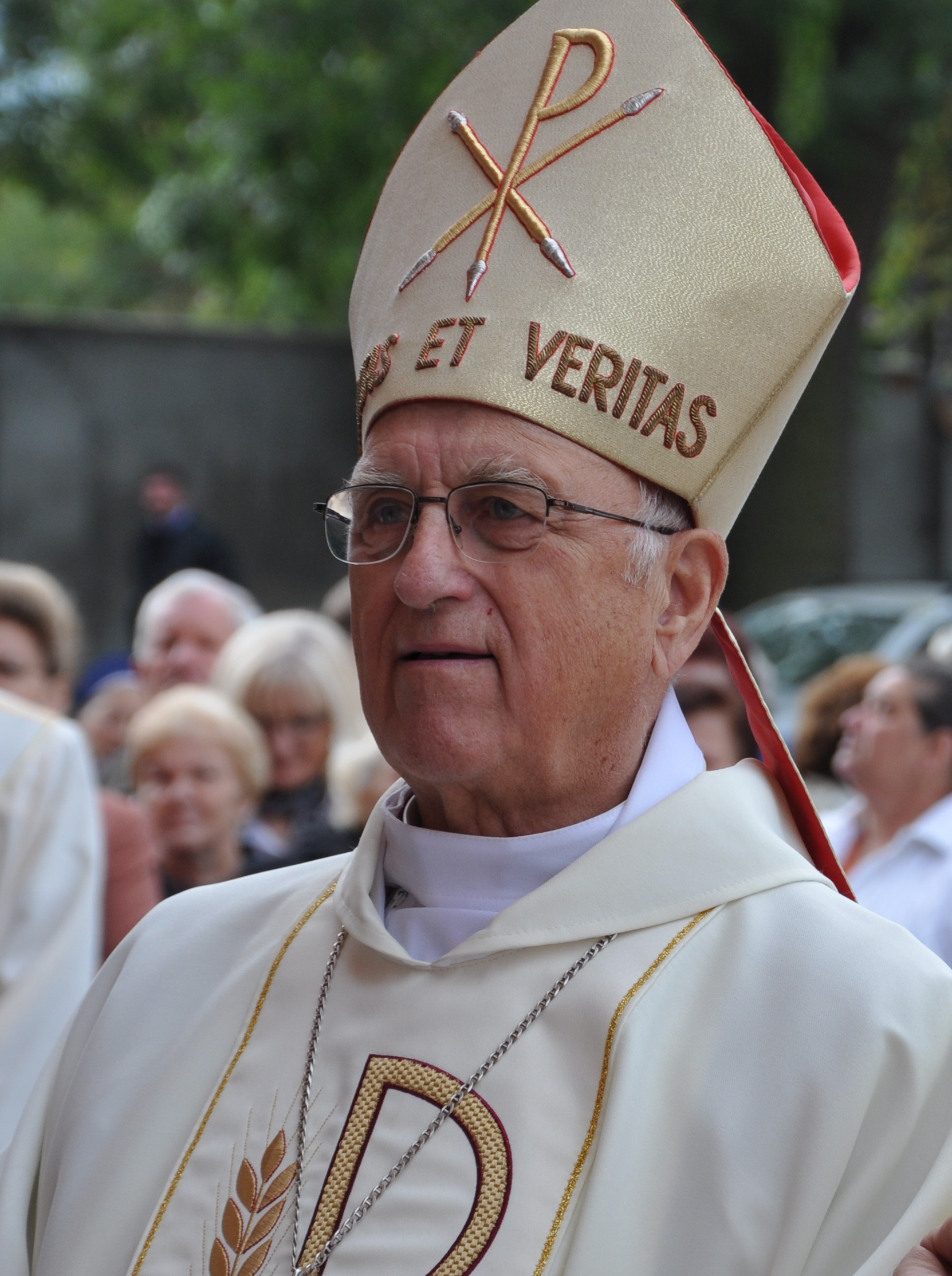
- Church: Catholic Church
- Diocese: Diocese of Włocławek
- In office: 25 March 1992 – 25 March 2003
- Predecessor: Henryk Muszyński
- Successor: Wiesław Mering

Orders
- Ordination: 23 August 1953 by Stefan Wyszyński
- Consecration: 20 April 1992 by Henryk Muszyński

Personal details
- Born: 2 October 1927 Komorowo, Białystok Voivodeship, Poland
- Died: 16 November 2019 (aged 92)

Bronisław Jan Maria Dembowski (2 October 1927 – 16 November 2019) was a Polish Catholic bishop.

Dembowski was born in Poland and was ordained to the priesthood in 1953. He served as the bishop of the Diocese of Włocławek, Poland, from 1992 to 2003.

He became the spiritual father of Catholic Charismatic Renewal in Poland.
