= Wojciech Stawowski =

Polish Roman Catholic prelate

Most Reverend Wojciech Stawowski
- Auxiliary Bishop of Gniezno; Titular Bishop of Petra in Palaestina
- Church: Catholic Church
- Archdiocese: Archdiocese of Gniezno
- In office: 1676–1693

Personal details
- Born: 1625
- Died: 20 Jun 1693 (age 68) Gniezno, Poland

Wojciech Stawowski (1625 – 20 Jun 1693) was a Roman Catholic prelate who served as Auxiliary Bishop of Gniezno (1676–1693).

== Biography ==
Wojciech Stawowski was born in 1525. On 23 Mar 1676, he was appointed during the papacy of Pope Clement X as Auxiliary Bishop of Gniezno and Titular Bishop of Petra in Palaestina. In 1676, he was consecrated bishop by Andrzej Olszowski, Archbishop of Gniezno. He served as Auxiliary Bishop of Gniezno until his death on 20 Jun 1693. While bishop, he was the principal co-consecrator of Piotr Mieszkowski (młodszy), Auxiliary Bishop of Włocławek (1679); and Tomasz Bogoria Skotnicki, Auxiliary Bishop of Chelmno (1686).
