= Curtio Palumbo =

17th-century Roman Catholic bishop

Most Reverend Curtio Palumbo
- Titular Bishop of Margarita
- Church: Catholic Church
- Predecessor: Balthasar Miaskowski
- Successor: Krzysztof Charbicki

Personal details
- Born: Naples, Italy

Curtio Palumbo or Curzio Palumbo was a Roman Catholic prelate who served as Titular Bishop of Margarita (1622–?).

== Biography ==
Curtio Palumbo was born in Naples, Italy. In 1604, he served as vicar general of the Archdiocese of Naples after the death of Cardinal Alfonso Gesualdo di Conza.On 30 June 1622, he was appointed during the papacy of Pope Gregory XV as Titular Bishop of Margarita. It is uncertain when he died.

== External links and additional sources ==
- Cheney, David M. "Mactaris (Titular See)". Catholic-Hierarchy.org. (for Chronology of Bishops) ^{[self-published]}
- Chow, Gabriel. "Titular Episcopal See of Mactaris (Tunisia)". GCatholic.org. (for Chronology of Bishops) ^{[self-published]}

Catholic Church titles
Preceded by Balthasar Miaskowski	Titular Bishop of Margarita; 1622–?	Succeeded by Krzysztof Charbicki
