= Andreas Albinowski =

Roman Catholic prelate

Most Reverend Andreas Albinowski
- Auxiliary Bishop of Włocławek; Titular Bishop of Ordaea
- Church: Catholic Church
- Diocese: Diocese of Włocławek
- In office: 1695–?

Orders
- Ordination: 13 April 1670

Personal details
- Born: 10 December 1640 Moscicen
- Died: 30 May 1695 (age 54) Włocławek, Poland

Andreas Albinowski (10 December 1640 – 30 May 1695) was a Roman Catholic prelate who served as Auxiliary Bishop of Włocławek (1695–?)

== Biography ==
Andreas Albinowski was born in Moscicen on 10 December 1640. He was ordained a deacon on 8 April 1670 and a priest on 13 April 1670. On 30 May 1695, he was appointed during the papacy of Pope Innocent XII as Auxiliary Bishop of Włocławek and Titular Bishop of Ordaea. It is uncertain how long he served; the next auxiliary bishop of record was Wojciech Ignacy Bardziński who was appointed in 1709.
