= Aleksander Myszczyński =

16th-century Roman Catholic bishop

Most Reverend Aleksander Myszczyński
- Auxiliary Bishop of Włocławek; Titular Bishop of Margarita
- Church: Catholic Church
- Diocese: Diocese of Włocławek
- In office: 1514–?

Aleksander Myszczyński was a Roman Catholic prelate who served as Auxiliary Bishop of Włocławek (1514–?).

== Biography ==
Myszczyński was from the village of Myszczyn. On 20 Feb 1514, Myszczyński was appointed during the papacy of Pope Leo X as Auxiliary Bishop of Włocławek and Titular Bishop of Margarita. It is uncertain how long he served. While bishop, he was the principal co-consecrator of Rafał Leszczyński (bishop), Bishop of Przemyśl (1524); Jan Karnkowski (bishop), Bishop of Przemyśl (1528); Dominik Małachowski, Auxiliary Bishop of Kraków and Titular Bishop of Laodicea in Phrygia (1528); and Mikolaj Brolinski, Auxiliary Bishop of Płock and Titular Bishop of Lacedaemonia (1533).

Myszczyński died in 1540.
