= Baltazar Miaskowski =

Roman Catholic bishop (1570–1632)

Most Reverend Baltazar Miaskowski
- Titular Bishop of Margarita; Auxiliary Bishop of Włocławek
- Church: Catholic Church
- Diocese: Diocese of Włocławek
- In office: 1617–1632

Orders
- Consecration: 18 Mar 1618 by Paweł Wołucki

Personal details
- Born: 1570 Smogoseno, Poland
- Died: 1632 (age 62)

Baltazar Miaskowski (1570–1632) was a Catholic prelate who served as Auxiliary Bishop of Włocławek (1617–1632) and Titular Bishop of Margarita (1617–1632).

== Biography ==
Baltazar Miaskowski was born in 1570 in Smogoseno, Poland. On 22 May 1617, he was appointed during the papacy of Pope Paul V as Auxiliary Bishop of Włocławek and Titular Bishop of Margarita. On 18 Mar 1618, he was consecrated bishop by Paweł Wołucki, Bishop of Włocławek, with Stanisław Sieciński, Bishop of Przemyśl, and Adam Nowodworski, Bishop of Kamyanets-Podilskyi, serving as co-consecrators. He served as Auxiliary Bishop of Włocławek until his death in 1632.

While bishop, he was the principal co-consecrator of Franciszek Zajerski, Auxiliary Bishop of Lutsk and Titular Bishop of Argos (1622).

== External links and additional sources ==
- Cheney, David M. "Diocese of Włocławek (Kujawy, Kalisze)". Catholic-Hierarchy.org. (for Chronology of Bishops) ^{[self-published]}
- Chow, Gabriel. "Diocese of Włocławek (Poland)". GCatholic.org. (for Chronology of Bishops) ^{[self-published]}
- Cheney, David M. "Mactaris (Titular See)". Catholic-Hierarchy.org. (for Chronology of Bishops) ^{[self-published]}
- Chow, Gabriel. "Titular Episcopal See of Mactaris (Tunisia)". GCatholic.org. (for Chronology of Bishops) ^{[self-published]}

Catholic Church titles
Preceded by	Auxiliary Bishop of Włocławek; 1617–1632	Succeeded by
Preceded by Franciszek Lacki	Titular Bishop of Margarita; 1617–1632	Succeeded by Curtio Palumbo
