= Krzysztof Charbicki =

Roman Catholic bishop (1585–1638)

Most Reverend Krzysztof Charbicki
- Titular Bishop of Margarita; Auxiliary Bishop of Włocławek
- Church: Catholic Church
- Diocese: Diocese of Włocławek
- In office: 1634–1638

Orders
- Consecration: 12 Aug 1635 by Maciej Łubieński

Personal details
- Born: 1585
- Died: 22 June 1638 (aged 52–53)

Wenceslaus Paprocki (1585–1638) was a Roman Catholic prelate who served as Auxiliary Bishop of Włocławek (1634–1638) and Titular Bishop of Margarita (1634–1638).

== Biography ==
Krzysztof Charbicki was born in 1585. On 17 Dec 1634, he was appointed during the papacy of Pope Urban VIII as Auxiliary Bishop of Włocławek and Titular Bishop of Margarita. On 12 Aug 1635, he was consecrated bishop by Maciej Łubieński, Bishop of Włocławek, with Stanisław Łubieński, Bishop of Płock, and Stanislaw Starczewski, Titular Bishop of Lacedaemonia. He served as Bishop of Włocławek until his death on 22 Jun 1638.

== External links and additional sources ==
- Cheney, David M. "Diocese of Włocławek (Kujawy, Kalisze)". Catholic-Hierarchy.org. (for Chronology of Bishops) ^{[self-published]}
- Chow, Gabriel. "Diocese of Włocławek (Poland)". GCatholic.org. (for Chronology of Bishops) ^{[self-published]}
- Cheney, David M. "Mactaris (Titular See)". Catholic-Hierarchy.org. (for Chronology of Bishops) ^{[self-published]}
- Chow, Gabriel. "Titular Episcopal See of Mactaris (Tunisia)". GCatholic.org. (for Chronology of Bishops) ^{[self-published]}

Catholic Church titles
Preceded by	Auxiliary Bishop of Włocławek; 1634–1638	Succeeded by
Preceded by Curtio Palumbo	Titular Bishop of Margarita; 1634–1638	Succeeded by Piotr Mieszkowski
