= Onold =

Onold (died between 1180 and 1187) was the third bishop of Kujawy. According to tradition (unconfirmed by documents), it was precisely in his time that the seat of the diocese of Kujawy moved from Kruszwica to Włocławek.

It is not known when Onold took over the rule in the Włocławek diocese. He is documented for the first time as a bishopric on 21 May 1161. While his predecessor Warner is known only from the Papal Bull of Eugene III from April 1148. It is also unknown how long Onold held his office. He certainly lived in 1180, when he took part in the synagogue in Łęczyca, where the first immunities for the clergy were passed. His successor Stefan has been documented since 1187.
