= Stanisław Domaniewski =

Roman Catholic prelate (??–1677)

Most Reverend Stanisław Domaniewski
- Auxiliary Bishop of Włocławek; Titular Bishop of Margarita
- Church: Catholic Church
- Diocese: Diocese of Włocławek
- In office: 1653–1677

Orders
- Consecration: 15 Feb 1654 by Pietro Vidoni

Personal details
- Died: 1677 Włocławek, Poland

Stanisław Domaniewski (died 1677) was a Roman Catholic prelate who served as Auxiliary Bishop of Włocławek (1653–1677) and Titular Bishop of Margarita (1653–1677).

== Biography ==
On 9 Jun 1653, Stanisław Domaniewski was appointed during the papacy of Pope Innocent X as Auxiliary Bishop of Włocławek and Titular Bishop of Margarita. On 15 Feb 1654, he was consecrated bishop by Pietro Vidoni, Bishop of Lodi, with Stanisław Jacek Święcicki, Auxiliary Bishop of Žemaičiai and Titular Bishop of Spiga, and Jan Rakowski, Auxiliary Bishop of Chelmno and Titular Bishop of Orthosias in Caria, serving as co-consecrators. He served as Auxiliary Bishop of Włocławek until his death in 1677.

While bishop, he was the principal co-consecrator of Adam Kos, Bishop of Chelmno (1658); Maciej Bystrom, Auxiliary Bishop of Chelmno and Titular Bishop of Argos (1661); and Gaspar Trizenieski, Auxiliary Bishop of Gniezno (1661)

== External links and additional sources ==
- Cheney, David M. "Diocese of Włocławek (Kujawy, Kalisze". Catholic-Hierarchy.org. (for Chronology of Bishops) ^{[self-published]}
- Chow, Gabriel. "Diocese of Włocławek (poland)". GCatholic.org. (for Chronology of Bishops) ^{[self-published]}
- Cheney, David M. "Mactaris (Titular See)". Catholic-Hierarchy.org. (for Chronology of Bishops) ^{[self-published]}
- Chow, Gabriel. "Titular Episcopal See of Mactaris (Tunisia)". GCatholic.org. (for Chronology of Bishops) ^{[self-published]}

Catholic Church titles
| Preceded by | Auxiliary Bishop of Włocławek; 1653–1677 | Succeeded by |
| Preceded by Valerius Wilezogerzosi | Titular Bishop of Margarita; 1653–1677 | Succeeded by Francisco Cisneros y Mendoza |
