= Walerian Wilczogórski =

Polish Roman Catholic prelate

Most Reverend Walerian Wilczogórski
- Auxiliary Bishop of Włocławek; Titular Bishop of Margarita
- Church: Catholic Church
- Diocese: Diocese of Włocławek
- In office: 1652–?

Orders
- Consecration: 1652 by Nicolas Albert Gniewosz de Olexow

Walerian Wilczogórski was a Roman Catholic prelate who served as Auxiliary Bishop of Włocławek (1652–?).

== Biography ==
On 13 May 1652, Walerian Wilczogórski was appointed during the papacy of Pope Innocent X as Auxiliary Bishop of Włocławek and Titular Bishop of Margarita. In 1652, he was consecrated bishop by Nicolas Albert Gniewosz de Olexow, Bishop of Włocławek. It is uncertain how long he served; the next auxiliary bishop of record was Stanisław Domaniewski who was appointed in 1653.

== External links and additional sources ==
- Cheney, David M. "Diocese of Włocławek (Kujawy, Kalisze". Catholic-Hierarchy.org. (for Chronology of Bishops) ^{[self-published]}
- Chow, Gabriel. "Diocese of Włocławek (Poland)". GCatholic.org. (for Chronology of Bishops) ^{[self-published]}
- Cheney, David M. "Mactaris (Titular See)". Catholic-Hierarchy.org. (for Chronology of Bishops) ^{[self-published]}
- Chow, Gabriel. "Titular Episcopal See of Mactaris (Tunisia)". GCatholic.org. (for Chronology of Bishops) ^{[self-published]}

Catholic Church titles
Preceded by	Auxiliary Bishop of Włocławek; 1652–?	Succeeded by
Preceded by Piotr Mieszkowski (starszy)	Titular Bishop of Margarita; 1652–?	Succeeded by Stanisław Domaniewski
