= Parish of the Holiest Saviour, Włocławek =

Church in Wloclawek, Poland

Coordinates: 52°13′08″N 21°01′04″E

Church of the Holiest Saviour
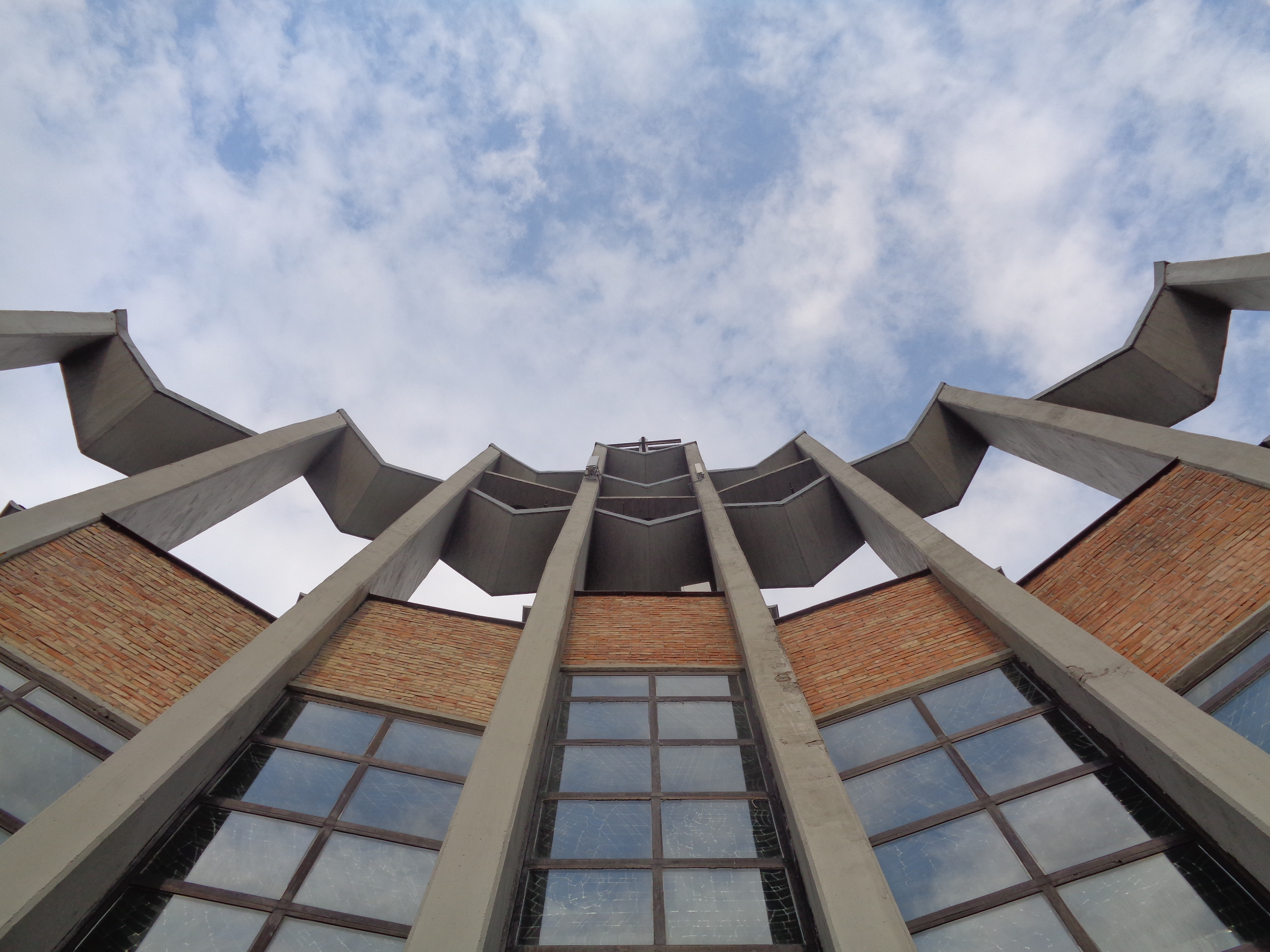
- Country: Poland
- Region: Wloclawek
- Affiliation: Catholic
- Address: Reymonta 11/13

Parish of the Holiest Saviour, (polish Parafia Najświętszego Zbawiciela we Włocławku), is a Latin Church parish in Włocławek located next to Park Łokietka. Part of Roman Catholic Diocese of Włocławek and subunit of deanery Wloclawek I.

- church: Kościół Najświętszego Zbawiciela we Włocławku

== Communities ==
- OAZA
- Schola
- Ministrant altar boys
- TRIO SALUS" band

== History ==
Established on April 20, 1958, by intention priest bishop Antoni Pawłowski.

== See also ==
- World Youth Day 2016
- Church of the Holiest Saviour
