= Henryk Muszyński =

Polish bishop

His Excellency Henryk Muszyński
- Archbishop Emeritus of Gniezno, Primate Emeritus of Poland
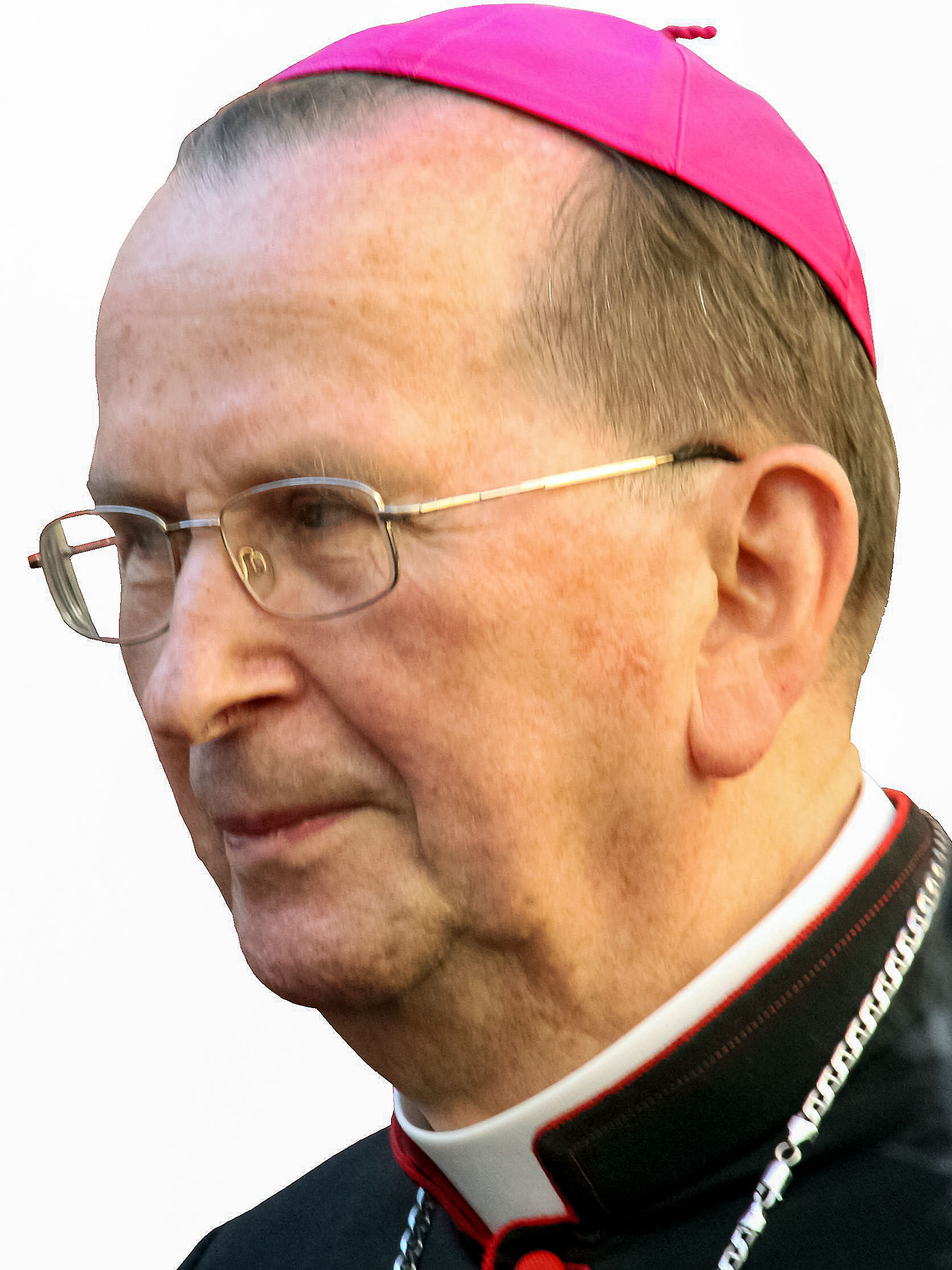
- Church: Roman Catholic
- Archdiocese: Gniezno
- Diocese: Gniezno
- Predecessor: Józef Glemp
- Successor: Józef Kowalczyk

Personal details
- Born: 20 March 1933 (age 93) Kościerzyna, Second Polish Republic
- Motto: In Verbo Tuo (At Thy word)
- Coat of arms

Henryk Józef Muszyński (born 20 March 1933) is a Polish Roman Catholic prelate, who served as the Primate of Poland and as a former archbishop of Gniezno, having been appointed by Pope John Paul II when the Polish hierarchy was reorganized in March 1992. He had previously been Bishop of Diocese of Włocławek since 1987.

== Life ==
He is known for his Biblical studies, especially concerning the Qumran manuscripts.

He has been described as "an advocate of open and tolerant Catholicism".

Together with Danuta Hubner and Tadeusz Pieronek, Muszyński coauthored a reflection on the integration of Polish Christianity into the European Union. This reflection persuaded many Polish rectors to become proponents of Poland's accession to the European Union in 2004.

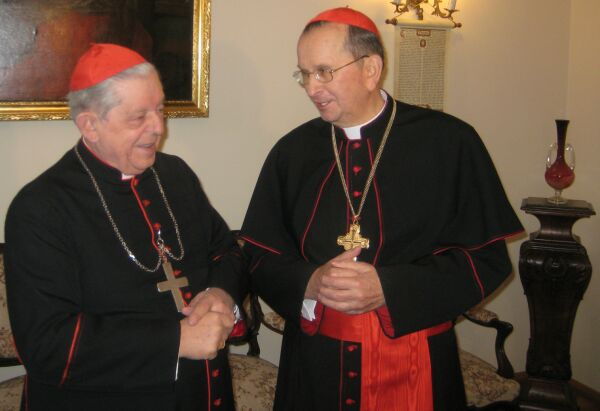
Primate Henryk Muszyński (right) and Józef Glemp (left)

Historically, the Archbishop of Gniezno served simultaneously as the Primate of Poland. But when the reorganization of the Polish Church's ecclesiastical structure severed the See from Warsaw, an exception was made to continue the long-standing tradition until the retirement of the Archbishop of Warsaw, who had previously been Archbishop of both cities. On 1 November 2006 Pope Benedict XVI sent a letter to Józef Glemp confirming that Cardinal Glemp would be the Primate of Poland until 18 December 2009, his 80th birthday.

According to controversial records saved in Instytut Pamięci Narodowej, since 1985 to 1989 Henryk Muszyński was registered as secret collaborator of communist Służba Bezpieczeństwa, however he did not agree to this and not even know about that fact, and that his superiors were informed about all talks with communist authorities. Muszyński expressed regret that he could not refuse such talks.

Archbishop Muszynski has sought to constantly improve relations with Jews and Germans. In 1999, he received the Buber-Rosenzweig-Medal for his contributions to Christian–Jewish understanding. He was praised by Pope Benedict XVI for doing this in 2005.

== See also ==
Catholic Church titles
Preceded by Jan Zaręba	Bishop of Włocławek; 1987–1992	Succeeded by Bronisław Dembowski
Preceded by Józef Glemp	Archbishop of Gniezno; 1992–2010	Succeeded by Józef Kowalczyk
Preceded by Józef Glemp	Primate of Poland; 2009–2010	Succeeded by Józef Kowalczyk
