= Piotr Mieszkowski =

Polish bishop suffragan

Most Reverend Piotr Mieszkowski
- Auxiliary Bishop of Włocławek; Titular Bishop of Margarita
- Church: Catholic Church
- Diocese: Diocese of Włocławek
- In office: 1643–1652

Orders
- Consecration: 15 Nov 1643 by Andrzej Szołdrski

Personal details
- Died: 1652

Piotr Mieszkowski, Senior (Polish: Piotr Mieszkowski, starszy) (died 1652) was a bishop suffragan (episcopus suffraganeus) of Włocławek. Author of several political books and brochures, among them Institutio peregrinationum, peregrinantibus peroportuna..., (Lovanium, 1625).

In 1644 he consecrated the church Katedra p.w. Najświętszej Panny Marii in Włocławek.

== See also ==
- Piotr Mieszkowski (iuniore), bishop suffragan in late 17th century

== External links and additional sources ==
- Cheney, David M. "Diocese of Włocławek (Kujawy, Kalisze)". Catholic-Hierarchy.org. (for Chronology of Bishops) ^{[self-published]}
- Chow, Gabriel. "Diocese of Włocławek (Poland)". GCatholic.org. (for Chronology of Bishops) ^{[self-published]}
- Cheney, David M. "Mactaris (Titular See)". Catholic-Hierarchy.org. (for Chronology of Bishops) ^{[self-published]}
- Chow, Gabriel. "Titular Episcopal See of Mactaris (Tunisia)". GCatholic.org. (for Chronology of Bishops) ^{[self-published]}

Catholic Church titles
Preceded by	Auxiliary Bishop of Włocławek; 1643–1652	Succeeded by
Preceded by Wenceslaus Paprocki	Titular Bishop of Margarita; 1643–1652	Succeeded by Valerius Wilezogerzosi
