= Albierz =

Albierz (Alberus; died 1283) was a bishop of Włocławek (Kuyavian-Pomeranian). There is not much information about him. He came from a non-fraternal, probably bourgeois family. The first mentions about him, talk about Albierz as a chaplain of Michał, Bishop of Włocławek. Around 1250, he became archdeacon. From 1258, he was dean of Włocławek. He became the Bishop of Włocławek in 1275.

The then bishopric of Włocławek also included the area of Gdańsk Pomerania. Hence Albierz took part in the settlement of border disputes between the Pomeranian prince Mściwoj II (Mestwin II) and the Teutonic Knights. At the same time, he assured the Włocławek bishopric of a number of new princely broadcasts in the archdiocese of the Pomeranian bishopric.

The Kujawsko-Pomorskie diocese also had fortunes in the Chełmno land of the Order. Albierz managed to conclude an agreement with the Teutonic Knights on the use of the bishopric of these properties.

Albierz died in December 1283.
