= Franciszek Lacki =

Roman Catholic bishop (1562–1617)

Most Reverend Franciszek Lacki
- Church: Catholic Church
- Diocese: Diocese of Włocławek
- In office: 1597–1617

Orders
- Consecration: 24 August 1598 by Stanisław Rozrażewski

Personal details
- Born: 1562
- Died: 19 January 1617 (age 55) Włocławek, Poland

Franciszek Lacki or Franciszek Lanczki (1562–1617) was a Roman Catholic prelate who served as Auxiliary Bishop of Włocławek (1597–1617) and Titular Bishop of Margarita (1597–1617).

== Biography ==
Franciszek Lacki was born in 1562. On 15 September 1597, he was appointed during the papacy of Pope Clement VIII as Auxiliary Bishop of Włocławek and Titular Bishop of Margarita. On 24 August 1598, he was consecrated bishop by Stanisław Rozrażewski, Bishop of Włocławek, with Jan Gniasdowski, Titular Bishop of Teodosia, and Jan Zamoyski (bishop), Titular Bishop of Philippi, serving as co-consecrators. He served as Auxiliary Bishop of Włocławek until his death on 19 January 1617.

While bishop, he was the principal co-consecrator of: Jerzy Zamoyski, Bishop of Chełm (1601); Jan Kuczborski, Bishop of Chelmno (1614); and Stanislaw Starczewski, Titular Bishop of Lacedaemonia and Auxiliary Bishop of Płock (1615).

== External links and additional sources ==
- Cheney, David M. "Diocese of Włocławek (Kujawy, Kalisze)". Catholic-Hierarchy.org. (for Chronology of Bishops) ^{[self-published]}
- Chow, Gabriel. "Diocese of Włocławek (Poland)". GCatholic.org. (for Chronology of Bishops) ^{[self-published]}
- Cheney, David M. "Mactaris (Titular See)". Catholic-Hierarchy.org. (for Chronology of Bishops) ^{[self-published]}
- Chow, Gabriel. "Titular Episcopal See of Mactaris (Tunisia)". GCatholic.org. (for Chronology of Bishops) ^{[self-published]}

Catholic Church titles
Preceded by	Auxiliary Bishop of Włocławek; 1597–1617	Succeeded by
Preceded by Joannes Nowomiciski	Titular Bishop of Margarita; 1597–1617	Succeeded by Baltazar Miaskowski
