= Diocese of Kruszwica =

Legendary Catholic diocese in Poland (966-1156)

Bishops of Kujawy (later known as bishops of Włocławek) are the bishops of the Roman Catholic Diocese of Kujawy (1133–1818), Roman Catholic Diocese of Kujawy–Kalisz (1818–1925) and Roman Catholic Diocese of Włocławek (from 1925).

== Bishops of Kujawy (Kruszwica) (966–1156) ==
The following are the legendary bishops of Kruszwica mentioned by Jan Długosz. They are not believed to be historical persons:

- 966–993 – Lucidus
- 993–1014 – Wawrzyniec
- 1015–1033 – Marcellinus Marceli
- 1034–1055 – Wenanty
- 1056–1081 – Jan Rzymianin
- 1082–1097 – Romanus/Roman
- 1097–1111 – Paweł
- 1111–1128 – Baldwin Gall
- 1129–1156 – Świdger/Swidger

== Suffragan ==
(auxiliary?) Bishops of Kujawy–Kalisze

- 1838–1844 – Józef Joachim Goldtmann
- 1918–1927 – Władysław Paweł Krynicki
- 1918–1938 – Wojciech Stanisław Owczarek
- 1939–1943 – blessed Michał Kozal
- 1946–1962 – Franciszek Korszyński
- 1962–1979 – Kazimierz Majdański
- 1963–1969 – Jan Zaręba
- 1973–1997 – Czesław Lewandowski
- 1981–2003 – Roman Andrzejewski
- 1999–present – Stanisław Gębicki

== Sources ==
Jan Fijałek: Ustalenie chronologii biskupów włocławskich, Kraków 1894
