= Stefan (bishop of Włocławek) =

Stefan (died between 1198 and 1207) was chancellor of Prince Kazimierz the Just, and Bishop of Włocławek.

== Biography ==
Initially, he was to be the provost of the cathedral chapter of Włocławek. During the reunion in Jędrzejów, with the participation of princes and nobles, he appeared as the chancellor of the prince Kazimierz the Just. This congress dates back to the end of 1167 or the beginning of 1168.

In Jędrzejów, he performed as a chancellor in Wiślica, after Kazimierz became a chancellor of the district in 1173, and from 1177 he was the chancellor of the same prince. It is not known how long he operated on this office, in 1189 sources mention his successor in the person of Chancellor Mrokoty. Prior to this event, Stefan took over the new office.

As Bishop of Włocławek, he is certified for the first time in the document of Kazimierz the Righteous from 1187.

He probably became a bishop in support of the same prince after the death of Bishop Onold (died after 1180). In 1187, he took part in the settlement of the dispute over the chapel in Płock, in 1191 he participated in the dedication of the collegiate church in Sandomierz. He supported the Norbertine monastery in Strzelno with tithing, he gave the nuns a mill in Kwieciszewo in exchange for the village of Otłoczyn.

The Oliwa Cistercians gave the right to free burial. Before 1198, he consecrated the church of Saint. Of the Trinity in Lubiszewo and tithed from two villages. In 1198, he consecrated the church in Świecie and had some participation in donations for the benefit of the Knights of St John in Starogaradzie Gdanski.

Jan Długosz and the cathedral tradition give the erroneous date of the bishop's death on 1197 and the Włocławek cathedral as the place of burial. He died for sure after 11 November 1198 (the date of the consecration in Świecie), and before 1206/07, when his successor Ogierz was documented.
