= Diocese of Włocławek =

Latin Catholic territory in Poland

Coordinates: 52.6608°N 19.0678°E

Diocese of Włocławek Dioecesis Vladislaviensis Diecezja Włocławska

Catholic
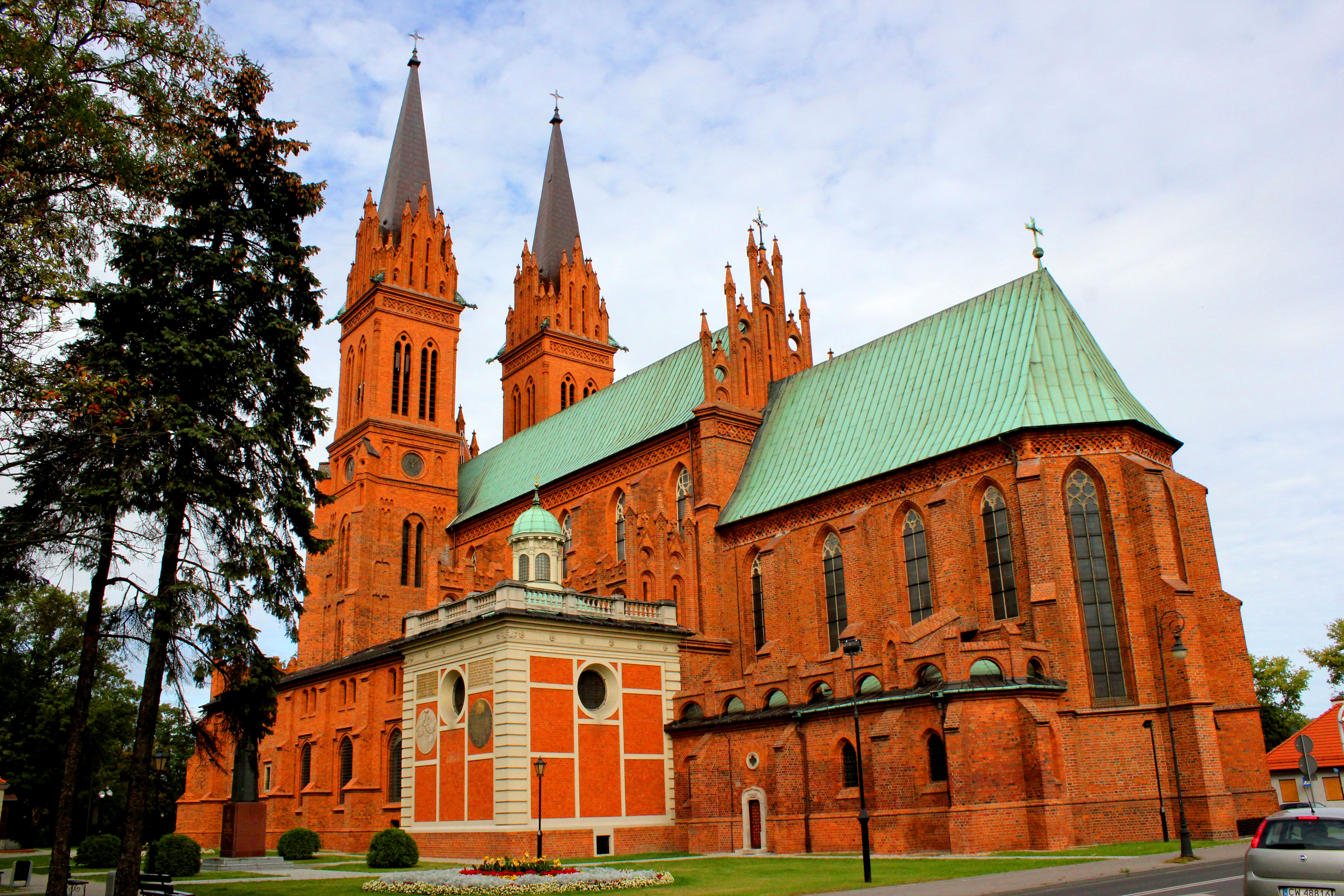
- Włocławek Cathedral; Basilica Cathedral of the Assumption of the Blessed Virgin Mary in Włocławek

Location
- Country: Poland
- Ecclesiastical province: Gniezno

Statistics
- Area: 8,824 km^{2} (3,407 sq mi)
- Population: Total; Catholics: (as of 2022); 758,348; 748,506 (98.7%)

Information
- Denomination: Catholic Church
- Sui iuris church: Latin Church
- Rite: Roman Rite
- Cathedral: Włocławek Cathedral; Katedra Wniebowzięcia Najświętszej; Marii Panny (Cathedral of the Assumption of the Blessed Virgin Mary)

Current leadership
- Pope: Leo XIV
- Bishop: Krzysztof Jakub Wętkowski
- Metropolitan Archbishop: Wojciech Polak
- Bishops emeritus: Stanisław Gębicki; Wiesław Mering

Map
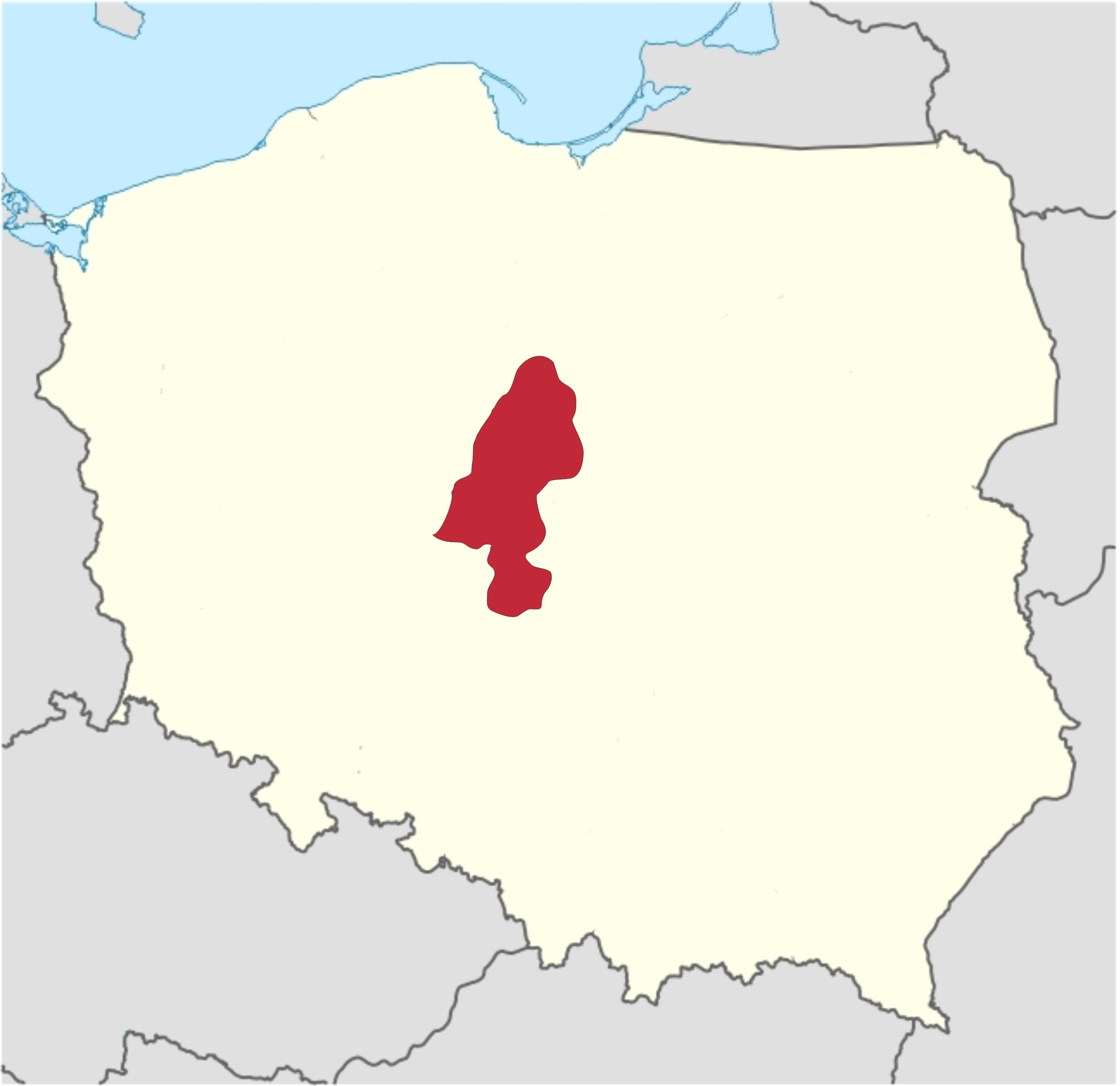

Website
- Website of the Diocese

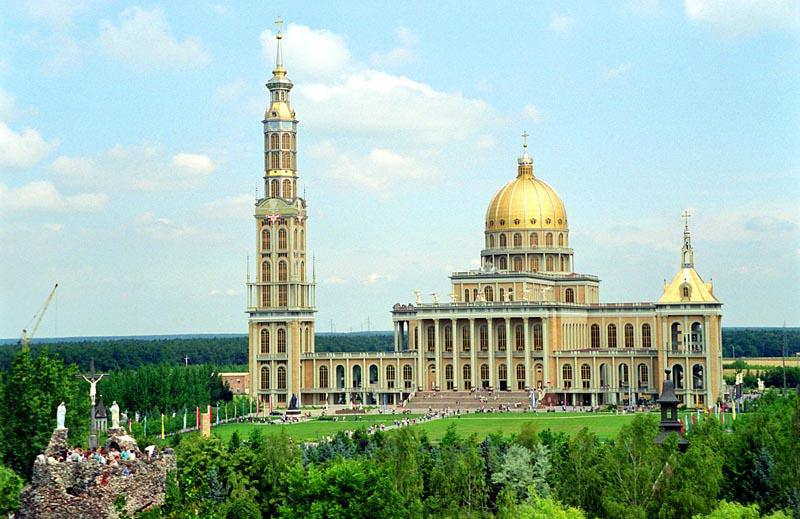
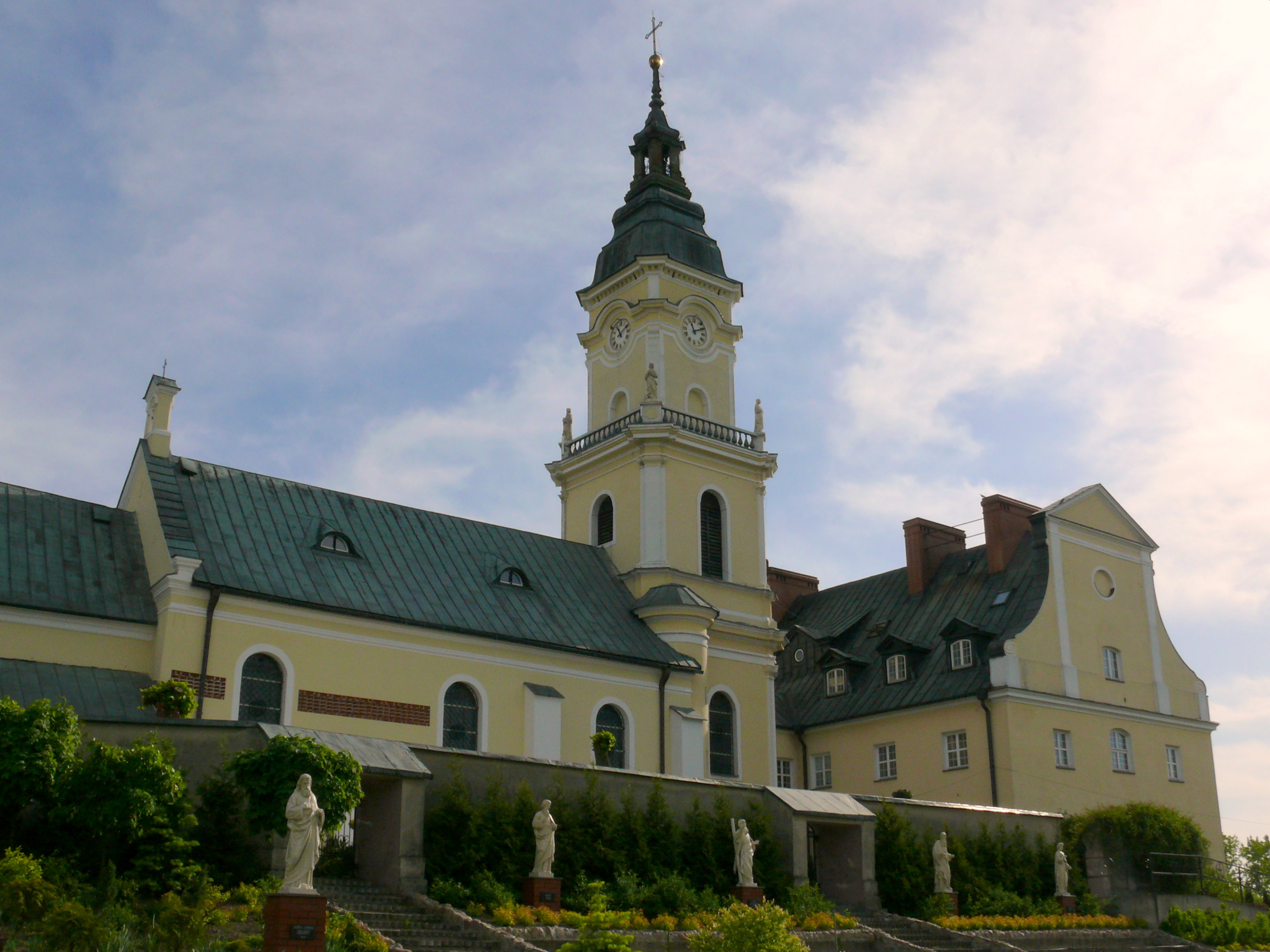
Basilica of Our Lady of Licheń (left) Sanctuary of the Mother of God Victorious in Brdów (right)

The Diocese of Włocławek (Latin: Dioecesis Vladislaviensis) is a Latin Church ecclesiastical territory or diocese of the Catholic Church in Poland. It is a suffragan in the ecclesiastical province of the Metropolitan Archdiocese of Gniezno. Until the 20th century, it was known as the Diocese of Kujawy.

The bishops' seat is Włocławek Cathedral, also a minor basilica: Bazylika Katedralna Wniebowzięcia NMP in the city of Włocławek, in Kujawsko-Pomorskie.
The diocese has two more Minor Basilicas:

- Basilica of Our Lady of Licheń (Polish: Bazylika MB Bolesnej Królowej Polski), in Licheń Stary, Wielkopolskie
- Bazylika Wniebowzięcia NMP, in Zduńska Wola, Łódzkie.

The diocese is currently headed by Bishop Krzysztof Jakub Wętkowski, appointed in 2021.

== History ==
- We disregard the presumably merely-legendary precursor(?) Diocese of Kruszwica (966–1156)
- Established in 1015 as Diocese of Kujawy–Pomorze (i.e. Kujawy–Pomerania) / Kruszwicka (Polish) / Cuiavia–Pomerania (Curiate Italian), on territory split off from the suppressed Diocese of Kolberg (Kołobrzeg)
- Renamed in 1148 as Diocese of Kujawy–Pomorze / Cuiavia–Pomerania (Italiano) / since ca. 1124/1126 called Włocławek after its see
- Theological seminary in Włocławek founded in 1569 by Bishop Stanisław Karnkowski as one of the oldest seminaries in Poland.
- Gained territory in 1633 from the Diocese of Płock
- Renamed on 30 June 1818 as Diocese of Kujawy–Kaliska / Cuiavia–Kalisz (Italiano), having lost territories to its Metropolitan the Archdiocese of Gniezno, to Diocese of Poznań, to Diocese of Wrocław and to Diocese of Płock.
- Renamed on 28 Oct 1925 after its see as Diocese of Włocławek / Wladislavia / Vladislavien(sis) (Latin adjective)
- During the German occupation of Poland (World War II), the Germans murdered 249 priests from the Diocese of Włocławek, including the Auxiliary Bishop of Włocławek Michał Kozal, closed down the cathedral, and robbed the precious historical collections of the diocese of Włocławek.
- Lost territory on 25 March 1992 to establish the Diocese of Kalisz.
- It enjoyed Papal visits from the Polish Pope John Paul II in June 1991 and June 1999.
- In 2018, the Włocławek Cathedral was listed by the President of Poland as a Historic Monument of Poland.

== Statistics ==
As of 2022, it pastorally served 748,506 Catholics (98.7% of 758,348 total) on 8,824 km² in 233 parishes and 126 missions with 566 priests (460 diocesan, 106 religious), 463 lay religious (148 brothers, 315 sisters) and 24 seminarians.

== Episcopal ordinaries ==
Imported from List of bishops of Kujawy (Włocławek) and amended; sources contradict often, notably in the first centuries:

Suffragan Bishops of Kujawy–Pomorze

(Kujawy–Pomerania, Włocławek; 1133–1818)

- Swidger (1128? – 1151;? attested from 1133)
- Onold (1151? – 1160?; attested 1161–1180)
- Rudger (1160? – 1170?)
- Werner (1170? – 1178? or 1148–1156?)
- Wunelf (1178?–1190?)
- Stefan (attested 1187–1198–)
- Ogerius (1197/1203; attested 1206?–1212)
- Bartha (1203–1215; attested 1213–1220)
- Michał (1215 – 1256 or 1222–1252)
- Wolimir (1256–1271 or 1252–1275)
- Albierz/Wojciech (1271?/1275? – 1283)
- 1284–1300 – Wiesław
- 1300–1323 – Gerward
- 1324–1364 – Maciej z Gołańczy
- 1364–1383 – Zbylut z Wąsosza
- 1383–1383 – Trojan
- 1384–1389 – Jan Kropidło
- 1389–1398 – Henry VIII of Legnica (Henryk VIII legnicki)
- 1399–1402 – Mikołaj Kurowski
- 1402–1421 – Jan Kropidło (again)
- 1421–1427 – Jan Pella
- 1427–1433 – Jan Szafraniec
- 1433–1449 – Władysław Oporowski
- 1449–1450 – Mikołaj Lasocki
- 1450–1463 – Jan Gruszczyński
- 1463–1464 – Jan Lutek
- 1464–1472 – Jakub z Sienna
- 1473–1480 – Zbigniew Oleśnicki
- 1481–1483 – Andrzej Oporowski
- 1484–1493 – Piotr Moszyński
- 1494–1503 – Krzesław Kurozwęcki
- 1503–1513 – Wincenty Przerębski
- 1513–1531 – Maciej Drzewicki
- 1531–1538 – Jan Karnkowski
- 1538–1542 – Łukasz II Górka
- 1542–1546 – Mikołaj Dzierzgowski
- 1546–1551 – Andrzej Zebrzydowski
- 1551–1557 – Jan Drohojowskii
- 1557–1565 – Jakub Uchański
- 1565–1567 – Mikołaj Wolski
- 1567–1580 – Stanisław Karnkowski
- 1581–1600 – Hieronim Rozrażewski
- 1600–1603 – Jan Tarnowski
- 1603–1607 – Piotr Tylicki
- 1608–1608 – Wojciech Baranowski
- 1608–1610 – Maciej Pstrokoński
- 1610–1616 – Wawrzyniec Gembicki
- 1616–1622 – Paweł Wołucki
- 1622–1631 – Andrzej Lipski
- 1631–1642 – Maciej Łubieński
- 1642–1654 – Mikołaj Wojciech Gniewosz
- 1654–1673 – Kazimierz Florian Czartoryski
- 1674–1675 – Jan Gembicki
- 1675–1680 – Stanisław Sarnowski
- 1680–1691 – Bonawentura Madaliński
- 1691–1700 – Stanisław Dąmbski
- 1700–1705 – Stanisław Szembek
- 1705–1720 – Felicjan Konstanty Szaniawski
- 1720–1735 – Krzysztof Antoni Szembek
- 1735–1741 – Adam Stanisław Grabowski
- 1741–1751 – Walenty Aleksander Czapski
- 1751–1763 – Antoni Sebastian Dembowski
- 1763–1776 – Antoni Kazimierz Ostrowski
- 1777–1806 – Józef Ignacy Rybiński
- 1806–1815 – vacant
- 1815–1818 – Franciszek Malczewski

Suffragan Bishops of Kujawy–Kaliska

- 1818–1822 – Andrzej Wołłowicz
- 1822–1831 – Józef Szczepan Koźmian
- 1831–1836 – vacant
- 1836–1850 – Walenty Maciej Bończa
- 1850–1856 – vacant
- 1856–1867 – Jan Michał Marszewski
- 1867–1876 – vacancy
- 1876–1883 – Wincenty Teofil Popiel
- 1883–1902 – Aleksander Kazimierz Bereśniewicz
- Stanisław Kazimierz Zdzitowiecki (1902–1925 see below)

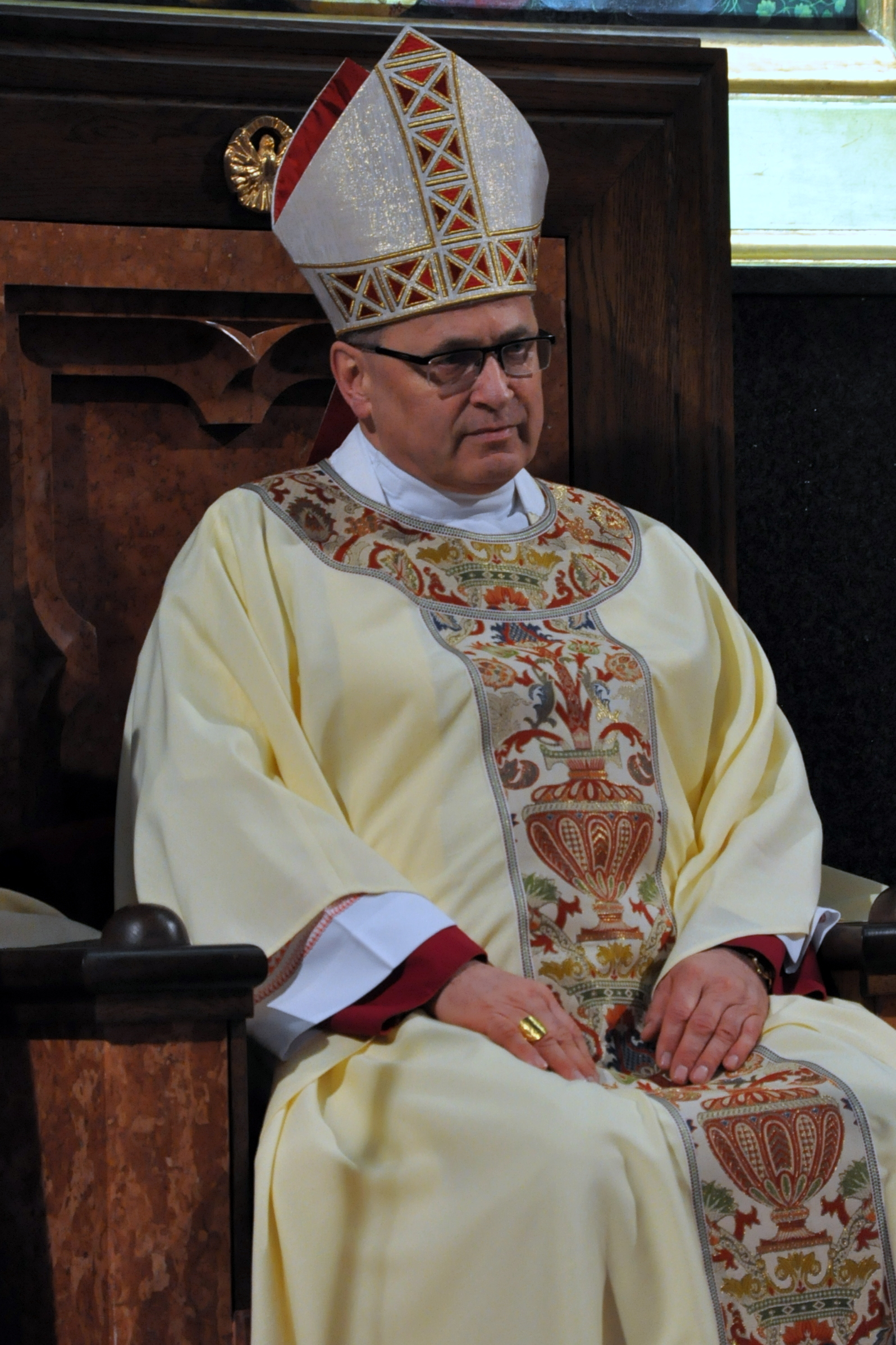
Bishop Wiesław Mering

Suffragan Bishops of Włocławek

- Stanisław Kazimierz Zdzitowiecki (see above 1925–1927 –)
- 1927–1928 – Władysław Paweł Krynicki
- 1928–1951 – Karol Mieczysław Radoński
- 1951–1968 – Antoni Pawłowski
- 1969–1986 – Jan Zaręba
- 1987–1992 – Henryk Muszyński
- 1992–2003 – Bronisław Dembowski
- 2003–2021 – Wiesław Mering
- 2021–... – Krzysztof Jakub Wętkowski

=== Auxiliary bishops ===
  - 1514–? – Aleksander Myszczynski
  - 1581–1585 – Maciej Wielicki
  - 1597–1617 – Franciszek Lanczki
  - 1617–1632 – Balthasar Miaskowski
  - 1634–1638 – Krzysztof Charbicki
  - 1639–1643 – Wenceslaus Paprocki
  - 1643–1652 – Piotr Mieszkowski (starszy)
  - 1652–? – Walerian Wilczogórski
  - 1653–1677 – Stanisław Domaniewski
  - 1678–1696 – Piotr Mieszkowski (młodszy)
  - 1695–? – Andreas Albinowski
  - 1709–1723 – Wojciech Ignacy Bardziński
  - 1725–1736 – Franciszek Antoni Kobielski
  - 1737–1739 – Aleksander Działyński
  - 1740–1759 – Franciszek Kanigowski
  - 1759–1788 – Jan Dembowski
  - 1766–1775 – Cyprian Kazimierz von Wolicki
  - 1775–1781 – Maciej Grzegorz Garnysz
- 1781–1799 – Ludwik Stanisław Górski
  - 1789–1793 – Marcin Chyczewski
- 1794–1819 – Feliks Łukasz Lewiński
  - 1819–1825 – Józef Marcelin Dzięcielski
  - 1838–1844 – Józef Joachim Goldtmann
  - 1844–1861 – Taddeo Łubieński
- 1884–1898 – Carlo Pollner
  - 1884–1889 – Henryk Piotr Kossowski
  - 1918–1938 – Wojciech Stanisław Owczarek
  - 1918–1927 – Władysław Paweł Krynicki, Appointed Bishop of Włocławek
  - 1939–1943 – Bl. Michaël Kozal
- 1962–1979 – Kazimierz Jan Majdański
  - 1946–1972 – Franciszek Salezy Korszyński
- 1963–1969 – Jan Zareba, Appointed Bishop of Włocławek
  - 1973–1997 – Czeslaw Lewandowski
  - 1981–2003 – Roman Andrzejewski
  - 1999–2020 – Stanisław Gębicki

== See also ==
- List of Catholic dioceses in Poland
- Parish of the Holiest Saviour, Włocławek

== Sources and external links ==
- GCatholic.org, with Google map & satellite photo - data for all sections
- Catholic Hierarchy
- Diocese website
- Jan Fijałek: Ustalenie chronologii biskupów włocławskich, Kraków 1894
