= Żukowo =

Town in Pomeranian Voivodeship, Poland

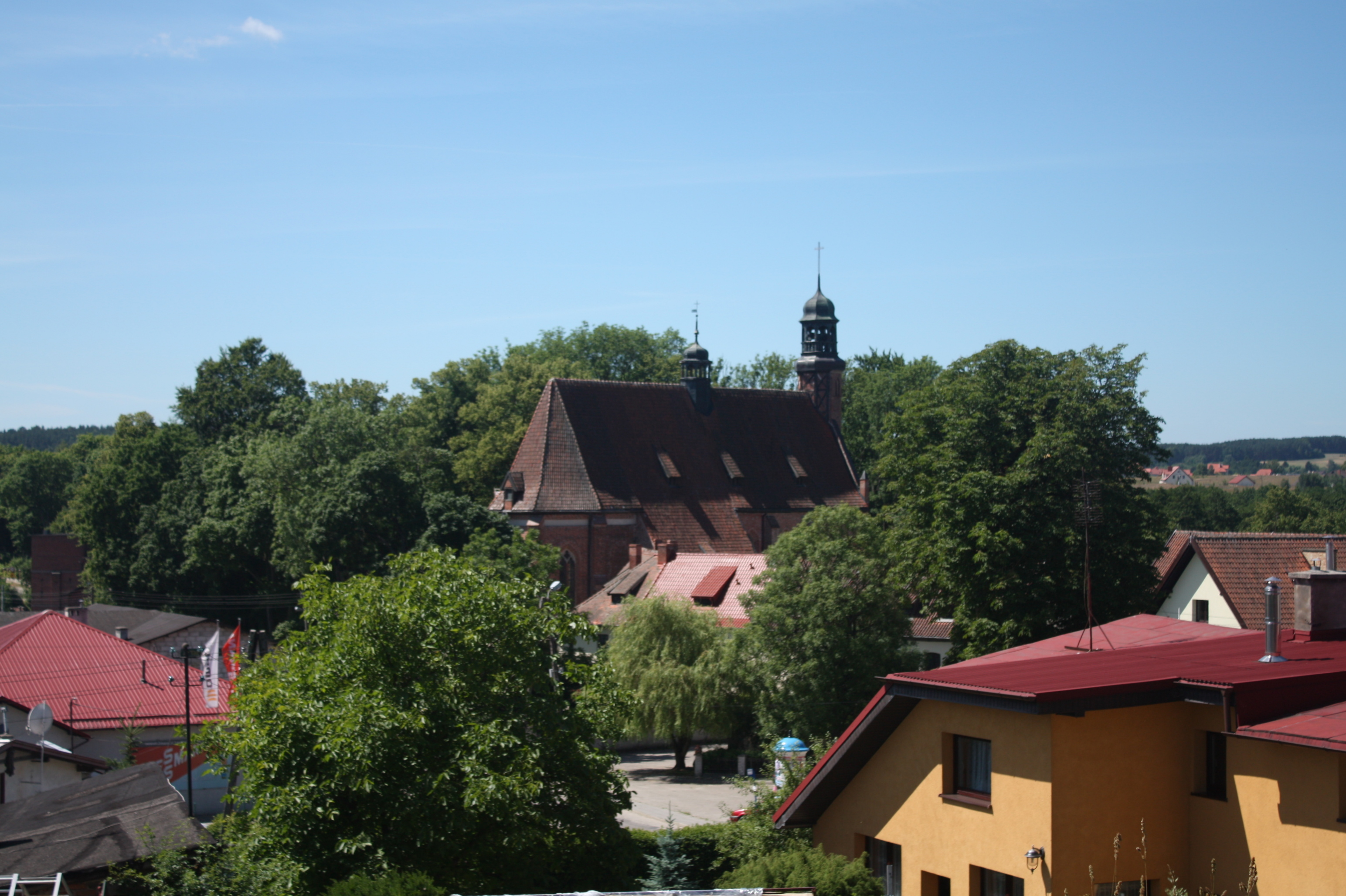
- Assumption of the Virgin Mary Church

- Coat of arms

- Location within Poland
- Coordinates: 54°20′45″N 18°21′38″E
- Country: Poland
- Voivodeship: Pomeranian
- County: Kartuzy
- Gmina: Żukowo

Area
  - Total: 4.73 km^{2} (1.83 sq mi)

Population (2018)
  - Total: 6,688
  - Density: 1,410/km^{2} (3,660/sq mi)
- Time zone: UTC+1 (CET)
  - Summer (DST): UTC+2 (CEST)
- Vehicle registration: GKA
- Primary airport: Gdańsk Airport
- Website: http://www.zukowo.pl

Żukowo [ʐuˈkɔvɔ] (Note: Kashubian: Żukòwò, German: Zuckau, Latin: Sucovia) is a town in Kartuzy County, in the Pomeranian Voivodeship of northern Poland, with 6,236 inhabitants (2005). It is located along the Radunia river in the cultural region of Kashubia in the historic region of Pomerania, about 19 km (12 mi) southwest of Gdańsk.

It is one of the youngest towns in Poland, having received its town charter in 1989, and a cultural centre of the Kashubs.

== History ==
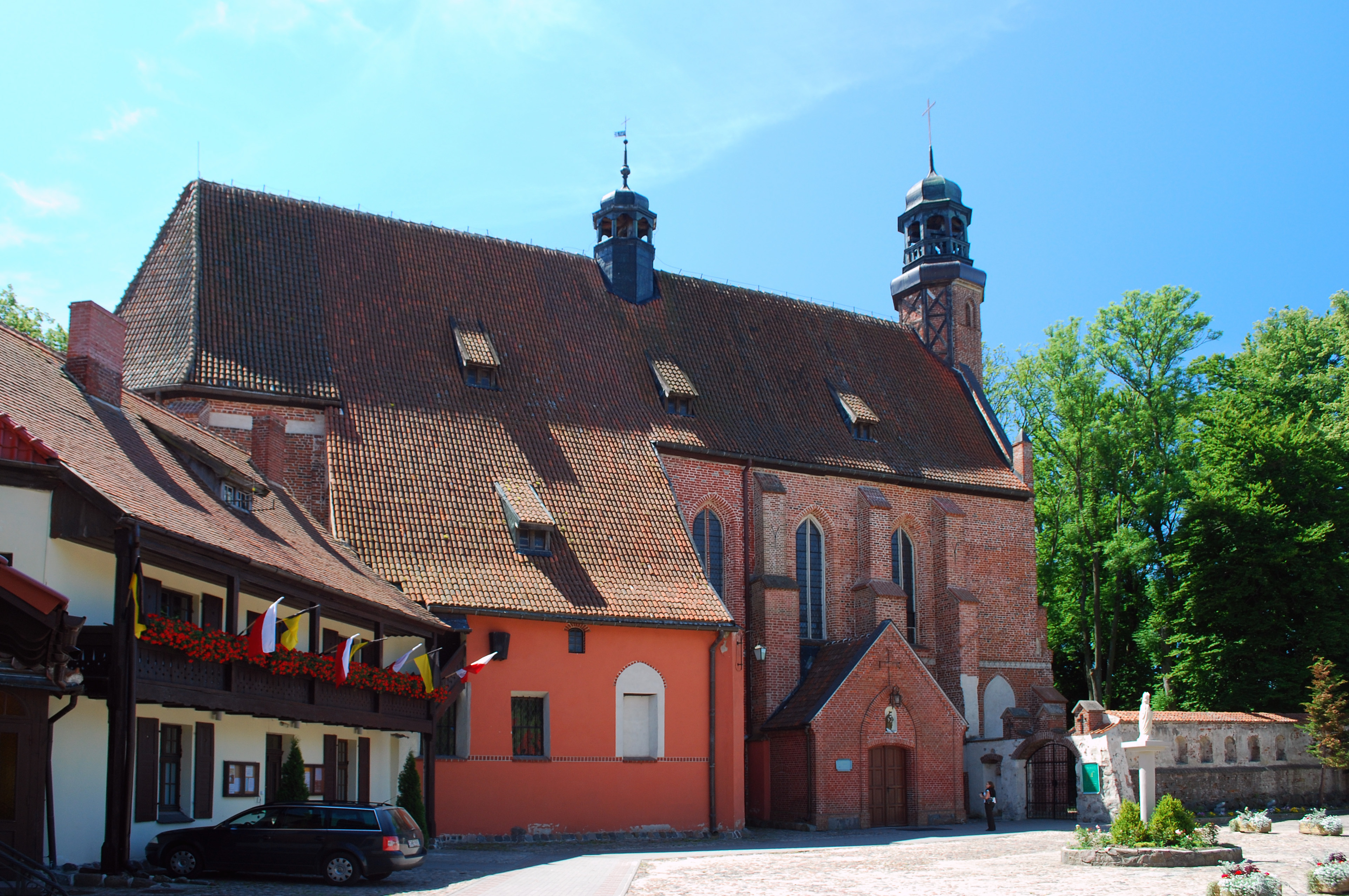
St. Mary's Assumption Church

A local church was mentioned in a document of Pope Innocent III of 1201. Żukowo was the site of a Premonstratensian (Norbertine) monastery established about 1209 by Duke Mestwin I of Pomerania. First nuns came to Żukowo from Strzelno in c. 1210. In 1224, the monastery was raided by Baltic Prussians and the nuns were killed. That was when the veneration of the 10 female martyrs from Żukowo began, and a chapel now stands on the site where the nuns were killed. The monastery was rebuilt. The church features alabaster figures made in England. In 1260, Duke Świętopełk II granted Chełmno rights to the village. Żukowo was a church village administered by the local monastery, located in the Gdańsk County in the Pomeranian Voivodeship in the Crown of the Kingdom of Poland. The monastery operated schools for girls and boys in Żukowo. Local fairs were held since the Middle Ages.

In 1626, the nuns fled the convent to escape the Swedish invaders and took refuge in Pokrzywno. In 1630, the nuns returned to Żukowo, but soon fled again, this time to Chmielno, to escape an epidemic. During the next Polish–Swedish war, the nuns rented a townhouse and lived in Gdańsk.

Żukowo was annexed by the Kingdom of Prussia in the First Partition of Poland in 1772. Afterwards, as Zuckau, it belonged to the Karthaus district in the province of West Prussia in Prussia and, from 1871, Germany. The Prussian government confiscated the property of the monastery. In 1834, the monastery was closed down. The last nun, Agnieszka Bojanowska, died in 1862. According to the census of 1910, it had a population of 1,379, of which 1,037 were Kashubians or Poles and 339 were Germans. Żukowo was restored to Poland, after the country regained independence following World War I.

During World War II it was under German occupation, and was a place of internment for prisoners of war from the United Kingdom. Local priest Bernard Gołomski was among 10 Polish priests murdered by the German Einsatzkommando 16 in the forest near Kartuzy in September 1939, and inhabitants of Żukowo were among Poles massacred in nearby Kaliska in October and November 1939. The local Polish police chief was murdered by the Russians in the Katyn massacre in 1940. There are graves of prisoners of the Stutthof concentration camp in Żukowo. It was restored to Poland in 1945.

== Culture ==
=== Embroidery ===
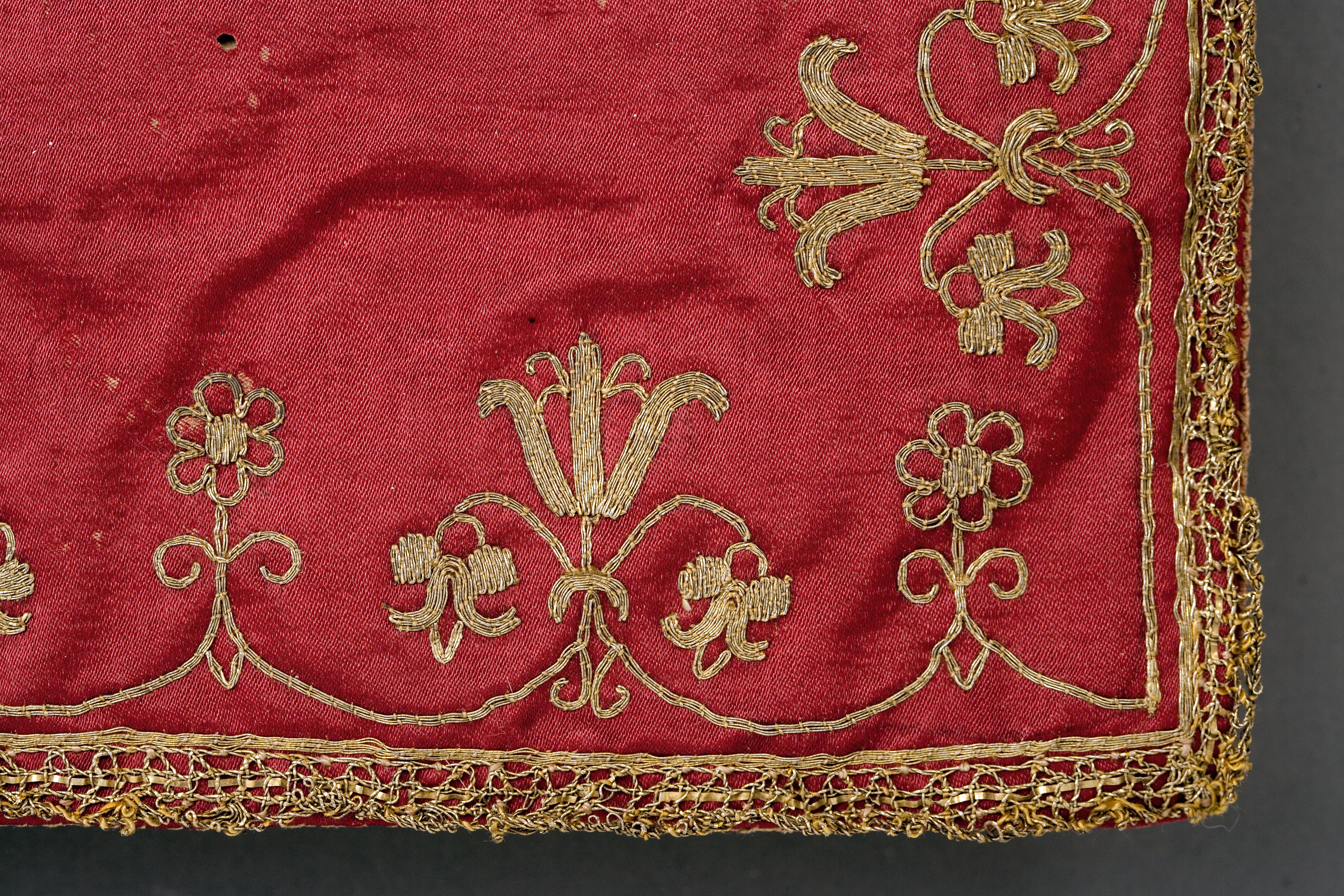
The embroidery was made with gold threads

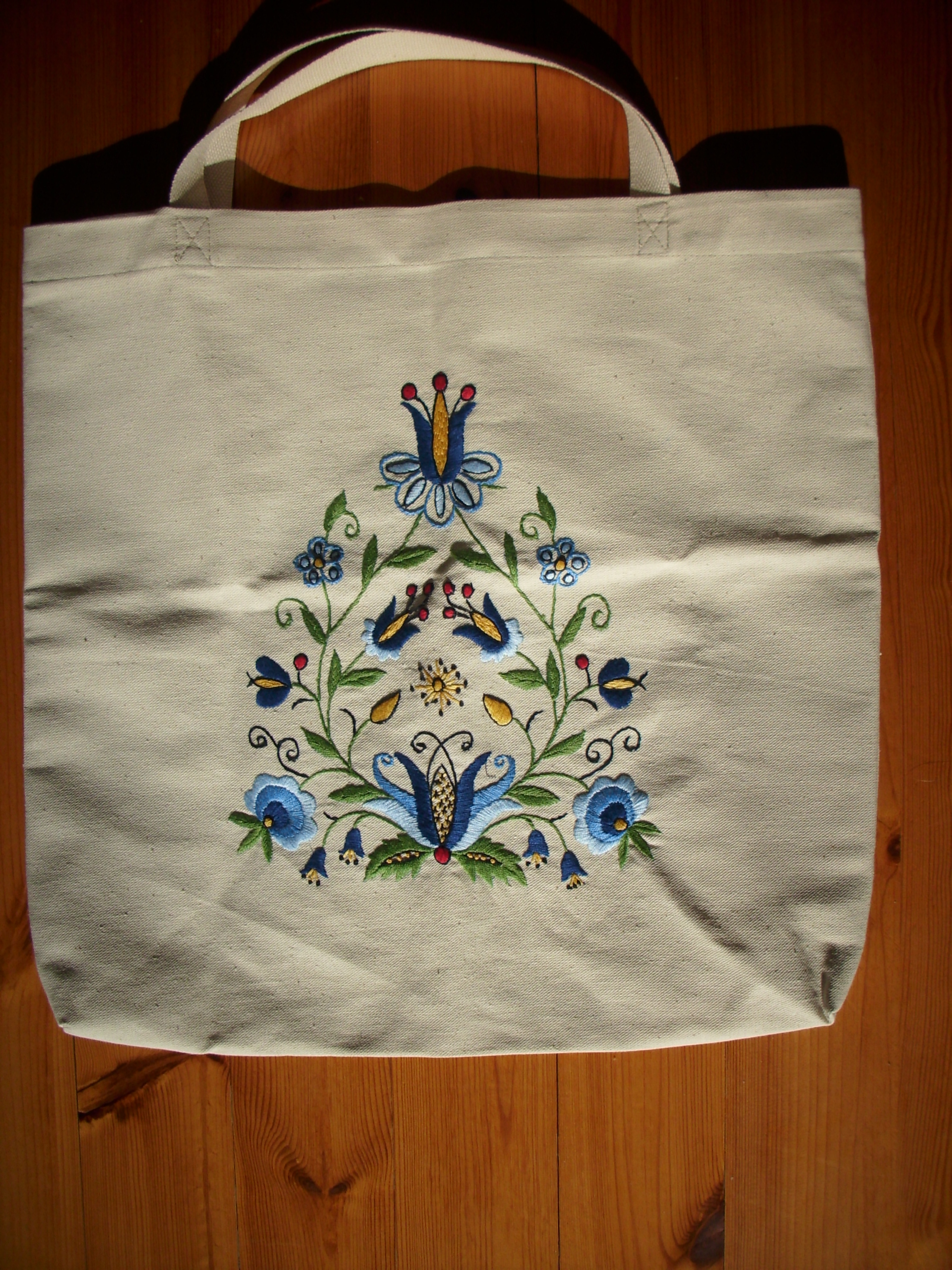
The embroidery of Żukowo school of Kashubian embroidery

Here the Kashubian embroidery is still in use. In Kashubia decorated women's bonnets were called zlotnice. Norbertine nuns in Żukowo made them in the 18th century. The embroidery was made with silver or gold threads. Women's bonnets designing contains motifs similar to church embroideries and this were based on baroque style. The nuns were teaching noblemen's and rich Kashubian peasants' daughters how to make embroidery – one of them was Marianna Okuniewska from Żukowo (born 1818).

Zlotnice were very expensive. The nuns probably stopped making them after the region was annexed by the Kingdom of Prussia during the First Partition of Poland in 1772 and the nunnery was closed in 1834. Granddaughters of Marianna – Zofia (born 1896) and Jadwiga Ptach started reaktivating of Kashubian embroidery called Żukowo's school before World War II. Embroideries made here in this time link often to the zlotnice bonnets and antependiums. Kashubian embroidery was again made after the war at Żukowo. Its main decorative elements are flowers and plant motifs. Embroidresses who are deserved for the Kashubian embroidery, for example are: Marianna Ptach, Zofia Ptach, Jadwiga Ptach, Maria Nowicka, Wanda Dzierzgowska, Bernadeta Reglinska, Ewa Wendt and others. Zukowo school of Kashubian embroidery is important intangible cultural heritage. The town's coat of arms since 1989 feature among other things the palmette of Kashubian embroidery.

== Sports ==
The town's most notable sports club is handball team GKS Żukowo, which competes in the I Liga (Polish second tier).

== Notable people ==
- Wiesław Mering (born 1945 in Żukowo), Polish Roman Catholic bishop.

== Literature ==
- Wilhelm Brauer (ed.): Der Kreis Karthaus - Ein westpreußisches Heimatbuch, Radke, Lübeck 1978 (in German)
- Joshua C. Blank: Creating Kashubia: History, Memory, and Identity in Canada's First Polish Community, 2016, p. 47
