= Piotr Mieszkowski (Junior) =

17th-century Roman Catholic bishop

Most Reverend Piotr Mieszkowski
- Auxiliary Bishop of Włocławek; Titular Bishop of Marocco o Marruecos
- Church: Catholic Church
- Diocese: Diocese of Włocławek
- In office: 1678–1696

Orders
- Consecration: 20 August 1679 by Stanisław Sarnowski

Personal details
- Born: 1630 Poznań, Poland
- Died: 1696 (aged 66)

Piotr Mieszkowski, Junior (Polish: Piotr Mieszkowski, młodszy) (1630–1696) was a Roman Catholic prelate who served as Auxiliary Bishop of Włocławek (1678–1696) and Titular Bishop of Marocco o Marruecos (1678–1696).

== Biography ==
Piotr Mieszkowski was born in 1630 in Poznań, Poland. On 6 June 1678, he was appointed during the papacy of Pope Innocent XI as Auxiliary Bishop of Włocławek and Titular Bishop of Marocco o Marruecos. On 20 August 1679, he was consecrated bishop by Stanisław Sarnowski, Bishop of Włocławek, with Stanisław Kazimierz Dąmbski, Bishop of Lutsk, and Wojciech Stawowski, Titular Bishop of Petra in Palaestina, serving as co-consecrators. He served as Auxiliary Bishop of Włocławek until his death in 1696.

While bishop, he was the principal co-consecrator of Tomasz Bogoria Skotnicki, Auxiliary Bishop of Chelmno and Titular Bishop of Lycopolis (1686).

== External links and additional sources ==
- Cheney, David M. "Diocese of Włocławek (Kujawy, Kalisze)". Catholic-Hierarchy.org. (for Chronology of Bishops) ^{[self-published]}
- Chow, Gabriel. "Diocese of Włocławek (Poland)". GCatholic.org. (for Chronology of Bishops) ^{[self-published]}
- Cheney, David M. "Marocco o Marruecos (Titular See)". Catholic-Hierarchy.org. (for Chronology of Bishops) ^{[self-published]}
- Chow, Gabriel. "Titular Episcopal See of Marocco (Morocco)". GCatholic.org. (for Chronology of Bishops) ^{[self-published]}

Catholic Church titles
| Preceded by | Auxiliary Bishop of Włocławek; 1678–1696 | Succeeded by |
| Preceded by Valerio Maccioni | Titular Bishop of Marocco o Marruecos; 1678–1696 | Succeeded by Jan Skarbek |
