= Wiesław Mering =

Polish Roman Catholic bishop (born 1945)

- Bishop Emeritus of Włocławek
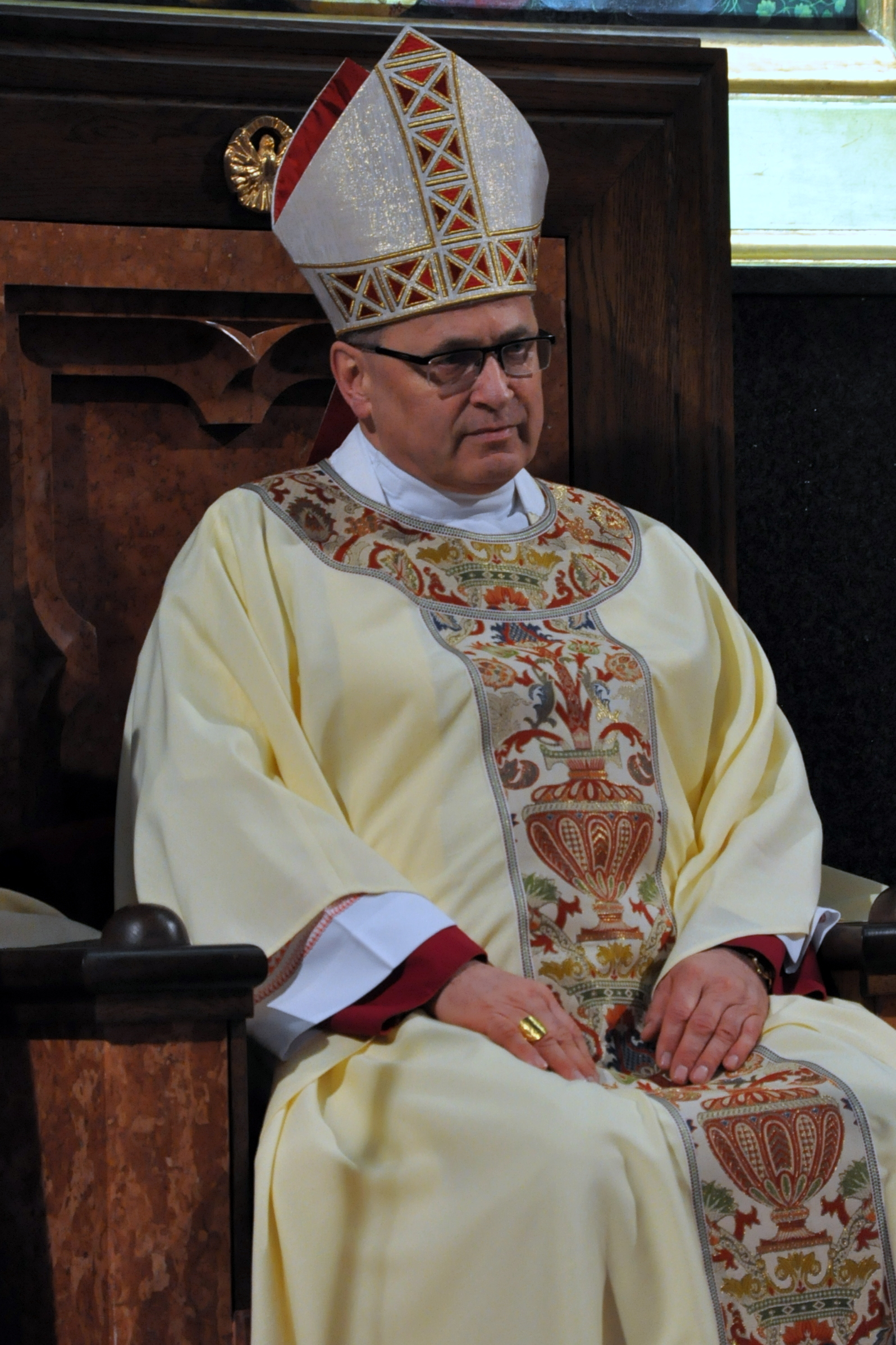
- Mering in April 2012
- Appointed: 25 March 2003
- Term ended: 27 April 2021

Orders
- Ordination: 21 May 1972 by Zygfryd Kowalski
- Consecration: 26 April 2003 by Józef Kowalczyk

Personal details
- Born: 10 December 1945 (age 80) Zukowo, Provisional Government of National Unity
- Motto: lustita, pax et gaudium; (Justice, Peace and Joy)
- Coat of arms

Wiesław Alojzy Mering (born 10 December 1945 in Żukowo) is a Polish Roman Catholic bishop.

Ordained to the priesthood on 21 May 1972, Mering was named bishop of the Roman Catholic Diocese of Włocławek, Poland on 25 March 2003.
