= Rajko =

Given name

Rajko (Serbian Cyrillic: Рајко, pronounced [rǎːjko]) is a masculine given name and may refer to:

- Rajko Aleksić (born 1947), former Serbian football defender
- Rajko Brežančić (born 1989), Serbian footballer
- Rajko Ray Bogdanović (born 1979), Serbian engineer for information technologies
- Rayko Daskalov (1886–1923), Bulgarian interwar politician of the Bulgarian Agrarian People's Union (BAPU)
- Rajko Doleček (1925–2017), Czech doctor and writer
- Rajko Dujmić (1954–2020), Croatian songwriter, composer and music producer best known as a member of the pop group Novi fosili
- Rajko Đurić (1947–2020), Serbian Romani writer and academic
- Rajko Grlić (born 1947), Croatian film director and producer
- Rajko Igić (born 1937), Serbian doctor and scientist
- Rajko Janjanin (born 1957), former Serbian football player
- Rajko Jokanović (born 1971), Serbian volleyball player
- Rajko Kojić (1956–1997), Serbian and former Yugoslav guitarist, played with band Riblja Čorba
- Rajko Kuzmanović (born 1931), Serb politician in Bosnia and Herzegovina
- Rajko Lekić (born 1981), Danish footballer
- Rajko Ljubič, Bačkan ethnic Croat film director from Subotica, Serbia
- Rajko Magić (born 1955), Croatian football manager
- Rajko Mitić (1922–2008), Serbian football player and coach
- Rajko Mueller or Isolée, microhouse artist
- Rajko Ostojić (born 1962), Croatian physician and politician
- Rajko Pavlovec (1932–2013), Slovene professor of geology, specialist in paleontology, stratigraphy, regional geology
- Rajko Perušek (1854–1917), Slovene writer, translator, linguist and bibliographer
- Rajko Pirnat (born 1951), Slovene politician, lawyer and professor, former Minister of Justice of Slovenia
- Rajko Prodanović (born 1986), Serbian handballer
- Rajko Ray Radović (born 1978), fitness record-holder, BBC Last Man Standing, songwriter
- Rajko od Rasine (1413–1441), Serbian nobleman that had the title of Grand Čelnik
- Rajko Rep (born 1990), Slovenian football midfielder
- Rajko Tavčar (born 1974), Slovenian football player
- Rajko Toroman (born 1955), Serbian professional basketball coach
- Rajko Uršič (born 1981), Slovenian futsal player
- Rajko Vujadinović (born 1956), retired footballer
- Rayko Zhinzifov (1839–1877), Bulgarian National Revival poet and translator
- Rajko Žižić (1955–2003), Montenegrin basketball player from Milojevići, Nikšić

== See also ==
- Raicu
- Rajković
- Rajkoviće
- Rajkovac (disambiguation)
- Rajkowo
- Rajkowy
