= Rajković =

Surname

Rajković or Rajkovic (Serbian Cyrillic: Рајковић, pronounced [rǎːjkoʋitɕ]; is a surname derived from a masculine given name Rajko. Notable people with the surname include:

- Ante Rajković (born 1952), Bosnian footballer
- Emil Rajković (born 1978), Macedonian basketball player and coach
- Dušan Rajković (born 1942), Serbian chess grandmaster
- Gabriel Rajkovic (born 2011), Norwegian footballer
- Ljubiša Rajković (born 1950), Serbian footballer
- Marko Rajković (born 1992), Serbian footballer
- Miodrag Rajković (born 1972), Serbian basketball coach
- Predrag Rajković (born 1995), Serbian footballer
- Slobodan Rajković (born 1989), Serbian footballer
- Trajko Rajković (1937–1970), Yugoslav basketball player

== Other ==
- Rajković (Mionica), a Serbian village

== See also ==
- Rajkoviće
- Rajović
- Rakovci (disambiguation)
- Rašković
- Raškoviće
- Raškovice
