= Międzyłęż =

Village in Pomeranian Voivodeship, Poland

- Village
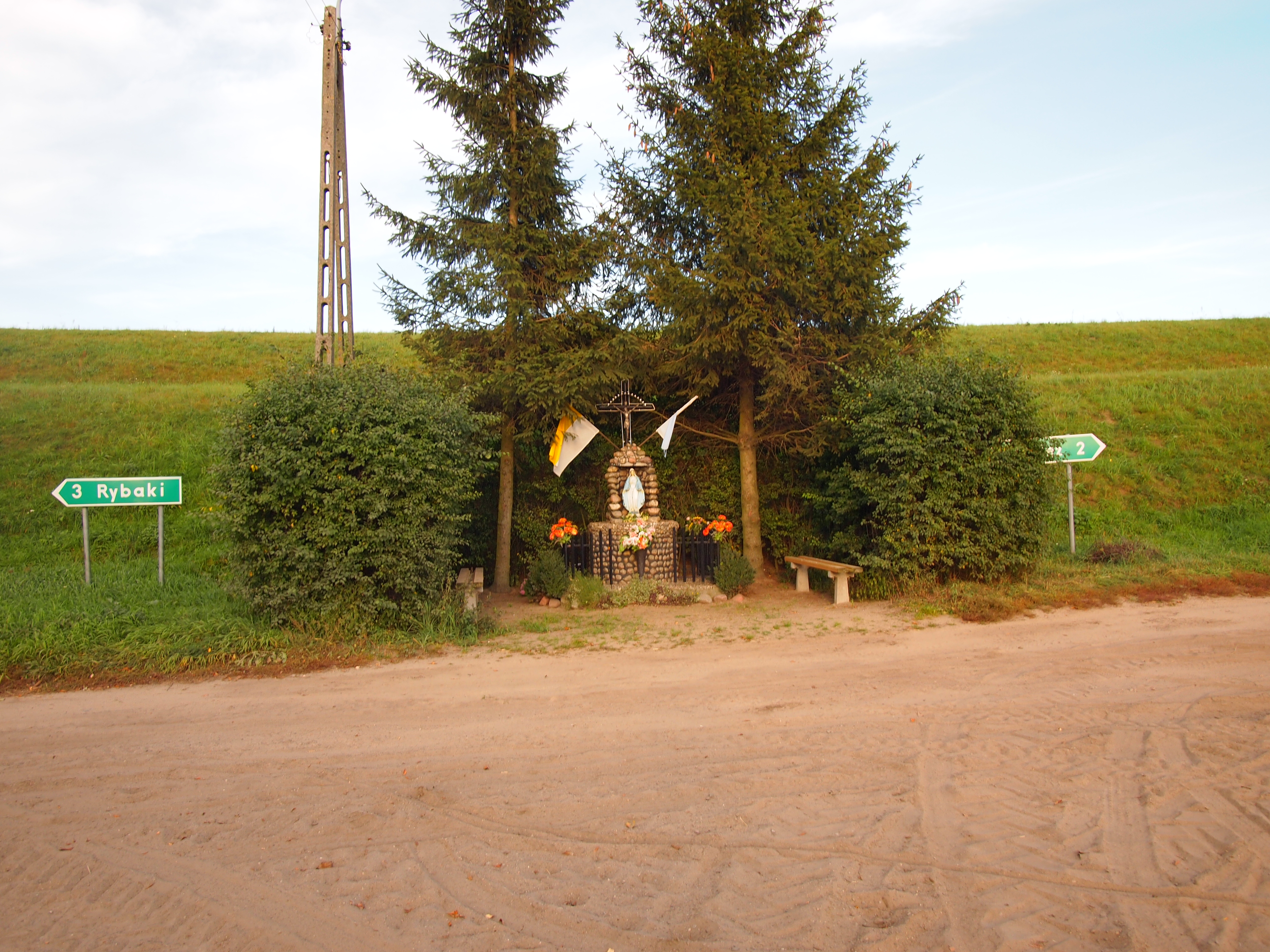
- Wayside shrine

- Location within Poland
- Coordinates: 53°56′58″N 18°50′32″E
- Country: Poland
- Voivodeship: Pomeranian
- County: Tczew
- Gmina: Pelplin
- Population: 382
- Time zone: UTC+1 (CET)
  - Summer (DST): UTC+2 (CEST)
- Vehicle registration: GTC

Międzyłęż [mjɛnˈd͡zɨwɛ̃ʂ] is a village in the administrative district of Gmina Pelplin, within Tczew County, Pomeranian Voivodeship, in northern Poland. It is located within the ethnocultural region of Kociewie in the historic region of Pomerania.

The settlements Stary Międzyłęż and Nowy Międzyłęż are integral parts of the village.

Międzyłęż was a royal village of the Polish Crown, administratively located in the Tczew County in the Pomeranian Voivodeship.
