= Hilary Paweł Januszewski =

Polish Carmelite friar

Blessed Hilary Paweł Januszewski O. Carm.
- Pawel Januszewski

Priest and Martyr
- Born: 11 June 1907; Krajenka, Poland
- Died: 25 March 1945 (aged 37); Dachau, Germany
- Venerated in: Roman Catholic Church
- Beatified: 1999

Hilary Paweł Januszewski, O.Carm (June 11, 1907, in Krajenki – March 25, 1945, in Dachau concentration camp), was a Polish priest, Carmelite friar of the Ancient Observance and Catholic priest. One of the 108 Martyrs of World War II, he served as prior of a monastery in Kraków before being arrested in 1940 and held at Sachsenhausen and Dachau, eventually dying of typhoid at the latter.

== Biography ==
Januszewski was born in Krajenka to Marcin and Marianna Januszewski (née Teil). He completed his primary education at Gręblin and attended a gymnasium in Suchary from 1922–1924, though he withdrew after completing its second grade due to financial difficulty. He attended another gymnasium in Pawlikowice between 1926 and 1927, and later obtained his matura. On 20 September 1927, Januszewski entered the Carmelite Order, taking the religious name Hilary. Completing his novitiate at Lviv, he professed his simple vow on 30 November 1928. After completing theological studies in Kraków, he was sent in November 1931 to Rome; in the same year, he made his solemn vow. He was ordained a priest on 15 July 1934, receiving a Licentiate of Sacred Theology in 1935 from the Pontifical University of St. Thomas Aquinas, Angelicum.

After obtaining his licenciate, Januszewski returned to Poland, where he was made a prefect and professor of dogmatic theology and church history of the Carmelite institute in Kraków; he was appointed prior of the community there on 1 November 1939. On 4 December 1940, he was arrested by the Gestapo in place of his friars, after stating that he was their prior and he represented the entire monastery. He was first held at Montelupich Prison, then was transferred to Sachsenhausen and to Dachau in April 1941, where he was assigned the identification number 27648.

In February 1945, in the course of a large outbreak of typhoid, Januszewski volunteered to serve those who were dying in an isolated makeshift building because, as he said, he was more needed there. He contracted the disease himself and died there on 25 March 1945; his body was cremated. He was beatified on 13 June 1999 as part of the 108 Martyrs of World War II by Pope John Paul II.
