= Bielawski Las =

Settlement in Kociewie

- Hamlet
- Location within Poland
- Coordinates: 53°54′49″N 18°38′17″E
- Country: Poland
- Voivodeship: Pomeranian
- County: Tczew
- Gmina: Pelplin
- Time zone: UTC+1 (CET)
  - Summer (DST): UTC+2 (CEST)
- Postal code: 83-130
- SIMC: 0168739
- Vehicle registration: GTC

Bielawski Las (formerly German: Bielawkerweide, then Bühlauweideis 1942-45) a hamlet in the administrative district of Gmina Pelplin, within Tczew County, Pomeranian Voivodeship, in northern Poland. It is located in the ethnocultural region of Kociewie.

== History ==
In 1848, a forestry district near Pelplin, named Nadleśnictwo Pelplin, was established from which the settlement of Bielawkerweide (Bielawski Las in Polish) grew. In interbellum Poland the village became part of the Pomeranian Voivodeship, before it was annexed by Nazi Germany as part of Reichsgau Danzig-West Prussia. During this time its former name, Bielawkerweide, was restored until 1942 when it was renamed Bühlauweide. After its liberation by allied troops in March 1945, the village became part of the Gdańsk Voivodeship until 1999 when it was merged into the Pomeranian Voivodeship.
