= Stocki =

Stocki may refer to:

- Stocki (surname)
- Stocki Młyn, a village in northern Poland
- Las Stocki, a village in eastern Poland
- Ernst Stockinger, a character in German television series Inspector Rex

== See also ==
- Stocky (disambiguation)
