= Bielawki, Tczew County =

Village in Pomeranian Voivodeship, Poland

Bielawki
- Village
- Location within Poland
- Coordinates: 53°54′47″N 18°38′54″E
- Country: Poland
- Voivodeship: Pomeranian
- County: Tczew
- Gmina: Pelplin

Population
  - Total: 360
- Time zone: UTC+1 (CET)
  - Summer (DST): UTC+2 (CEST)
- Vehicle registration: GTC

Bielawki [bjɛˈlafki] is a village in the administrative district of Gmina Pelplin, within Tczew County, Pomeranian Voivodeship, in northern Poland. It is located in the ethnocultural region of Kociewie in the historic region of Pomerania.

== History ==
The first mention of a settlement at Bielawki dates back to 1615. By 1895, the village was recorded as having 178 inhabitants.
