= Rożental, Pomeranian Voivodeship =

Village in Pomeranian Voivodeship, Poland

Rożental
- Village
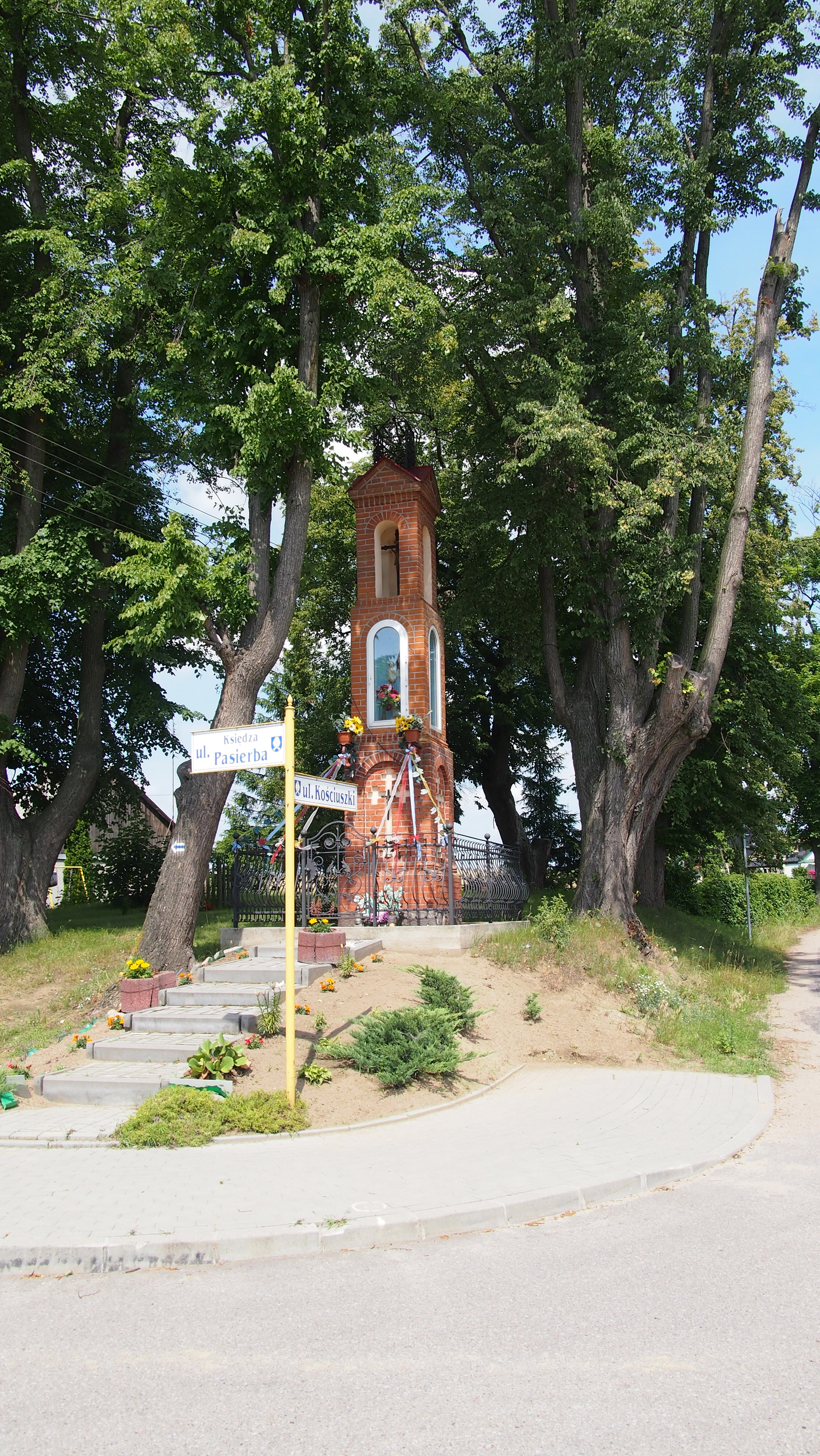
- Wayside shrine in Rożental

- Location within Poland
- Coordinates: 53°54′43″N 18°41′19″E
- Country: Poland
- Voivodeship: Pomeranian
- County: Tczew
- Gmina: Pelplin
- Population: 550
- Time zone: UTC+1 (CET)
  - Summer (DST): UTC+2 (CEST)
- Vehicle registration: GTC

Rożental [rɔˈʐɛntal] is a village in the administrative district of Gmina Pelplin, within Tczew County, Pomeranian Voivodeship, in northern Poland. It is located within the ethnocultural region of Kociewie in the historic region of Pomerania.

== History ==
Rożental was a private church village of the monastery in Pelplin, administratively located in the Tczew County in the Pomeranian Voivodeship of the Kingdom of Poland.

During the German occupation of Poland (World War II), in 1941, the Einsatzkompanie Gotenhafen, Schutzpolizei and SS carried out expulsions of Poles, whose houses and farms were then handed over to German colonists as part of the Lebensraum policy. Expelled Poles were enslaved as forced labour and sent either to German colonists in the region or to Germany.

== Transport ==
The Polish A1 motorway runs nearby, west of the village.
