= Młynik, Pomeranian Voivodeship =

Village in Pomeranian Voivodeship, Poland

Młynik
- Settlement
- Location within Poland
- Coordinates: 53°55′24″N 18°46′31″E
- Country: Poland
- Voivodeship: Pomeranian
- County: Tczew
- Gmina: Pelplin
- Time zone: UTC+1 (CET)
  - Summer (DST): UTC+2 (CEST)
- Vehicle registration: GTC

Młynik [ˈmwɨnik] is a settlement in the administrative district of Gmina Pelplin, within Tczew County, Pomeranian Voivodeship, in northern Poland. It is located within the ethnocultural region of Kociewie in the historic region of Pomerania.
