= Katy Carr =

British singer-songwriter and musician

- Born: Nottingham, England
- Genres: Folk, pop
- Occupations: Singer-songwriter, musician
- Instrument: Vocals, keyboards, ukulele, banjolele
- Years active: 2001–present
- Label: Deluce Recordings
- Website: katycarr.com

Katy Carr is a British singer-songwriter and musician known for her songs about Polish history. A fan of the 1930s and 1940s, she plays vintage instruments and wears clothing and hairstyles from the period. Although she was born in England, she lived in Poland for the first five years of her life. Her album Paszport, a tribute to those who fought in World War II, won Best Concept Album from the Independent Music Awards in 2014. In 2016 she was given Poland's Pro Patria Medal.

== Life ==
Carr was born in Nottingham, England to a Polish mother and a Scottish-English father, but until she was five years old, lived in Poland where her parents met and her father worked. Her English grandmother's stories about the 1930s/1940s stirred an interest in the era, as did photographs of the clothing and hairstyles. She admired Édith Piaf and female pilots Amy Johnson and Amelia Earhart.

An undisciplined girl, she joined the Air Cadets, a youth group affiliated with the Royal Air Force, and learned to fly.

== Career ==
=== 2009: Kommander's Car ===
The single "Kommander's Car" was inspired by Kazimierz Piechowski's escape from an Auschwitz concentration camp. Piechowski was sent to Auschwitz in 1940. Two years later a fellow prisoner who repaired the cars of SS officers suggested they steal a car. Carr's song is about their escape.

=== Kazik and the Kommander's Car documentary ===
Kazik and the Kommander's Car is a documentary produced by Carr and directed by British film maker Hannah Lovell. It documents Carr's first visit to meet and present her tribute song, "Kommander's Car", to Polish World War II veteran Kazimierz Piechowski. Piechowski was present for the debut of the documentary, which included a concert on 27 January 2010 in Warsaw, Poland to mark the 65th anniversary of liberation of Auschwitz. Two years later a DVD of the film was released. The film was shown in museums and festivals in England and Poland.

=== Touring and humanitarian work ===
In March 2011, Katy Carr and the Aviators embarked on The Escapologist Tour. Kazimierz Piechowski was present for the first two London performances. The aim of the Escapologist Tour was, in Carr's words, "to help unite both British and Polish communities throughout the UK through film, music and the sharing of stories." Events included concerts and screenings of Kazik and the Kommander's Car, as well as outreach with Polish retirement and care homes. Carr sang Polish folk songs to World War II veterans. In 2012, the tour was nominated for the National Lottery Good Causes Awards. She embarked on a US Polish diaspora tour and performed in Chicago, and New York City. Short films about Polish history from the Polish Institute and Sikorski Museum archives were shown by Hannah Lovell, director of Kazik and the Kommander's Car. Carr studied Polish at Jagiellonian University so she could communicate better with the Polish media during her tour and also to "help to share the joys of learning the Polish language".

=== 2012: Paszport ===
Carr's fourth album, Paszport, contains lyrics in English and Polish. She worked with British producer Nigel George Hoyle, with musicians from Klezmer, Gypsy jazz and Folk music to create a sound that would be both traditional and contemporary. The album was released in Poland on 17 September 2012 to mark the anniversary of the Soviet invasion, National Independence Day in Poland and Remembrance Day (also known as Poppy Day or Armistice Day). Paszport was released in the UK on 11 November 2012 to positive reviews, some considering it one of the best albums of the year.

Aside from the single about Piechowski, the album's subjects include the Soviet invasion of Poland, the Polish resistance and the repression of Polish people by the Soviets. Regarding the title of the album, Carr cited a poem by Jerzy Harasymowicz: "it's not a very well known poem, but I think it says everything about my album, 'Masz paszport, więc jesteś' – "You have a passport, therefore you exist".

In 2013, Carr was given the Polish Daily Award for Culture.

In October 2020, Carr released the final part of her 'Polish Roots Trilogy' (previously Paszport and Polonia) with the album, Providence.

== Discography ==
- 2001: Screwing Lies
- 2003: Passion Play
- 2008: The Crow Club (compilation album)
- 2009: "Kommander's Car" (single)
- 2009: Coquette
- 2012: "Kommander's Car" (remastered single)
- 2012: Kazik and the Kommander's Car (DVD)
- 2012: Paszport
- 2015: Polonia
- 2020: Providence

== Awards ==
- 2011: Nominated for London Music Award
- 2012: Nominated for National Lottery Good Causes Award
- 2013: Polish Daily Award for Culture
- 2013: Nominated for Best Artist, Songlines Music Awards
- 2014: Best Concept Album, Paszport, Independent Music Awards
- 2014: Honorary membership, Polish 1st Armoured Division
- 2016: Pro Patria Medal (Poland)
- 2016: Nominated Best Concept Album, Polonia, Independent Music Awards
