= Stocky =

Stocky may refer to:

== Humans ==
- Tom Stocky
- Stocky Edwards

== Snail ==
- Stocky pebblesnail

== See also ==
- Stocki (disambiguation)
