= Kulice, Pomeranian Voivodeship =

Village in Pomeranian Voivodeship, Poland

Kulice
- Village
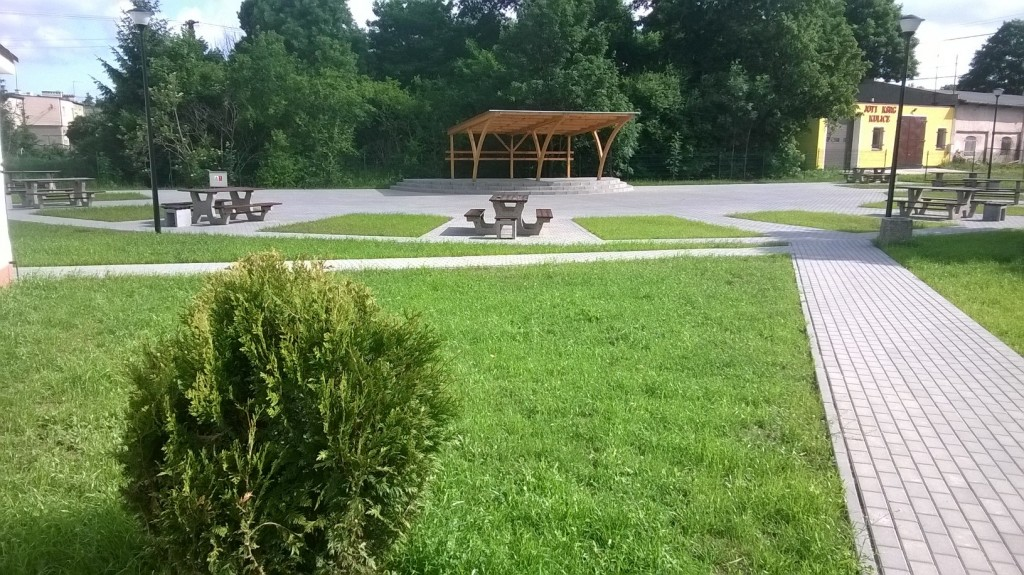

- Location within Poland
- Coordinates: 53°53′2″N 18°41′46″E
- Country: Poland
- Voivodeship: Pomeranian
- County: Tczew
- Gmina: Pelplin

Population
  - Total: 860
- Time zone: UTC+1 (CET)
  - Summer (DST): UTC+2 (CEST)
- Vehicle registration: GTC
- Website: http://kulice.ovh.org

Kulice [kuˈlit͡sɛ] is a village in the administrative district of Gmina Pelplin, within Tczew County, Pomeranian Voivodeship, in northern Poland. It is located within the ethnocultural region of Kociewie in the historic region of Pomerania.

== History ==
Kulice was a private church village of the monastery in Pelplin, administratively located in the Tczew County in the Pomeranian Voivodeship of the Kingdom of Poland.

During the German occupation of Poland (World War II), in 1939 and 1941, the occupiers carried out expulsions of Poles, whose farms were handed over to Germans in accordance with the Lebensraum policy.
