= Janiszewo, Pomeranian Voivodeship =

Village in Pomeranian Voivodeship, Poland

Janiszewo
- Village
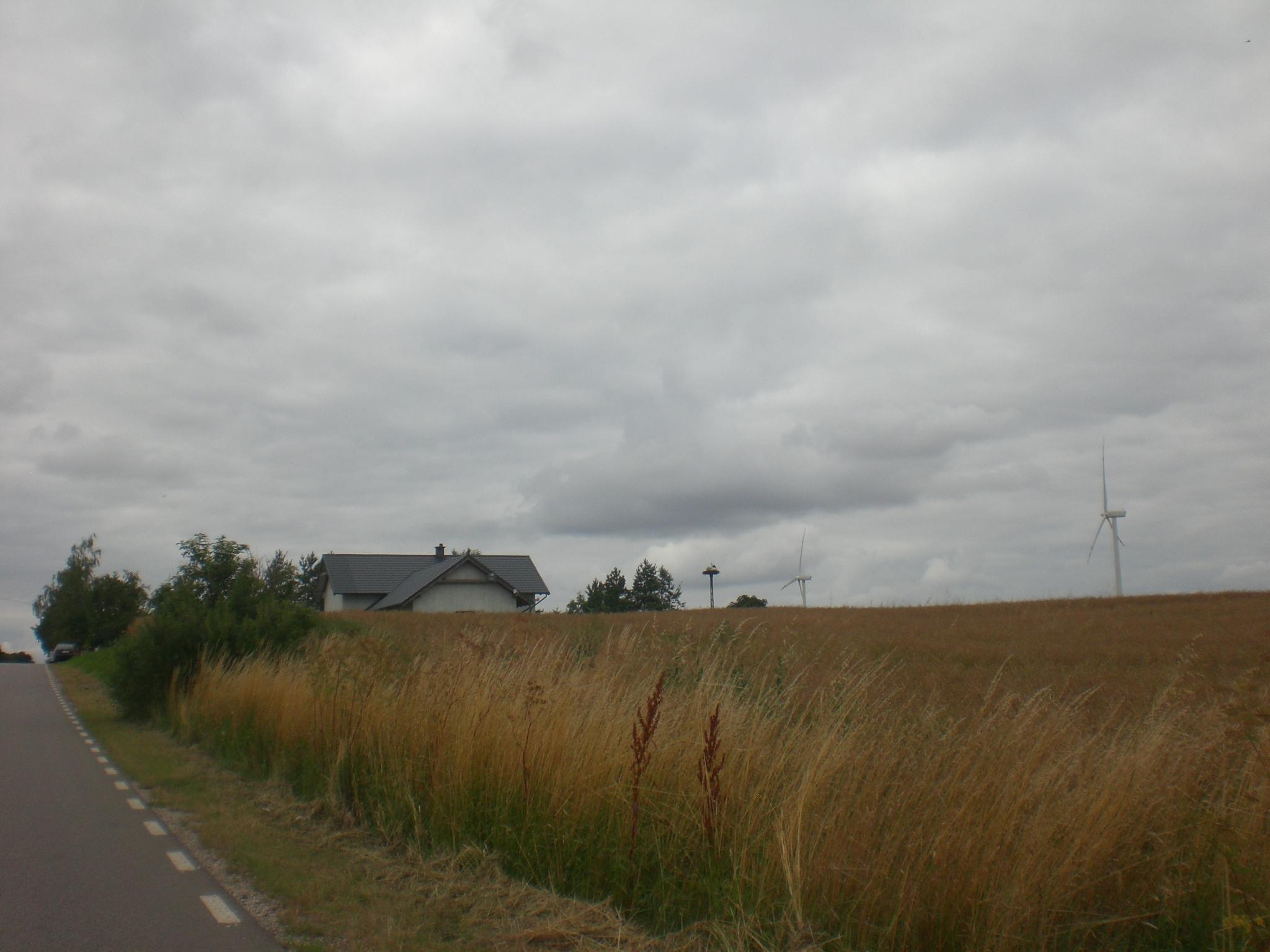

- Location within Poland
- Coordinates: 53°53′27″N 18°43′24″E
- Country: Poland
- Voivodeship: Pomeranian
- County: Tczew
- Gmina: Pelplin

Population
  - Total: 266
- Time zone: UTC+1 (CET)
  - Summer (DST): UTC+2 (CEST)
- Vehicle registration: GTC

Janiszewo [janiˈʂɛvɔ] is a village in the administrative district of Gmina Pelplin, within Tczew County, Pomeranian Voivodeship, in northern Poland. It is located within the ethnocultural region of Kociewie in the historic region of Pomerania.

Janiszewo was a royal village of the Kingdom of Poland, administratively located in the Tczew County in the Pomeranian Voivodeship.
