= Gmina Pelplin =

Administrative district in Kociewie

Gmina Pelplin Pelplin Commune
- Gmina
- Flag Coat of arms

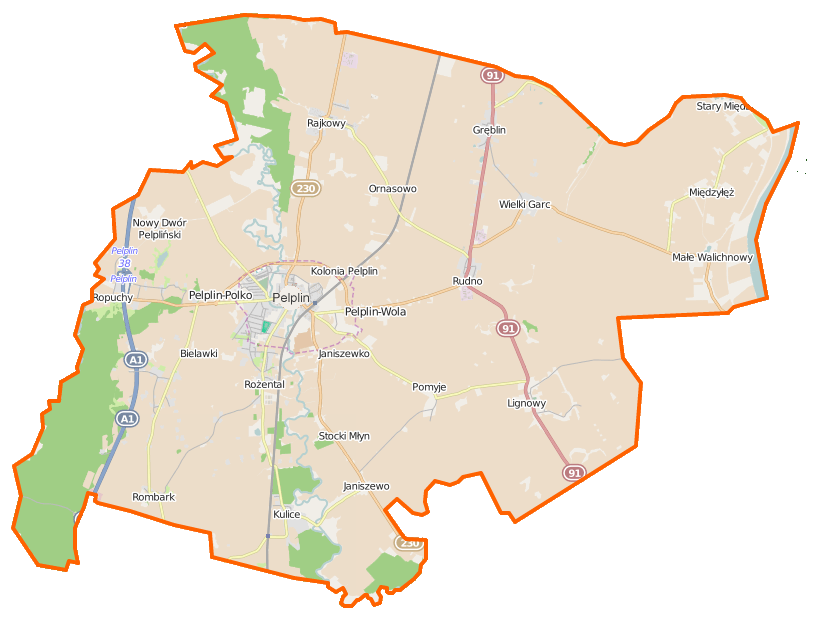
- Coordinates (Pelplin): 53°55′34″N 18°42′4″E
- Country: Poland
- Voivodeship: Pomeranian
- County: Tczew
- Seat: Pelplin

Area
  - Total: 140.45 km^{2} (54.23 sq mi)

Population (2006)
  - Total: 16,547
  - Density: 117.81/km^{2} (305.14/sq mi)
  - Urban: 8,486
  - Rural: 8,061
- Website: http://www.pelplin.pl/

Gmina Pelplin is an urban-rural gmina (administrative district) in Tczew County, Pomeranian Voivodeship, in northern Poland. Its seat is the town of Pelplin, which lies approximately 20 kilometres (12 mi) south of Tczew and 50 km (31 mi) south of the regional capital Gdańsk.

The gmina covers an area of 140.45 square kilometres (54.2 sq mi), and as of 2006 its total population is 16,547 (out of which the population of Pelplin amounts to 8,486, and the population of the rural part of the gmina is 8,061).

== Villages ==
Apart from the town of Pelplin, Gmina Pelplin contains the villages and settlements of Bielawki, Bielawski Las, Dębina, Gaj, Gręblin, Hilarowo, Janiszewko, Janiszewo, Janowo, Korytyba, Kulice, Kulice Małe, Lignowy Szlacheckie, Małe Walichnowy, Maniowo, Międzyłęż, Młynik, Nadleśnictwo, Nowy Dwór Pelpliński, Nowy Międzyłęż, Ornasowo, Pelplin-Wybudowanie, Pomyje, Pustki, Rajkowy, Rombark, Ropuchy, Rożental, Rudno, Rudnopole, Stary Międzyłęż, Stocki Młyn, Wielki Garc and Wola.

== Neighbouring gminas ==
Gmina Pelplin is bordered by the gminas of Bobowo, Gniew, Miłoradz, Morzeszczyn, Starogard Gdański, Subkowy and Sztum.
