= Wola, Pomeranian Voivodeship =

Village in Pomeranian Voivodeship, Poland

Wola
- Village
- Location within Poland
- Coordinates: 53°55′27″N 18°43′48″E
- Country: Poland
- Voivodeship: Pomeranian
- County: Tczew
- Gmina: Pelplin

Population
  - Total: 153
- Time zone: UTC+1 (CET)
  - Summer (DST): UTC+2 (CEST)
- Vehicle registration: GTC

Wola [ˈvɔla] is a village in the administrative district of Gmina Pelplin, within Tczew County, Pomeranian Voivodeship, in northern Poland. It is located within the ethnocultural region of Kociewie in the historic region of Pomerania.

During the German occupation of Poland in World War II, on October 21, 1939, three local Poles (parish priest, parish vicar, medical doctor) were murdered in the village by the Germans (see also Nazi war crimes in occupied Poland during World War II).
