= Kazimierz Piechowski =

Kociewian engineer, political prisoner, and Holocaust survivor (1919–2017)

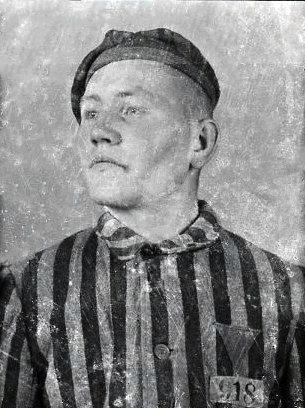
- A booking photograph of Piechowski at Auschwitz concentration camp
- Born: 3 October 1919; Rajkowy, Kociewie, Second Polish Republic
- Died: 15 December 2017 (aged 98); Gdańsk, Poland
- Known for: Escape from Auschwitz

Kazimierz Piechowski (pronounced [kaˈʑimjɛʂ pjɛˈxɔfskʲi]; 3 October 1919 – 15 December 2017) was a Polish engineer, and boy scout during the Second Polish Republic, and political prisoner of the Nazis held at Auschwitz concentration camp. He was a soldier of the Polish Home Army (Armia Krajowa), and again became a political prisoner under the post-war communist government of Poland for seven years.

He is best known for his escape from Auschwitz, along with three other prisoners.

== Imprisonment ==
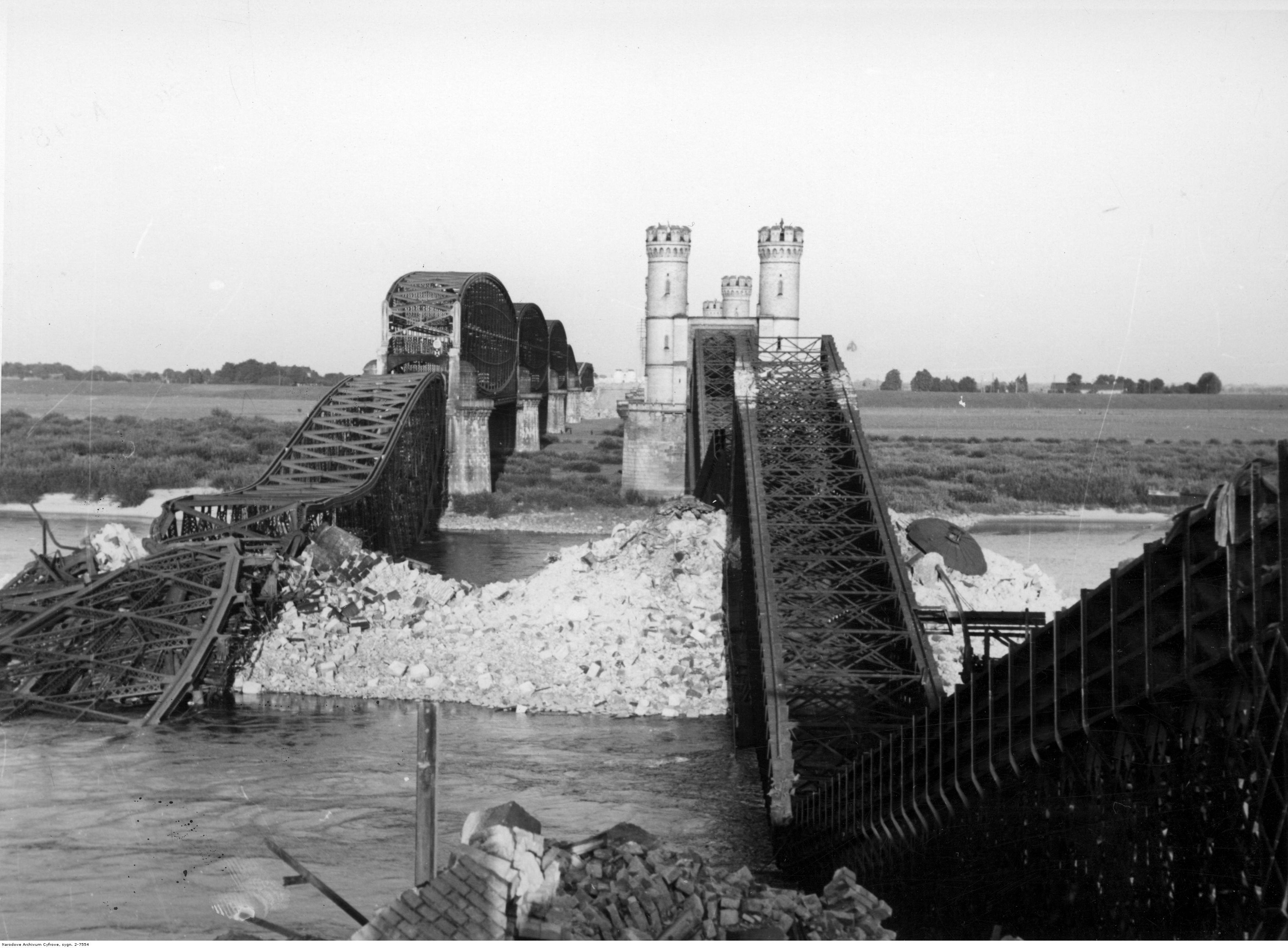
Railway bridge over the Vistula river; Piechowski was in a forced work gang clearing the rubble

After the collapse of Polish resistance to the German and Soviet invasion, Piechowski along with fellow boy scout Alfons "Alki" Kiprowski (born 9 October 1921), were captured by the German occupiers in their hometown of Tczew and forced into a work-gang, clearing the destroyed sections of the railway bridge over the Vistula, which had previously been blown up by the Polish military to impede Nazi transports. Polish Boy Scouts were among the groups targeted by the Gestapo and the Selbstschutz.

Both decided to leave Tczew on 12 November 1939 and attempted to get to France to join the Polish Army. While crossing the border into Hungary, they were captured by a German patrol. They were sent to a Gestapo prison in Baligrod before being transferred to a prison in Sanok, and then to Montelupich Prison in Kraków. Their last stop before Auschwitz was a prison in Wiśnicz.

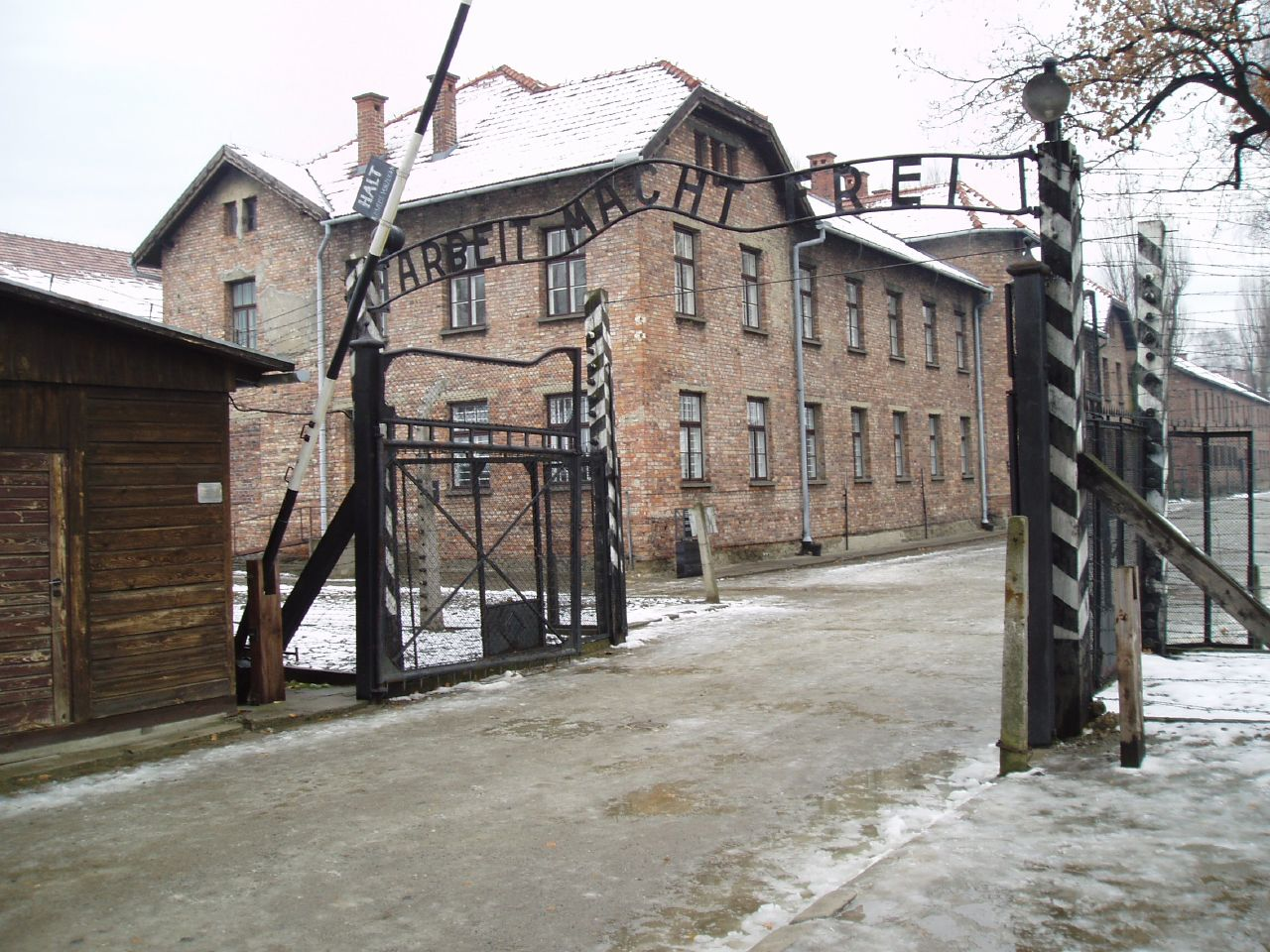
Main gate to Auschwitz I

Piechowski was sent to Auschwitz as a political prisoner, a Legionsgaenger – one wishing to join Polish military formations abroad.

The Polish Boy Scouts were labeled as a criminal organization in occupied Poland. Piechowski was among a transport of 313 other Polish deportees to Auschwitz on 20 June 1940; it was only the second transport after the initial one from Tarnów. Among this Tarnów group was another Pole who would escape in an SS officer's uniform: Edward Galinski. Galinski's escape was short-lived.

Piechowski received inmate number 918. He was in the Leichenkommando and assigned to bringing corpses to the crematorium, including those shot at the "Black Wall" by SS-Rapportfuhrer Gerhard Arno Palitzsch.

Piechowski was present when Polish priest and fellow Auschwitz prisoner Maximilian Kolbe offered to exchange places with a Polish prisoner who was among a group of ten people sentenced to be starved to death. The sentence was in retribution for a perceived escape attempt of a prisoner.

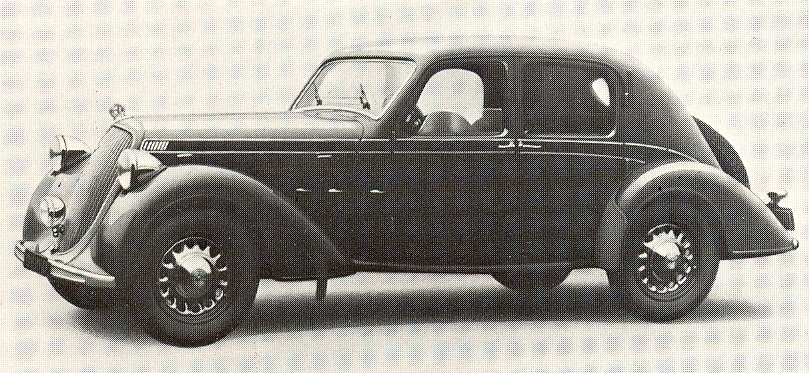
Steyr 220, similar to car used in the escape

He also had access to the list of upcoming executions, and saw that his friend, Eugeniusz Bendera, was scheduled to be executed. The two men along with a third devised an escape plan. On the morning of 20 June 1942, exactly two years after his arrival, Piechowski escaped from Auschwitz 1. He fled with Bendera, an auto mechanic from Czortków (now Chortkiv, Ukraine), Józef Lempert, a priest from Wadowice, and Stanisław Gustaw Jaster, a first lieutenant and veteran of the Invasion of Poland from Warsaw. Piechowski, who had the best knowledge of the German language within the group, held command.

They left through the main Auschwitz camp through the Arbeit Macht Frei gate. They had taken a cart and passed themselves off as a Rollwagenkommando, a work group that consisted of between four and twelve inmates pulling a freight cart instead of horses.

Bendera went to the motor pool while Piechowski, Lempert, and Jaster went to the warehouse where uniforms and weapons were stored. They entered via a coal bunker that Piechowski had helped to fill. He removed a bolt from the lid so it wouldn't self-latch when closed. Once in the building, they broke into the room containing the uniforms and weapons, arming themselves with four machine guns and eight grenades.

Bendera arrived in a Steyr 220 Sedan belonging to SS-Hauptsturmführer Paul Kreuzmann.

As a mechanic, he was often allowed to test drive cars around the camp. He entered the building and changed into an SS uniform like the others. They then all entered the car, with Bendera driving, Piechowski in the front passenger seat, Lempert and Jaster in the back. Bendera drove toward the main gate. Jaster carried a report that Witold Pilecki (deliberately imprisoned in Auschwitz to prepare intelligence about The Holocaust and who would not escape until 1943) had written for Armia Krajowa's headquarters. When they approached the gate, it did not open.

With the car stopped, Piechowski opened the door and leaned out enough for the guard to see his rank insignia and yelled at him to open the gate. The gate opened and the four drove off.

== After the escape ==
Flag of the Armia Krajowa

The prisoners abandoned the stolen escape vehicle in the vicinity of Maków Podhalański, approximately 60 kilometres (37 mi) from the camp. Piechowski eventually made his way to Ukraine, but was unable to find refuge there due to anti-Polish sentiment. He forged documents and took a false name before returning to Poland to live in Tczew, where he had previously been captured. He soon found work doing manual labor on a nearby farm, where he made contact with the Home Army and took up arms against the Nazis within the units of 2nd Lt. Adam Kusz nom de guerre Garbaty (so-called "Cursed soldiers").

His parents were arrested by the Germans in reprisal for his escape and murdered in Auschwitz. The policy of tattooing prisoners was also allegedly introduced in response to his escape. Piechowski learned after the war that a special investigative commission had arrived at Auschwitz from Berlin to answer, independently of the camp's administration, the question as to how an escape as audacious as that of Piechowski and his companions' was at all possible. This information had come from his boy-scout friend, Alfons "Alki" Kiprowski, who remained a prisoner at Auschwitz for some three more months after his escape.

After the war he attended the Gdańsk University of Technology and became an engineer, before finding work in Pomerania. He was denounced by the communist authorities for being a member of the Home Army and sentenced to 10 years in prison, of which he served 7. He was 33 years of age at the end of his sentence. After his release, he worked as an engineer for the communist government for some decades.

He declined the Order of the White Eagle when Maciej Płażyński tried to award it to him after the democratic transition. In 1989, he sold land he owned near Gdańsk and traveled with his wife to various parts of the world, visiting over 60 countries. In 2006 Piechowski was named an honorary citizen of the city of Tczew, his pre-War hometown.

Piechowski was the subject of the 2006 documentary film Uciekinier ("Man on the Run"), which was produced by Marek Tomasz Pawłowski and Małgorzata Walczak and won several international awards. In 2009, British singer Katy Carr released a song about Piechowski under the title "Kommander's Car". Another documentary from filmmaker Hannah Lovell was made in 2010 under the title Kazik and the Commander's Car.

He lived in Gdańsk. Piechowski died on 15 December 2017, aged 98.

=== Piechowski's associates ===
- Kurt Pachala (or, Pachele; born 16 October 1895), a native of Neusatz (inmate number 24). He was in charge of the motor pool (Fahrbereitschaft; or alternatively, of the food stores, the so-called Truppen Wirtschaftslager) at Auschwitz. Pachala was implicated in Piechowski's escape by the circumstantial evidence uncovered during the ensuing investigation, and as a result, was tortured and sent to the standing cell in Block 11, where he died of thirst and hunger on 14 January 1943. He is said to have been reduced at the end to eating his own shoes. His treatment and death were recounted at the Frankfurt Auschwitz Trials in 1965 which formed the basis for the 1965 play Die Ermittlung (The Investigation) by Peter Weiss. Pachala is the only known victim of reprisals for the escape within the Auschwitz concentration camp itself (apart from the family members of the escapees). It was the ruse of the fake work commando that saved other prisoners from reprisals.
- Eugeniusz Bendera (b. 13 or 14 March 1906 in Tschortkau (Polish: Czortków), Podolia), then in the Austro-Hungarian Empire. According to Kazimierz Piechowski, Bendera was the originator of the idea of the escape, and the one who conceptualized the whole plan. After the war he returned to Przedbórz to live with his wife (married 1930 and had one son), until their divorce in 1959 when he moved to Warsaw. He died sometime after 1970.
- Józef Lempart (born 19 August 1916 in Zawadka): After the escape, he was dropped off by the escapees at a monastery in Stary Sącz, a locality some 155 kilometres (96 mi) from the camp, in a state of total exhaustion. His mother was deported to Auschwitz in reprisal for his escape, where she died. He left the priesthood, married, and had a daughter. He died in 1971 after being run over by a bus while crossing a street in Wadowice.
- Stanisław Gustaw Jaster, nom de guerre Hel (b. 1 January 1921). The youngest of the escapees, Jaster was a member of the secret underground military organization ZOW. In Warsaw, he reported to the Home Army High Command about the resistance in Auschwitz and became a personal emissary of Witold Pilecki. His parents were deported to Auschwitz in reprisal for his escape, where both died (his father, Stanisław Jaster, b. 1892, having perished at Auschwitz on 3 December 1942; his mother, Eugenia Jaster, b. 1894, first deported to the Majdanek concentration camp, eventually perished at Auschwitz on 26 July 1943). He continued to fight against the German occupiers in the ranks of the Home Army as a member of one of its most important special-operations units, the Organizacja Specjalnych Akcji Bojowych (Osa–Kosa 30), but also at his own initiative taking part in engagements staged by other Home Army units, most notably participating in the successful action at the Celestynów railway junction on the night of 19 May 1943, carried out under the command of Captain Mieczysław Kurkowski nom de guerre Mietek, whose object was to free the prisoners being transported by the Nazis from the Lublin Castle prison to the Auschwitz concentration camp by train, when he gained special distinction through an act of bravery whereby he virtually single-handedly assured a victorious outcome for the operation in which 49 prisoners were freed. His comrades-in-arms have described him as a man "of enormous stature invested with extraordinary physical power".

According to the account first promulgated in a 1968 book by Aleksander Kunicki, Cichy front, Jaster was accused of collaboration with the Gestapo and executed in 1943 by members of the Home Army. This account has since been discredited as lacking foundation in documentary evidence. What now appears to be reasonably certain is that Jaster was rearrested by the Gestapo in Warsaw on 12 July 1943, and that he perished sometime between July and September of that year. The exact circumstances of his death remain however a bone of contention. Both Bendera and Piechowski – as well as many others who knew him personally – made their voices heard in an effort to rehabilitate Jaster in the wake of controversy engendered by the publication of Cichy front. It has been pointed out that the author of the book accuses Jaster – an intelligence officer of the Home Army during the War (see Operation Kutschera) named Aleksander Kunicki (1898–1986) – had himself been subsequently accused of having collaborated with the Gestapo and sentenced to death, only to have his conviction set aside by the authorities of the Communist Poland (who instead awarded him a state pension for "meritorious service to the nation" – an extraordinary outcome for an operative of the Home Army, a military arm of the Polish government in London, whose members were persecuted after the war by the Communists either with lengthy imprisonments (as in the case of Kazimierz Piechowski himself) or by death, as in the case of Witold Pilecki, Gen. Emil Fieldorf, and others).
Kunicki's book was submitted to a closely reasoned and devastating critique by Tomasz Strzembosz in 1971, which uncovered that information had been concealed or falsified with regard to the published sources Kunicki cited in support of his claims. In the slowly emerging consensus of opinion in the matter — while the uncorroborated allegations by Kunicki presented as "facts" in Cichy front remain allegations, the book is thought nevertheless to contain an element of truth concerning Jaster's ultimate fate. It would appear that after his second arrest by the Gestapo in Warsaw on 12 July 1943, Jaster may have managed to escape again (by jumping out of a speeding Gestapo car moments after having been seized in the street, together with a high-ranking Home Army commander, Mieczysław Kudelski nom de guerre Wiktor) — a feat so unprecedented that it would have aroused suspicion among the Home Army plagued by a series of devastating setbacks which could only have been attributable to a well-placed mole, leading to the execution of Jaster. No documents relating to the case have come to light. The authors of the aforementioned award-winning 2006 documentary film about Kazimierz Piechowski, Uciekinier ("Man on the Run"), Marek Tomasz Pawłowski, and Małgorzata Walczak are currently working on a sequel, centered on Jaster.
- Alfons Kiprowski (born 9 October 1921 in Świecie), Piechowski's fellow boy scout, was separately deported to Auschwitz (inmate number 801). He escaped from Auschwitz independently from Piechowski on 22 September 1942 with two other prisoners, Piotr Jaglicz (b. 29 June 1922; inmate number unknown) and Adam Szumlak (b. 16 June 1920; inmate number E-1957 [or EH-1954]).

== Bibliography ==
- Kazimierz Piechowski, et al., Byłem numerem... : świadectwa z Auschwitz, ed. K. Piechowski, Warsaw, Wydawnictwo Sióstr Loretanek, 2003, ISBN 8372571228
- Kazimierz Piechowski, My i Niemcy, Warsaw, Wydawnictwo Sióstr Loretanek, 2008, bilingual edition: text in Polish and German (the original Polish title, My i Nemcy ("We and the Germans"), is rendered Wir und die Polen ("We and the Poles") in the German section), ISBN 978-8372573087
- Szymon Datner, Ucieczki z niewoli niemieckiej, 1939–1945, Warsaw, Książka i Wiedza, 1966, pp. 229–230.
- Auschwitz: A New History by Laurence Rees. Publisher: PublicAffairs; export ed edition (2005) ISBN 978-1586483036
