= Małe Walichnowy =

Village in Pomeranian Voivodeship, Poland

- Village
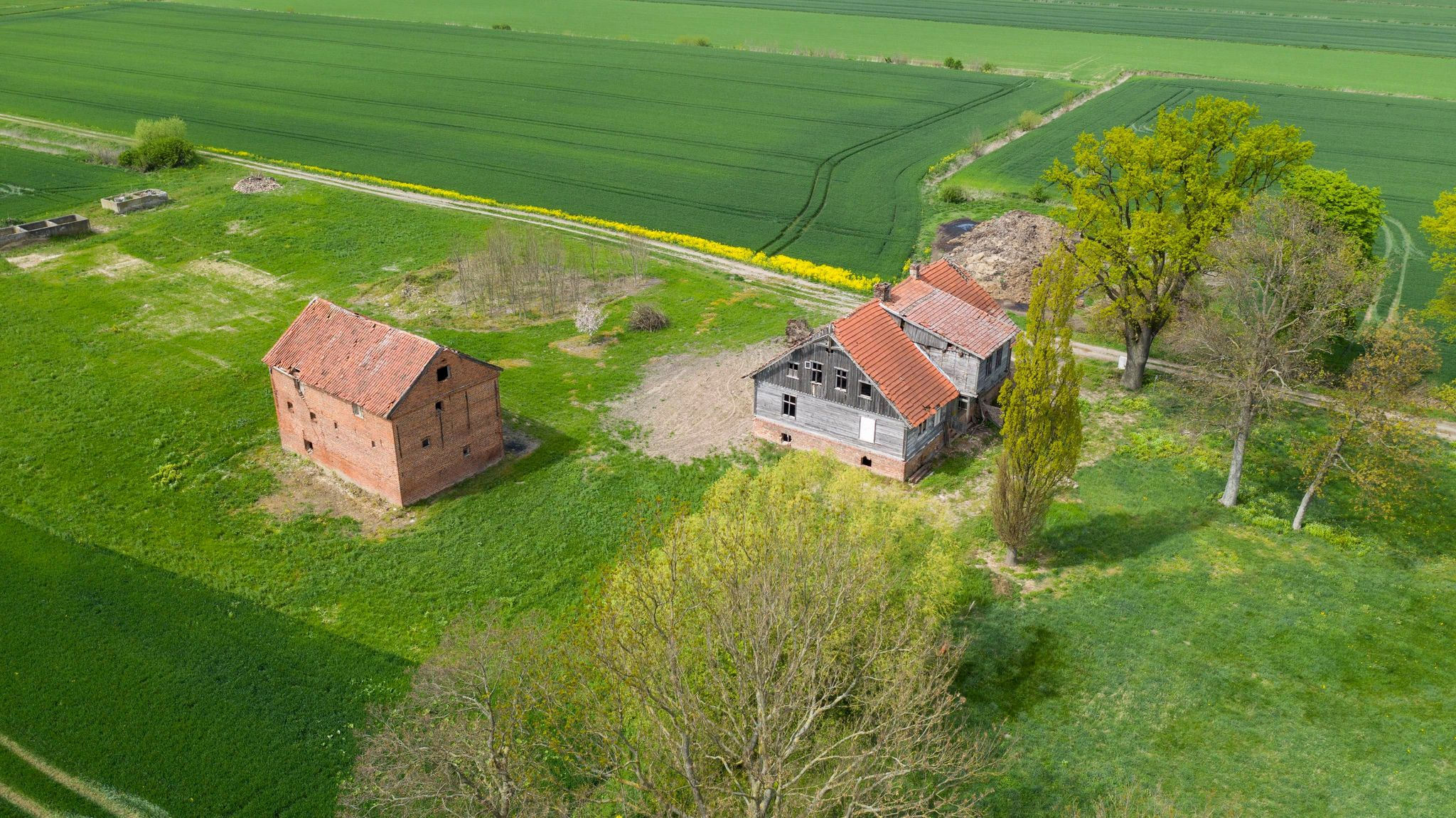
- Old farm in Małe Walichnowy

- Location within Poland
- Coordinates: 53°56′16″N 18°50′38″E
- Country: Poland
- Voivodeship: Pomeranian
- County: Tczew
- Gmina: Pelplin
- Population: 415
- Time zone: UTC+1 (CET)
  - Summer (DST): UTC+2 (CEST)
- Vehicle registration: GTC

Małe Walichnowy [ˈmawɛ valixˈnɔvɨ] is a village in the administrative district of Gmina Pelplin, within Tczew County, Pomeranian Voivodeship, in northern Poland. It is located in the ethnocultural region of Kociewie in the historic region of Pomerania.

== History ==
During the German occupation of Poland (World War II), Małe Walichnowy was one of the sites of executions of Poles, carried out by the Germans in 1939 as part of the Intelligenzaktion. Local teachers were murdered by the occupiers during large massacres of Poles carried out in 1939 in the Forest of Szpęgawsk, also as part of the Intelligenzaktion.
