= Rudno, Pomeranian Voivodeship =

Village in Pomeranian Voivodeship, Poland

Rudno
- Village
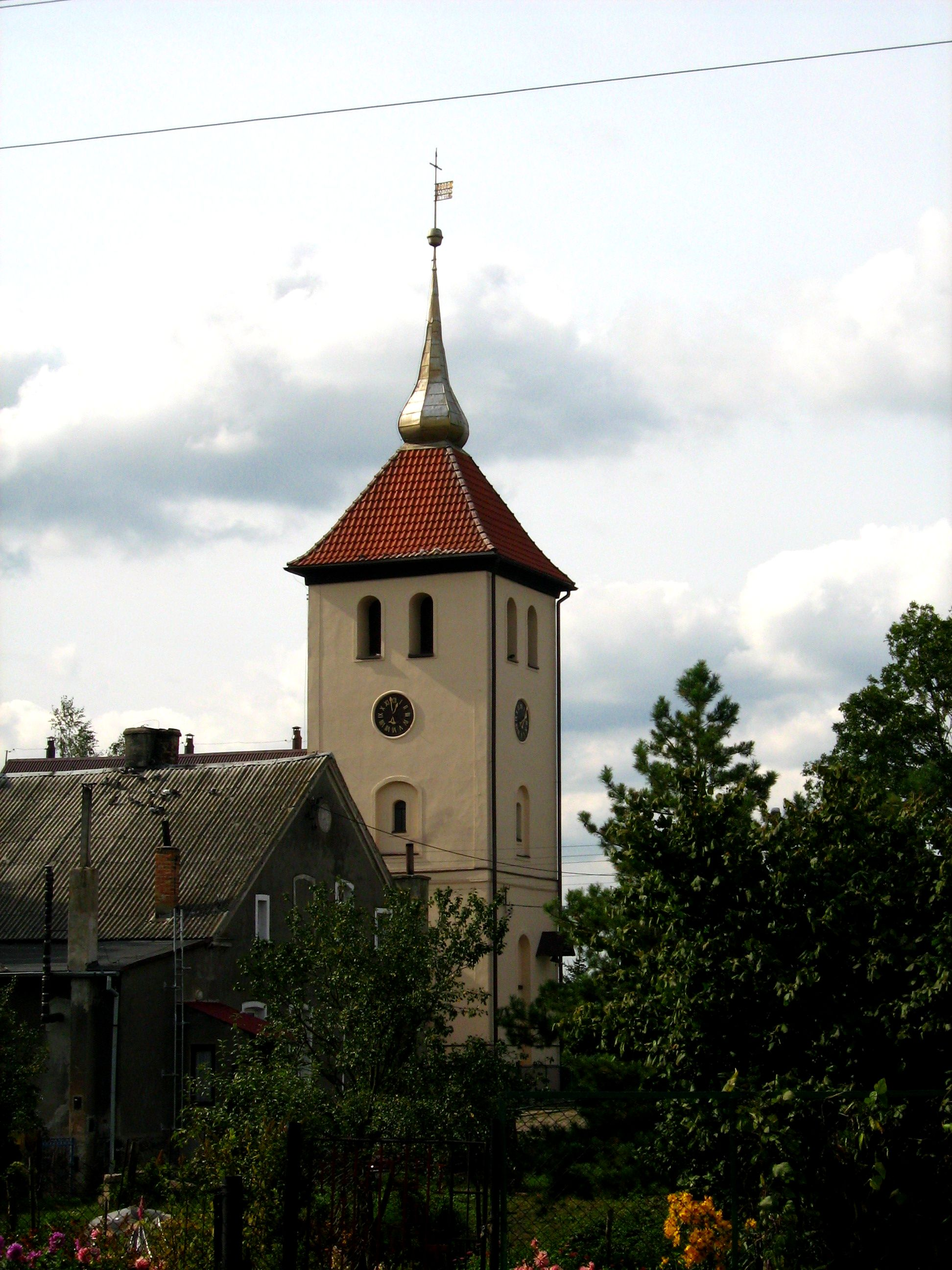
- Exaltation of the Holy Cross church in Rudno

- Location within Poland
- Coordinates: 53°56′10″N 18°45′35″E
- Country: Poland
- Voivodeship: Pomeranian
- County: Tczew
- Gmina: Pelplin

Population
  - Total: 935
- Time zone: UTC+1 (CET)
  - Summer (DST): UTC+2 (CEST)
- Vehicle registration: GTC

Rudno [ˈrudnɔ] is a village in the administrative district of Gmina Pelplin, within Tczew County, Pomeranian Voivodeship, in northern Poland. It is located within the ethnocultural region of Kociewie in the historic region of Pomerania.

== History ==
Rudno was a royal village of the Polish Crown, administratively located in the Tczew County in the Pomeranian Voivodeship.

During the occupation of Poland (World War II), in 1939, the Germans murdered the local Polish teacher and his wife along with several Poles from other villages in the Szpęgawski Forest (see Intelligenzaktion Pommern).
