= Nowy Dwór, Tczew County =

Village in Pomeranian Voivodeship, Poland

Nowy Dwór
- Village
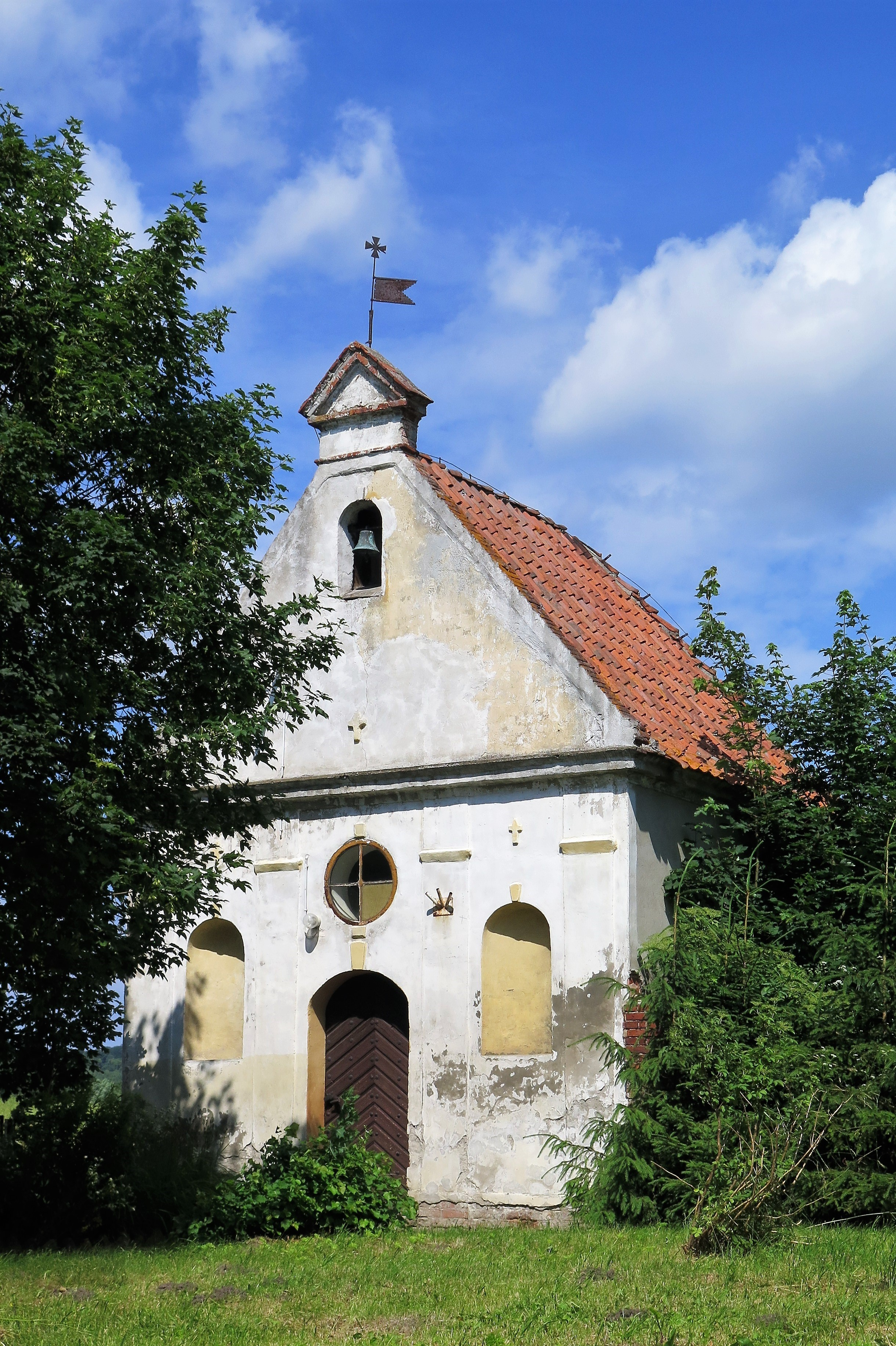
- A 17th century Cistercian chapel in the village, 2020

- Location within Poland
- Coordinates: 53°56′30″N 18°39′10″E
- Country: Poland
- Voivodeship: Pomeranian
- County: Tczew
- Gmina: Pelplin
- Population: 153
- Time zone: UTC+1 (CET)
  - Summer (DST): UTC+2 (CEST)
- Vehicle registration: GTC

Nowy Dwór [ˈnɔvɨ ˈdvur] is a village in the administrative district of Gmina Pelplin, within Tczew County, Pomeranian Voivodeship, in northern Poland. It is located within the ethnocultural region of Kociewie in the historic region of Pomerania.

Nowy Dwór was a private church village of the monastery in Pelplin, administratively located in the Tczew County in the Pomeranian Voivodeship of the Kingdom of Poland.

== Transport ==
The Polish A1 motorway runs nearby, west of the village.
