= Gaj, Pomeranian Voivodeship =

Village in Pomeranian Voivodeship, Poland

Gaj
- Settlement
- Location within Poland
- Coordinates: 53°54′45″N 18°43′58″E
- Country: Poland
- Voivodeship: Pomeranian
- County: Tczew
- Gmina: Pelplin
- Time zone: UTC+1 (CET)
  - Summer (DST): UTC+2 (CEST)
- Vehicle registration: GTC

Gaj [ɡai̯] is a settlement in the administrative district of Gmina Pelplin, within Tczew County, Pomeranian Voivodeship, in northern Poland. It is located in the ethnocultral region of Kociewie in the historic region of Pomerania.
