= Korytyba, Tczew County =

Settlement in Pomeranian Voivodeship, Poland

Korytyba
- Hamlet
- Location within Poland
- Coordinates: 53°57′57″N 18°41′17″E
- Country: Poland
- Voivodeship: Pomeranian
- County: Tczew
- Gmina: Pelplin
- Time zone: UTC+1 (CET)
  - Summer (DST): UTC+2 (CEST)
- Postal code: 83-130
- SIMC: 0168900
- Vehicle registration: GST

Korytyba is a hamlet in the administrative district of Gmina Pelplin, within Tczew County, Pomeranian Voivodeship, in northern Poland. It is located within the ethnocultural region of Kociewie.

== History ==
The settlement was formed in the mid to late nineteenth century as a result of socio-economic changes impacting the local population. Firstly, the land that Korytyba is sited on was former common land that was transferred to private ownership during the Prussian Reform Movement, which facilitated the foundation of the settlement. Secondly, local population dispersal occurred as a reaction to wider population disturbance due patterns of mass emigration to the Empire of Brazil and other parts of the German Empire.
