= Wybudowanie, Gmina Pelplin =

Village in Pomeranian Voivodeship, Poland

Wybudowanie
- Village
- Location within Poland
- Coordinates: 53°54′55″N 18°42′28″E
- Country: Poland
- Voivodeship: Pomeranian
- County: Tczew
- Gmina: Pelplin
- Time zone: UTC+1 (CET)
  - Summer (DST): UTC+2 (CEST)
- Vehicle registration: GTC

Wybudowanie [ˈvɨbudɔˈvaɲɛ] is a village in the administrative district of Gmina Pelplin, within Tczew County, Pomeranian Voivodeship, in northern Poland. It is located in the ethnocultural region of Kociewie in the historical region of Pomerania.
