= Lignowy Szlacheckie =

Village in Pomeranian Voivodeship, Poland

- Village
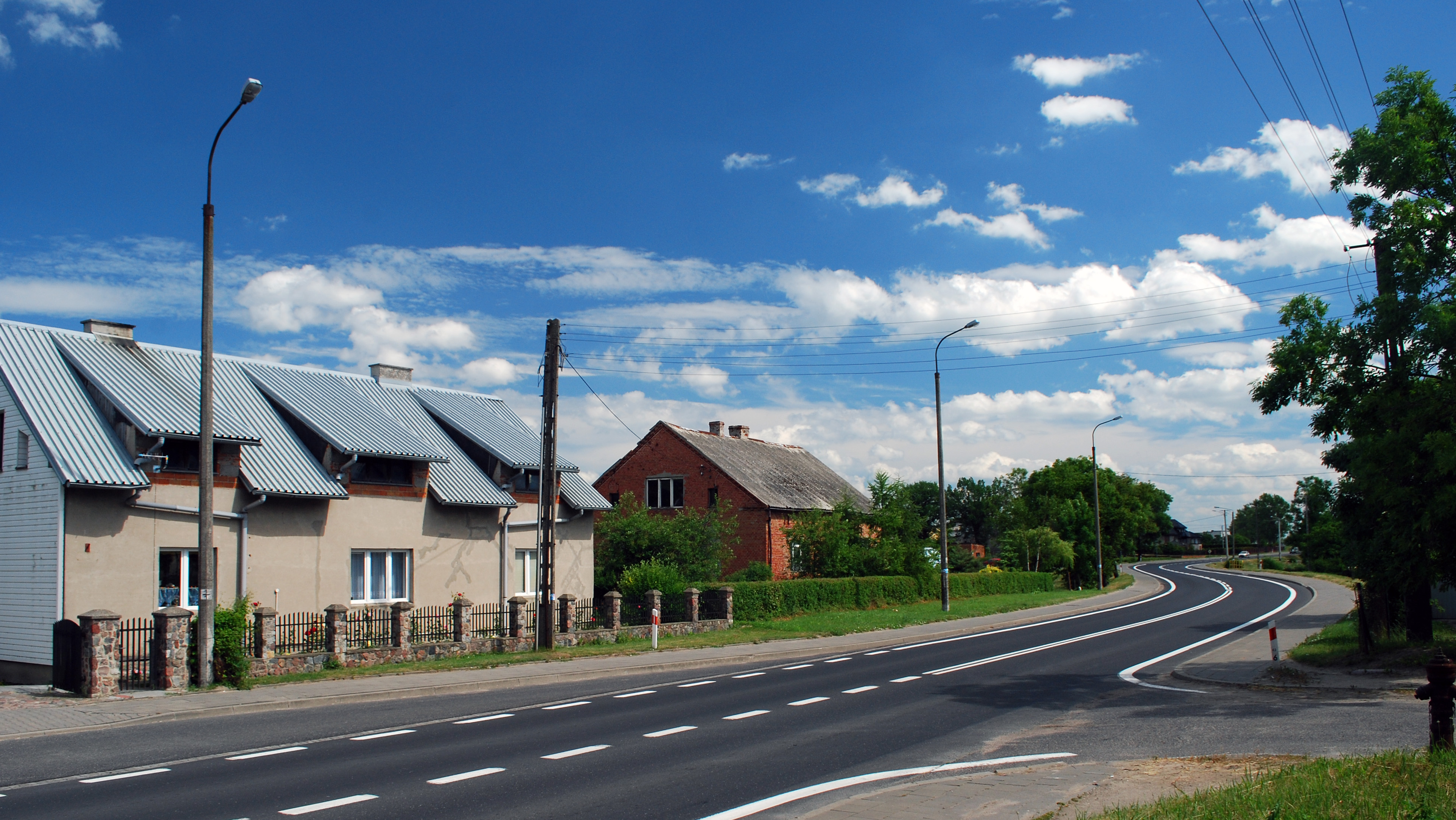
- Main thoroughfare

- Location within Poland
- Coordinates: 53°54′16″N 18°46′55″E
- Country: Poland
- Voivodeship: Pomeranian
- County: Tczew
- Gmina: Pelplin

Population
  - Total: 705
- Time zone: UTC+1 (CET)
  - Summer (DST): UTC+2 (CEST)
- Vehicle registration: GTC

Lignowy Szlacheckie [liɡˈnɔvɨ ʂlaˈxɛt͡skʲɛ] is a village in the administrative district of Gmina Pelplin, within Tczew County, Pomeranian Voivodeship, in northern Poland. It is located within the ethnocultural region of Kociewie in the historic region of Pomerania.

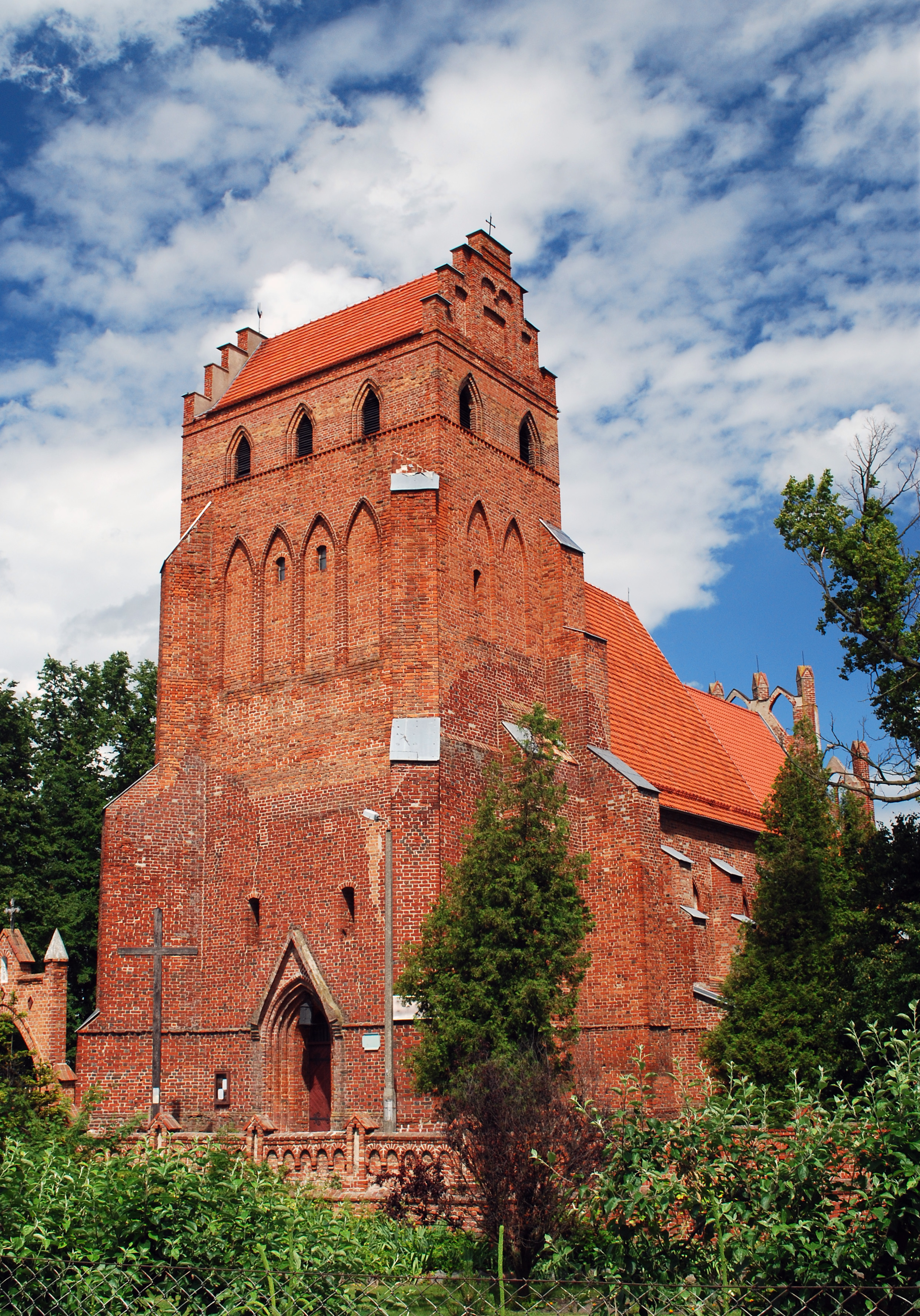
Gothic church in Lignowy. Front elevation.

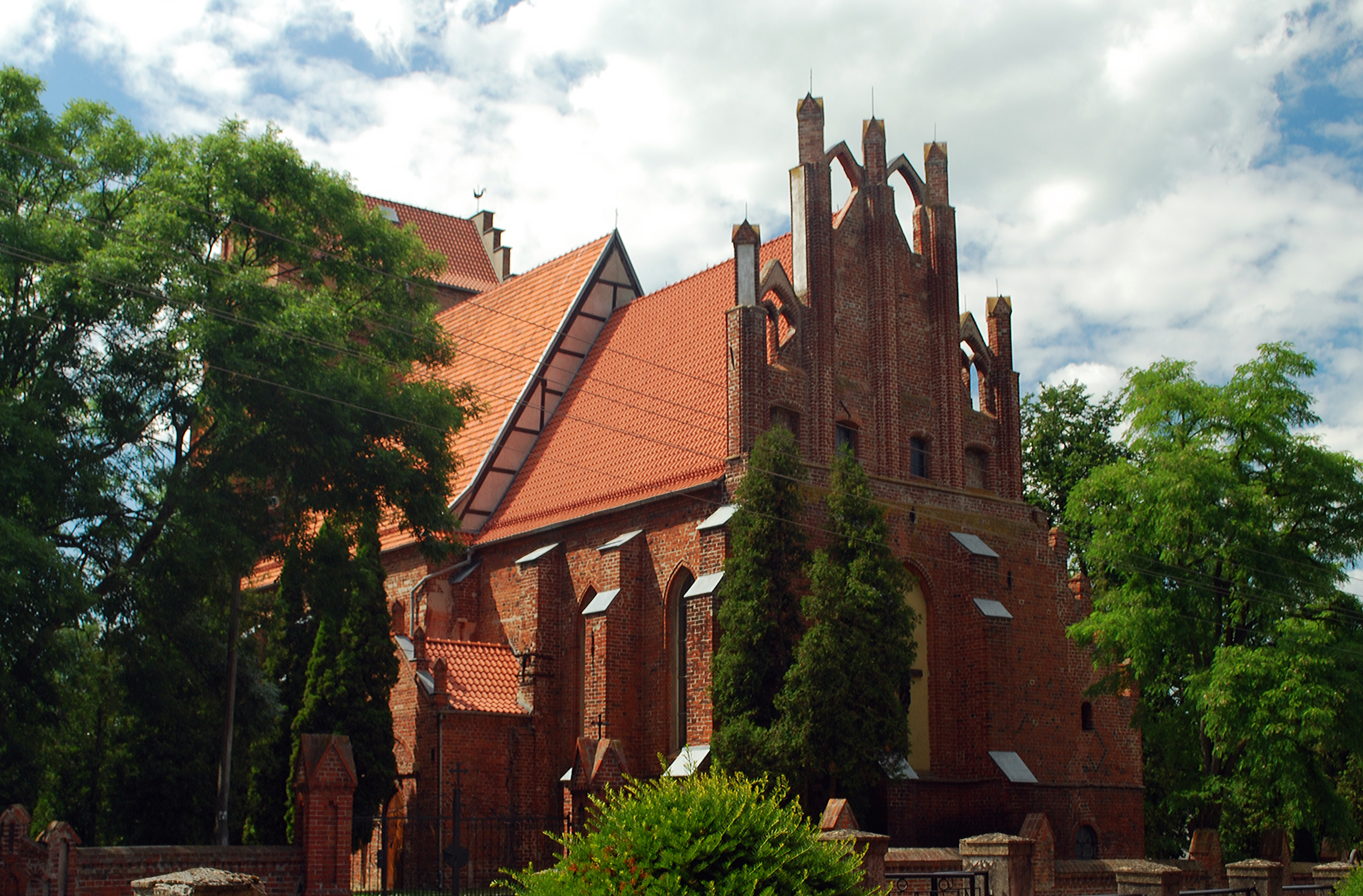
Saint Martin Church, back view.
