= Raicu =

- Language: Romanian

Origin
- Meaning: "Heavenly", or derivative of "Radu"
- Region of origin: Romania

Raicu is a Romanian-language of Serbian or Bulgarian origin, related to Rajko; as reported by linguist Alexandru Graur, it is widely assumed to be derived from rai ("heaven", hence "heavenly"), but is more likely a derivative of the given name "Radu". It is also occasionally present as a given name, as with the literary and social critic Raicu Ionescu-Rion (1872–1895).

== People with the surname ==
- Alexandru Raicu (born 1996), judoka
- Andreea Raicu (born 1977), model and television host
- Lucian Raicu (pen name of Bernard Leibovici; 1934–2006), literary critic
- Mihai Raicu (fl. 1928), fencer
