= Wielki Garc =

Village in Pomeranian Voivodeship, Poland

- Village
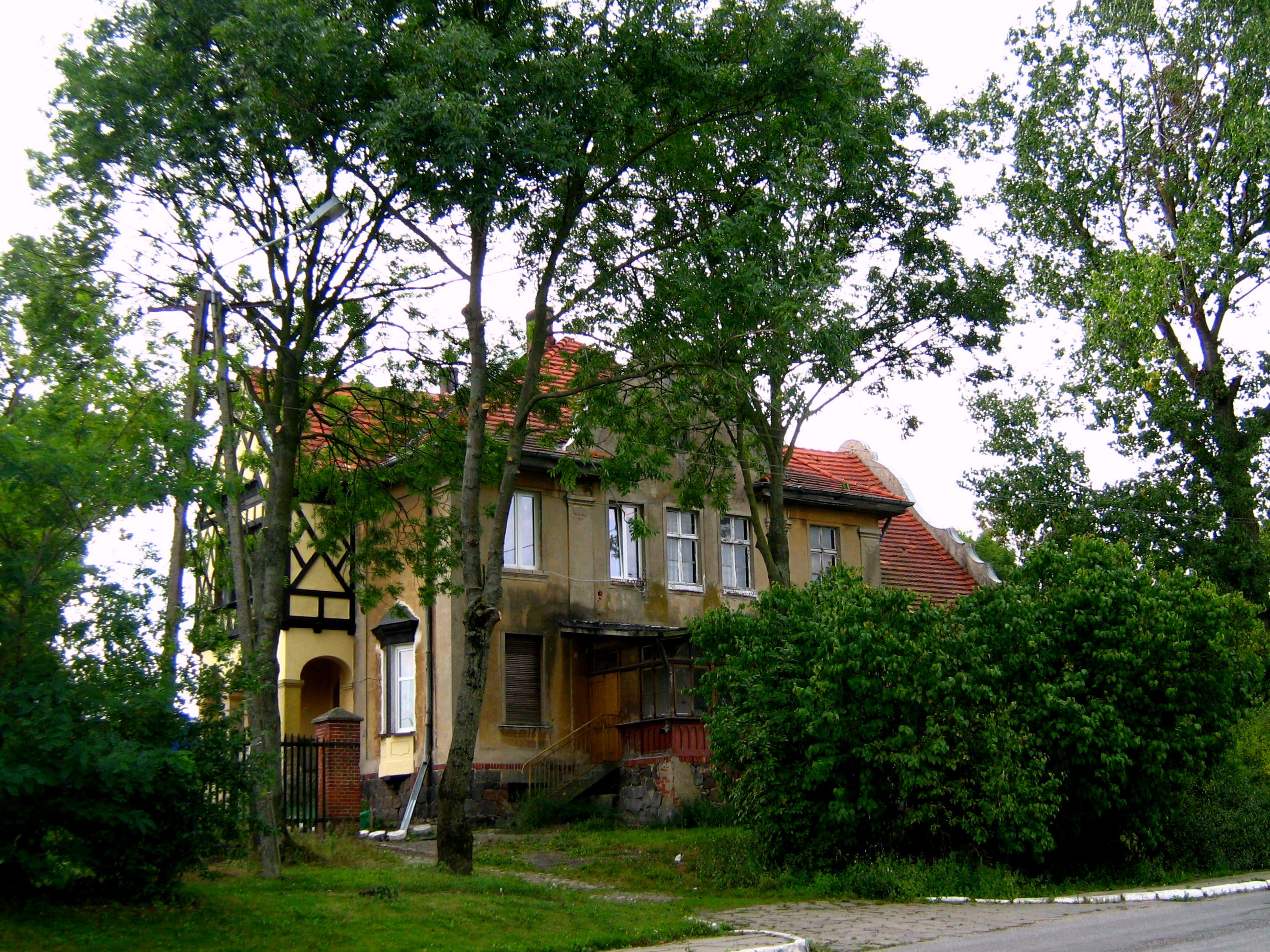
- A Neo Baroque residence in the village

- Location within Poland
- Coordinates: 53°56′49″N 18°46′44″E
- Country: Poland
- Voivodeship: Pomeranian
- County: Tczew
- Gmina: Pelplin
- Population: 293 (2,011)
- Time zone: UTC+1 (CET)
  - Summer (DST): UTC+2 (CEST)
- Vehicle registration: GTC

Wielki Garc (Polish pronunciation: [ˈvjɛlkʲi ˈɡarts]) is a village in the administrative district of Gmina Pelplin, within Tczew County, Pomeranian Voivodeship, in northern Poland. It is located in the ethnocultural region of Kociewie in the historical region of Pomerania.

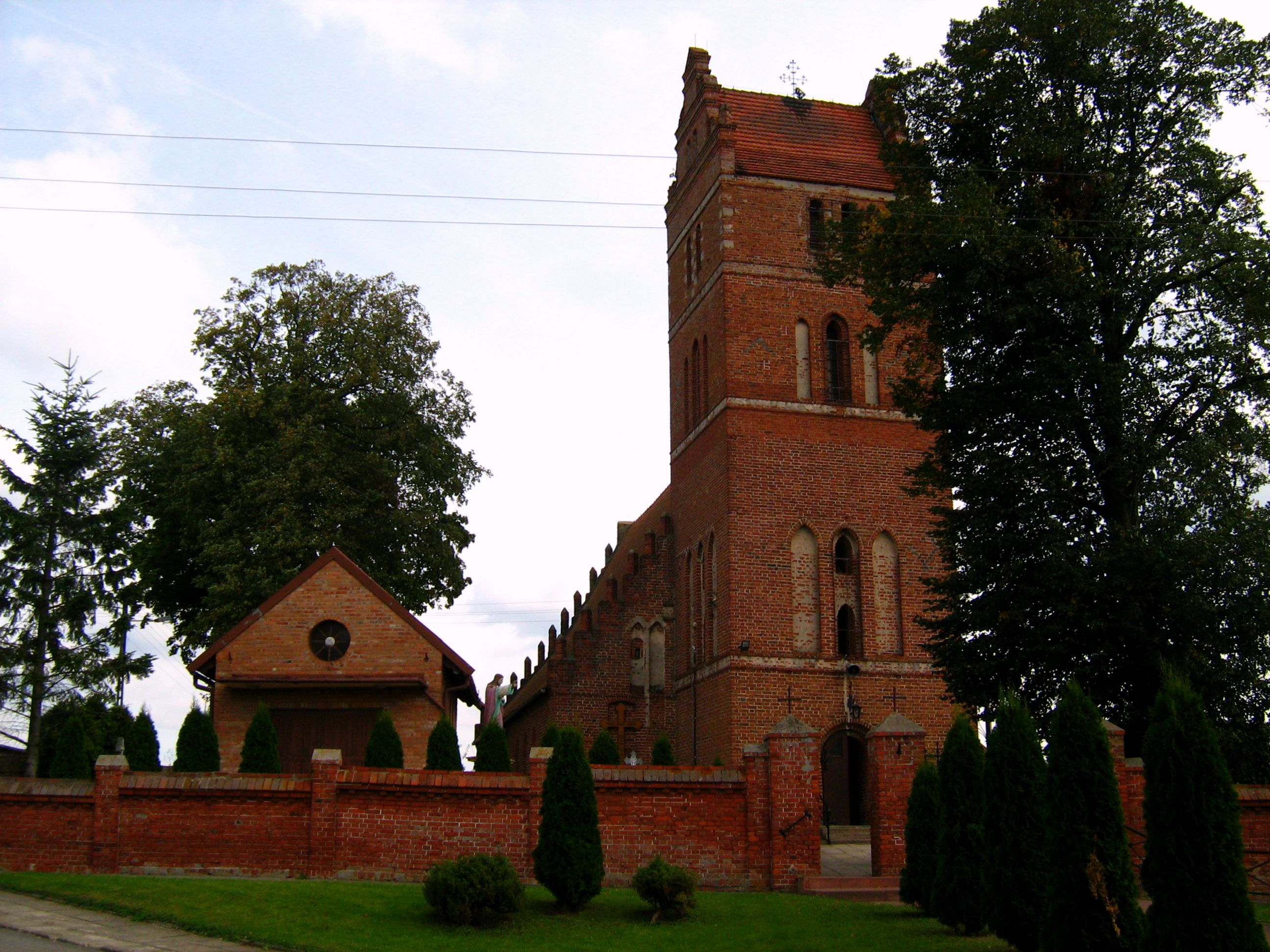
Church of Immaculate Conception
