= Ropuchy =

Village in Pomeranian Voivodeship, Poland

- Village
- Location within Poland
- Coordinates: 53°55′40″N 18°38′14″E
- Country: Poland
- Voivodeship: Pomeranian
- County: Tczew
- Gmina: Pelplin
- Population: 118
- Time zone: UTC+1 (CET)
  - Summer (DST): UTC+2 (CEST)
- Vehicle registration: GTC

Ropuchy [rɔˈpuxɨ] is a village in the administrative district of Gmina Pelplin, within Tczew County, Pomeranian Voivodeship, in northern Poland. The village is located within the ethnocultural region of Kociewie in the historic region of Pomerania.

Ropuchy was a private church village of the monastery in Pelplin, administratively part of Tczew County in the Pomeranian Voivodeship of the Kingdom of Poland.

== Transport ==
The Polish A1 motorway and the Voivodeship road 229 run through the village.
