= Pomyje =

Village in Pomeranian Voivodeship, Poland

- Village
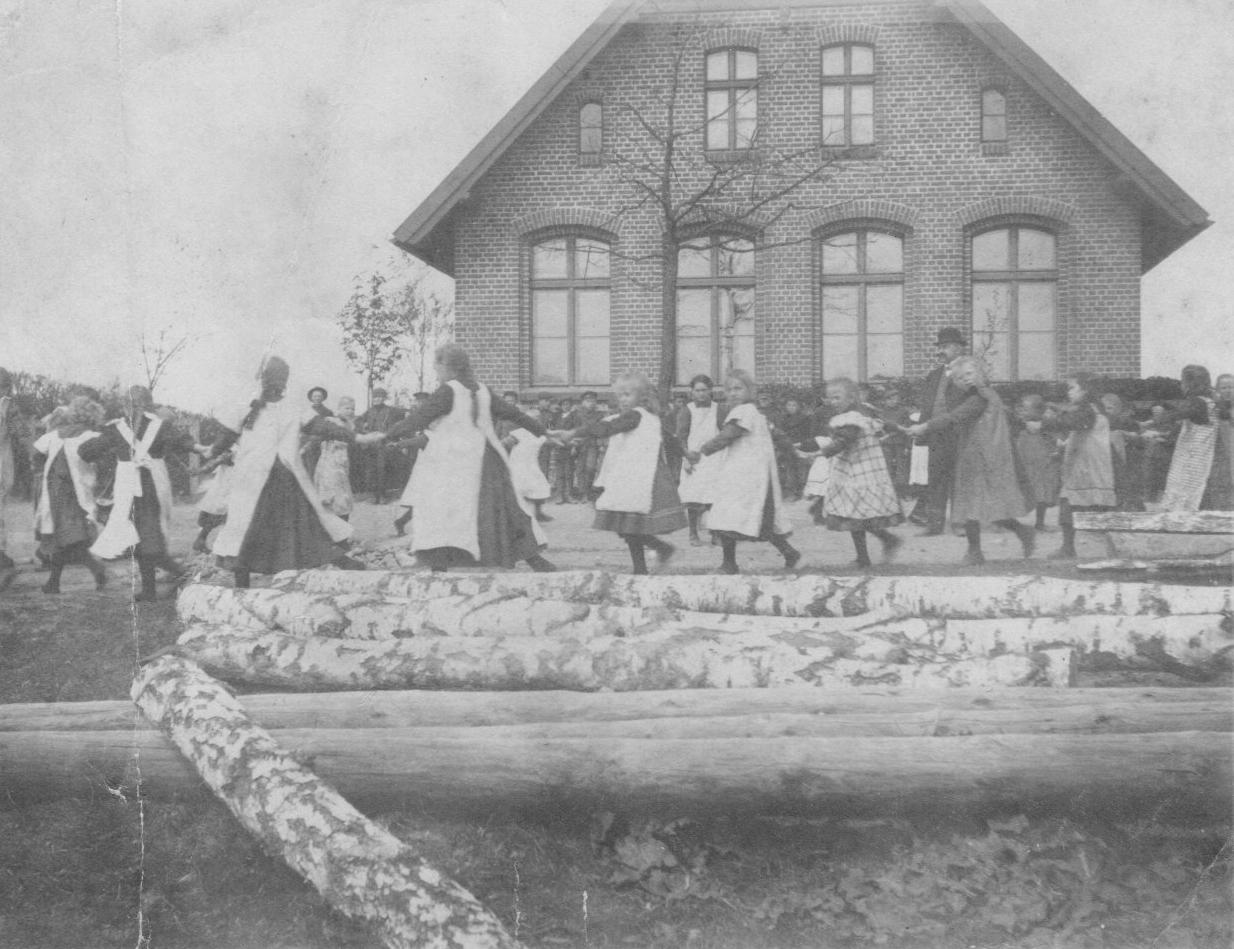
- Children at a primary school in Pomyje play Kółko graniaste, 1912

- Location within Poland
- Coordinates: 53°54′27″N 18°44′52″E
- Country: Poland
- Voivodeship: Pomeranian
- County: Tczew
- Gmina: Pelplin
- Population: 162
- Time zone: UTC+1 (CET)
  - Summer (DST): UTC+2 (CEST)
- Vehicle registration: GTC

Pomyje [pɔˈmɨjɛ] is a village in the administrative district of Gmina Pelplin, within Tczew County, Pomeranian Voivodeship, in northern Poland. It is located within the ethnocultural region of Kociewie in the historic region of Pomerania.

Pomyje was a private church village of the monastery in Pelplin, administratively located in the Tczew County in the Pomeranian Voivodeship of the Polish Crown.
