= Janowo, Tczew County =

Village in Pomeranian Voivodeship, Poland

Janowo
- Settlement
- Location within Poland
- Coordinates: 53°53′41″N 18°40′35″E
- Country: Poland
- Voivodeship: Pomeranian
- County: Tczew
- Gmina: Pelplin
- Time zone: UTC+1 (CET)
  - Summer (DST): UTC+2 (CEST)
- Vehicle registration: GTC

Janowo [jaˈnɔvɔ] is a settlement in the administrative district of Gmina Pelplin, within Tczew County, Pomeranian Voivodeship, in northern Poland. It is located within the ethnocultural region of Kociewie in the historic region of Pomerania.
