= Pustki, Tczew County =

Village in Pomeranian Voivodeship, Poland

Pustki
- Settlement
- Location within Poland
- Coordinates: 53°52′47″N 18°44′7″E
- Country: Poland
- Voivodeship: Pomeranian
- County: Tczew
- Gmina: Pelplin
- Time zone: UTC+1 (CET)
  - Summer (DST): UTC+2 (CEST)
- Vehicle registration: GTC

Pustki [ˈpustki] is a settlement in the administrative district of Gmina Pelplin, within Tczew County, Pomeranian Voivodeship, in northern Poland. It is located in the ethnocultural region of Kociewie in the historic region of Pomerania.
