= Rajović =

Rajović (Serbian: Рајовић, r̩ajɔˈʋitɕ) is a Serbian and Montenegrin surname that may refer to:

- Andrija Rajović, Danish footballer of Montenegrin descent
- Blažo Rajović, Montenegrin footballer
- Boban Rajović, Montenegrin pop singer
- Marko Rajović, Montenegrin footballer
- Marko Rajović, Serbian footballer
- Mileta Rajović, Danish footballer of Montenegrin descent
- Milorad Rajović, Serbian footballer
- Sanja Rajović, Serbian female handballer
- Zoran Rajović, Serbian footballer
