= Rajkowy =

Village in Pomeranian Voivodeship, Poland

- Village
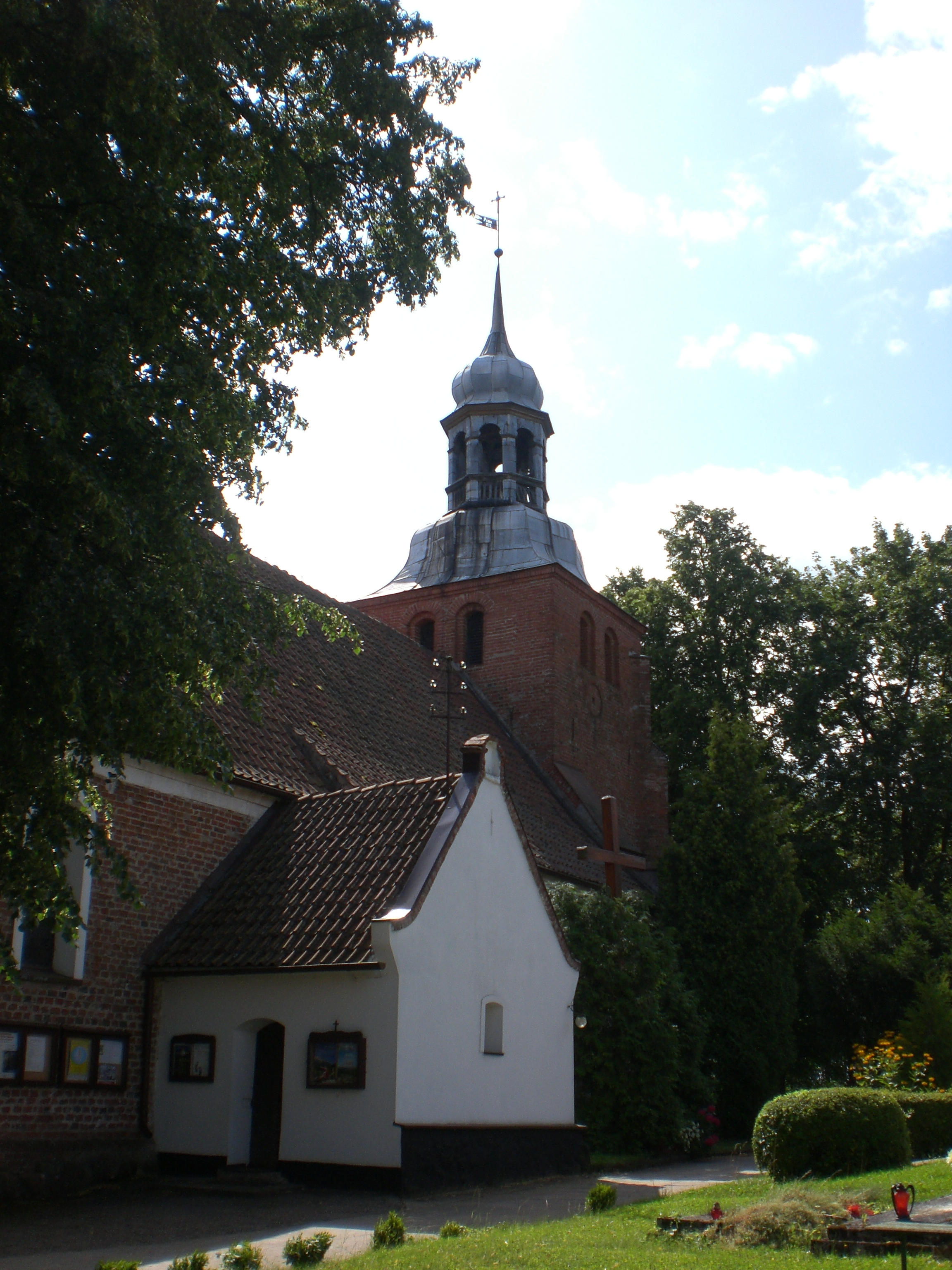
- Saint Bartholomew church in Rajkowy

- Location within Poland
- Coordinates: 53°57′51″N 18°42′35″E
- Country: Poland
- Voivodeship: Pomeranian
- County: Tczew
- Gmina: Pelplin

Population
  - Total: 1,677
- Time zone: UTC+1 (CET)
  - Summer (DST): UTC+2 (CEST)
- Vehicle registration: GTC

Rajkowy [rai̯ˈkɔvɨ] (historical names: Raicovo, Raycow, Raichowe, Reykow, Reichenek; Kashubian: Rôjkòwë; Raikau) is a village in the administrative district of Gmina Pelplin, within Tczew County, Pomeranian Voivodeship, in northern Poland. It is a historically significant village in the ethnocultural region of Kociewie in the historic region of Pomerania.

== History ==
Rajkowy finds its first mention in history in 1224 in the context of the donation of some of its lands to the Oliwa Abbey by Swietopelk II, Duke of Pomerania. The village was deeded in its entirety to the Abbey by Mestwin II in 1289. Rajkowy was a royal village of the Polish Crown, administratively located in the Tczew County in the Pomeranian Voivodeship.

During the German occupation of Poland (World War II), Rajkowy was one of the sites of executions of Poles, carried out by the Germans in 1939 as part of the Intelligenzaktion.

== Notable people ==
- Kazimierz Piechowski (1919–2017), Polish engineer and soldier of the Home Army, escapee from Auschwitz
