= Rajkovac =

Rajkovac (Cyrillic script: Рајковац) may refer to:

- Rajkovac (Mladenovac), a village in municipality of Mladenovac, Serbia
- Rajkovac (Topola), a village in municipality of Topola, Serbia
