= Nadleśnictwo, Pomeranian Voivodeship =

Settlement in Kociewie

Nadleśnictwo
- Hamlet
- Location within Poland
- Coordinates: 53°55′38″N 18°39′51″E
- Country: Poland
- Voivodeship: Pomeranian
- County: Tczew
- Gmina: Pelplin

Population
  - Total: 236
- Time zone: UTC+1 (CET)
  - Summer (DST): UTC+2 (CEST)
- Postal code: 83-130
- SIMC: 0169006
- Vehicle registration: GTC

Nadleśnictwo ([nadlɛɕˈnit͡stfɔ]; formerly: Pelplin-Nadleśnictwo) is a hamlet in the administrative district of Gmina Pelplin, within Tczew County, Pomeranian Voivodeship, in northern Poland. It is located within the ethnocultural region of Kociewie in the historic region of Pomerania.

== History ==
From the late thirteenth to the early nineteenth century, the area of the hamlet was forestry land owned by the Cistercians. Following the First Partition, Pelplin Abbey was dissolved and its lands began to be settled, with the settlement of Nadleśnictwo established in 1848. In 1939, the name of the hamlet was officially changed to Pelplin Oberförsterei.
