= Nowy Międzyłęż =

Village in Pomeranian Voivodeship, Poland

- Village
- Location within Poland
- Coordinates: 53°56′36″N 18°49′43″E
- Country: Poland
- Voivodeship: Pomeranian
- County: Tczew
- Gmina: Pelplin
- Time zone: UTC+1 (CET)
  - Summer (DST): UTC+2 (CEST)
- Vehicle registration: GTC

Nowy Międzyłęż [ˈnɔvɨ mjɛnˈd͡zɨwɛ̃ʂ] is a village in the administrative district of Gmina Pelplin, within Tczew County, Pomeranian Voivodeship, in northern Poland. It is located within the ethnocultural region of Kociewie in the historic region of Pomerania.
