= Rajković, Mionica =

Rajković Рајковић
- Village (Selo)
- Location within Serbia
- Coordinates: 44°13′24″N 20°00′56″E
- Country: Serbia
- Region: Šumadija and Western Serbia
- District: Kolubara
- Municipality: Mionica
- Elevation: 1,070 ft (326 m)

Population (2011)
  - Total: 302
- Time zone: UTC+1 (CET)
  - Summer (DST): UTC+2 (CEST)

Rajković is a village in the municipality of Mionica, Serbia. According to the 2011 census, the village has a population of 302 inhabitants.

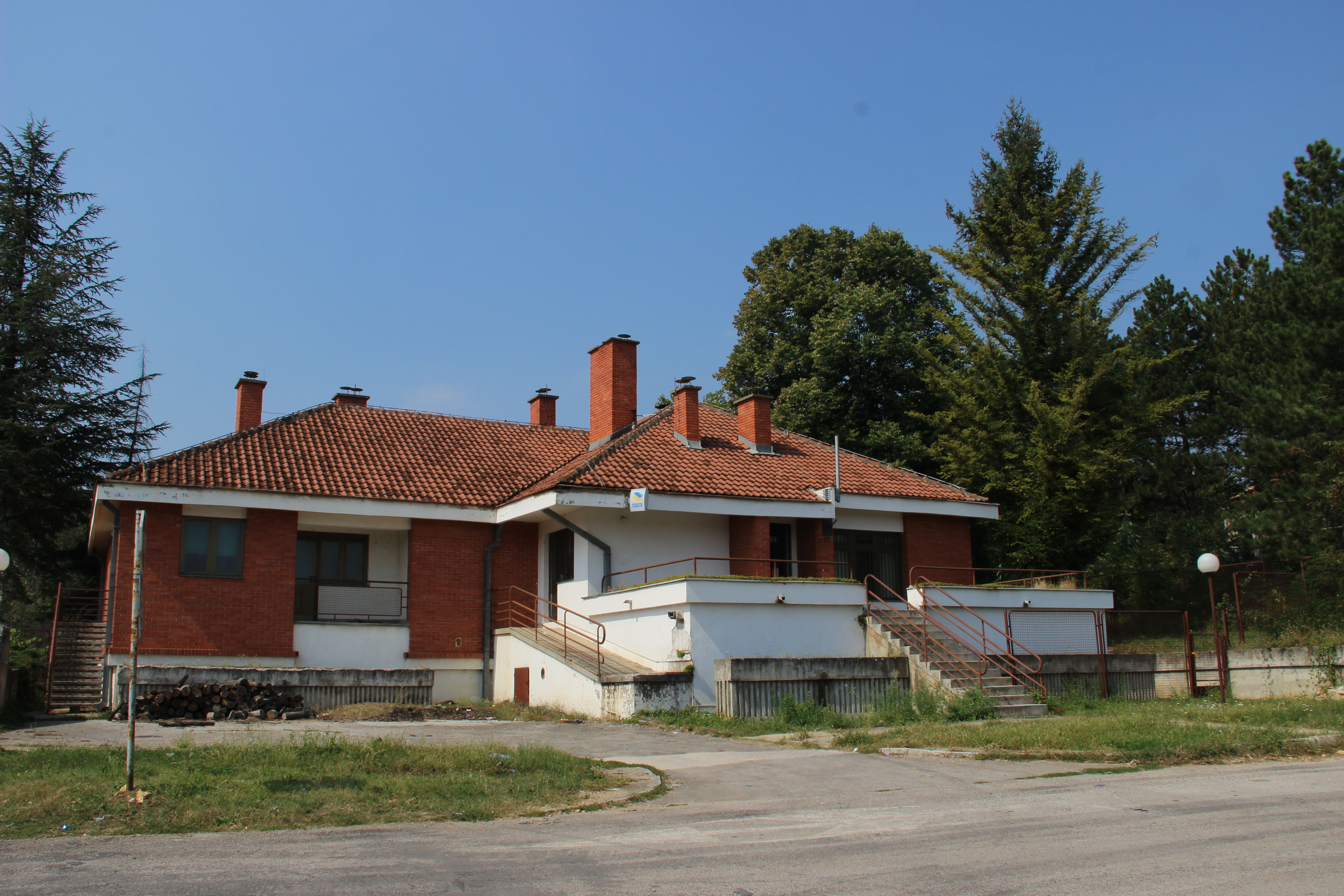
Rajkovic - panorama

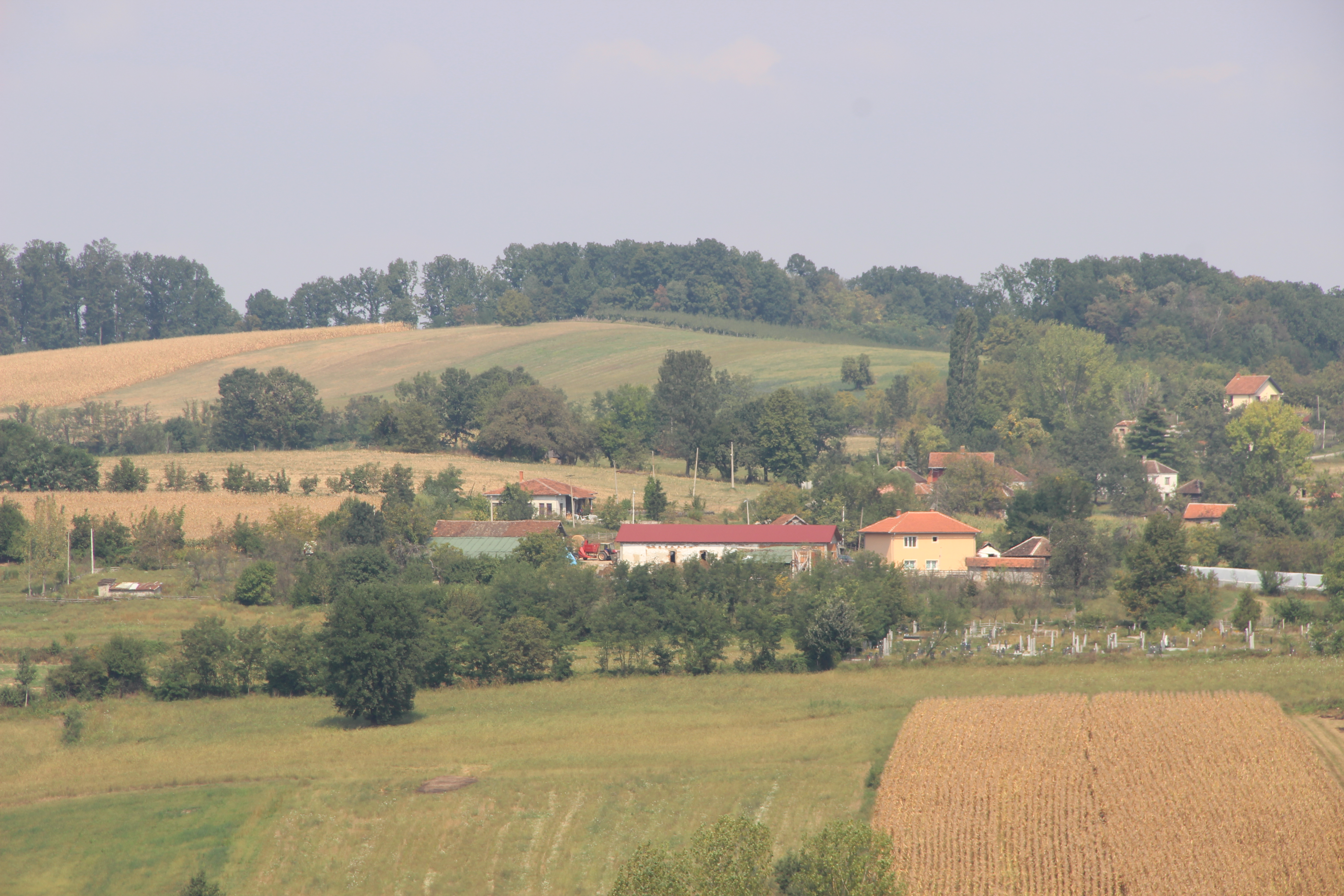
Rajkovic - panorama

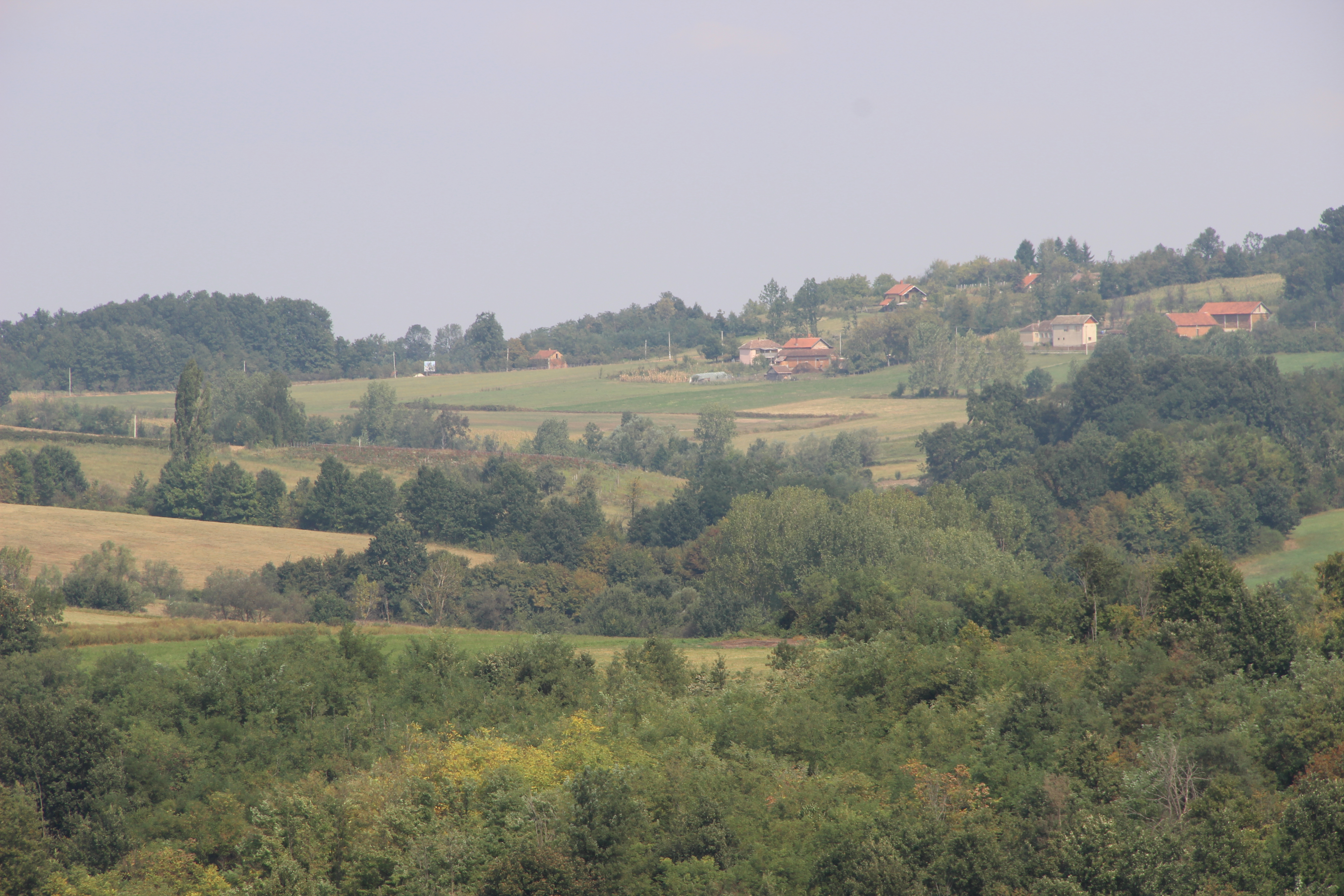
Rajkovic - panorama

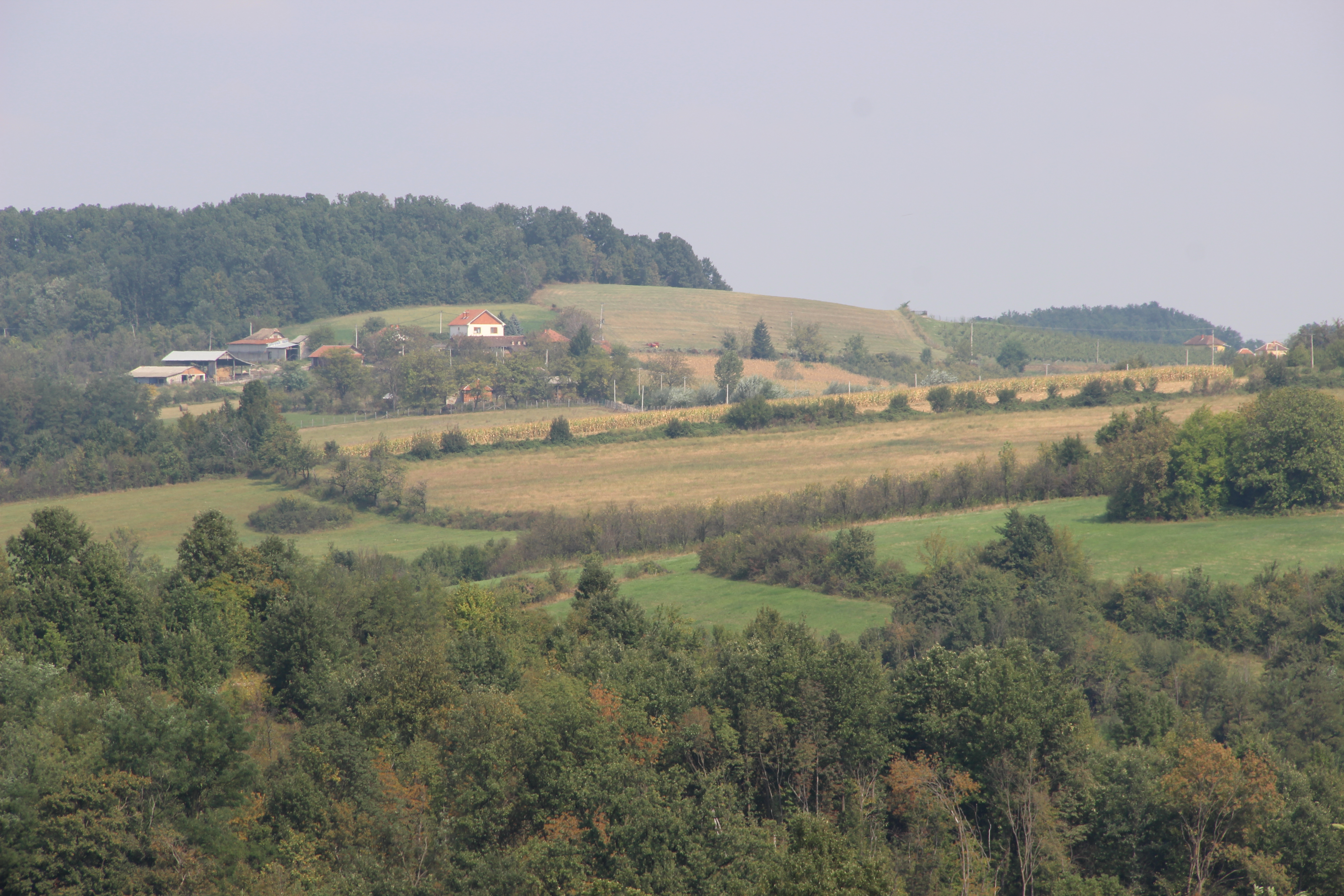
Rajkovic - panorama

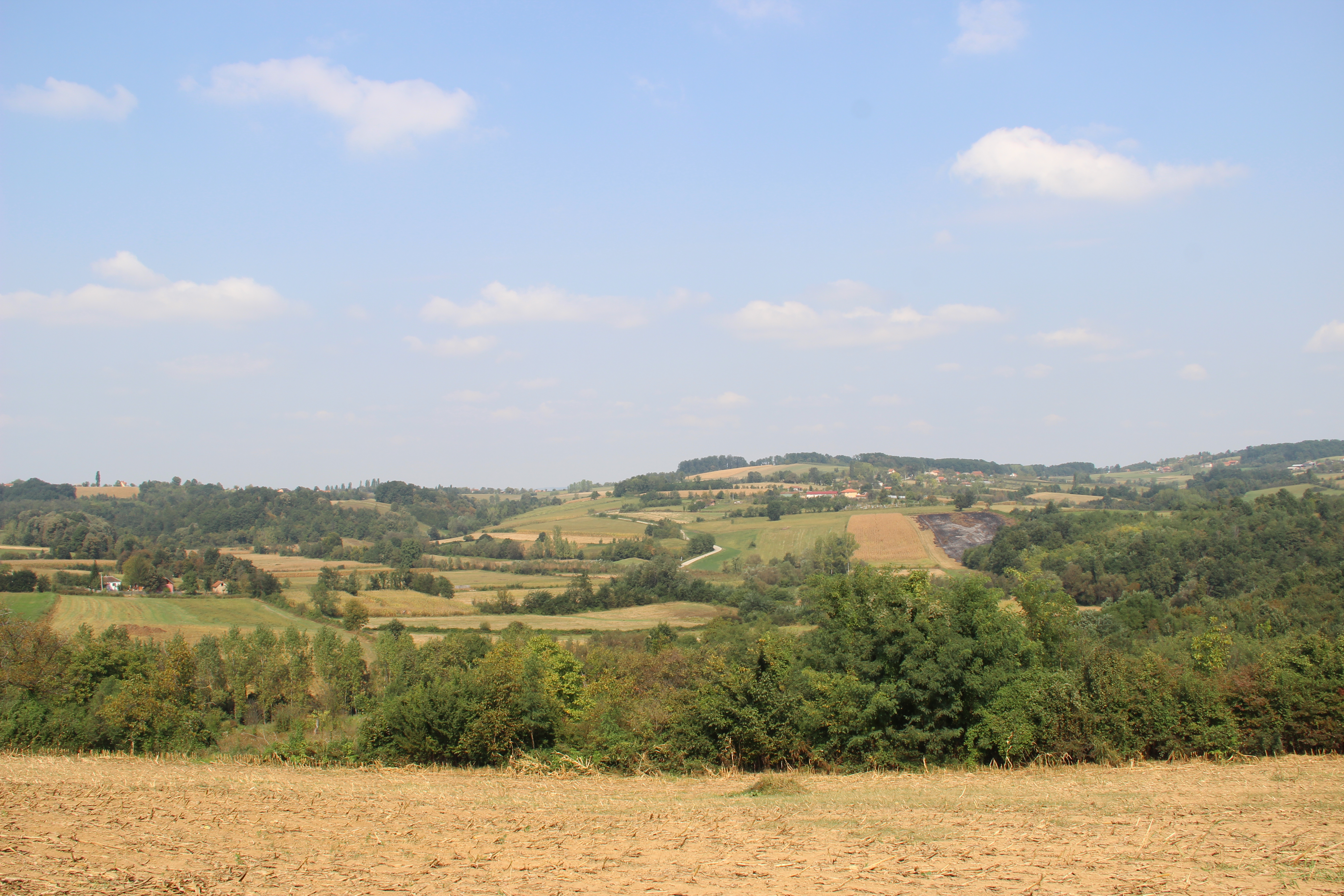
Rajkovic - panorama

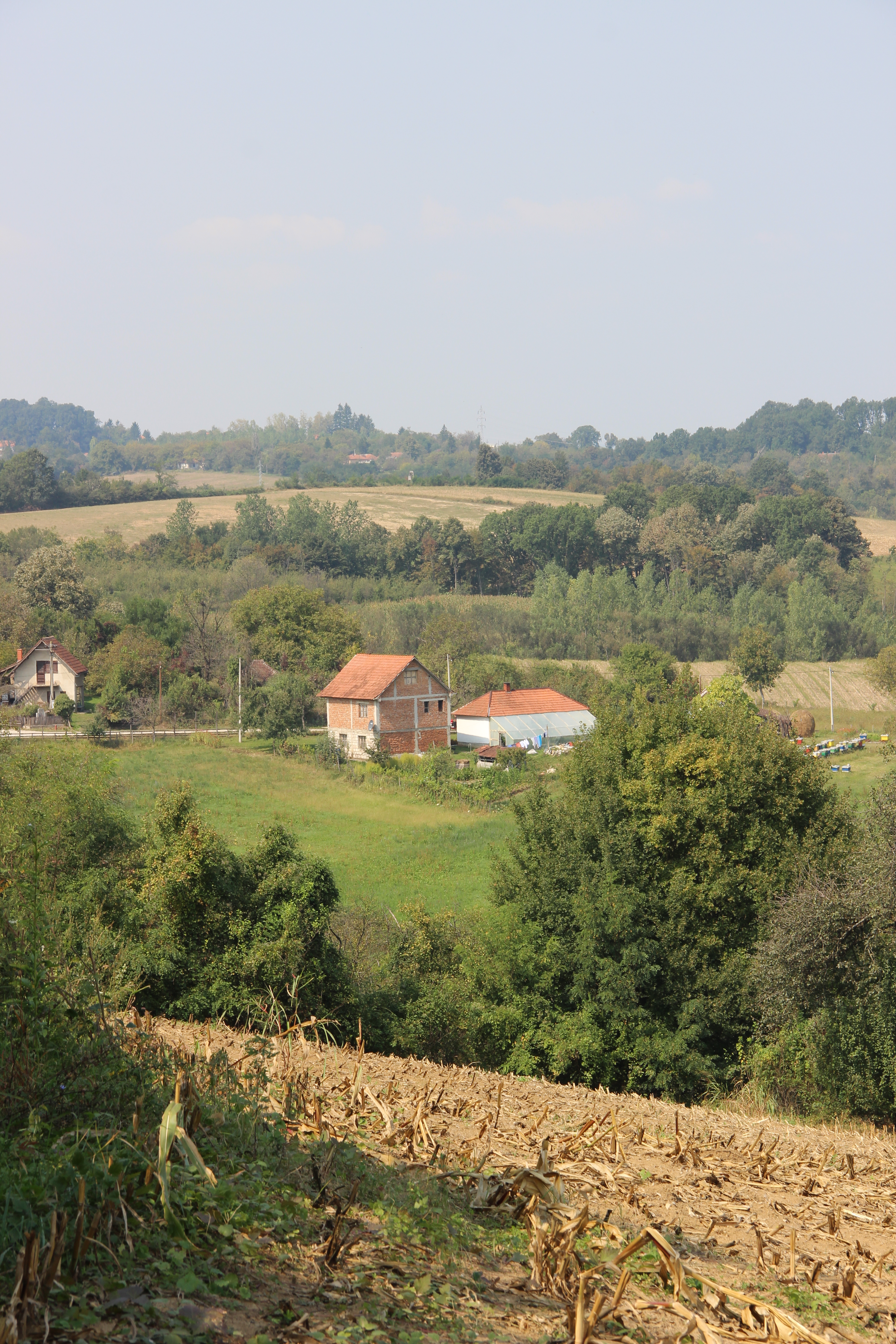
Rajkovic - panorama

== Population ==
Population of Rajković
1948	1953	1961	1971	1981	1991	2002	2011
747	735	694	599	508	429	350	302
