= Rajko Igić =

Serbian scientist and writer (born 1937)

- Born: 1937 (age 88–89); Despot St. Ivan, Kingdom of Yugoslavia
- Citizenship: American
- Writing career
- Notable work: Slavica alphabet

Rajko Igić (born 1937) is a Serbian doctor, scientist, and writer. He is best known for discovery of angiotensin I converting enzyme (ACE) in the retina, the anti-tobacco movement in Yugoslavia, and a variety of non-scientific texts. Igić is a member of the Academy of Sciences and Arts of Republic of Srpska.

== Early life and education ==
Igić was born in The Kingdom of Yugoslavia. He received his M.D. at the University of Belgrade and Ph.D. at the University of Sarajevo.

He was a founding university professor of pharmacology at the University of Tuzla (1978-1992), and the Director of the Department of Scientific, Cultural, and Educational International Exchange for the Republic of Bosnia and Herzegovina (1990-1992), at that time a constituent state of Yugoslavia.

His research career included stints in the United States and centered on the renin–angiotensin system. While at the University of Tuzla in the 1980s, Igić organized an early anti-smoking campaign aimed at the territories of former Yugoslavia.

An experimental alphabet called "Slavica", fusing Latin and Cyrillic, was devised by linguistic amateur Rajko Igić in 1986 and published in his 1987 book Nova slovarica in a quixotic attempt to mend the linguistic differences and ambiguities between the two alphabets, carefully avoiding graphemes that look alike and following the principle of "one sound, one letter" already accomplished by the Cyrillic alphabet.

He was, until retirement in 2007, a senior scientist in the Department of Anesthesiology and Pain Management at Cook County Hospital. Since then, Igić published several poetry books in English and Serbian.

== Work ==
=== Books ===
- Igić R. Osnovi farmakografije. Sarajevo, Svjetlost, 1978.
- Igić R. Nova Slovarica. Tuzla, Univerzal, 1987.
- Igić R. Osnovi gerijatrije. Sombor, Fondacija, 2019.

=== Notable scientific papers ===
- Igić R, Erdos EG, Yeh HS, Sorells K, Nakajima T. Angiotensin I converting enzyme of the lung. Circulation Research 1972;30-31:51-61.
- Igić R, Robinson CJG, Erdos EG. Angiotensin I converting enzyme in the choroid plexus and in the retina. Sixth International Congress of Pharmacology. Helsinki, 1975, Abstract 408.
- Igic R, Robinson CJG, Erdos EG. Angiotensin I converting enzyme activity in the choroid plexus and in the retina. In: Buckley JP, Ferrario CM, eds. Central actions of angiotensin and related hormones. New York: Pergamon Press, 1977; pp23-27.
- Igić R., Robinson CJG, Milošević Ž, Wilson C, Erdos EG. Activity of renin and angiotensin converting enzyme in retina and ciliary body. (In Serbo-Croatian). Liječnički Vjesnik 1977; 99:482-4.
- Igić R. Four decades of ocular renin-angiotensin and kallikrein-kinin systems (1977-2017). Experimental Eye Research 2018; 166:74-83.
