= Rajko Perušek =

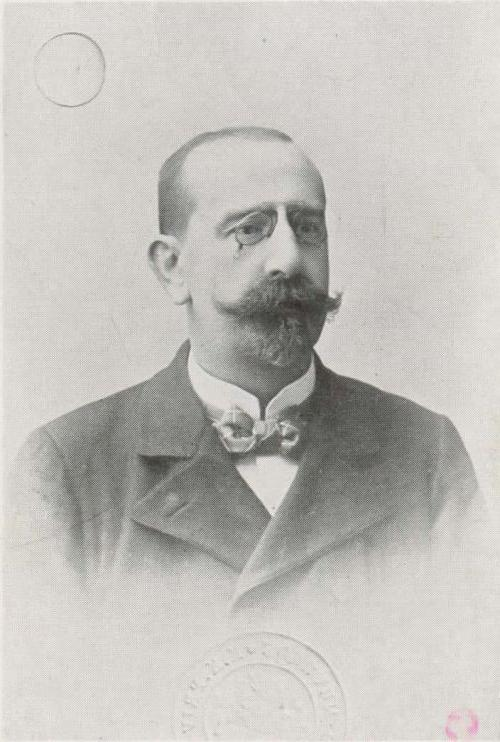
- Born: 7 January 1854; Ljubljana, Austrian Empire (now Slovenia)
- Died: 25 February 1917 (aged 63); Vienna, Austria-Hungary
- Occupations: Writer; translator; linguist; bibliographer

Rajko Perušek (7 January 1854 – 25 February 1917) was a Slovene writer, translator, linguist and bibliographer.

Perušek was born in Ljubljana, then part of the Austrian Empire, now the capital of Slovenia. He studied languages in Graz and graduated in 1879 with Ancient Greek and Latin as his main subjects. He worked in Pazin for a brief period before joining the Austro-Hungarian occupation of Bosnia. Between 1880 and 1882 he taught at the newly founded gymnasium in Sarajevo. His life in Bosnia was the inspiration for a number of his stories. From 1882 until 1890 he taught in Novo Mesto and then un Ljubljana until he retired in 1910.

Between 1895 and 1915 he was president of the Writers' Support Society (Slovene: Pisateljsko podporno društvo), the predecessor of today's Slovene Writers' Association.

He is also known for his translations into Slovene of Njegoš's Gorski vijenac and Sophocles's Oedipus at Colonus.
