= Stary Międzyłęż =

Village in Pomeranian Voivodeship, Poland

- Village
- Location within Poland
- Coordinates: 53°57′48″N 18°50′59″E
- Country: Poland
- Voivodeship: Pomeranian
- County: Tczew
- Gmina: Pelplin
- Time zone: UTC+1 (CET)
  - Summer (DST): UTC+2 (CEST)
- Vehicle registration: GTC

Stary Międzyłęż [ˈstarɨ mjɛnˈd͡zɨwɛ̃ʂ] is a village in the administrative district of Gmina Pelplin, within Tczew County, Pomeranian Voivodeship, in northern Poland. It is located in the ethnocultural region of Kociewie in the historic region of Pomerania.
