= Gręblin =

Village in Pomeranian Voivodeship, Poland

- Village
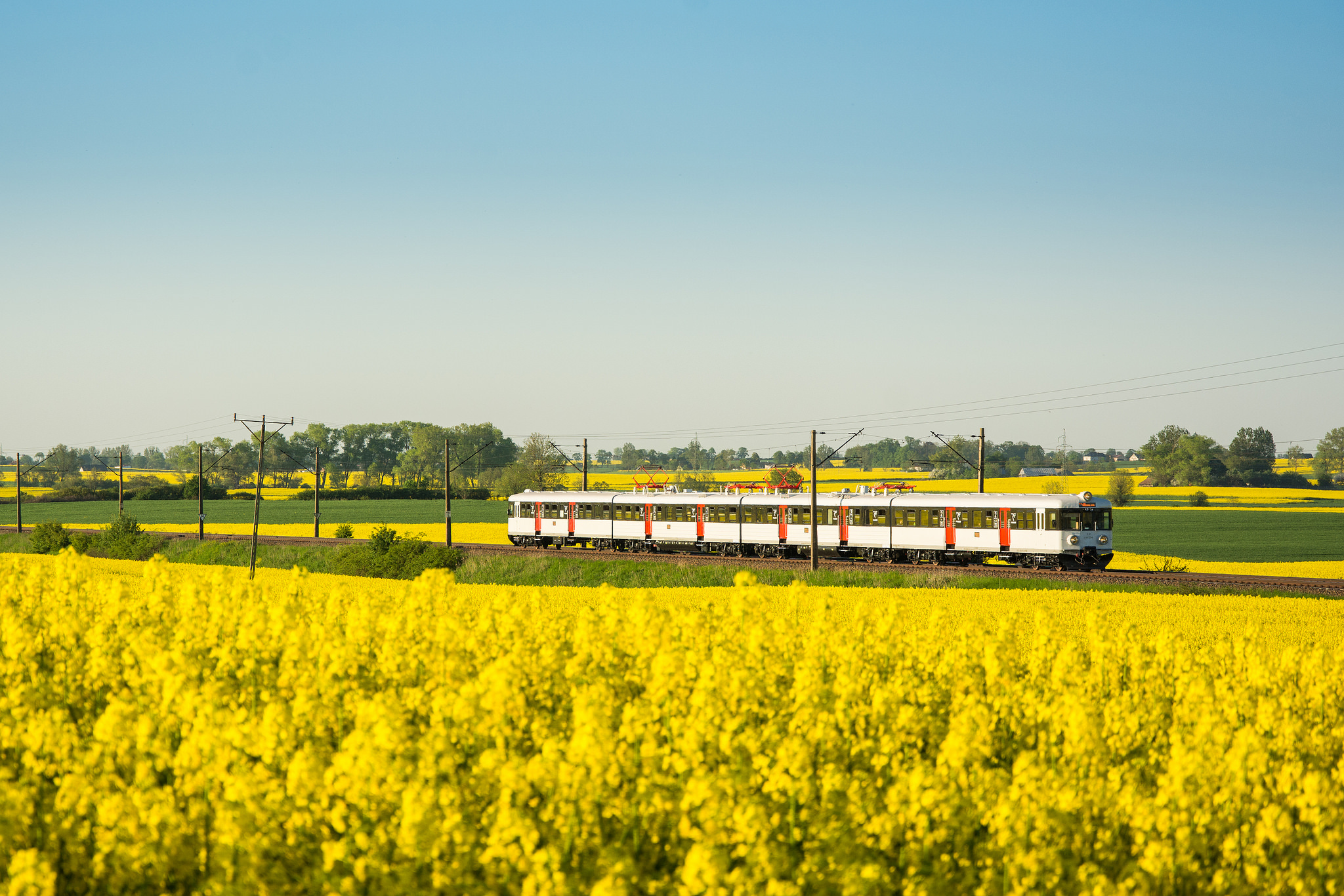
- An EN57 passes through fields around the village

- Location within Poland
- Coordinates: 53°57′47″N 18°46′2″E
- Country: Poland
- Voivodeship: Pomeranian
- County: Tczew
- Gmina: Pelplin

Population
  - Total: 520
- Time zone: UTC+1 (CET)
  - Summer (DST): UTC+2 (CEST)
- Vehicle registration: GTC

Gręblin [ˈɡrɛmblin] is a village in the administrative district of Gmina Pelplin, within Tczew County, Pomeranian Voivodeship, in northern Poland. It is located within the ethnocultural region of Kociewie in the historic region of Pomerania.

== History ==
Gręblin was a royal village of the Kingdom of Poland, administratively located in the Tczew County in the Pomeranian Voivodeship. It was annexed by Prussia in the First Partition of Poland in 1772, and restored to Poland, after Poland regained independence in 1918.

During the German occupation of Poland (World War II), in November 1939, the Germans murdered several Poles from Gręblin during large massacres carried out in the Szpęgawski Forest as part of the Intelligenzaktion.
