= Rašković =

Coordinates: 43.9606°N 20.7292°E

- Village
- Interactive map of Rašković
- Country: Serbia
- District: Šumadija District
- Municipality: Knić
- Time zone: UTC+1 (CET)
  - Summer (DST): UTC+2 (CEST)

Rašković is a village situated in Knić municipality in Serbia.
