= Krzysztof Charamsa =

Polish Catholic theologian and author

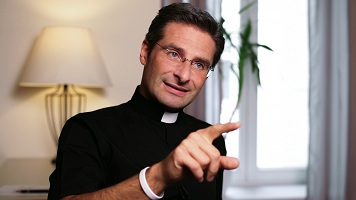
- Krzysztof Charamsa the day before his coming-out in the Vatican City
- Previous post: Priest in the Catholic Church

Orders
- Ordination: 28 June 1997

Personal details
- Born: Krzysztof Charamsa; 5 August 1972 (age 54)
- Denomination: Catholic (Latin Rite)
- Profession: Theologian, teacher
- Education: Pontifical Gregorian University (Doctor of Sacred Theology)

Krzysztof Olaf Charamsa (Polish pronunciation: [ˈkʂɨʂtɔf xaˈramsa]; born 5 August 1972) is a Polish theologian and author. In 2015, after declaring he was homosexual and in a relationship, he was suspended a divinis from his position as a Catholic priest and removed from all his previous posts in the Roman Curia.

== Early life and education ==
Charamsa was born on 5 August 1972 in Gdynia, Poland. His father worked as an economist, and his mother was a devout Catholic.

He studied theology and philosophy from 1991 to 1993 in Pelplin in Poland and from 1993 to 1997 at the Catholic theological faculty of Lugano (which is not part of the University of Lugano) in Switzerland. In 2002 he obtained a doctorate at the Pontifical Gregorian University.

== Presbytariate ==
Charamsa was ordained a priest of the Diocese of Pelplin 28 June 1997.

He taught theology at the Pontifical Athenaeum Regina Apostolorum beginning in 2004 and at the Pontifical Gregorian University beginning in 2009. From 2003 until 2015 he worked at the Congregation for the Doctrine of the Faith. He explained years later that he discovered that his colleagues had no understanding of what it was to be homosexual. He said that Pope Benedict XVI's 2005 ruling that even a celibate homosexual was not fit for the priesthood prompted him to public advocacy "to defend myself".

== Coming out ==
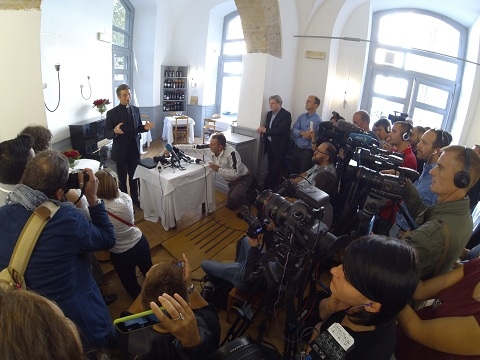
Krzysztof Charamsa coming out in Rome

Charamsa timed his coming out in anticipation of the second session of the Bishop's Synod on the Family, scheduled to begin on 4 October 2015. Two days before it opened, he announced he was gay in an interview in Polish for a film then in production, Article Eighteen, a documentary about the campaign for same-sex marriage in Poland. (Note: Article 18 of the Constitution of Poland reads: "Marriage, being a union of a man and a woman, as well as the family, motherhood and parenthood, shall be placed under the protection and care of the Republic of Poland." The film is scheduled for release in 2017.) His announcement attracted considerable attention in the Polish media.

On the eve of the Synod, he announced in Corriere della Sera, one of Italy's most important newspapers, that he is gay and has a consensual partner. He said: "I want the Church and my community to know who I am: a gay priest who is happy, and proud of his identity. I'm prepared to pay the consequences, but it's time the Church opened its eyes, and realised that offering gay believers total abstinence from a life of love is inhuman." He also gave a press conference at which his partner, identified as Eduard, appeared beside him. (Note: He was later identified as Eduard Planas, 44, a computer technology specialist.)

The Vatican immediately dismissed Charamsa from his teaching positions and his posts in the Roman Curia. On 21 October, Bishop Ryszard Kasyna of Pelplin, the diocese in which Charamsa was ordained, suspended him a divinis from the priesthood, forbidding him to perform the sacraments or wear clerical garb. He has not been laicized. (Note: Charamsa, writing on 21 October 2015, refers to correspondence with his bishop that ended in his suspension.) He was forced to move from the convent in Rome where he had lived for years while serving as a chaplain.

While many gay activists cheered Charamsa's move, seeing him as a whistleblower in the Vatican, some gay Catholics criticized his confrontational stance for fear of angering the Church. The organizers of a conference of Italian gay Catholics, the Rainbow Catholics Assembly, scheduled for 3 October were frustrated that the media focused on Charamsa's story and not their more respectful approach, which had even succeeded in attracting Bishop José Raúl Vera López of Saltillo, Mexico, as one of their speakers.

Charamsa later narrated his experience as a gay priest in his 2016 book Kamień węgielny ("The First Stone").

== Critique of the Synod and the Catholic Church ==
On 28 October, shortly after the Synod ended, Charamsa released a letter he has sent to Pope Francis on 3 October. He accused the church of "making life hell" for millions of gay Catholics. He wrote that he hoped Francis will understand the torment gay priests suffer and thanked Francis for some of his words and gestures towards gay people. However, he criticised the Catholic Church for being "frequently violently homophobic" and "insensitive, unfair and brutal" towards people that are gay, despite the fact that he claimed there are significant numbers of gay men at all levels within the Church, including the College of Cardinals. He called for all statements from the Holy See that are offensive and violent against gay people to be withdrawn, citing the policy put in place by Pope Benedict XVI's in 2005 that forbids men with deep-rooted homosexual tendencies from becoming priests. He said Benedict's characterization of homosexuality as "a strong tendency ordered toward an intrinsic moral evil" was "diabolical".

He also assessed the Synod's work on the Church's approach to gays and lesbians. He criticised the Synod for restating stereotypes about gay people. He said: "If the Church can't make a serious, scientific reflection on homosexuality and include it in its teachings, even the Holy Father's openings and warm words on gays are empty." He quoted Cardinal Robert Sarah, who told the Synod: "What Nazi-Fascism and Communism were in the 20th century, Western homosexual and abortion ideologies and Islamic fanaticism are today." Charamsa commented: "No one publicly said a word against those defamatory sentences. What kind of respect does that show to us all?"

When asked if he planned to marry his partner, Charamsa said that marriage is "part of the dynamic of love and I thank God that I live in a century where it's possible, thanks to the homosexual movement and thanks to many homosexual martyrs". He also defended the timing of his announcement on the eve of the Synod: "Many people have said it was so spectacular, so big, that it did not come at a good time. With these people I have a question: when is it a good time to come out in the church? When? After the synod? The answer is: 'never'. The responsible time for coming out is never."

Charamsa supports gay rights and same-sex marriage and also supports mercy and forgiveness towards women who have had an abortion. Charamsa believes that priests with secure incomes and no family pressures cannot understand the pressures driving poor women to abortions.

== Suspension ==
Bishop Ryszard Kasyna suspended Charamsa, revoking his faculties to celebrate Mass, administer the sacraments, and wear a cassock or any priestly attire. The reason given was his failure to abide by the rules of priestly conduct, following an earlier official warning, according to a statement on the website of the Diocese of Pelplin.

== Writings ==
- L'immutabilità di Dio. L'insegnamento di San Tommaso d'Aquino nei suoi sviluppi presso i commentatori scolastici, Editrice Gregoriana, Rom 2002.
- Davvero Dio soffre? La Tradizione e l'insegnamento di San Tommaso, Edizioni Studio Domenicano, Bologna 2003 (ISBN 88-7094-485-9).
- Il Rosario – una scuola di preghiera contemplativa, Libreria Editrice Vaticana, Città del Vaticano 2003 (ISBN 88-209-7435-5).
- Percorsi di formazione sacerdotale, Libreria Editrice Vaticana, Città del Vaticano 2005, con G. Borgonovo (ISBN 88-209-7694-3).
- Eucaristia e libertà, Libreria Editrice Vaticana, Città del Vaticano 2006, con G. Borgonovo (ISBN 88-209-7838-5).
- La voce della fede cristiana. Introduzione al Cristianesimo di Joseph Ratzinger – Benedetto XVI, 40 anni dopo, ART, Rom 2009, con N. Capizzi (ISBN 978-88-89174-89-0).
- Abitare la Parola. In compagnia della Madre del Verbo, Editrice Rogate, Roma 2011 (ISBN 978-88-8075-402-2).
- Virtù e vocazione. Un cammino mariano, Editrice Rogate, Roma 2014 (ISBN 978-88-8075-426-8).
- La Prima Pietra. Io, prete gay, e la mi ribellione all'ipocrisia della Chiesa (Autobiography), Rizzoli, Milan 2016 (ISBN 978-88-1709-021-6)

== See also ==
- Homosexuality and the Catholic Church
