= Ryszard Kasyna =

Polish Catholic bishop (born 1957)

Mgr. Ryszard Kasyna
- Bishop of Pelplin
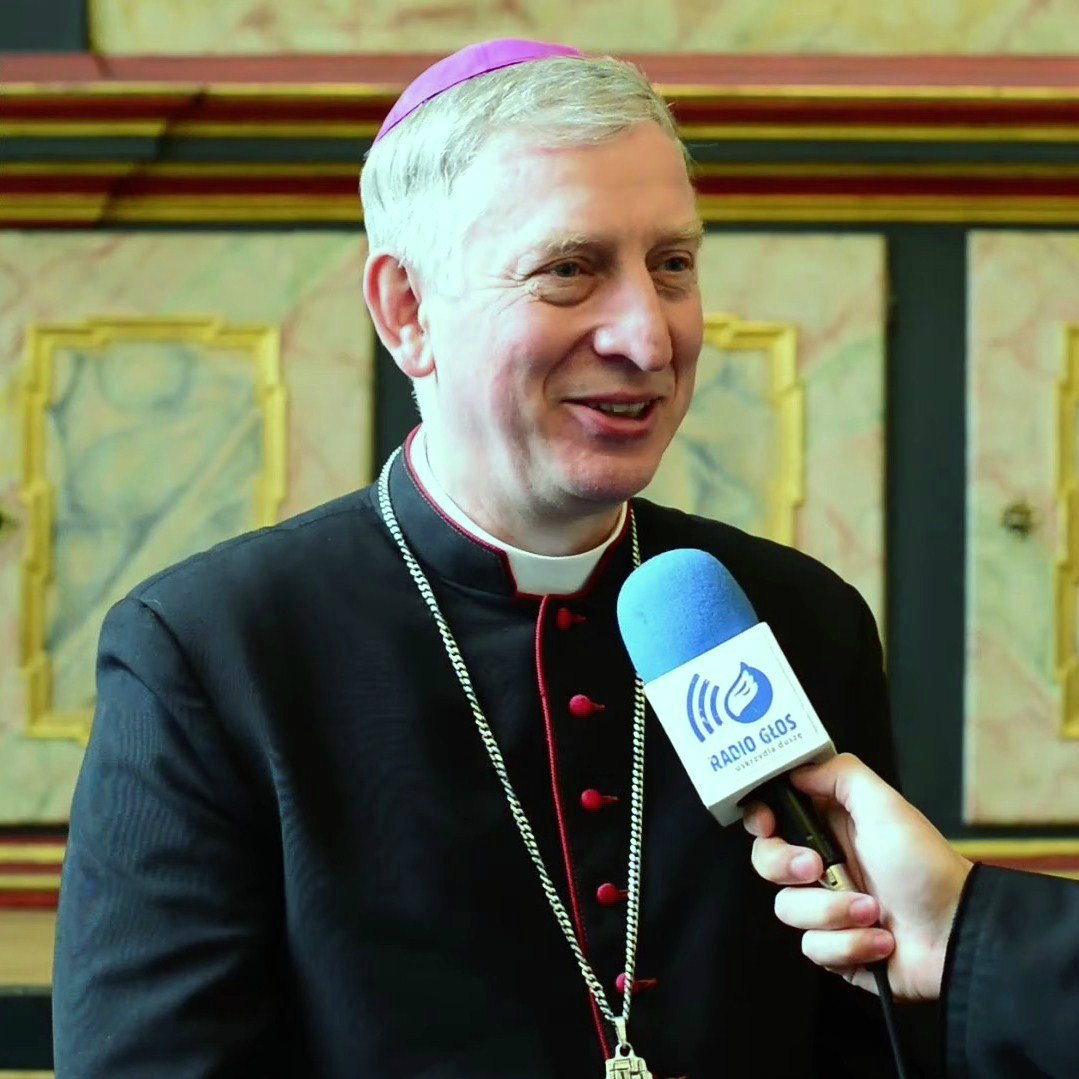
- Kasyna in 2015
- Church: Roman Catholic Church
- Archdiocese: Gdańsk
- Diocese: Pelplin
- In office: 2012 –
- Predecessor: Jan Bernard Szlaga
- Previous posts: Auxiliary Bishop of Gdańsk; Titular Bishop of Dices

Orders
- Ordination: 24 January 1982 by Lech Kaczmarek
- Consecration: 6 January 1998 by Józef Kowalczyk
- Rank: Bishop

Personal details
- Born: 28 September 1957 (age 68) Nowy Staw, Poland
- Motto: In Veritate Et Caritate
- Coat of arms

Ryszard Kasyna (born 28 September 1957) is a Polish Roman Catholic bishop, being the bishop of the Roman Catholic Diocese of Pelplin since 2012. He was previously the auxiliary bishop of Roman Catholic Archdiocese of Gdańsk and titular bishop of the Diocese of Dices from 2005 to 2012.

== Biography ==
=== Early life ===
Kasyna was born on 28 September 1957 in Nowy Staw to a family of four children. He graduated from the First High School Henryk Sienkiewicz in Malbork. Kasyna then went on to study at the Bishop's Seminary in Gdańsk-Oliwa, and on 24 January 1982 he was ordained priest in the Oliwa Cathedral by Lech Kaczmarek, then the diocesan bishop of Gdańsk. On 3 February 1982 he was a vicar and catechist of the Holy Spirit parish at the Royal Chapel - in St. Mary's Basilica in Gdańsk, where he also served during his studies. Starting in September 1985, he began specialized studies in canon law at the Pontifical Lateran University in Rome, where he graduated in 1992 and completed his doctorate with a dissertation on indulgences in the new canonical legislation. The same year he graduated and obtained a certificate from the Roman Rota.

=== Priestly ministry ===
As aforementioned from 1982 to 1985 Kasyna worked as a vicar in the parish at St. Mary's Basilica in Gdańsk. After returning home from studies in 1992, he joined the Gdańsk Metropolitan Tribunal. In 1993 he became his vice-official in the tribunal and in 1996 an official. During this time Kasyna also lectured on canon and legal law at the seminary in Gdańsk and in other theological institutes. He joined the college of consultors and the priesthood council of the Gdańsk Archdiocese. He served as a pastor of lawyers. He also became a lawyer of the Roman Rota. In 1998 he was appointed a canon canon of the Gdańsk Archcathedral Chapter, and in 2001 a chaplain to the bishop of Gdańsk, Tadeusz Gocłowski.

=== Ordination as bishop ===
On 24 January 2005, Kasyna was appointed by Pope John Paul II as auxiliary bishop of the Archdiocese of Gdańsk, as well as the titular bishop of Dices. He was ordained a bishop on 2 Apr 2005 in the St. Mary's Basilica in Gdańsk, with the consecrator being Józef Kowalczyk, and the co-consecrators being Tadeusz Gocłowski, archbishop of Gdańsk, and Piotr Libera, the titular bishop of Centuria. Kasyna choose "In Veritate Et Caritate" (In Truth and Love) as his bishops motto.

On 27 October 2012 Pope Benedict XVI appointed Kasyna as the new bishop of Pelplin, succeeding the deceased Jan Bernard Szlaga. He was officially installed as bishop in the Cathedral Basilica of the Assumption on 8 December 2012.

=== Life as Bishop ===
A long time member of the Episcopal Conference of Poland, Kasyna has been member and head of various committees. These include being a delegate for the Ministry of the Sea, as well as a member of the Clergy Committee, the Mixed Committee, Bishops - Major Religious Superiors, and the Legal Council. In 2010 he became a member of the Supreme Tribunal of the Apostolic Signature.
