= Jan Bernard Szlaga =

Polish Roman Catholic prelate (1940–2012)

Jan Szlaga
- Bishop of Pelplin
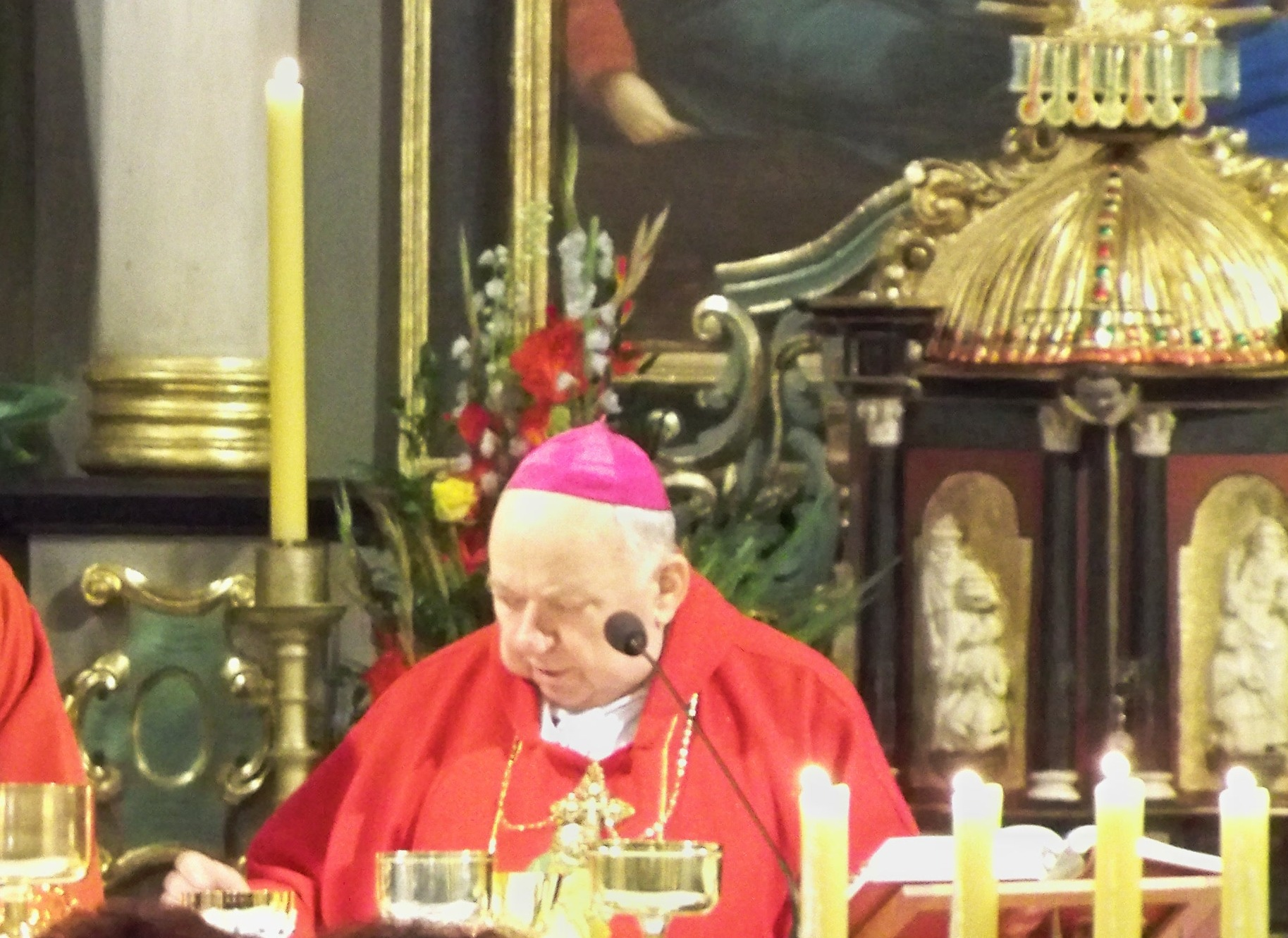
- Szlaga in 2011
- Appointed: 18 February 1984
- Term ended: 15 September 2011
- Previous post: Auxiliary Auxiliary Bishop of Chełmno (1988–1992)

Orders
- Ordination: 9 March 1963 by Kazimierz Kowalski
- Consecration: 25 June 1988 by Józef Glemp

Personal details
- Born: 24 May 1940 Gdingen, Nazi Germany
- Died: 25 April 2012 (aged 71) Starogard Gdański, Poland
- Buried: Pelplin Abbey
- Education: KUL
- Alma mater: Pontifical Biblical Institute
- Motto: Parare vias Domini (transl. Prepare God's Way)
- Coat of arms

Jan Bernard Szlaga (24 May 1940 – 25 April 2012) was the Roman Catholic bishop of the Roman Catholic Diocese of Pelplin, Poland. He was born the youngest of six children of Jan and Helena (née Sciesińska) Szlaga.

== Education and early career ==
From 1947 to 1953 Szlaga attended elementary school in Gdynia and then went attended Collegium Leoninum in Wejherowo and Collegium Marianum in Pelplin. He studied at the Pelplin Higher Seminary (Polish: Wyższe Seminarium Duchowne w Pelplinie) and was ordained a Roman Catholic priest in Chełmno in 1963. From 1965 to 1969 Father Szlaga continued his biblical studies at the Catholic University of Lublin and from 1972 to 1973 at the Pontifical Biblical Institute in Rome. Upon completing his doctorate in theology, Szlaga took on academic duties in addition to his priestly duties:

- Assistant to Professor of Biblical Studies, Catholic University of Lublin
- Vice-Dean at Catholic University of Lublin
- Dean of the Faculty of Theology 1981-1984
- Lecturer at the Major Seminary in Lublin, Pelplin Seminary and Nicolaus Copernicus University in Toruń.
- Professor at the University of Gdańsk's Faculty of Languages and History 1991-2001
- Member of the Studiorum Novi Testamenti Societas
- Ordinary Member of the Scientific Society of CUL

== As bishop ==
In 1988, Szlaga was named Auxiliary Bishop of Chełmno and Titular Bishop of Mascula. In 1992 he was consecrated as Bishop of Pelplin. While serving as Bishop he received Commander's Cross of the Order of Polish Rebirth. He was named an honorary citizen of Chojnice (1994), Starogard Gdański (2007) and Gdynia (2008), and received the 2010 Award For Services to Pomerania.

Szlaga's health declined just before he was to act as main consecrator of the new Auxiliary Bishop Wiesław Śmigiel and he died on 25 April 2012. He is buried beside the altar at the Cathedral Basilica of the Assumption of the Blessed Virgin Mary at Pelplin Abbey.
