= Diocese of Pelplin =

Roman Catholic diocese in Poland

Coordinates: 53°55′34″N 18°42′04″E

Diocese of Pelplin Dioecesis Pelplinensis Diecezja Pelplińska

Catholic
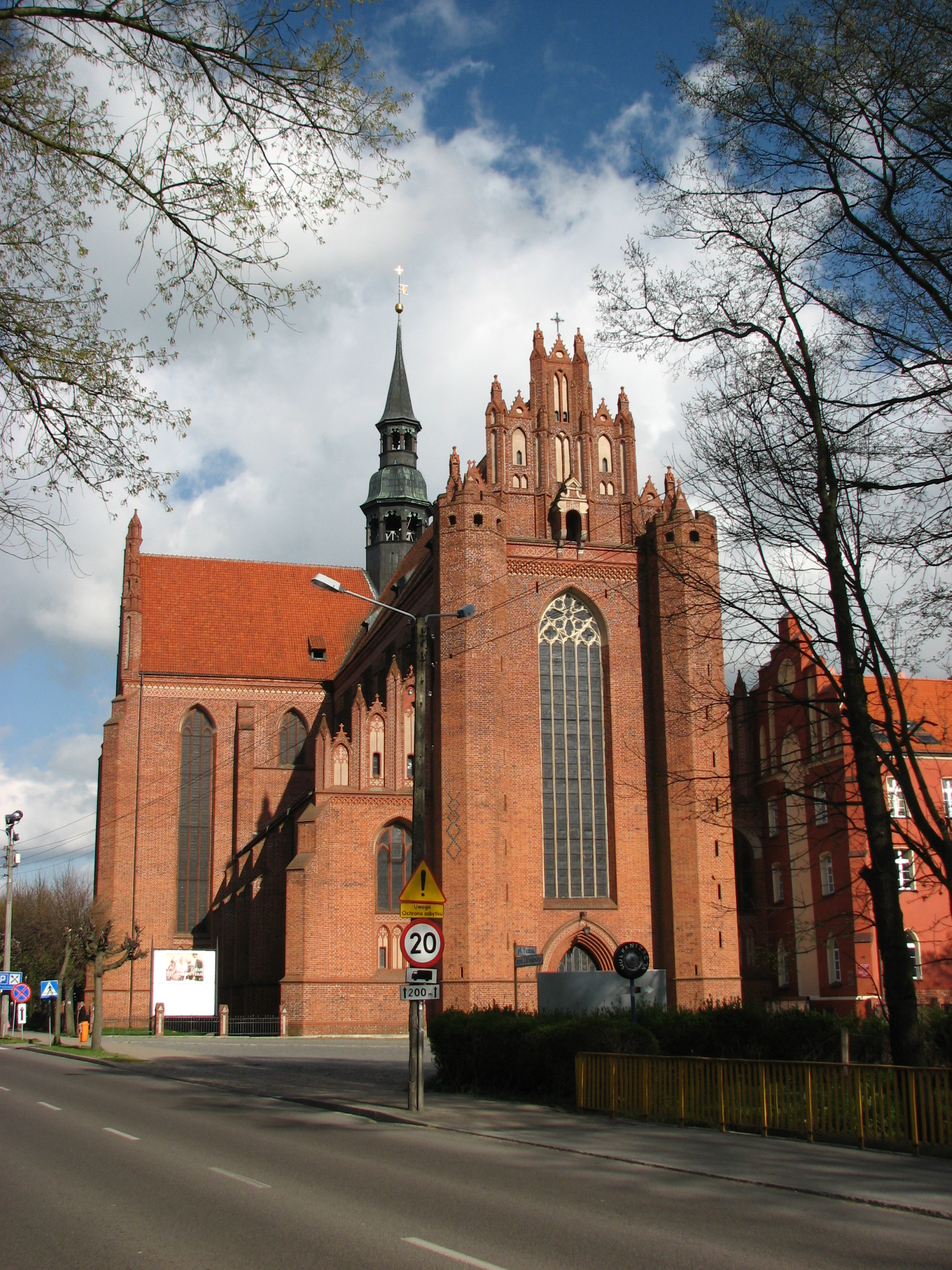
- Cathedral Basilica of the Assumption in Pelplin

Location
- Country: Poland
- Metropolitan: Gdańsk

Statistics
- Area: 13,361 km^{2} (5,159 sq mi)
- Population: Total; Catholics: (as of 2021); 785,520; 728,000 (92.7%)

Information
- Denomination: Catholic Church
- Sui iuris church: Latin Church
- Rite: Roman Rite
- Cathedral: Bazylika Katedralna Wniebowzięcia Najświętszej Maryi Panny (Cathedral Basilica of the Assumption of the Blessed Virgin Mary)
- Patron saint: Our Mother of Perpetual Help (Principal); Saint Lawrence (Secondary)

Current leadership
- Pope: Leo XIV
- Bishop: Ryszard Kasyna
- Metropolitan Archbishop: Tadeusz Wojda
- Auxiliary Bishops: Arkadiusz Okroj

Website
- Website of the Diocese

Map of Roman Catholic Diocese of Pelpin

The Diocese of Pelplin (Latin: Pelplinen(sis); Kashubian: Pelplińskô diecezjô) is a Latin Church ecclesiastical territory or diocese located in the city of Pelplin, Poland. It is a suffragan diocese in the ecclesiastical province of metropolitan Archdiocese of Gdańsk. The biggest city of diocese is Tczew.

== History ==
- 1243: Established as part of Roman Catholic Diocese of Chełmno
- March 25, 1992: Roman Catholic Diocese of Chełmno split into the Diocese of Pelplin and The Diocese of Toruń
- June 27, 2023: Pope Francis, through the Dicastery for Divine Worship and the Discipline of the Sacraments, proclaimed the Blessed Virgin Mary as "Our Mother of Perpetual Help" the principal patroness, and Saint Lawrence as secondary patron of the diocese.

== Special churches ==
- Minor Basilicas:
  - Bazylika Ścięcia Świętego Jana Chrzciciela (Basilica of the Beheading of St. John Baptist), Chojnice

== Leadership ==
- Bishops of Pelplin
  - Bishop Ryszard Kasyna (since 2012.12.08)
  - Bishop Jan Bernard Szlaga (1992.03.25 – 2012.04.25)
- Bishops of Chelmno
  - Archbishop Marian Przykucki (1981.06.15 – 1992.03.25)
  - Bishop Bernard Czapliński (1973.03.16 – 1980.12.30)
  - Bishop Kazimierz Jósef Kowalski (1946.03.04 – 1972.05.06)
  - Bishop Carl Maria Splett (Apostolic Administrator 1940.12.05 – 1946.03.04)
  - Bishop Stanislao Okoniewski (1926.10.04 – 1944)
  - Bishop Augustinus Rosentreter (1898.12.22 – 1926.10.04)
  - Bishop Leo Redner (1886.11.16 – 1898.04.01)
  - Bishop Johannes von der Marwitz (1857.01.14 – 1886.03.29)
  - Bishop Anastasius Johannes Sedlag (1833.07.28 – 1856.09.23)
  - Bishop Ignatius Vincentius Matthy (1823.11.17 – 1832.05.20)
  - Bishop Franciszek Ksawery Graf Rydzyński (1795.10.10 – 1814.10.16)
  - Bishop Johann Karl Reichsgraf von Hohenzollern-Hechingen (1785.01.31 – 1795.12.18)
  - Bishop Antoni Onufry Okecki (1771.03.04 – 1775.05.29)
  - Bishop Andrzej Ignacy Baier (1758.11.18 – 1785.01.31)
  - Bishop Wojciech Stanisław Leski, O. Cist. (1746.10.17 – 1758.09.19)
  - Bishop Andrzej Stanisław Załuski (1739.03.08 – 1746.05.02)
  - Bishop Adam Stanisław Grabowski (1736.09.26 – 1739.07.15)
  - Bishop Józef Eustachy Szembek (1736 – 1753)
  - Bishop Thomaz Franciszek Czapski, O. Cist. (1730.12.06 – 1733.04.23)
  - Bishop Feliks Ignacy Kretowski (1722.11.20 – 1730.12.06)
  - Bishop Jan Kazimierz de Alten Bokum (1718.06.27 – 1721.06.30)
  - Archbishop Teodor Andrzej Potocki (1699.04.11 – 1712.06.10)
  - Bishop Kazimierz Szczuka (1693.10.02 – 1694.06.30)
  - Bishop Jan Kazimierz Opaliński, O. Cist. (1681.06.23 – 1693.07.22)
  - Bishop Jan Małachowski (1676.06.22 – 1681.05.12)
  - Archbishop Andrzej Olszowski (1661.02.23 – 1674.10.01)
  - Bishop Adam Kos (1657.11.11 – 1661.02.11)
  - Bishop Jan Gembicki (1653.04.21 – 1655.05.11)
  - Archbishop Andrzej Leszczyński (1646.05.04 – 1653.01.08)
  - Archbishop Jan Lipski (1636 – 1639)
  - Archbishop Wawrzyniec Gembicki (1600 – 1610)
  - Cardinal Stanisław Hosius (1549.07.12 – 1551.05.11)

== See also ==
- Catholic Church in Poland
- Konstantyn Dominik

== Sources ==
- GCatholic.org
- Catholic Hierarchy
- Diocese website
- Servant of God, Bishop Konstantyn Dominik
