= Pelplin =

Town in Poland

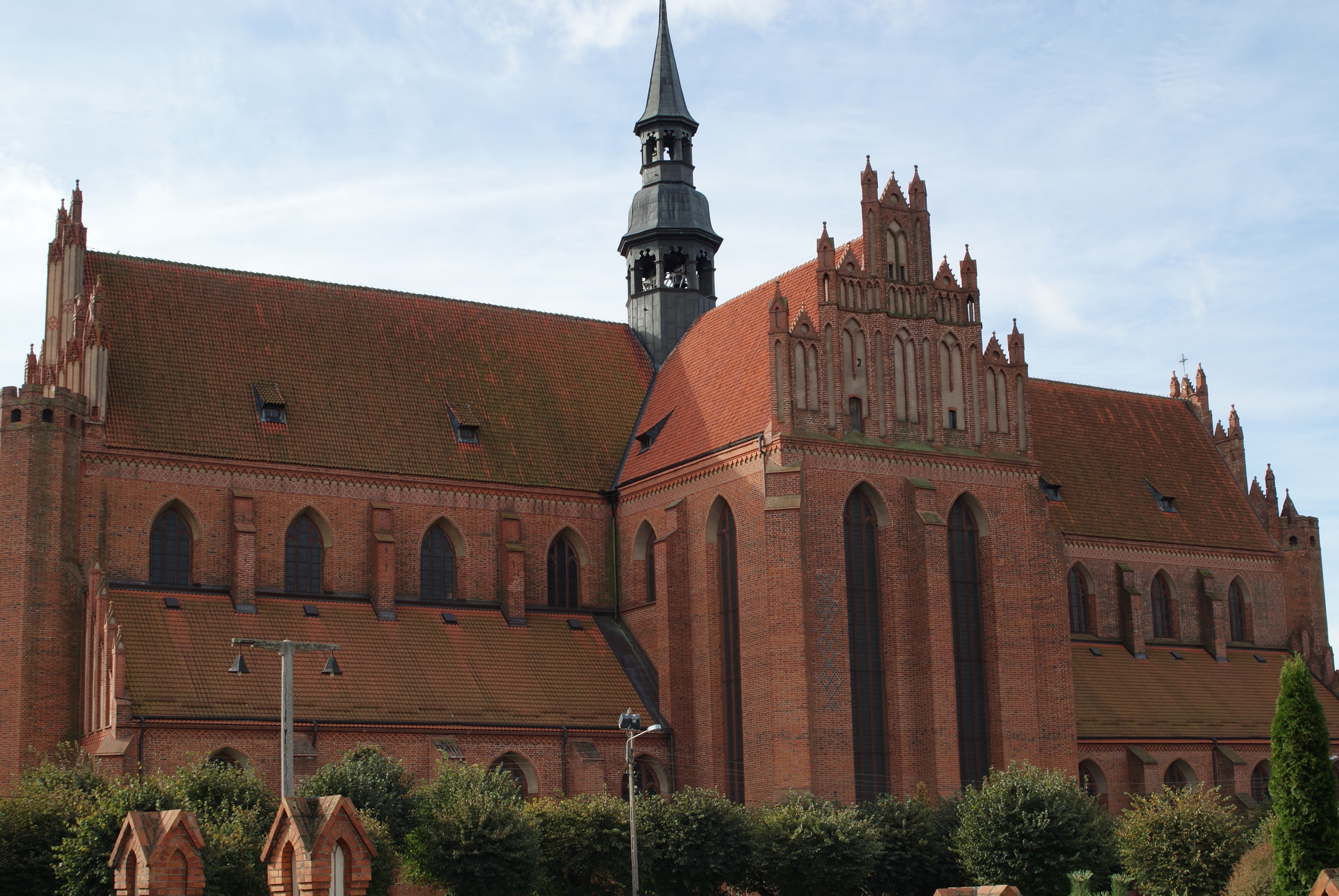
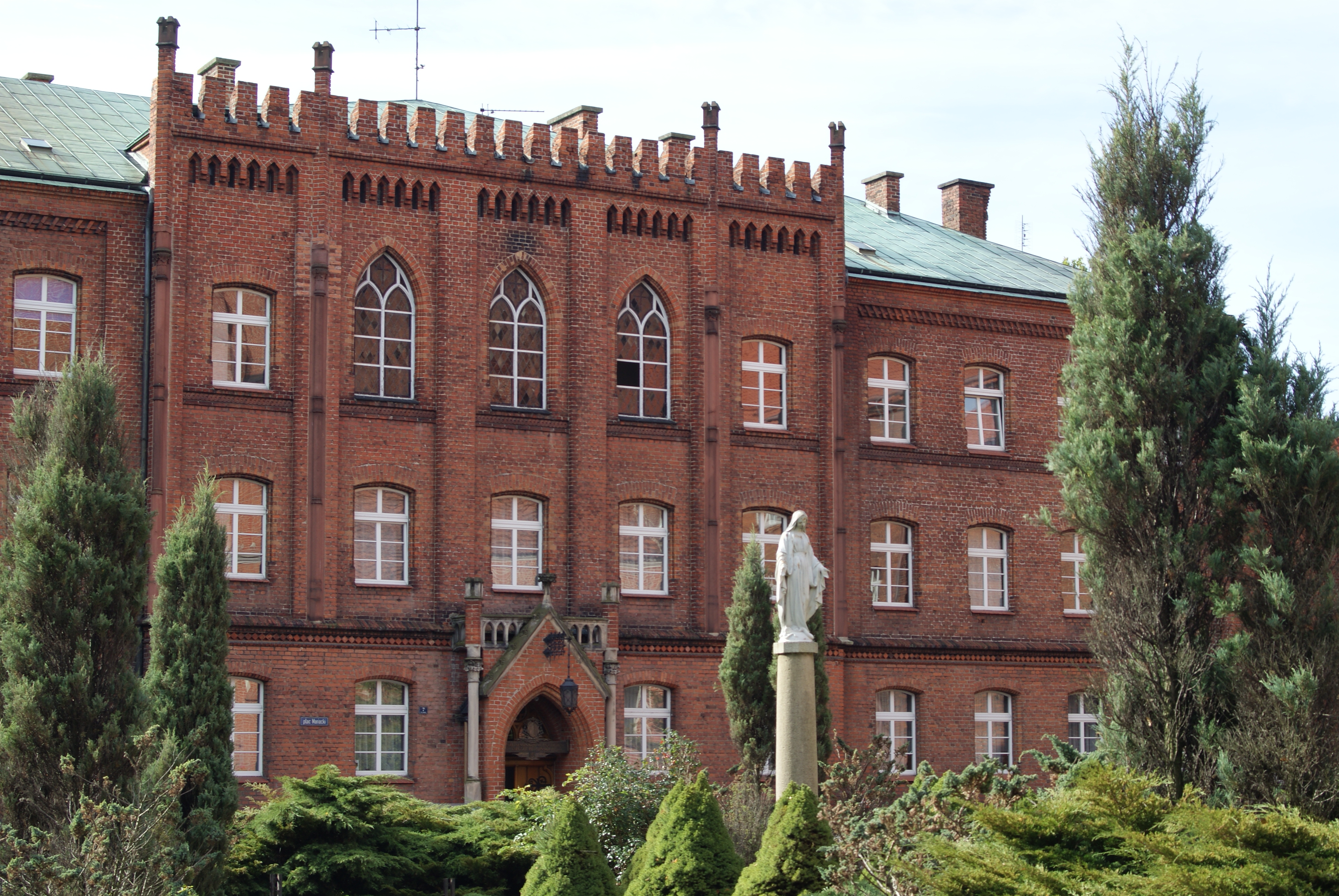
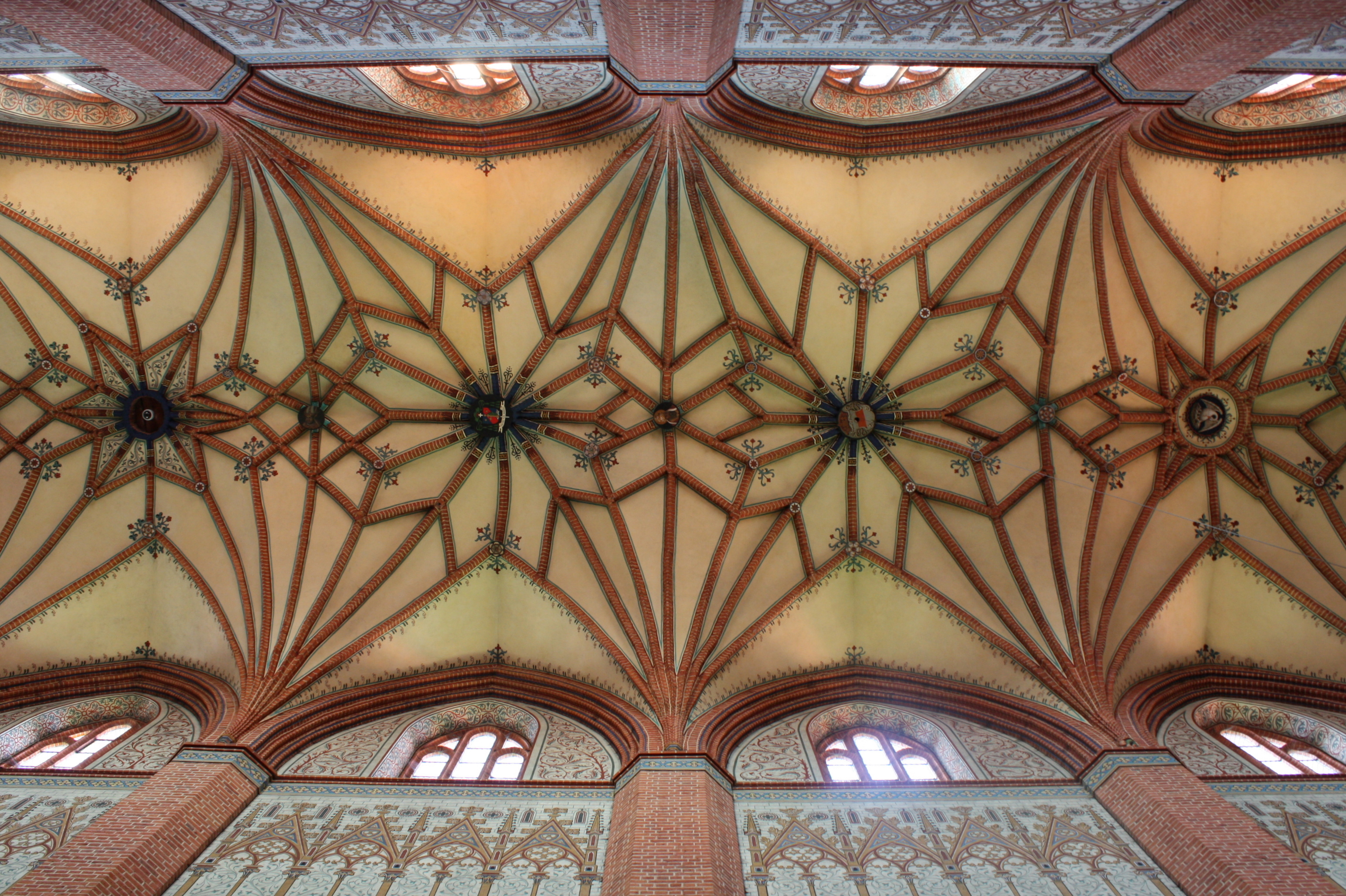
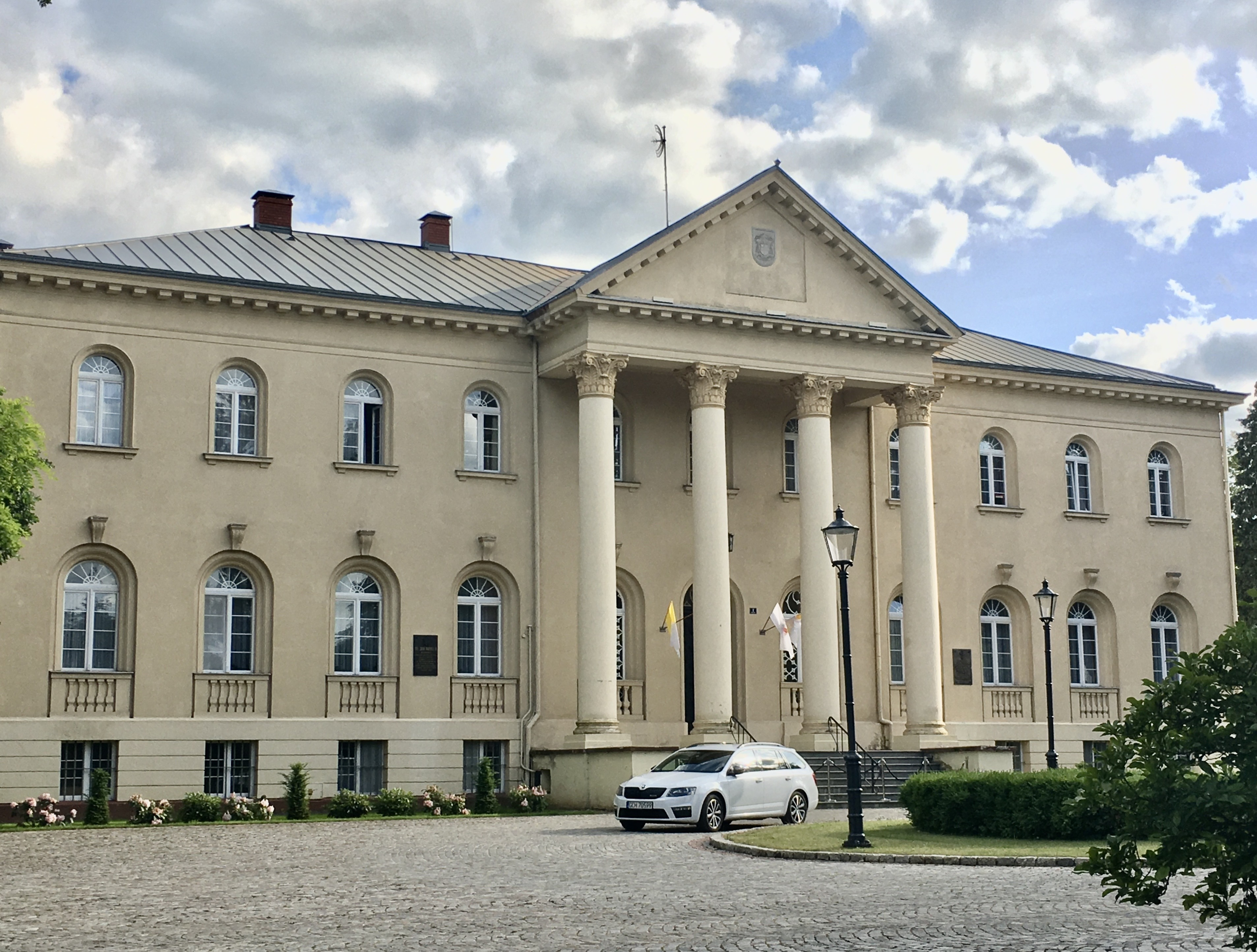
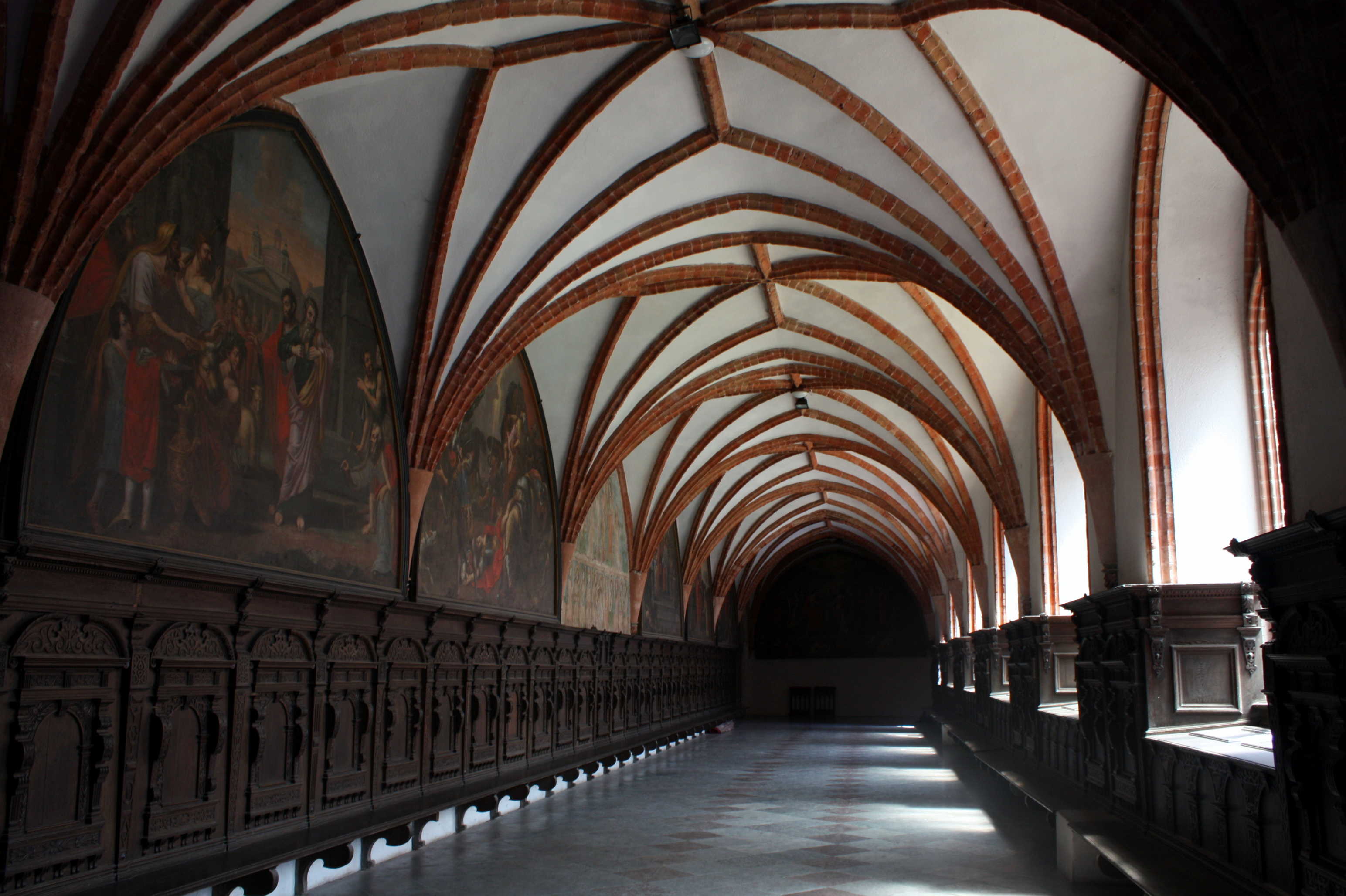
- Pelplin Cathedral Seminary Cathedral interior Episcopal palace Pelplin Abbey

- Flag Coat of arms

- Location within Poland
- Coordinates: 53°55′41″N 18°41′52″E
- Country: Poland
- Voivodeship: Pomeranian
- County: Tczew
- Gmina: Pelplin
- First mentioned: 1274
- Town rights: 1931

Government
  - Mayor: Mirosław Chyła

Area
  - Total: 4.45 km^{2} (1.72 sq mi)

Population (2009)
  - Total: 8,320
  - Density: 1,870/km^{2} (4,840/sq mi)
- Time zone: UTC+1 (CET)
  - Summer (DST): UTC+2 (CEST)
- Postal code: 83-130
- Vehicle registration: GTC
- Website: http://www.pelplin.pl

Pelplin (pronounced [ˈpɛlplʲin]) is a town in northern Poland, in the Tczew County, Pomeranian Voivodship. Population: 8,320 (2009).

Pelplin is located in the ethnocultural region of Kociewie in Pomerania. It is home to one of the finest collections of medieval art in Poland held at the Diocesan Museum in Pelplin. It is known for the landmark Gothic Pelplin Cathedral, former abbey church, one of the largest Gothic churches in Poland. The former Pelplin Abbey is the seat of the Roman Catholic Diocese of Pelplin. The cathedral complex, with the abbey, theological seminary, Corpus Christi church, Episcopal Palace and Park, etc. is listed as a Historic Monument of Poland, as one of the most precious Polish heritage sites of its kind.

== Geographical location ==
Pelplin lies in a valley on both sides of river Wierzyca, a left affluent of river Vistula in Pomerania, which ends up in the Vistula at the town of Gniew. Pelplin is located about 11 kilometres (7 miles) west of the Vistula, 12 km (7 miles) south-east of the town of Starogard Gdański, 19 km (12 miles) south-west the town of Tczew and 50 km (31 miles) south of the regional capitol of Gdańsk. It is surrounded by a chain of little hills, its altitude varies between 8 metres (26 feet) above sea level at the lowlands of the Vistula in the east and 86 metres (282 feet) above sea level at 'Czubatka' hill in the west.

== History ==
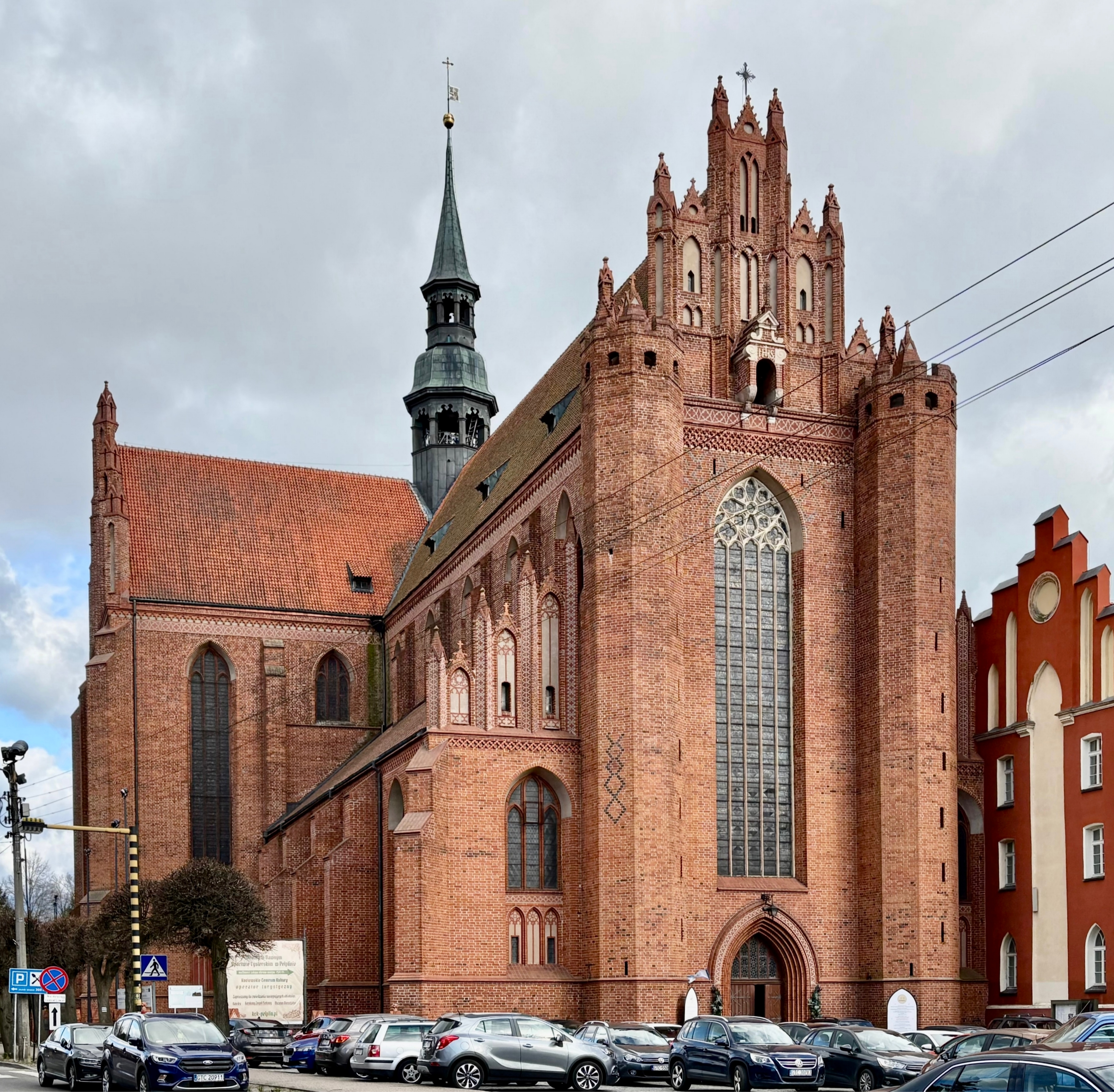
Pelplin Cathedral, cathedral of the former monastery of the Cistercians (1274–1819)

Archaeological findings have revealed that human settlements existed in the region of the town already during the Stone Age and the Bronze Age.

The history of Pelplin is tightly interwoven with the history of the Monastery of Pelplin, which according to the monastery's chronicle was founded in 1274 by Mestwin II, Duke of Pomerania. The monastery of Pelplin had a forerunner in the monastery of the Cistercians in Pogódki located at the upper course of the Wierzyca, which had been founded in 1258 by Sambor II, Duke of Pomerania. In 1276 the monks, which had come from the Monastery of Doberan in Mecklenburg to Pogódki, began to transfer their monastery to Pelplin.

From Pelplin, the German monks organized an extensive settlement campaign. They brought in dispossessed farmers and craftsmen and founded a number of villages in the area. The initiative came from Duke Sambor II, who wanted to compensate population losses of the past, which had occurred because of wars with Pomeralia's neighbours, the Kingdom of Poland in the south and the Old Prussians in the east.

The monks also began to build an impressive Gothic cathedral, now the Pelplin Abbey, using mainly bricks as construction material. According to the monastery's chronicle, work on the building was taken up already prior to 1294 by Mestwin II, Duke of Pomerania, and was completed during the second half of the 14th century, amounting to a building time of almost 200 years. The monastery was attached to the southern side of the cathedral. It was enlarged considerably during subsequent centuries. The cathedral of the Cistercians, now Pelplin Abbey, is recognized as one of the most important examples of sacral architecture in the Vistula region.

As far as matters concerning the church were concerned, the region of Pelplin was at that time subordinated to the administration of the Archdiocese of Gniezno.

Pelplin was part of the Duchy of Pomerania (Eastern/Gdańsk Pomerania), which in 1227 separated from Poland as a result of the fragmentation of the state. In 1282, Duke Mestwin II and Polish Duke Przemysł II (future King of Poland) signed the Treaty of Kępno, which transferred the suzerainty over Gdańsk Pomerania including Pelplin to Przemysł II and, subsequently, after Mestwin II's death in 1294, Pelplin was reintegrated with Poland. In 1310 the Teutonic Order captured Gdańsk Pomerania and incorporated it into the monastic State of the Teutonic Order. In 1454, Polish King Casimir IV Jagiellon signed the act of re-incorporation of the territory to the Kingdom of Poland, and in the Second Peace of Thorn of 1466, the Teutonic Knights renounced any claims to the region, and recognized it as part of Poland. Pelplin was since part of the Pomeranian Voivodeship in the autonomous province of Royal Prussia in the Greater Poland Province. In the following centuries several Polish Kings visited the Pelplin Abbey, among them Sigismund III Vasa and John III Sobieski. During the reformation, the last abbot of the monastery of Doberan moved in 1552 to the affiliated monastery of Pelplin.

=== Partitions of Poland ===
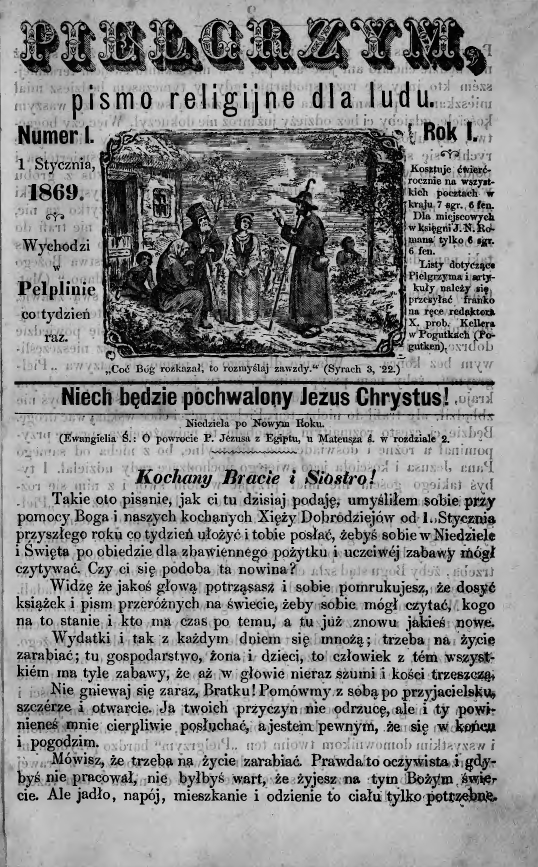
First issue of local Polish Christian newspaper Pielgrzym, 1869

In 1772, during the First Partition of Poland by the Russia, Austria and Prussia, Pelplin was annexed into the Kingdom of Prussia, in 1773 it was included into the newly formed province West Prussia, composed from just annexed Polish territory, and the religious and political discrimination of the Poles greatly intensified. Pelplin was subjected to Germanisation policies.

In 1819 the Pelplin monastery was suppressed. After the monastic buildings had been modified, they were utilized since 1824 as the seat of the Bishopric of Chełmno (Culm), which was moved to Pelplin. By that time Pelplin had remained a small village with several pubs. Since 1824 it began to develop rapidly due to the accommodation of a number of ecclesiastical and clerical institutions. In 1238 a training school for priests was founded, and since 1835 there existed also the Collegium Marianum, an episcopal Progymnasium.

The economical development of Pelplin accelerated after 1852, when the village was connected to the new railway line Bydgoszcz—Gdańsk (Bromberg—Danzig). In 1905 there existed in addition a supreme forestry superintendent's office, an engineering-works and a sugar factory. In 1906–1907, local Polish children joined the children school strikes against Germanisation that spread throughout the Prussian Partition of Poland. Up to 1920 Pelplin belonged to Kreis Dirschau in the administrative district of Regierungsbezirk Danzig in West Prussia.

=== Return to independence ===
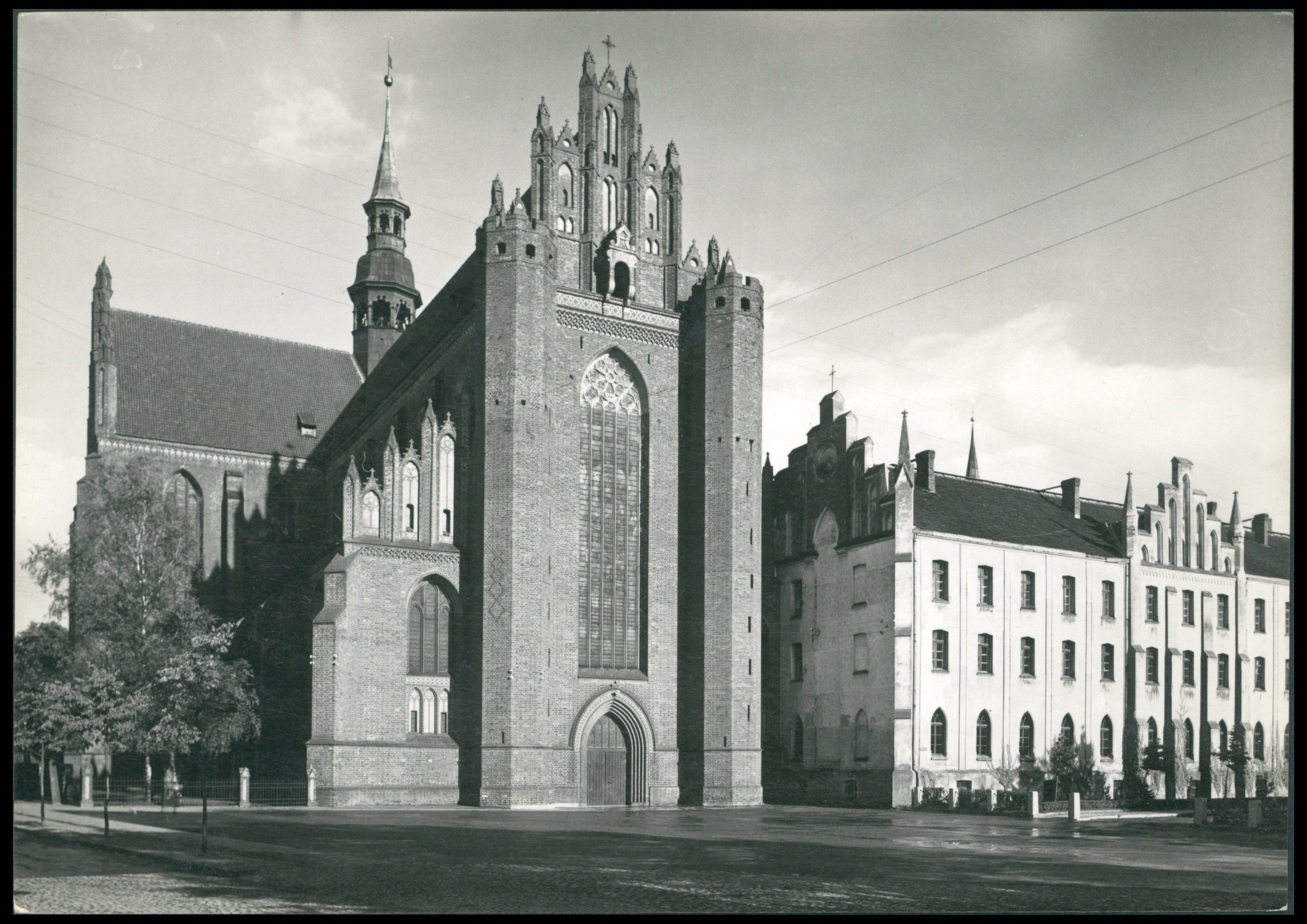
Pelplin Cathedral in the 1930s

After World War I Poland regained independence, and as a consequence of Treaty of Versailles the Pelplin was re-integrated into the Second Republic of Poland. In 1925 the bishopric of Chełmno was renamed as bishopric of Pelplin. In 1931, Pelplin received town rights.

=== World War II ===
In 1939, after the invasion of Poland, which started World War II, Gdańsk Pomerania was annexed by Nazi Germany and incorporated into the newly formed province of Reichsgau Danzig-West Prussia. During the German occupation, the Polish population was subjected to mass arrests, repressions, deportations to concentration camps, expulsions and massacres. Mass arrests especially pertained to Polish teachers and clergy, and were carried out in September and October 1939 (see: Intelligenzaktion, Nazi persecution of the Catholic Church in Poland). 16 priests were murdered at the local shooting range, and others were imprisoned in Tczew, and later murdered during large massacres of Poles in the Szpęgawski Forest. On 20 October 1939, 44 inhabitants were murdered in the Szpęgawski Forest. The Germans removed traces of Polish heritage from the cathedral and the seminary, and also looted or destroyed historic Polish collections, including the library and the archive. The Einsatzkommando 16 established a prison for local Polish activists, teachers and priests at the seminary, and the victims were later either murdered in the Szpęgawski Forest, deported to concentration camps, or moved to the prison in Starogard Gdański. In 1940 the Germans shortly operated a subcamp of the Stutthof concentration camp in the town. The local Polish police chief, another policeman and a school teacher from Pelplin were murdered by the Russians in the Katyn massacre in 1940.

In the final stages of the war Pelplin was captured by the Red Army. After the end of war Pelplin became part of People's Republic of Poland.

== Transport ==
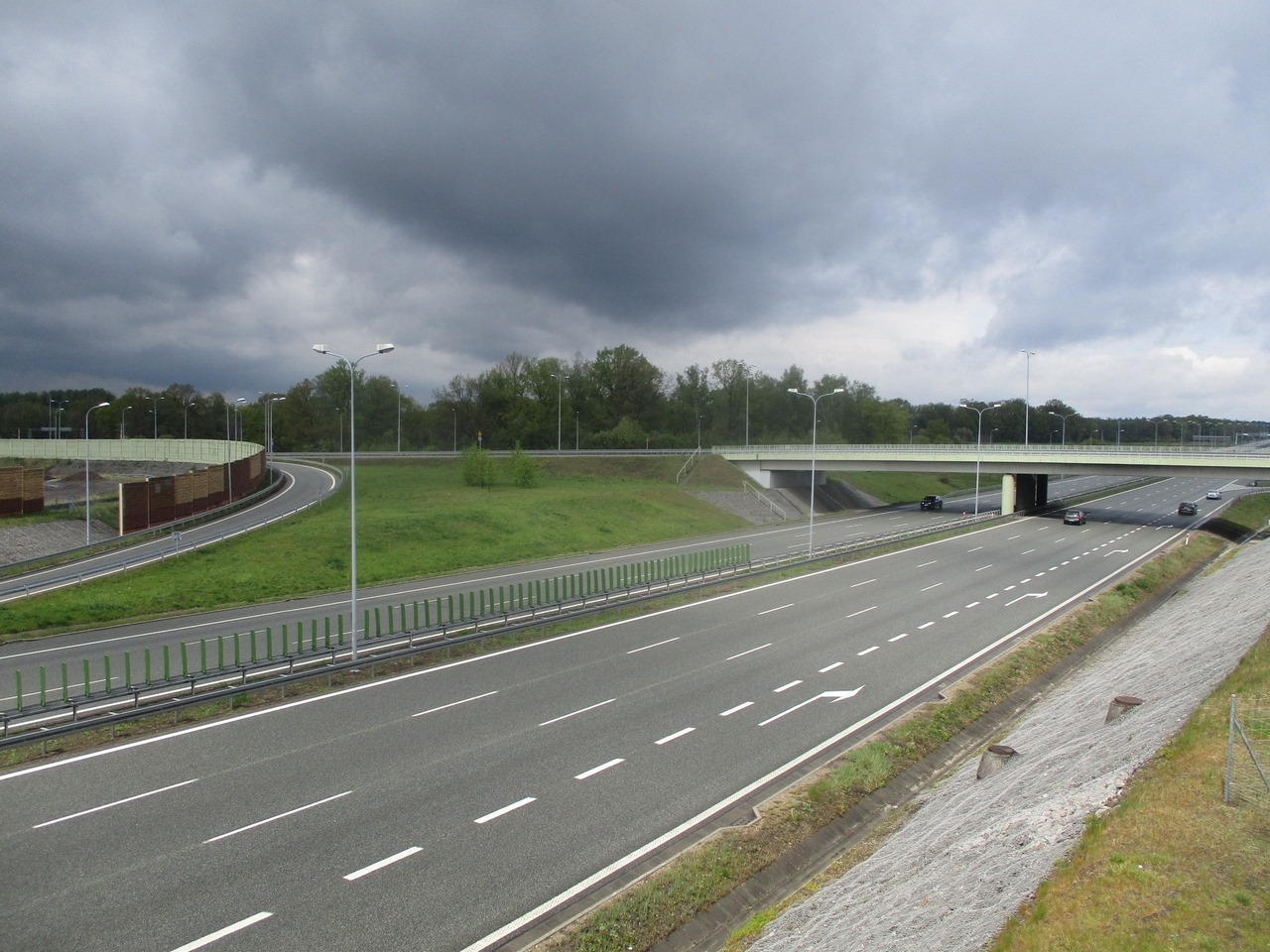
Pelplin interchange on the A1 highway

The A1 motorway bypasses Pelplin to the west. Pelplin exit provides for quick access to Gdańsk to the north and to Łódź.

Voivodeship roads 230 and 229 form a bypass around the town.

Pelplin has a station on the Gdańsk-Bydgoszcz railway line.

== Demographics ==
Historical population
Year	Pop.	±%
1931	4,185	—
1939	4,218	+0.8%
1950	4,910	+16.4%
1960	5,499	+12.0%
2010	8,244	+49.9%

== Sports ==
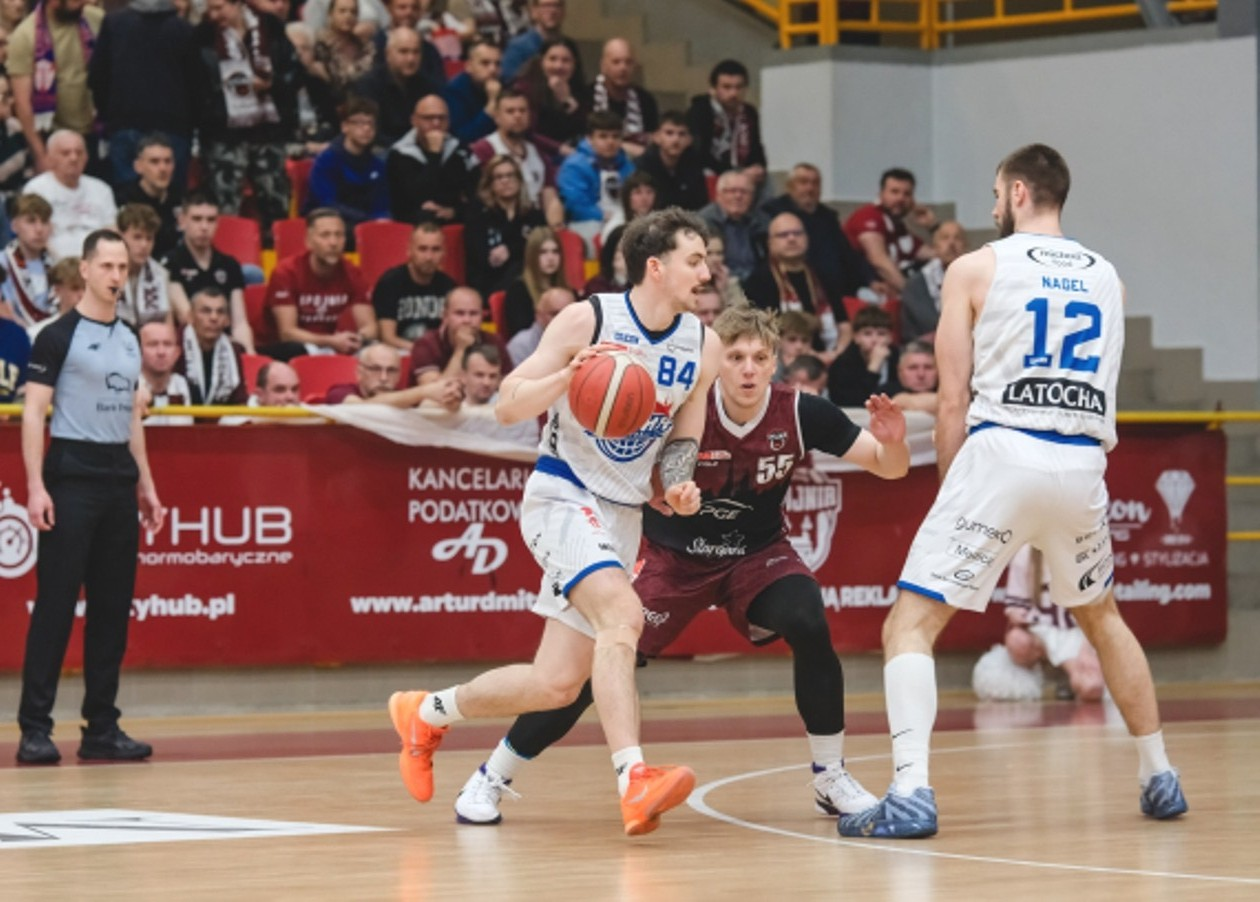
Away game of Decka Pelplin with Spójnia Stargard in the I Liga in 2026

The leading sports club of Pelplin is basketball club Decka Pelplin, which competes in the I Liga (as of 2025–26).

The town also has two football teams KS Wierzyca Pelplin and KS Centrum Pelplin, both of which compete in the lower leagues.

== Notable people ==
- Andrzej Liss (1950–2019), Polish politician, elected to the Sejm in 2005

== International relations ==
Pelplin is twinned with:

- Gniew, Poland
- Teisnach, Germany
- Grafling, Germany
- Alsónémedi, Hungary

== Gallery ==
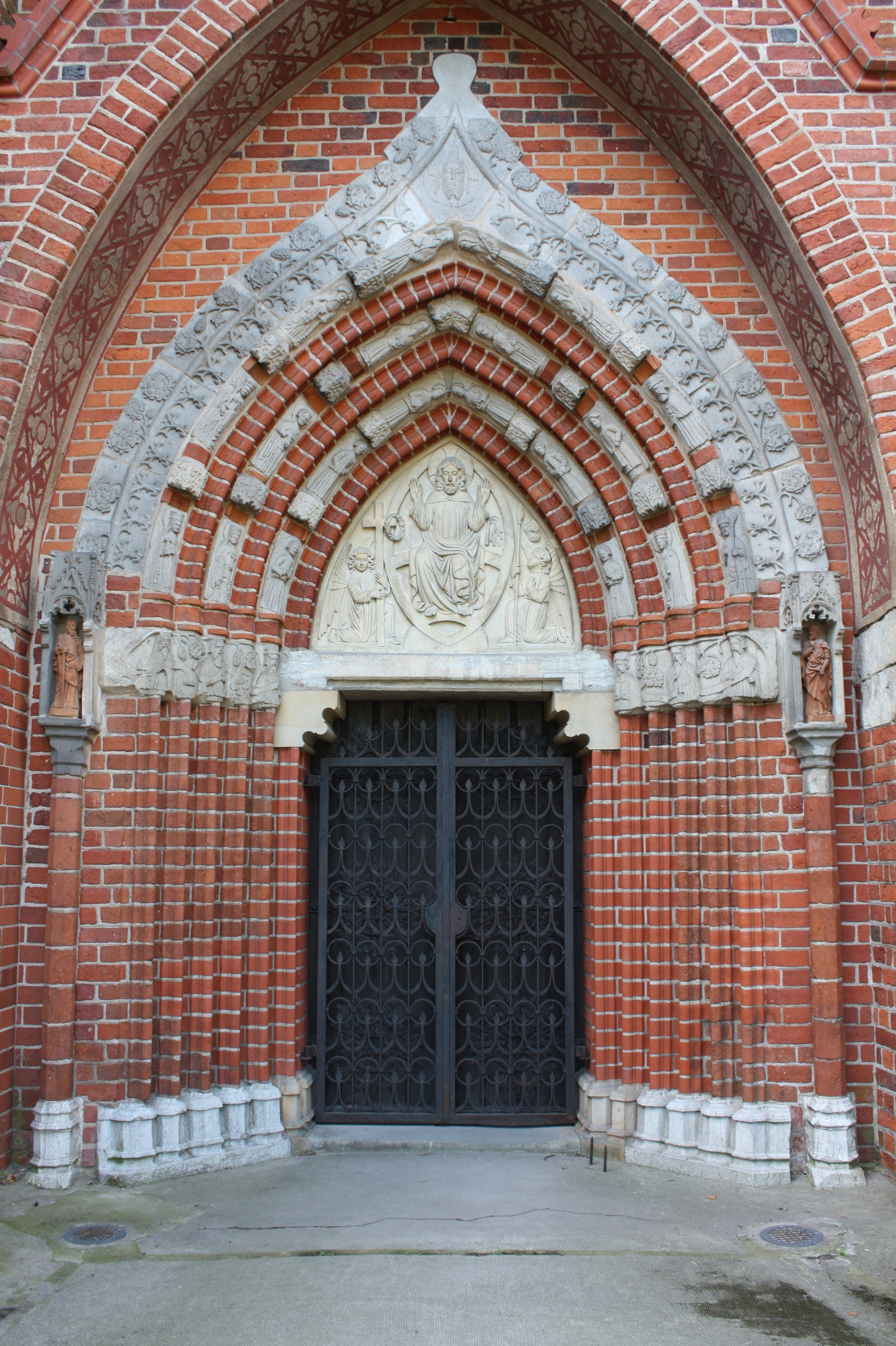
Gothic portal of the Pelplin Cathedral

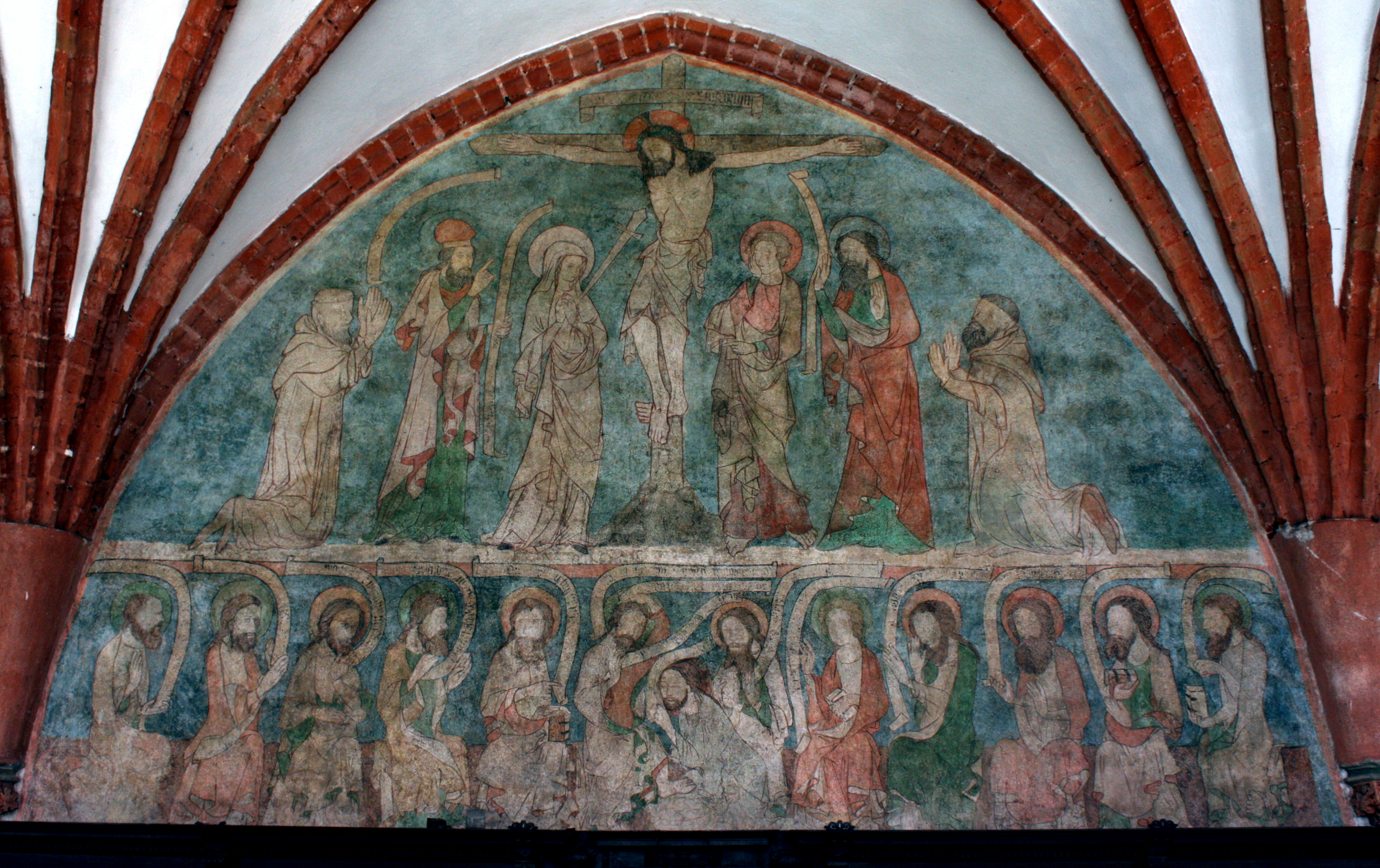
Mural painting in the abbey

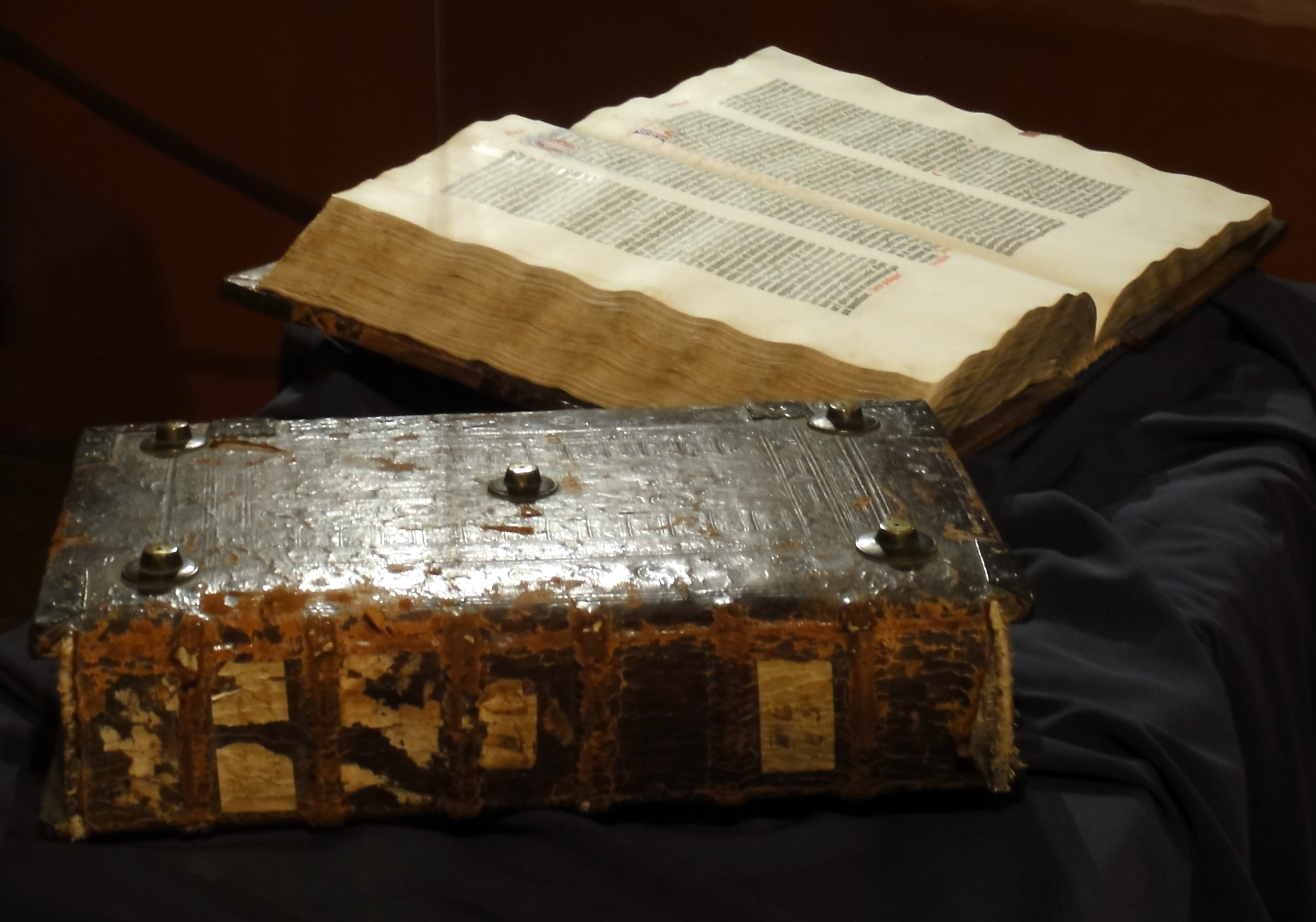
Gutenberg Bible at the Diocesan Museum in Pelplin

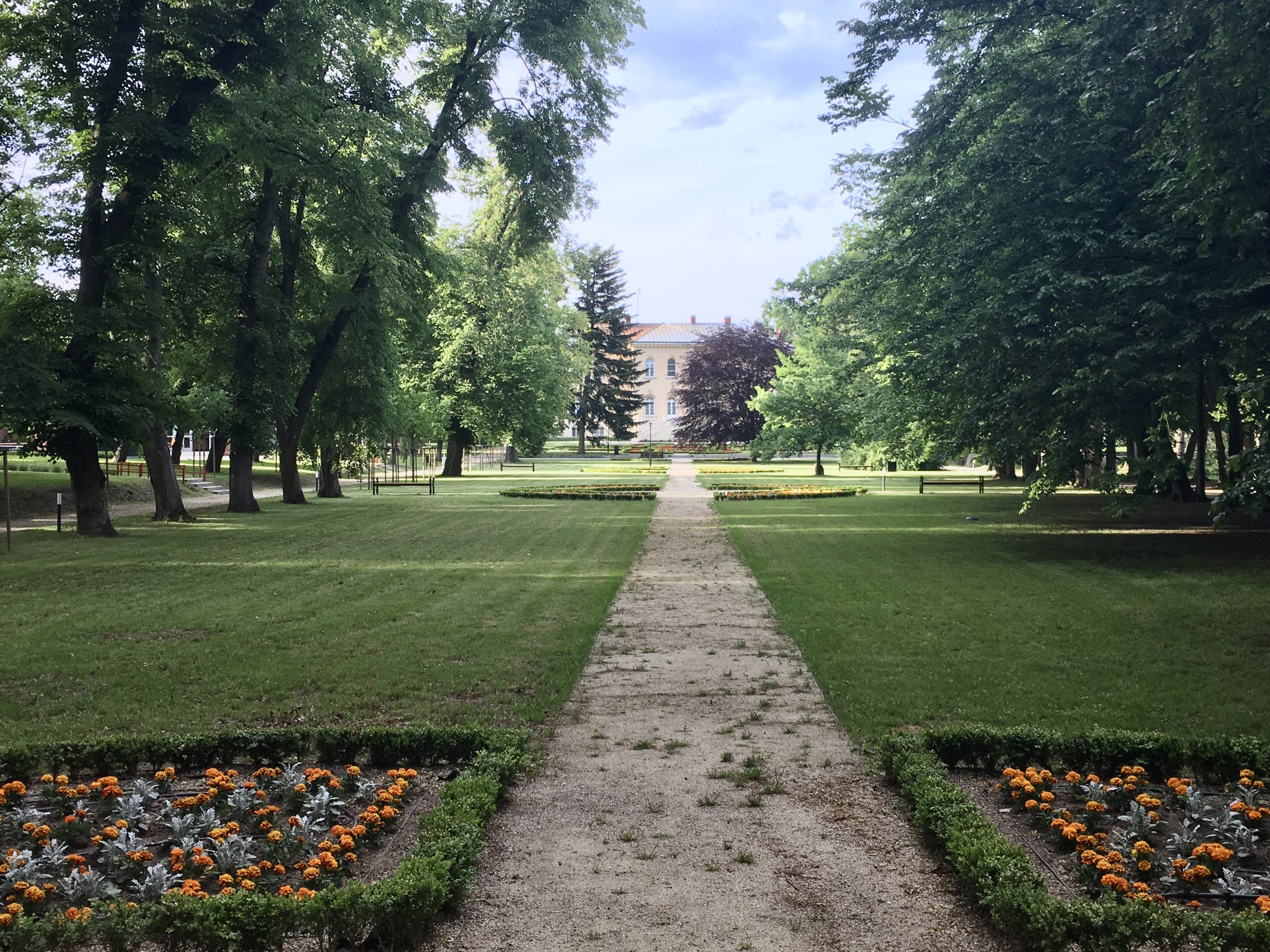
Park

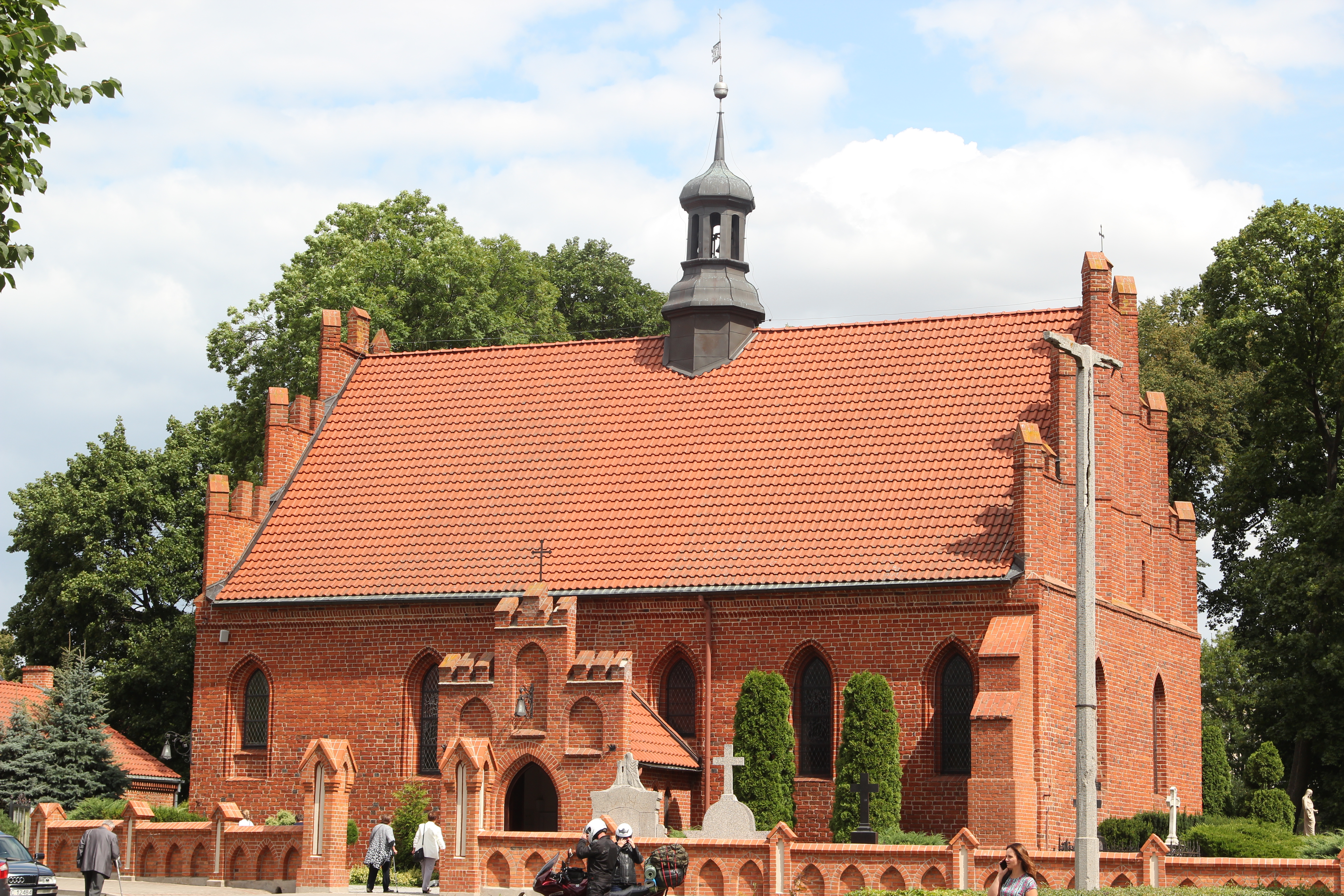
Gothic Corpus Christi church

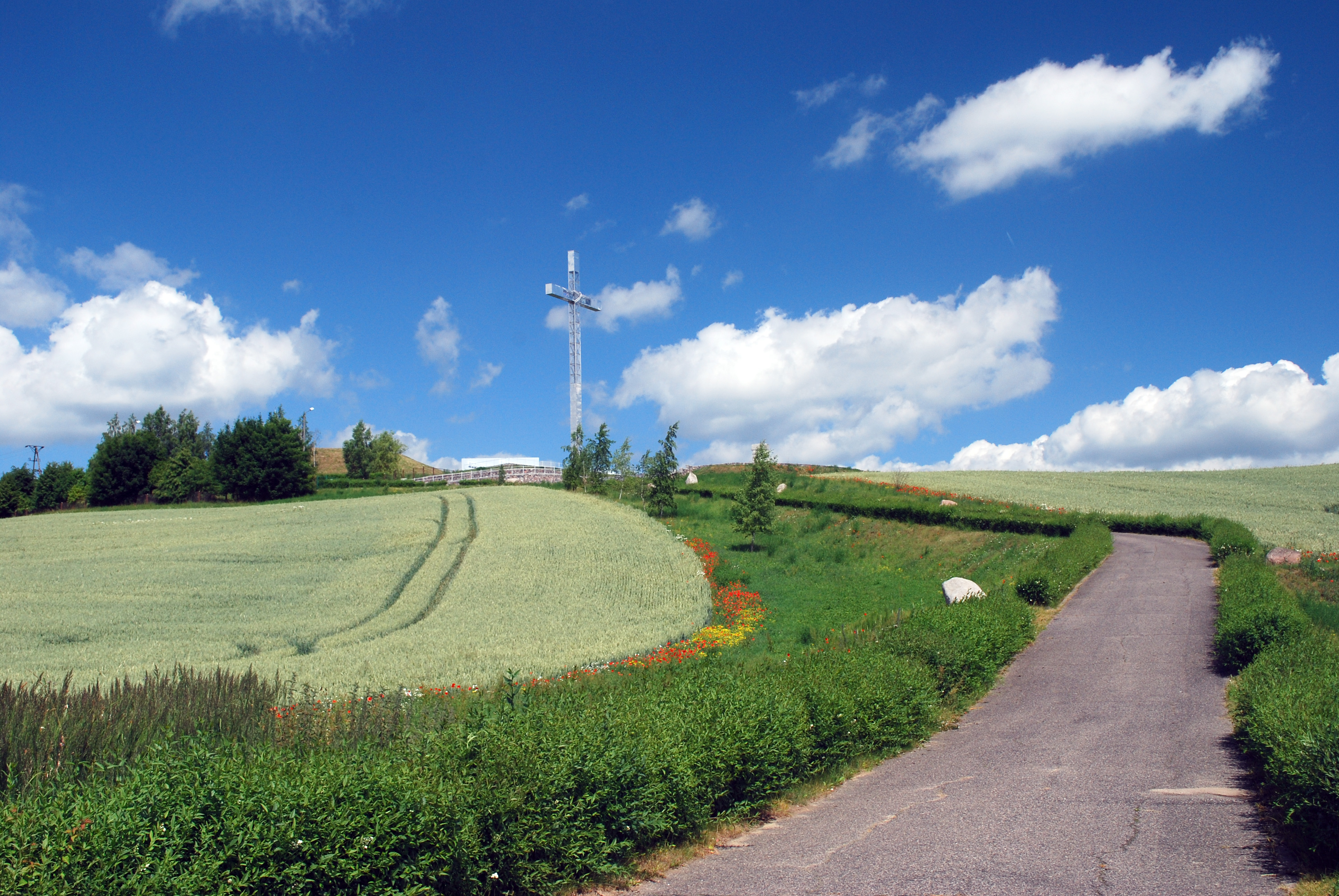
Wzgórze Jana Pawła II (John Paul II Hill)
