= Cathedral Basilica of the Assumption, Pelplin =

Pelplin Cathedral
- Cathedral Basilica of the Assumption
- Bazylika katedralna Wniebowzięcia Najświętszej Maryi Panny
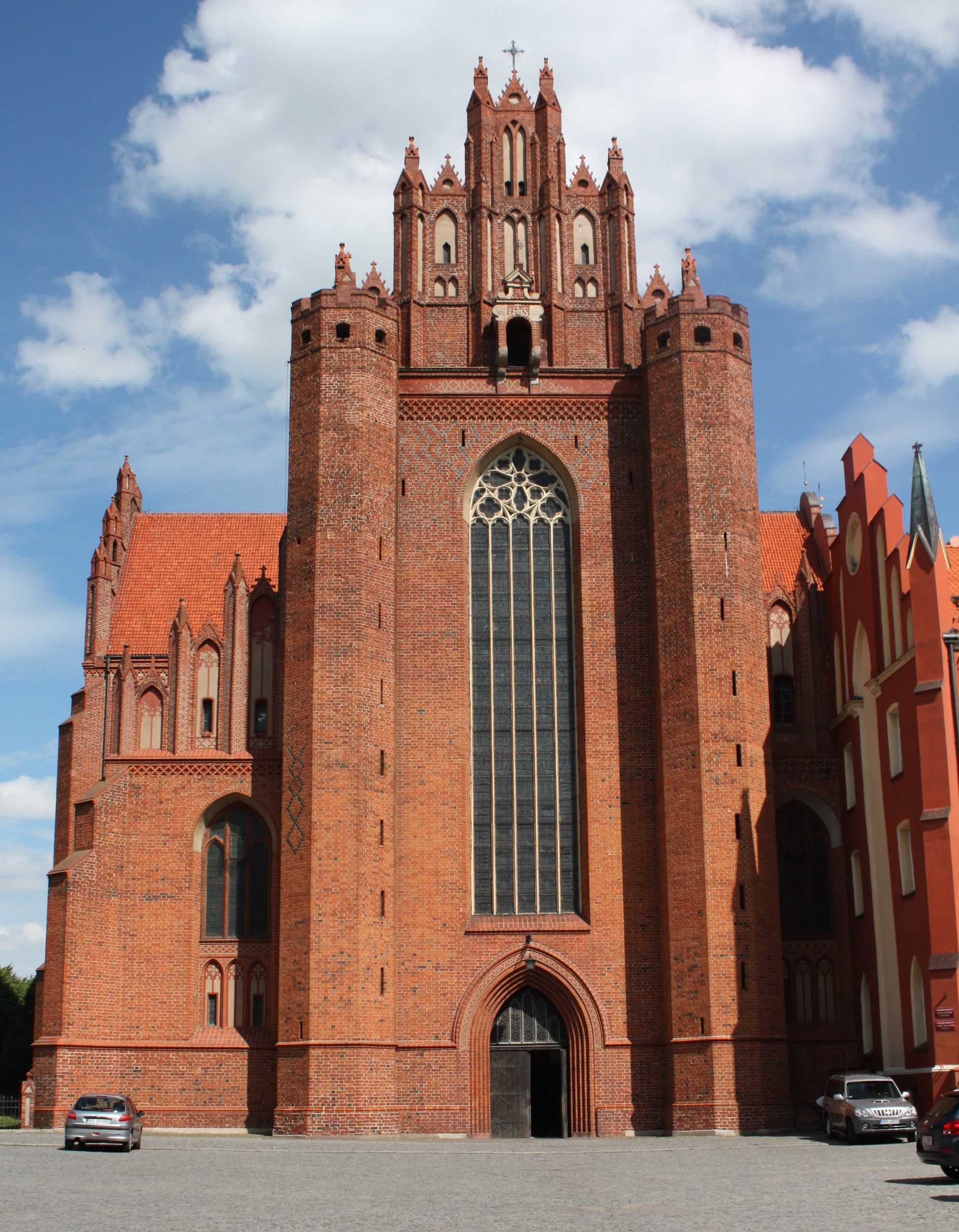
- Façade

- 53°56′00″N 18°42′00″E
- Location: Pelplin
- Country: Poland
- Language: Polish
- Denomination: Catholic

History
- Status: Cathedral
- Founded: 14th century
- Dedication: Assumption of Mary

Architecture
- Functional status: Active
- Heritage designation: Historic Monument of Poland
- Designated: 23 April 2014
- Style: Gothic
- Completed: 15th century

Administration
- Diocese: Pelplin

Clergy
- Bishop: Ryszard Kasyna

The Cathedral Basilica of the Assumption (Polish: Bazylika katedralna Wniebowzięcia Najświętszej Maryi Panny, German: Kloster Pelplin) is a Gothic cathedral located in Pelplin, Poland, one of the country's largest medieval churches. A former church of the Cistercian Pelplin Abbey, it is the seat of the Roman Catholic Diocese of Pelplin. It is listed as a Historic Monument of Poland.

== History ==
The Pelplin Abbey was founded in 1258 by Sambor II, Duke of Pomerania, as "Samboria", and was a daughter house of the Cistercian Doberan Abbey. It was first located in Pogódki near Kościerzyna and re-located in 1276 to Pelplin. Following the Partitions of Poland, by decree of the Prussian government of 5 March 1823 the abbey was dissolved. Since 1824 the church has been the cathedral of the Roman Catholic Diocese of Chełmno, and after its dissolution in 1992, it became the seat of the Roman Catholic Diocese of Pelplin.

== Main building ==
Work on the Brick Gothic building (length 80 m, height 26 m) began in 1289. The church was finished in 1323; additional work was completed in 1557. Currently, it is one of the largest church buildings in Poland. The cathedral is known as an impressive early example of Brick Gothic architecture. In Pelpin, the architecture has also been influenced by Cistercian tradition.

== Gallery ==
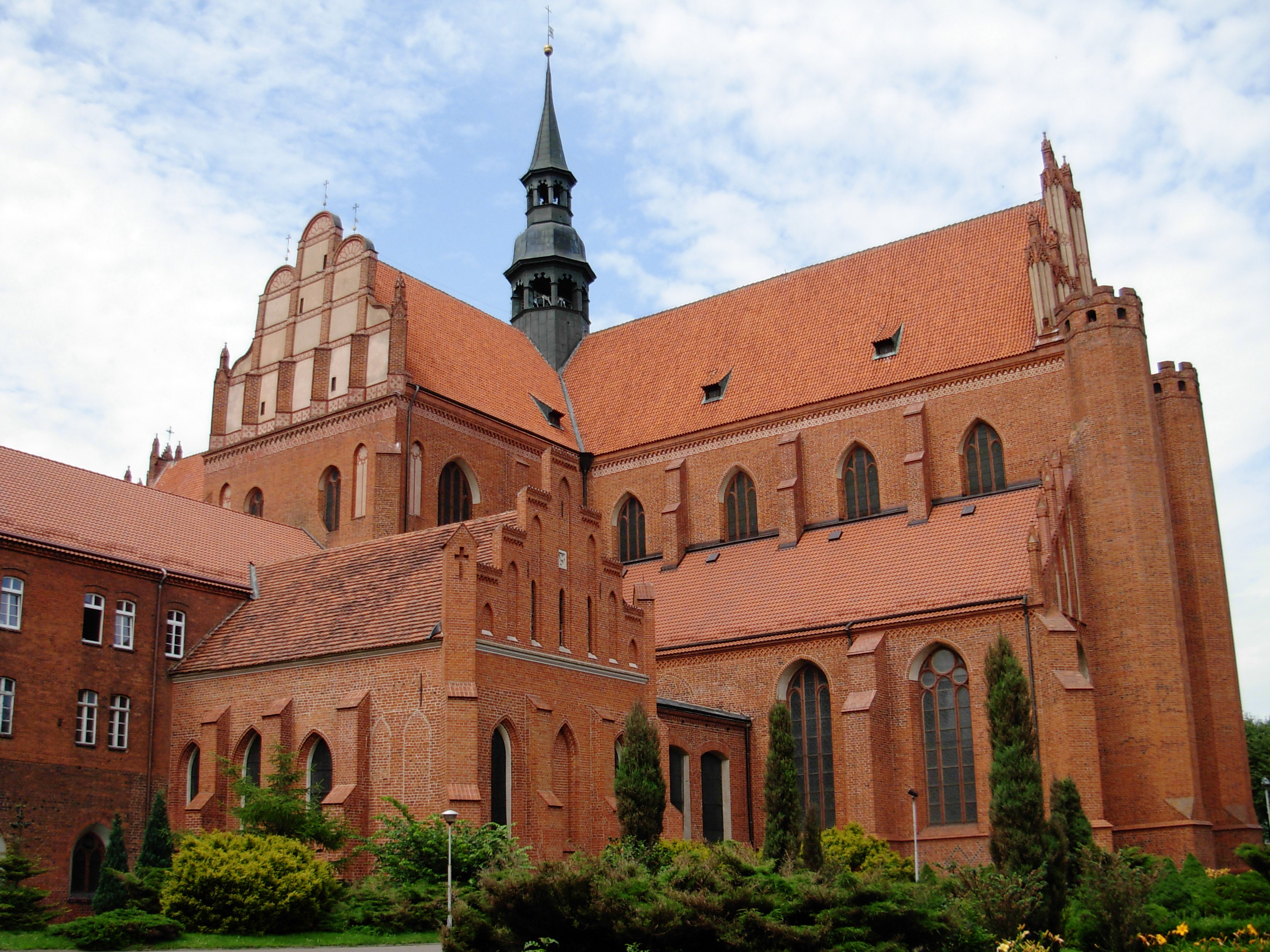
View of the Cathedral from the south-east

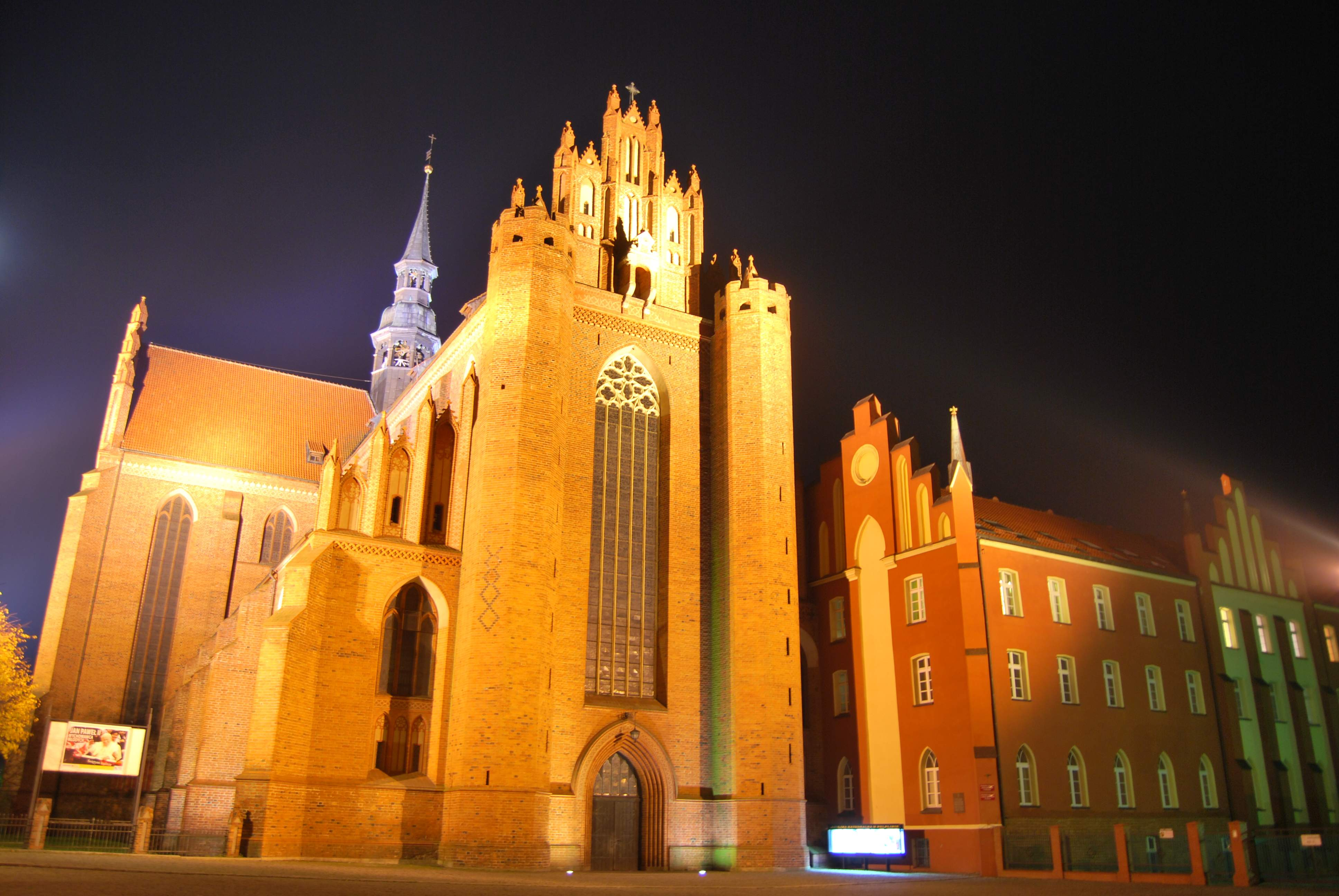
Cathedral at night

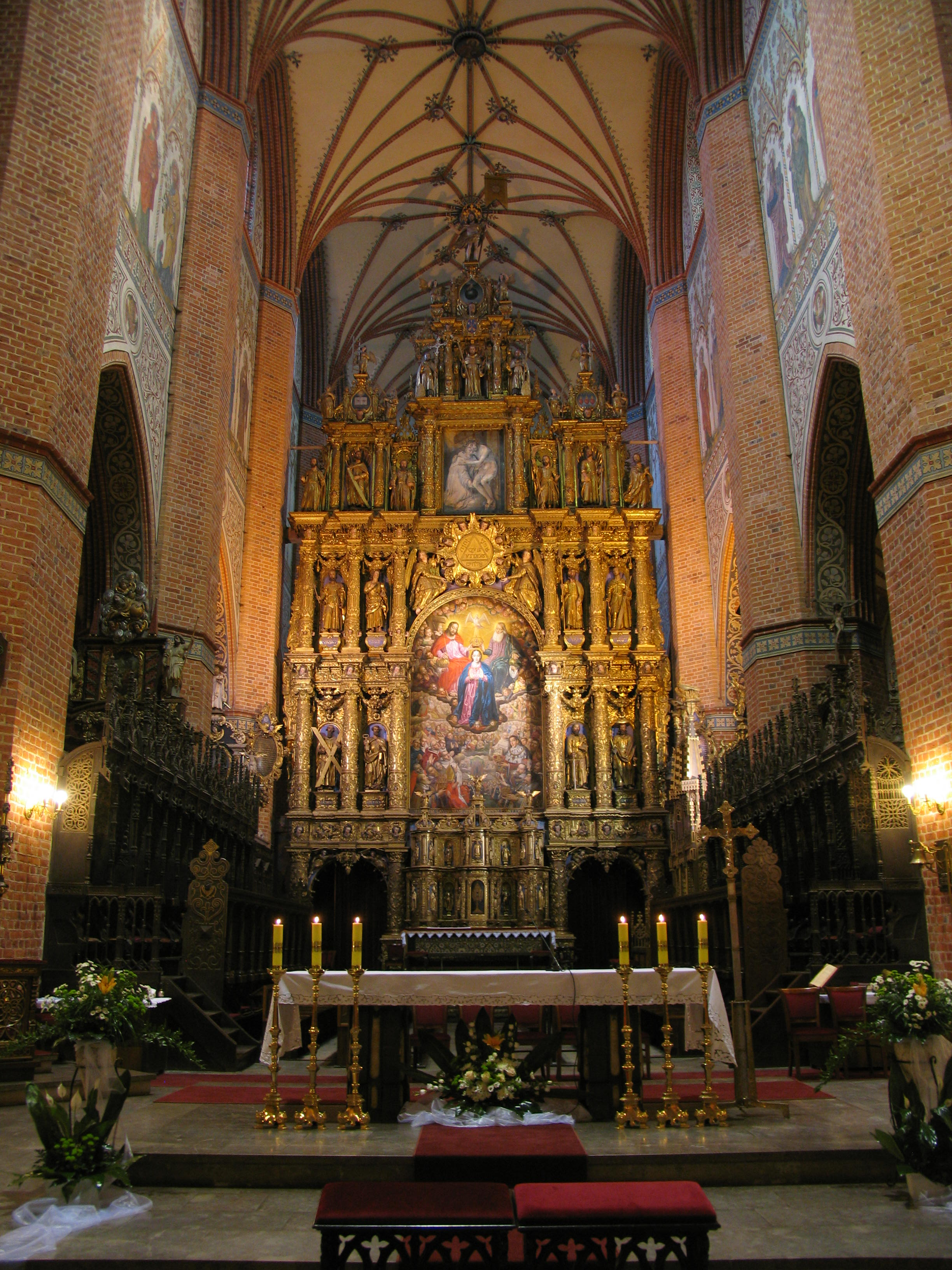
Main altar

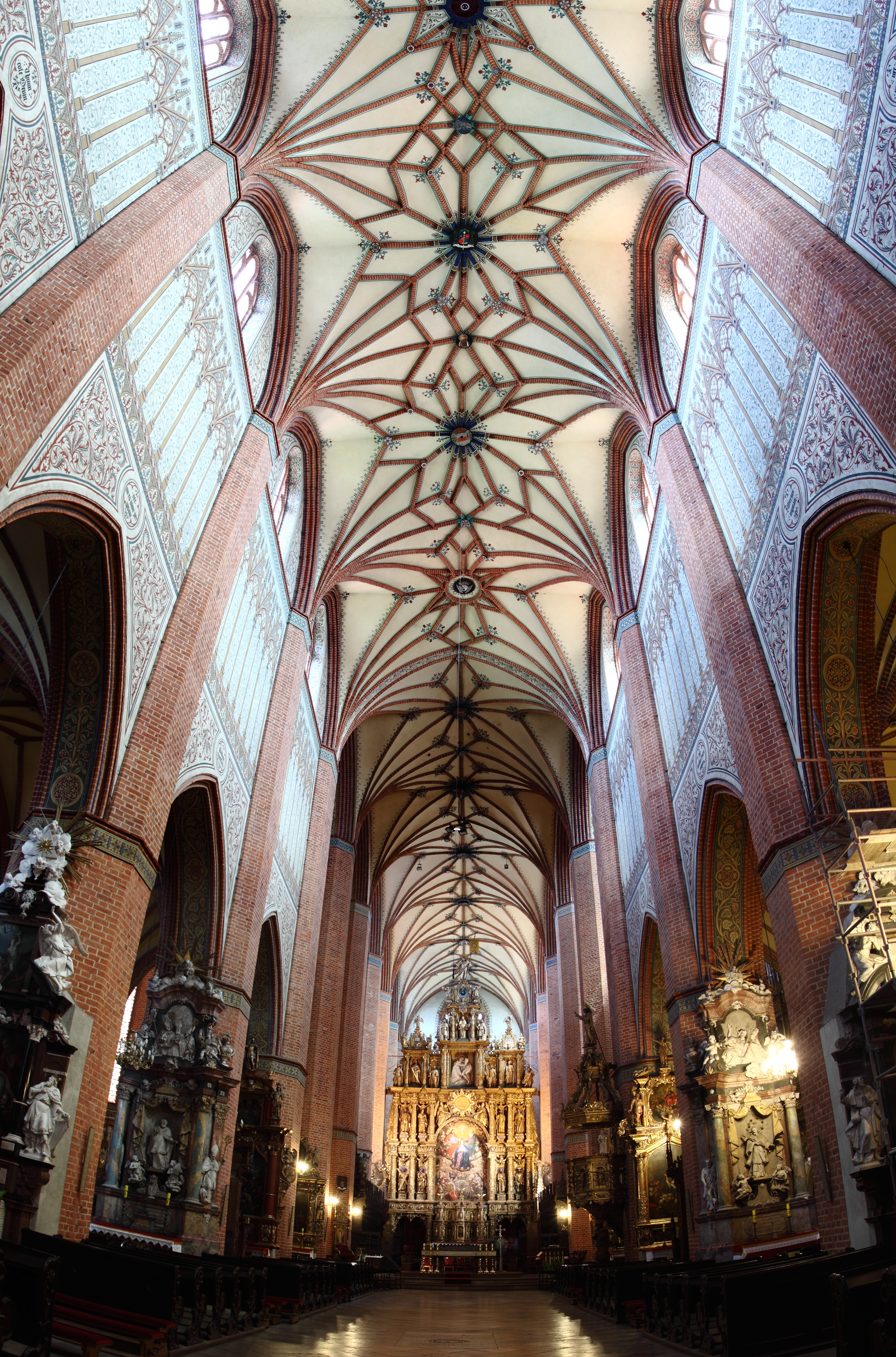
Main nave

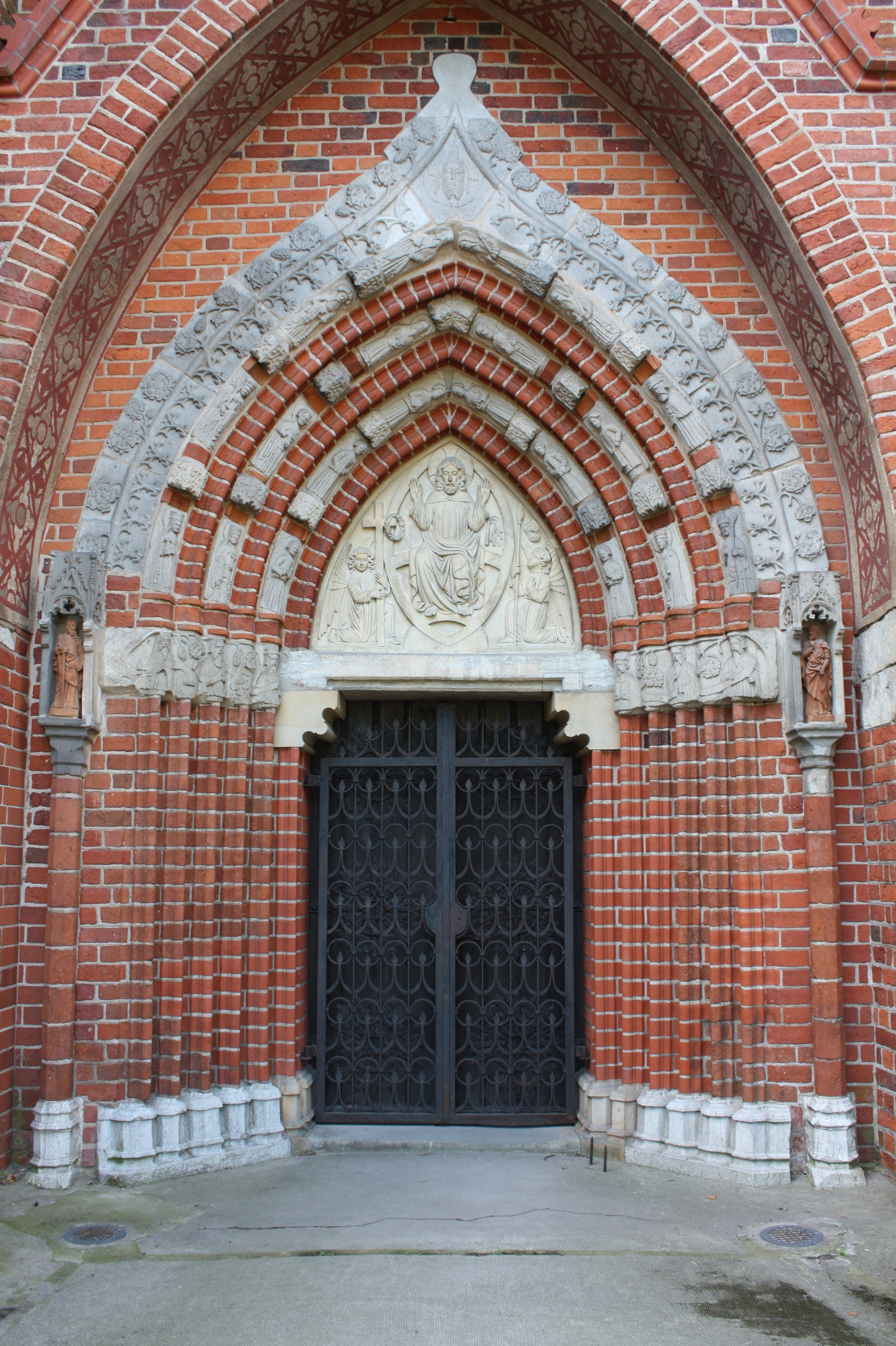
A Gothic portal

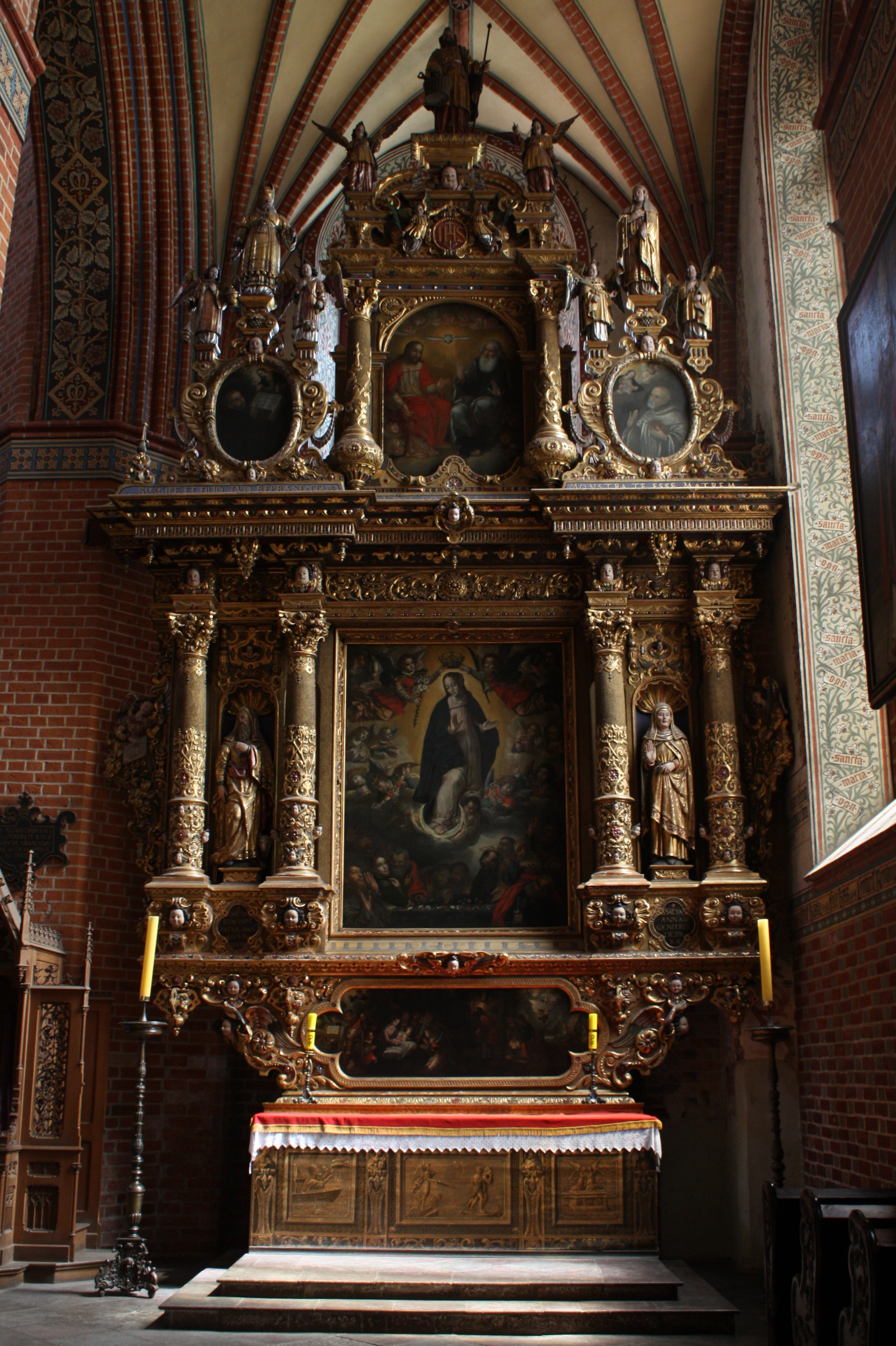
An altar with painting by Herman Hann

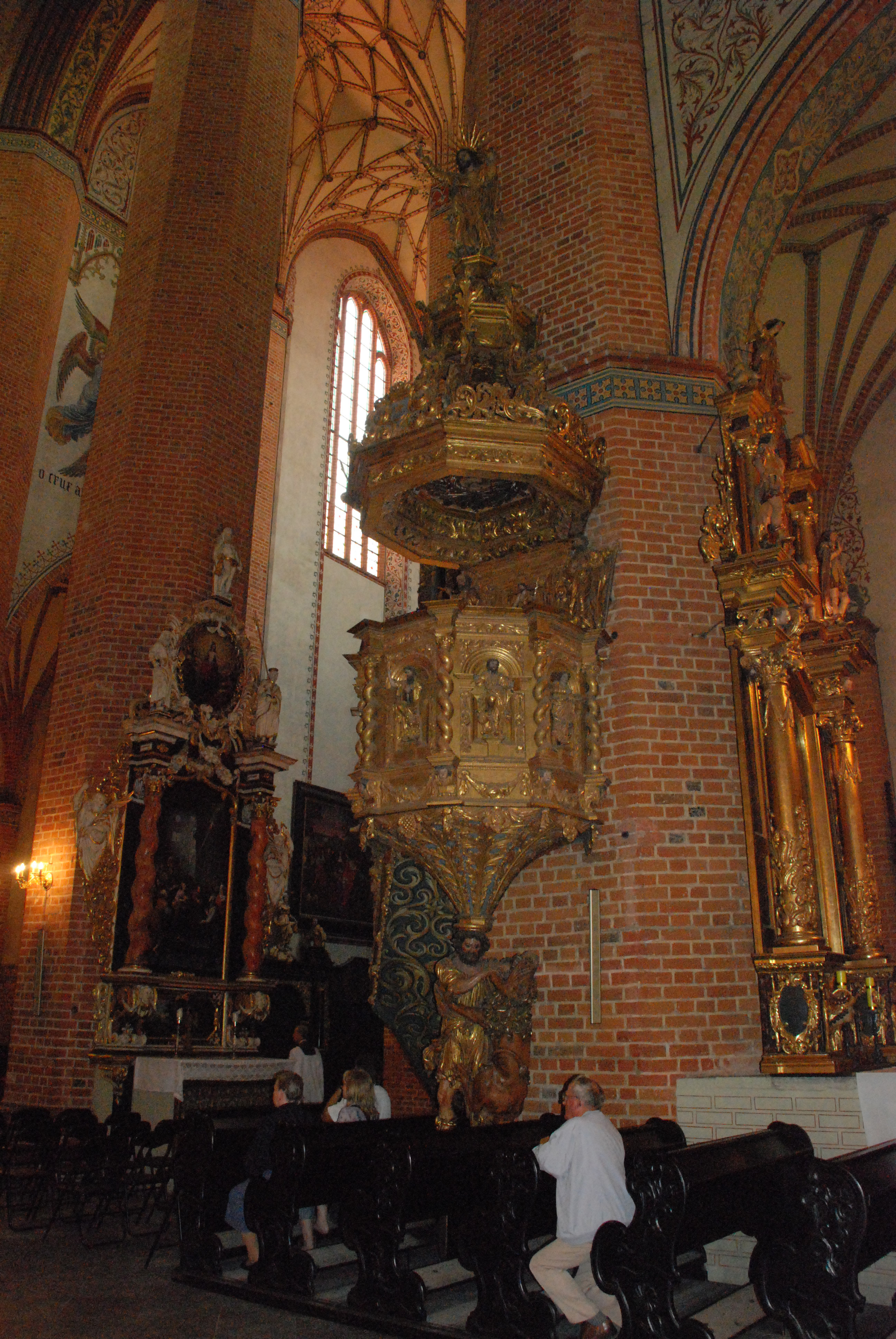
A Baroque pulpit

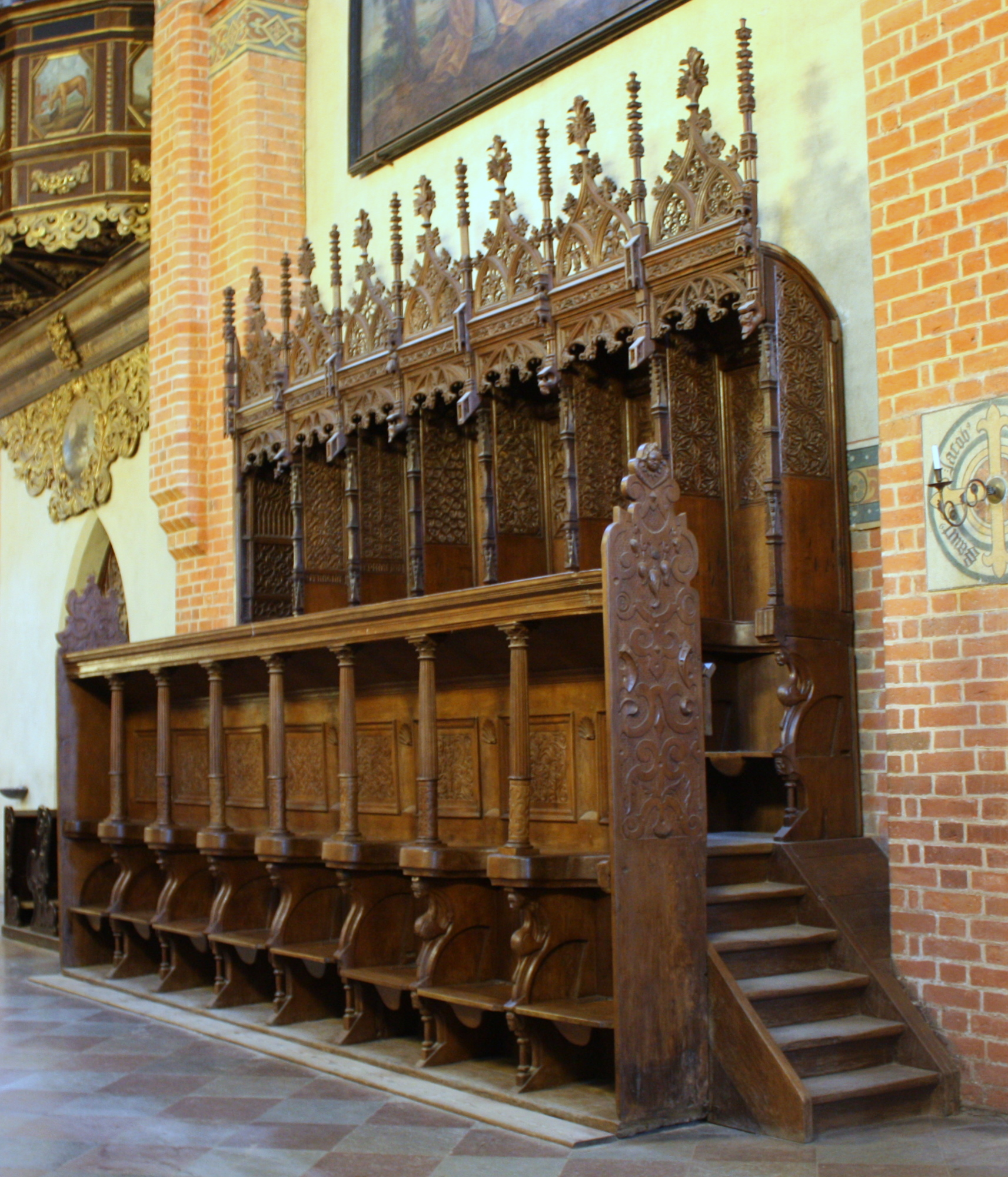
Late-Gothic choir stalls

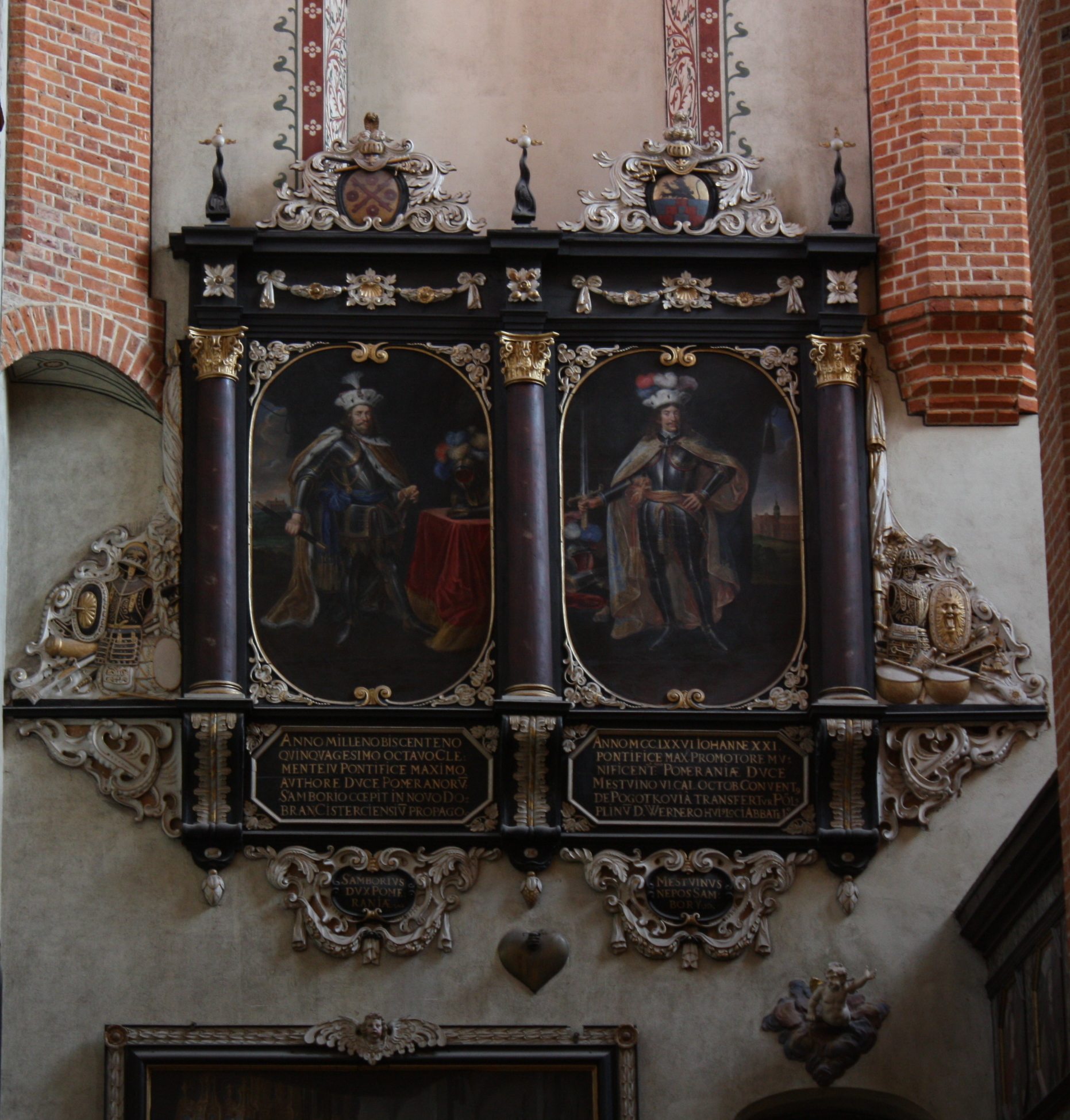
Paintings in the interior of the cathedral

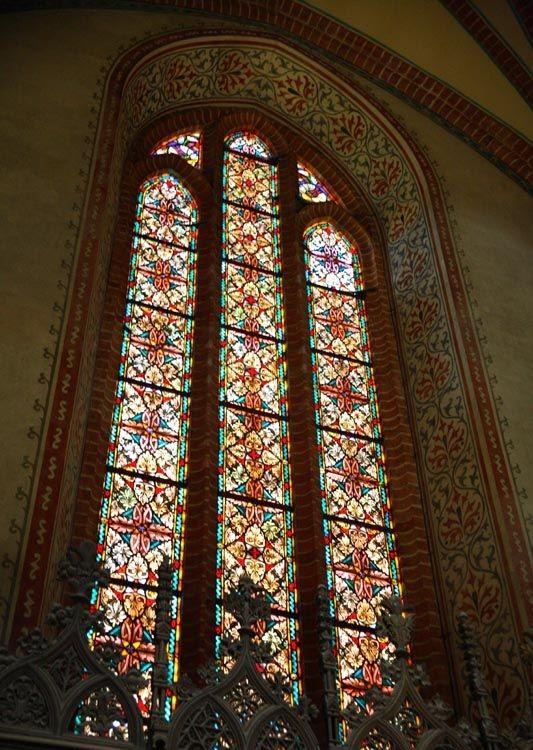
Gothic stained-glass window

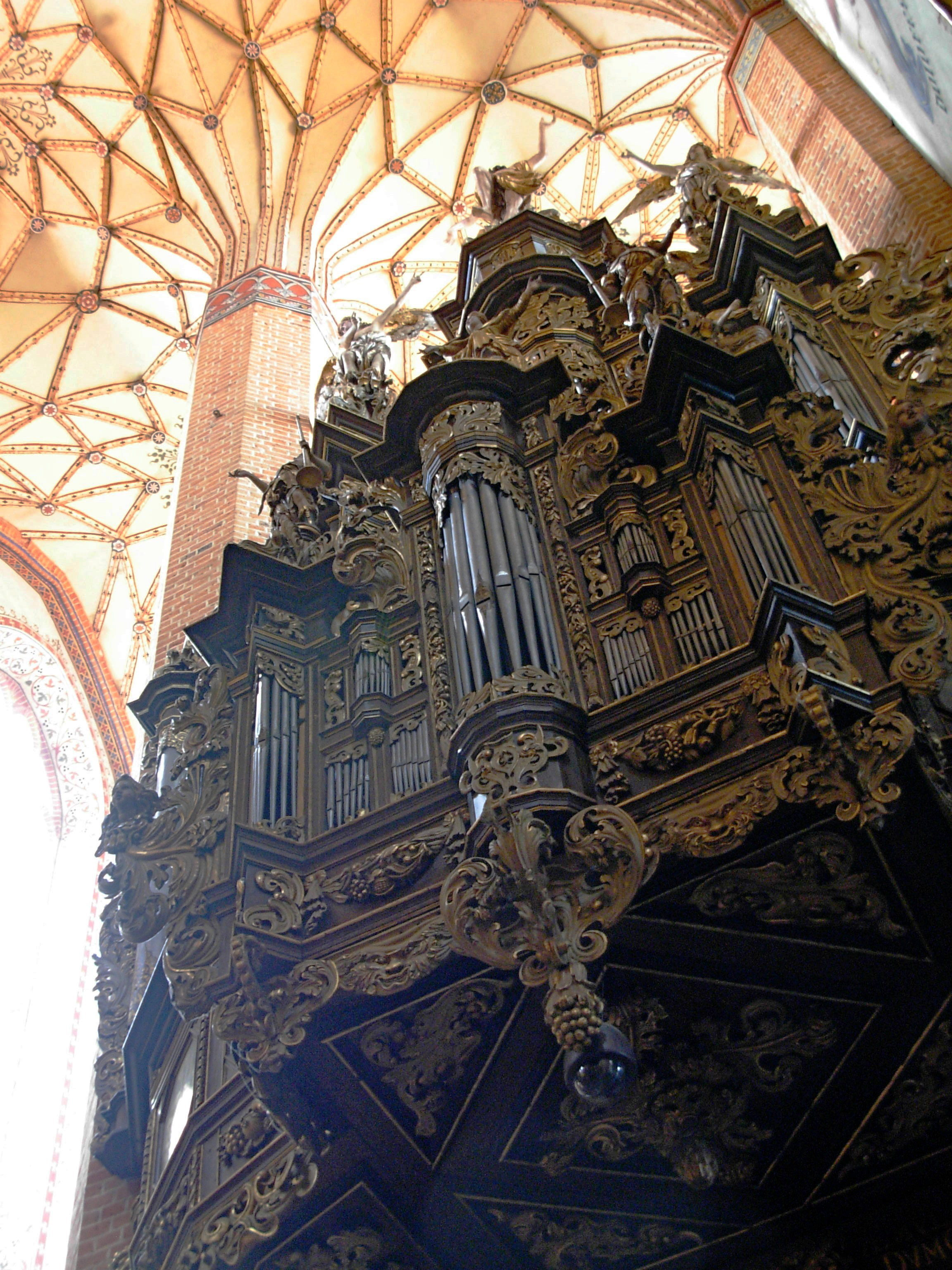
Pipe organs

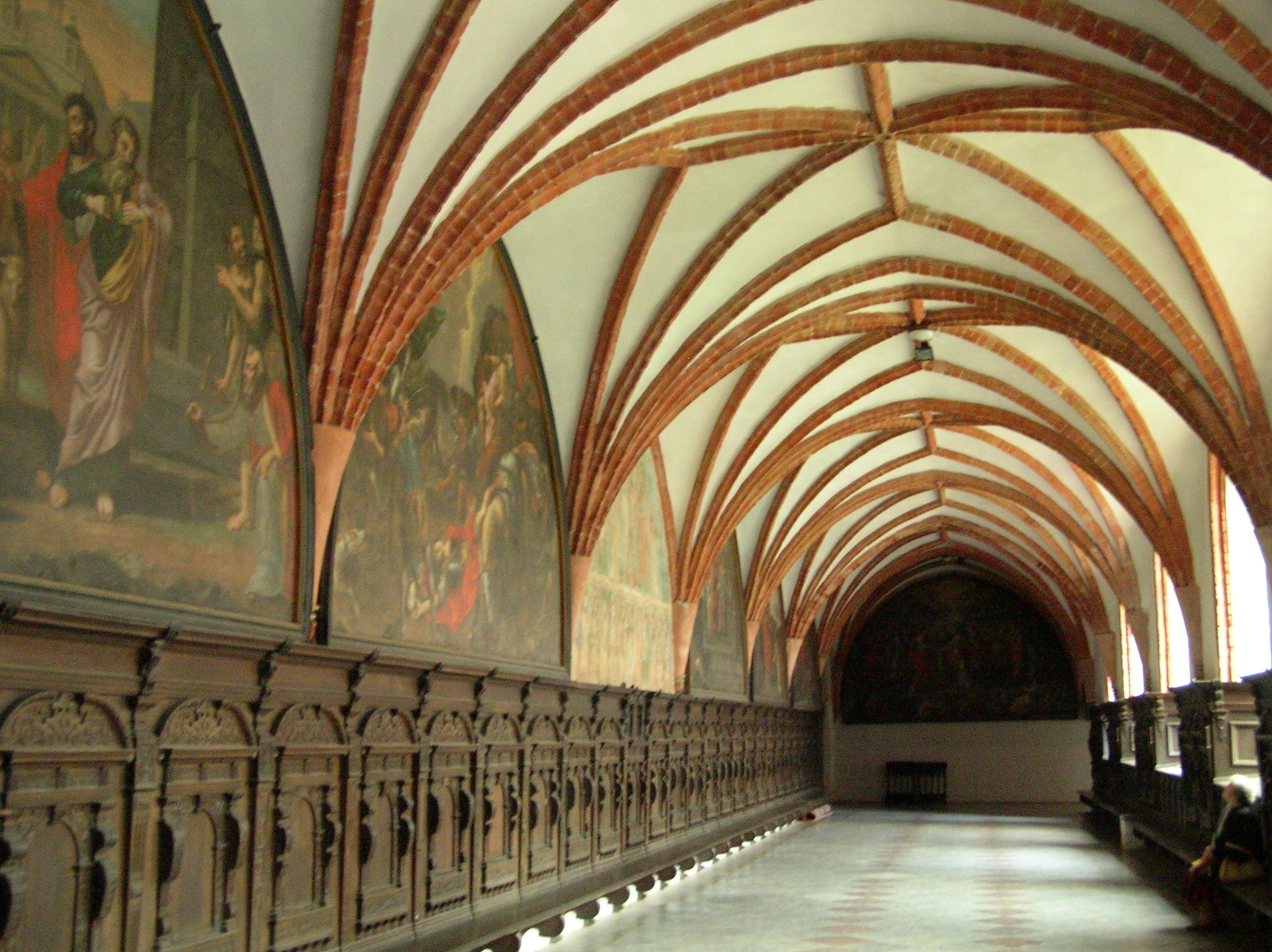
A corridor inside the abbey

== Bibliography ==
- Antoni, Michael, 1993: Dehio-Handbuch der Kunstdenkmäler, West- und Ostpreußen, pp. 469–473 (with plan). Munich and Berlin: Deutscher Kunstverlag. ISBN 3-422-03025-5
- Binding, Günther, Untermann, Matthias, 2001: Kleine Kunstgeschichte der mittelalterlichen Ordensbaukunst in Deutschland, 3rd edn., p. 222 (with plan). Darmstadt: Wissenschaftliche Buchgesellschaft Darmstadt. No ISBN
- Dehio, Georg, 1922: Handbuch der Deutschen Kunstdenkmäler, Zweiter Band Nordostdeutschland, 2nd edn., pp 362 ff. (edited by Julius Kohte). Berlin: Ernst Wasmuth A.G.
- Faryna-Paszkiewicz, Hanna; Omilanowska, Małgorzata; Pasieczny, Robert, 2001: Atlas zabytków architektury w Polsce, p. 44. Warsaw: Wydawnictwo Naukowe PWN. ISBN 83-01-13478-X
- Pasierb, Janusz, 1993: Der Pelpliner Dom, Pelplin Diözesanverlag. No ISBN
- Schneider, Ambrosius, 1986: Lexikale Übersicht der Männerklöster der Cistercienser im deutschen Sprach- und Kulturraum, in: Schneider, Ambrosius; Wienand, Adam; Bickel, Wolfgang; Coester, Ernst (eds.): Die Cistercienser, Geschichte – Geist – Kunst, 3rd edn., p. 683. Cologne: Wienand Verlag. ISBN 3-87909-132-3
