= Church of Saint Mary, Queen of Poland in Lębork =

- Kościół Najświętszej Maryi Panny Królowej Polski w Lęborku
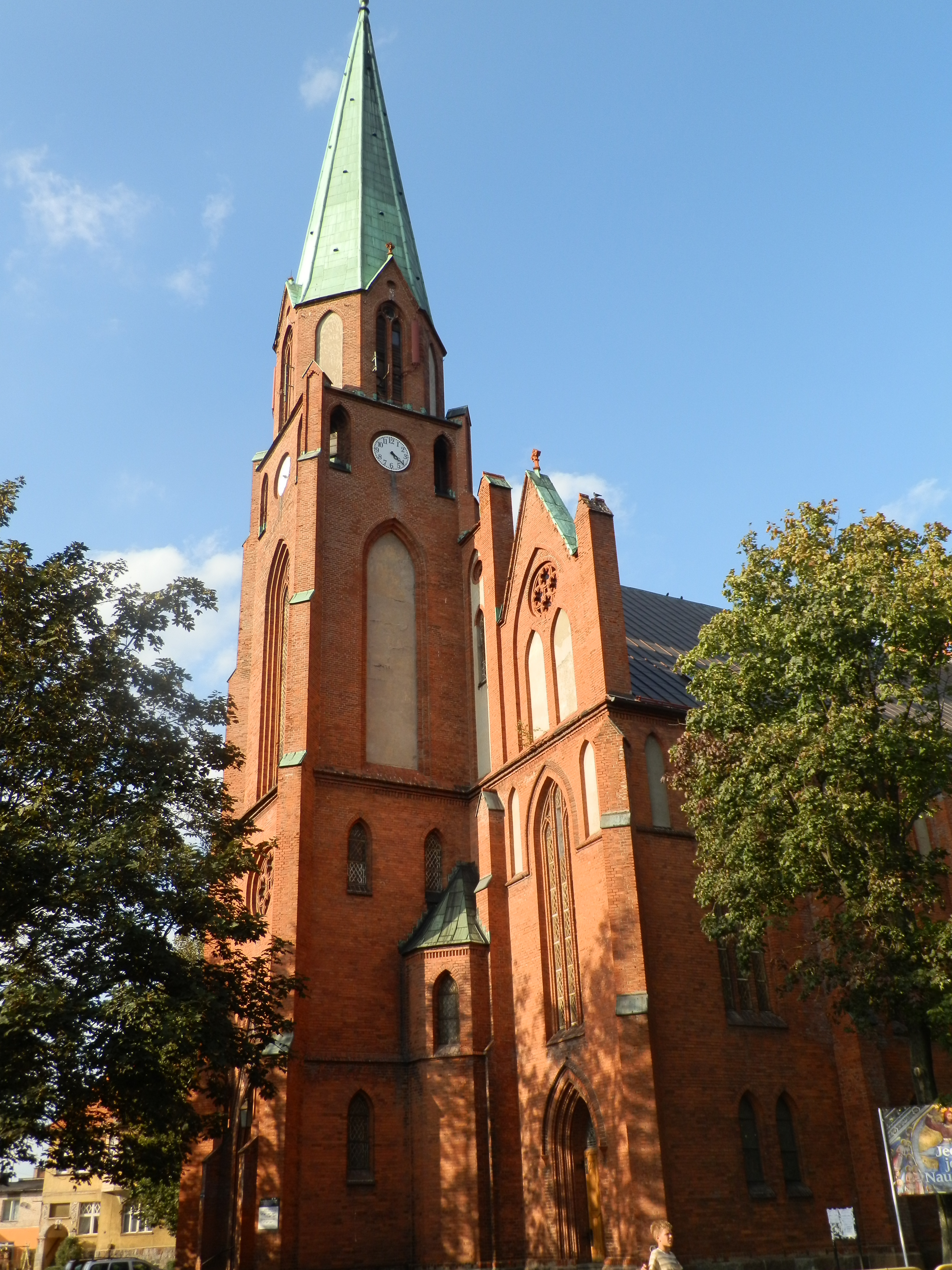

- 54.545092°N 17.747711°E
- Location: Lębork, Poland
- Address: Plac Kopernika 6, 84-300 Lębork
- Denomination: Catholic
- Previous denomination: Protestant
- Website: https://www.korona.lebork.pl/

Architecture
- Style: Neo-Gothic

Specifications
- Materials: Bricks

Administration
- Diocese: Diocese of Pelplin
- Parish: Parish of Saint Mary, Queen of Poland in Lębork

Church of Saint Mary, Queen of Poland in Lębork, also referred to as "Korona" is a Roman Catholic parish church located in the Polish town of Lębork that belongs to the Lębork decanate of the Diocese of Pelplin.

== History ==
The church was built in the Neo-gothic architectural style in 1866. It was a Protestant church until the year 1946. Starting from 1958, it is the parish church of the Parish of Saint Mary, Queen of Poland in Lębork

== Gallery ==
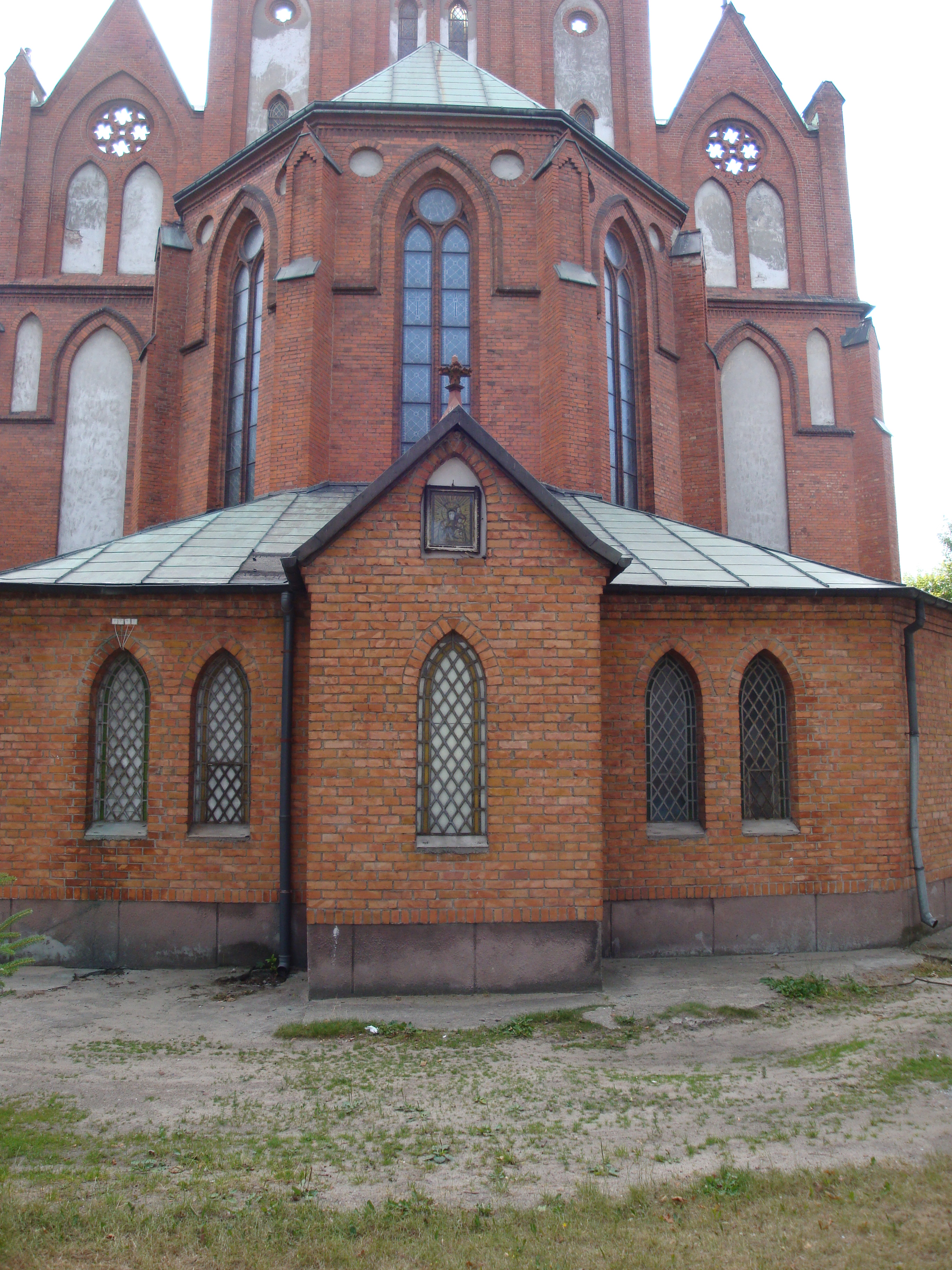
Back of the building

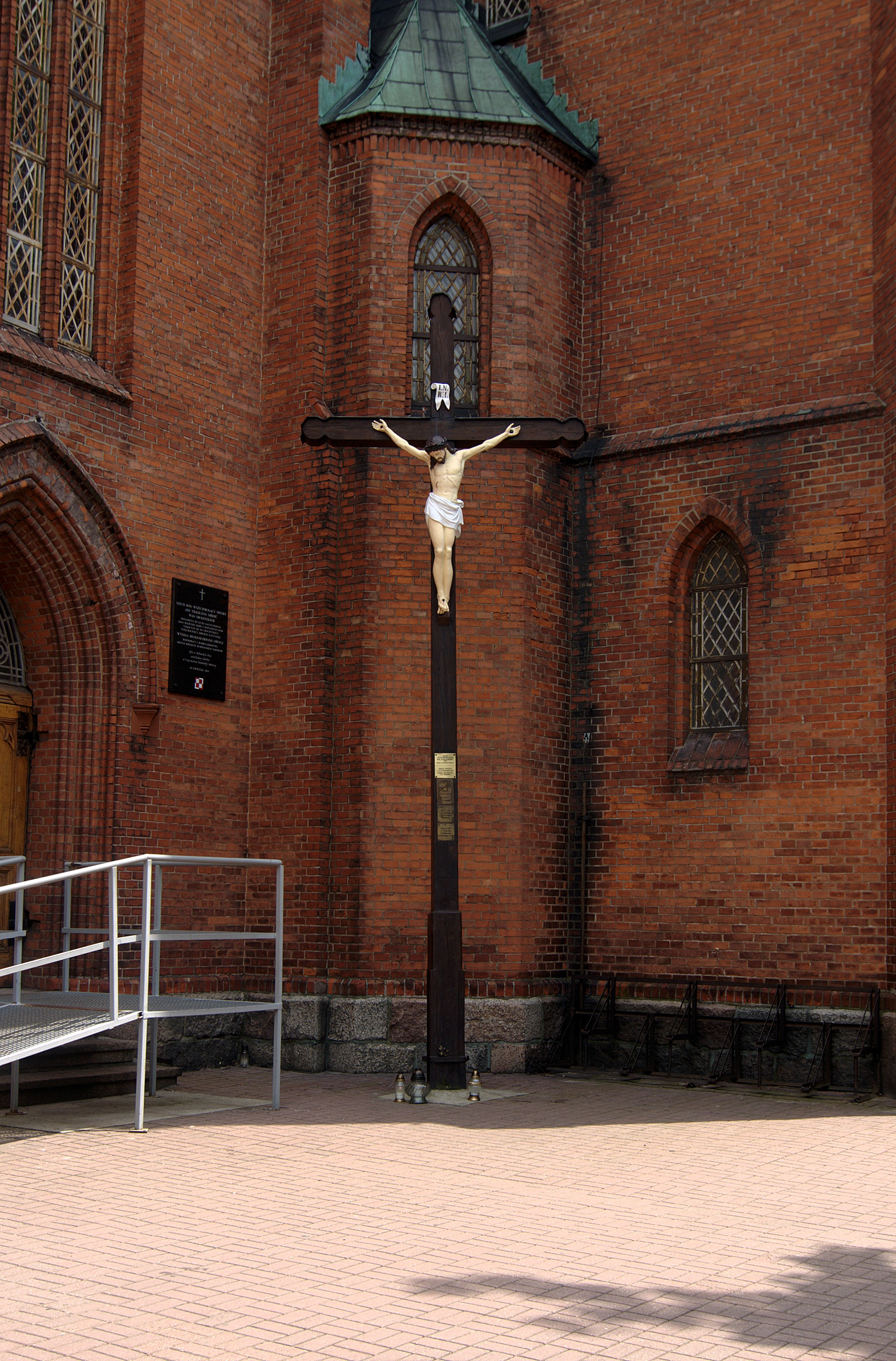
Cross near the church

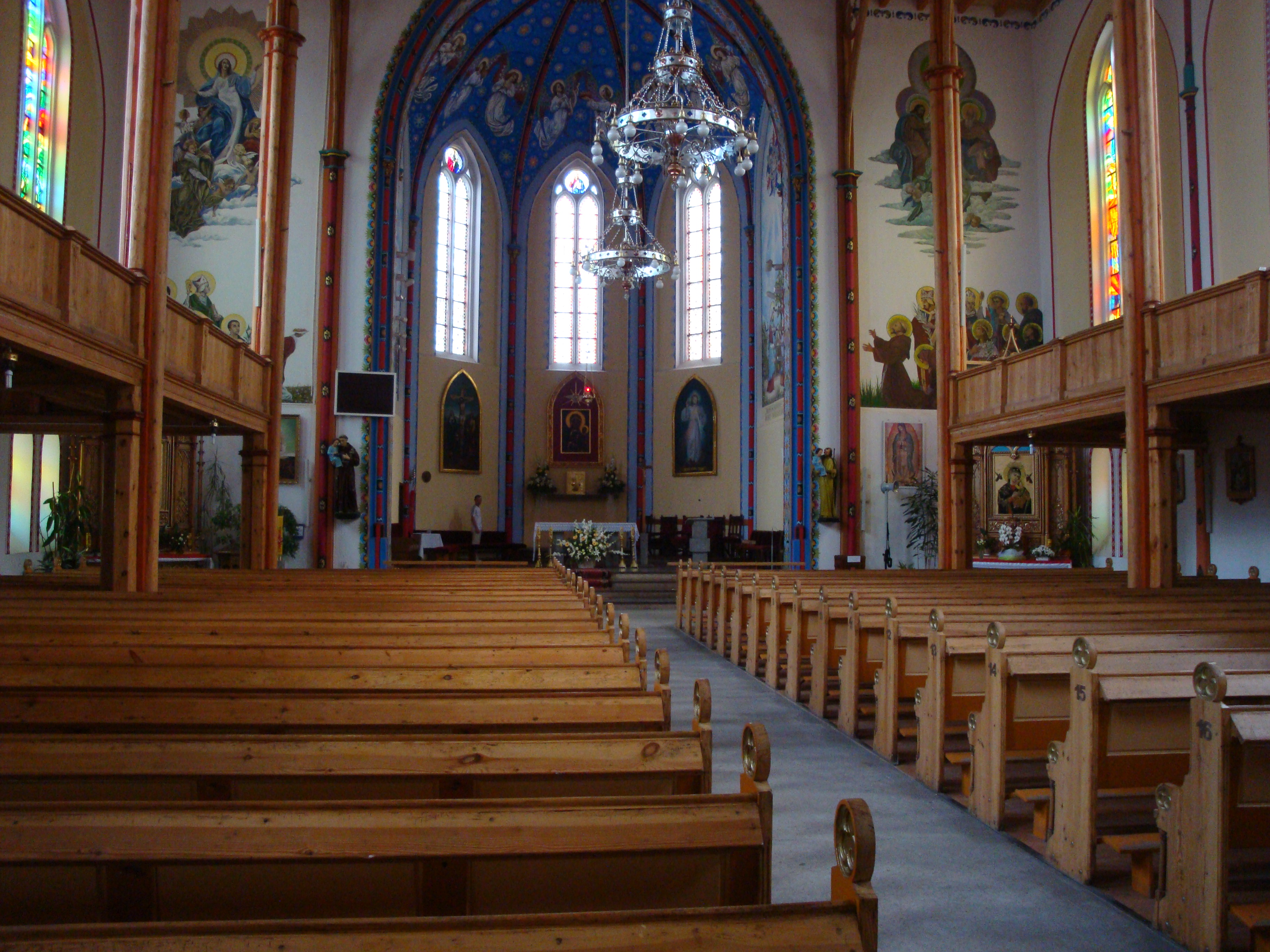
Inside of the building and the altar
