= Lębork =

Town in Pomeranian Voivodeship, Poland

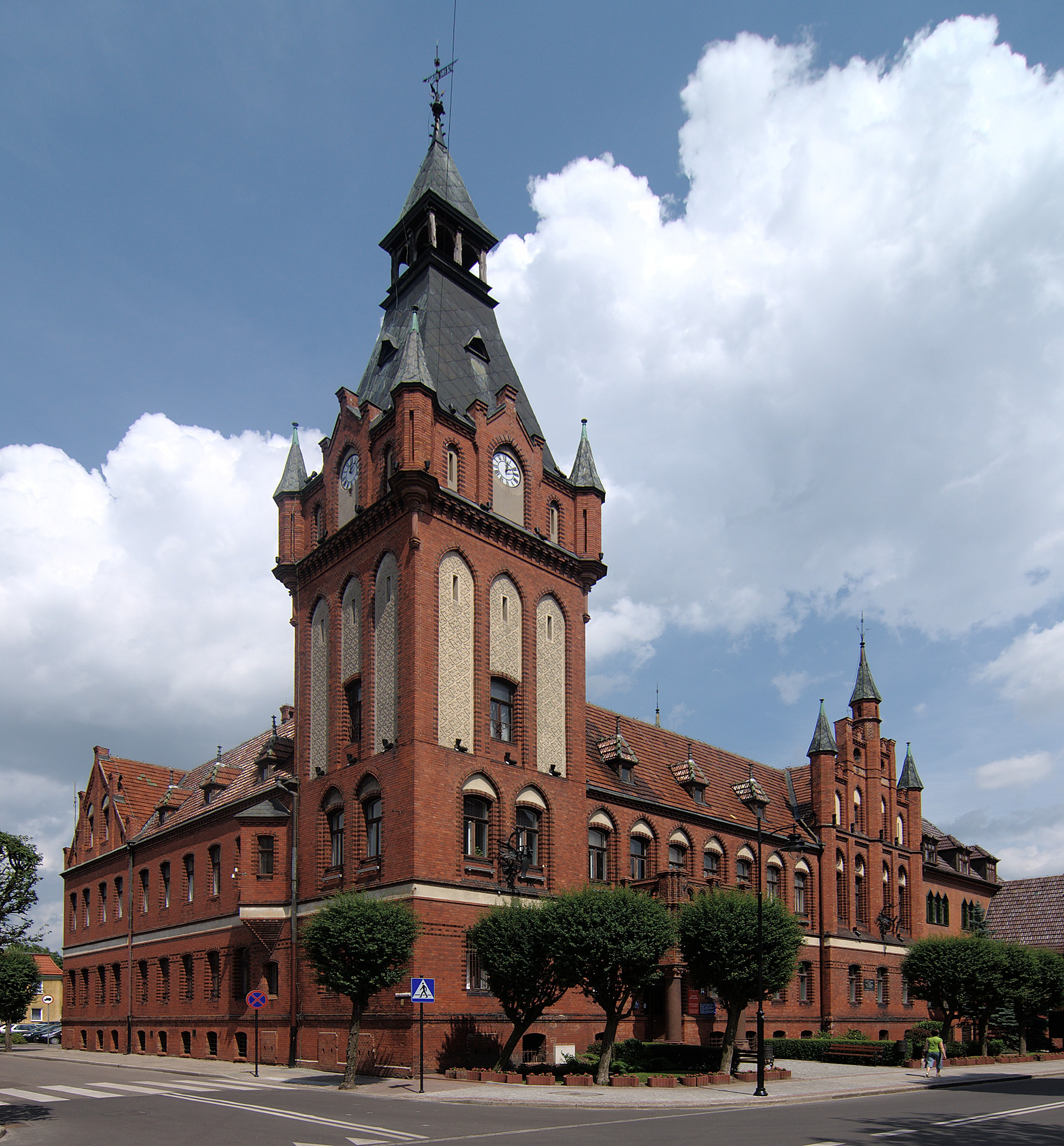
- Neo-gothic City Hall

- Flag Coat of arms
- Motto(s): Miasto z Europejską klasą City with European class
- Location within Pomeranian Voivodeship Location within Poland
- Coordinates: 54°33′N 17°45′E
- Country: Poland
- Voivodeship: Pomeranian
- County: Lębork County
- Gmina: Lębork (urban gmina)
- Town rights: 1341

Government
  - Mayor: Jarosław Litwin (Independent)

Area
  - Total: 17.86 km^{2} (6.90 sq mi)
- Highest elevation: 46 m (151 ft)
- Lowest elevation: 17 m (56 ft)

Population (30.06.2024)
  - Total: 33 865
  - Density: 1,896/km^{2} (4,910/sq mi)
- Time zone: UTC+1 (CET)
  - Summer (DST): UTC+2 (CEST)
- Postal code: 84–300 to 84–310
- Area code: +48 59
- Car plates: GLE
- Website: http://www.lebork.pl

Lębork (Polish pronunciation: [ˈlɛmbɔrk]; Kashubian: Lãbòrg; German: Lauenburg in Pommern) is a town on the Łeba and Okalica rivers in the Gdańsk Pomerania region in northern Poland. It is the capital of Lębork County in the Pomeranian Voivodeship. Its population is 33,865.

== History ==
=== Middle Ages ===
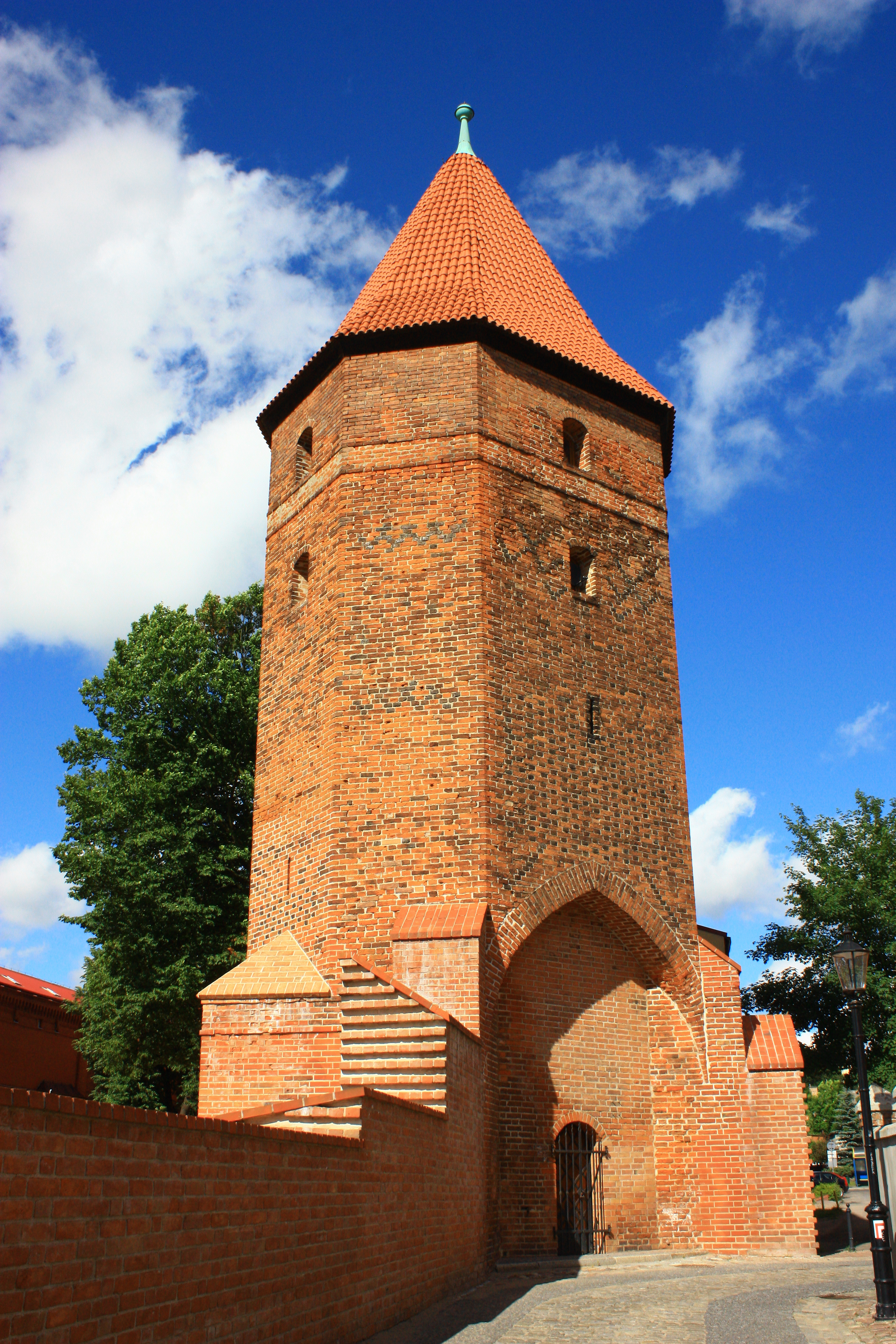
Ivy Tower (Wieża Bluszczowa), part of the medieval city walls

The region formed part of Poland since the establishment of the country in the 10th century. The town was founded on the site of a previous Slavic settlement, dating back to the 10th century. Its name was Germanised to Lewin and then Lewinburg by the Teutonic Knights, after annexation from Poland in 1310. In 1341 Dietrich von Altenburg, Grand Master of the Teutonic Knights, granted 100 Hufen (similar to hides) to Rutcher von Emmerich for the foundation of a town named Lewinburg (Lauenburg) with Kulm rights, presumably to secure the territory around Stolp (Słupsk). East of the original city the Teutonic Order completed the Ordensburg castle in 1363. The castle was partly razed after the 1410 Battle of Grunwald and remained under Polish control until 1411. In 1440 the town joined the Prussian Confederation, which opposed the Teutonic Knights, and at the request of which King Casimir IV Jagiellon signed the act of re-incorporation of the town and region to the Kingdom of Poland in 1454. The population of Lębork was composed in large part of Kashubians, later Slovincians.

In 1454 after the outbreak of the Thirteen Years' War, troops from Danzig (Gdańsk) occupied Lębork and Bütow (Bytów); the following year they were turned over to Eric II, Duke of Pomerania, to form an alliance. Because Lauenburg remained loyal to the Prussian Confederation and not the Teutonic Order, King Casimir IV Jagiellon of Poland granted the town three nearby villages. Troops from the Polish-allied city of Gdańsk (Danzig) reoccupied Lauenburg in 1459 when the mayor, Lorenz Senftopf, entered into negotiations with the Teutonic Knights. Eric replaced the Danzigers with Teutonic Knights the following year, however, when he switched sides during the war. After the Teutonic Knights were ultimately defeated in the Thirteen Years' War, Lębork passed to Poland, according to the 1466 Second Peace of Thorn, and was granted by Casimir IV Jagiellon to Eric and his Pomeranian successors as part of the Lauenburg and Bütow Land, a Polish fief.

=== Modern era ===
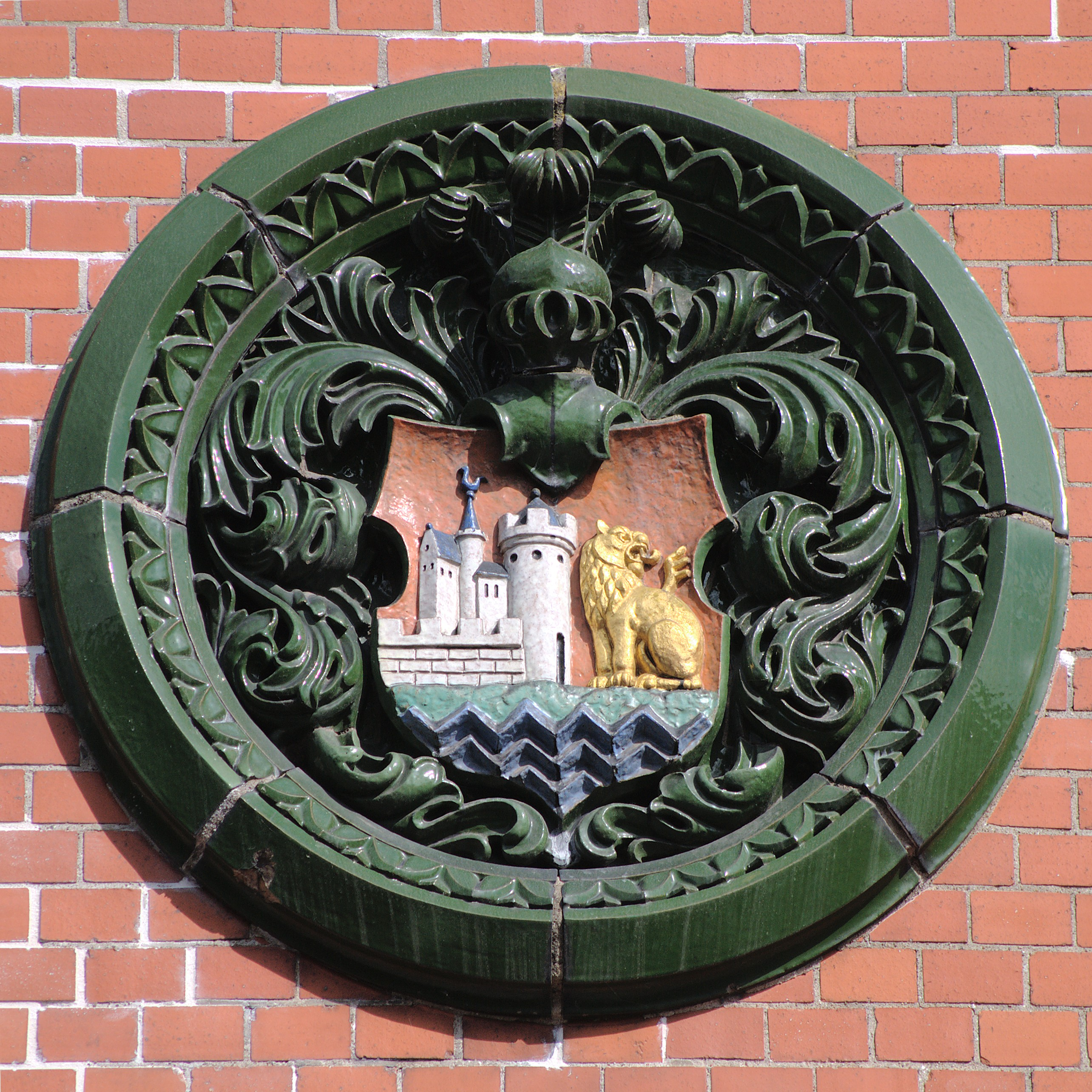
Lębork coat of arms on the facade of the town hall

The Protestant Reformation was introduced in the town soon after 1519. The territory came back to Polish King Władysław IV Vasa as a reverted fief and was integrated with the Polish Pomeranian Voivodeship after the 1637 death of Bogislaw XIV, Duke of Pomerania. As Lębork was the leading city of the territory, it became the seat of the eldership (starostwo). The starosts were Stanisław Koniecpolski and Jakub Wejher. The Counter-Reformation was largely ineffective in the Lutheran town. Lębork was occupied by Swedes in the Northern Wars. To gain an ally against Sweden during the Deluge, King John II Casimir of Poland gave the Lauenburg and Bütow Land to Margrave Frederick William of Brandenburg-Prussia as a hereditary fiefdom in the 1657 Treaty of Bromberg. The Swedish troops burnt Lauenburg before their retreat in 1658, destroying seventy houses and the town hall. Frederick William released the town from tax duties for five years to aid in its rebuilding. Lauenburg suffered a second fire in 1682. King John III Sobieski made peaceful attempts to reintegrate the town directly to Poland, but to no avail.

In 1701, Lauenburg/Lębork became a Prussian-administered territory under the sovereignty of the Polish Crown. From 1737 to 1752, Polish Reformed Church services were held in the town. The 1773 Treaty of Warsaw granted full sovereignty over the territory to Prussia after the First Partition of Poland. The Lauenburg and Bütow Land, transformed into a district (Lauenburg-Bütowscher Kreis), was first included in the newly established province of West Prussia, but was transferred to the province of Pomerania in 1777.

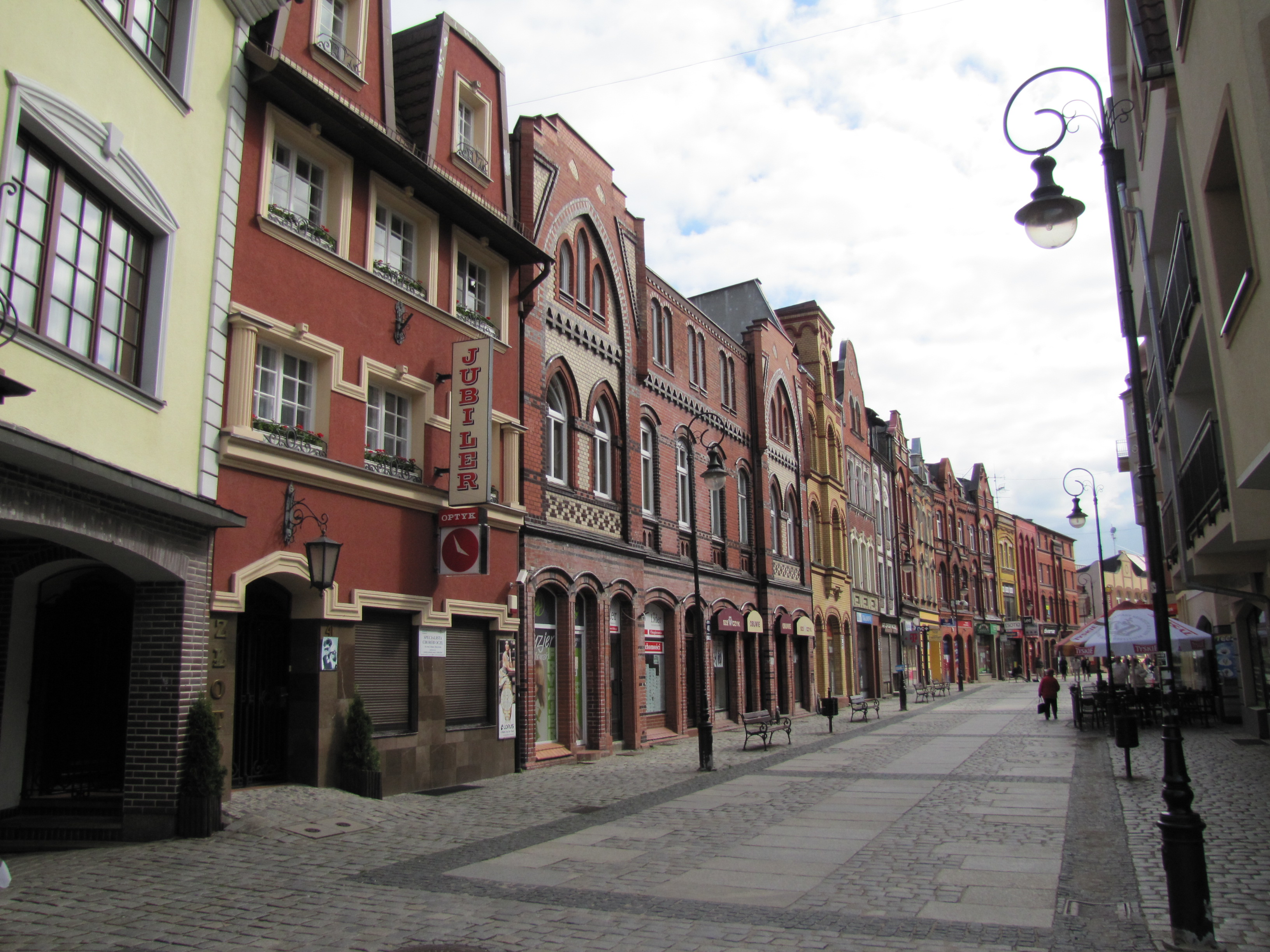
Staromiejska Street, one of the most prominent promenades in the town

When the district was divided in 1846, Lauenburg became the capital of a new district (Landkreis Lauenburg i. Pom.). Lauenburg began to develop as an industrial center after its 1852 connection to the Prussian Eastern Railway to Danzig and Stettin (Szczecin). In 1866, the Masonic Lodge was formed, whose membership was in the main made up of the elite entrepreneurial class. The building survives to this day. The town became part of the German Empire in 1871 during the unification of Germany. Chancellor Otto Fürst von Bismarck (1815–1898) was made an honorary citizen in 1874. (He was also created Duke of Lauenburg in 1890 after his resignation as Chancellor of the German Empire, but this title refers to the city of Lauenburg/Elbe in present-day Germany, and should not be confused with Lębork/Lauenburg in Pomerania.) New German settlers came to the town, but Poles also still settled there. Despite Germanisation policies, the Polish-Kashubian movement developed. Helpful in preserving Polish culture and identity was the local Catholic church, in which Polish language lessons were still organized.

Poland regained independence after World War I in 1918, and local Poles organized a pro-Polish rally, which was shut down by the local German police. Polish activists were sentenced to several months in prison, and then to exile. Despite Polish attempts at regaining control of the region, the Treaty of Versailles did not restore the pre-partition borders and the town remained within interwar Germany. In the subsequent years many German migrants resettled in and around Lauenburg, while many Poles, including Kashubians, left for the nearby Polish Pomeranian Voivodeship. The town's economy has declined and the nationalists, communists and Nazis gained popularity among the German population. The Poles were active in the Union of Poles in Germany. After the Nazis took power, Poles, as well as Jews, were persecuted. Under the leadership of Willy Fruggel a Hochschule for teacher education was established in the city in 1933.

=== World War II and post-war period ===
After the outbreak of World War II, the persecution of indigenous Poles, including Kashubians, intensified, and the patients of the local psychiatric hospital were murdered in Piaśnica, however, the Polish resistance movement remained present in the district. In 1942, the Germans founded a subcamp of the Stutthof concentration camp and sent prisoners from the Buchenwald concentration camp there. Further prisoners were sent from the main Stutthof camp, and the subcamp was dissolved only in February 1945, during the German-organized evacuation of the Stutthof main camp. The Germans also operated a forced labour subcamp of the Stalag II-B prisoner-of-war camp for Allied POWs in the town. In 1944, the Polish resistance assassinated an SS officer in the town. The town was occupied without resistance by the Soviet Red Army on 10 March 1945. Most of the Old Town burned in the subsequent Soviet rampage, although the Gothic Church of St. James and the Teutonic castle survived. During this time about 600 people committed suicide.

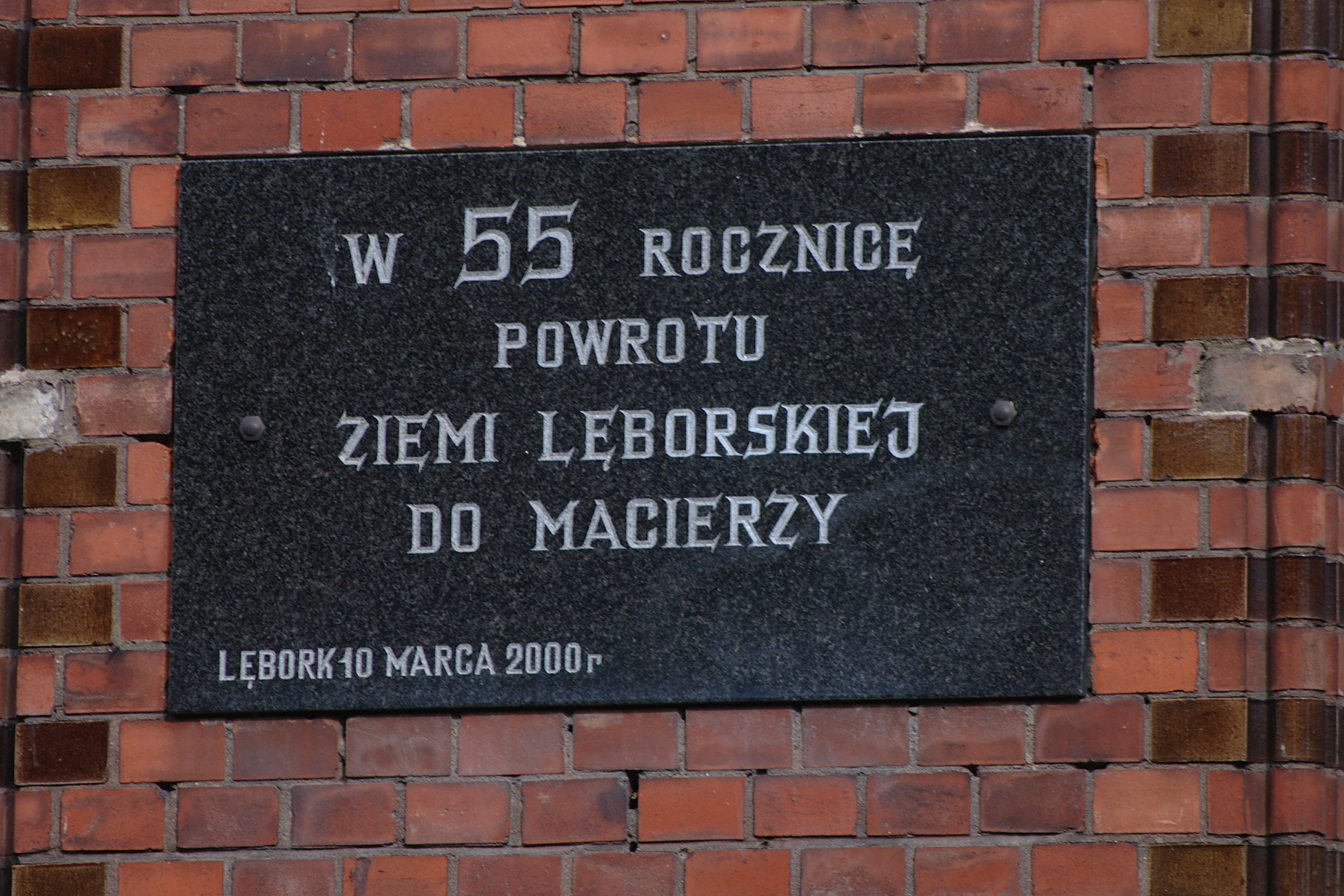
Plaque commemorating the return of Lębork to Poland

As Lębork, the town became again part of Poland in accordance with the post-war Potsdam Agreement. Germans remaining in the town were either immediately expelled in accordance with the Potsdam Agreement or were allowed to voluntarily leave in the 1950s. The remaining Polish inhabitants were joined by other Poles, including those displaced from Poland's eastern lands annexed after the war by the Soviet Union. The town was administratively part of the Gdańsk Voivodeship in 1945–1975, and then the Słupsk Voivodeship in 1975–1998.

== Transport ==
The S6 expressway bypasses Lębork to the south. Two exits of the S6 expressway serve Lębork (exits 45 and 44) and allow for quick access to Słupsk and Gdańsk. The bypass will open fully in a dual carriageway form in 2026.

Lębork is a minor railway junction where the Gdańsk-Szczecin railway line meets the line to the coastal town of Łeba.

== Geography ==
=== Climate ===
The climate in this area has mild differences between highs and lows, and there is adequate rainfall year-round. The Köppen Climate Classification subtype for this climate is "Cfb". (Marine West Coast Climate/Oceanic climate).

Climate data for Lębork (1991–2020 normals, extremes 1951–present)
Month	Jan	Feb	Mar	Apr	May	Jun	Jul	Aug	Sep	Oct	Nov	Dec	Year
Record high °C (°F)	13.6 (56.5)	18.2 (64.8)	24.8 (76.6)	30.2 (86.4)	32.0 (89.6)	35.6 (96.1)	36.3 (97.3)	37.4 (99.3)	32.6 (90.7)	27.8 (82.0)	20.9 (69.6)	14.8 (58.6)	37.4 (99.3)
Mean daily maximum °C (°F)	2.3 (36.1)	3.3 (37.9)	7.0 (44.6)	13.3 (55.9)	17.9 (64.2)	20.8 (69.4)	23.1 (73.6)	23.1 (73.6)	18.4 (65.1)	12.8 (55.0)	7.0 (44.6)	3.4 (38.1)	12.7 (54.9)
Daily mean °C (°F)	−0.2 (31.6)	0.4 (32.7)	2.7 (36.9)	7.6 (45.7)	12.3 (54.1)	15.6 (60.1)	17.9 (64.2)	17.6 (63.7)	13.4 (56.1)	8.8 (47.8)	4.4 (39.9)	1.2 (34.2)	8.5 (47.3)
Mean daily minimum °C (°F)	−2.6 (27.3)	−2.3 (27.9)	−0.6 (30.9)	2.5 (36.5)	6.6 (43.9)	10.2 (50.4)	12.8 (55.0)	12.7 (54.9)	9.3 (48.7)	5.6 (42.1)	2.1 (35.8)	−1.0 (30.2)	4.6 (40.3)
Record low °C (°F)	−32.7 (−26.9)	−31.3 (−24.3)	−21.4 (−6.5)	−8.9 (16.0)	−4.9 (23.2)	−3.4 (25.9)	2.8 (37.0)	0.4 (32.7)	−4.5 (23.9)	−8.7 (16.3)	−16.3 (2.7)	−22.6 (−8.7)	−32.7 (−26.9)
Average precipitation mm (inches)	52.3 (2.06)	39.8 (1.57)	48.0 (1.89)	33.2 (1.31)	59.6 (2.35)	67.5 (2.66)	92.7 (3.65)	73.4 (2.89)	77.3 (3.04)	74.8 (2.94)	63.2 (2.49)	64.5 (2.54)	746.4 (29.39)
Average relative humidity (%)	86.0	84.2	79.8	73.0	73.0	74.9	77.9	78.3	82.7	84.9	88.4	88.2	81.1
Source 1: Institute of Meteorology and Water Management
Source 2: Meteomodel.pl (records, relative humidity 1991–2020)

== Demographics ==
Sights of Lębork (examples)

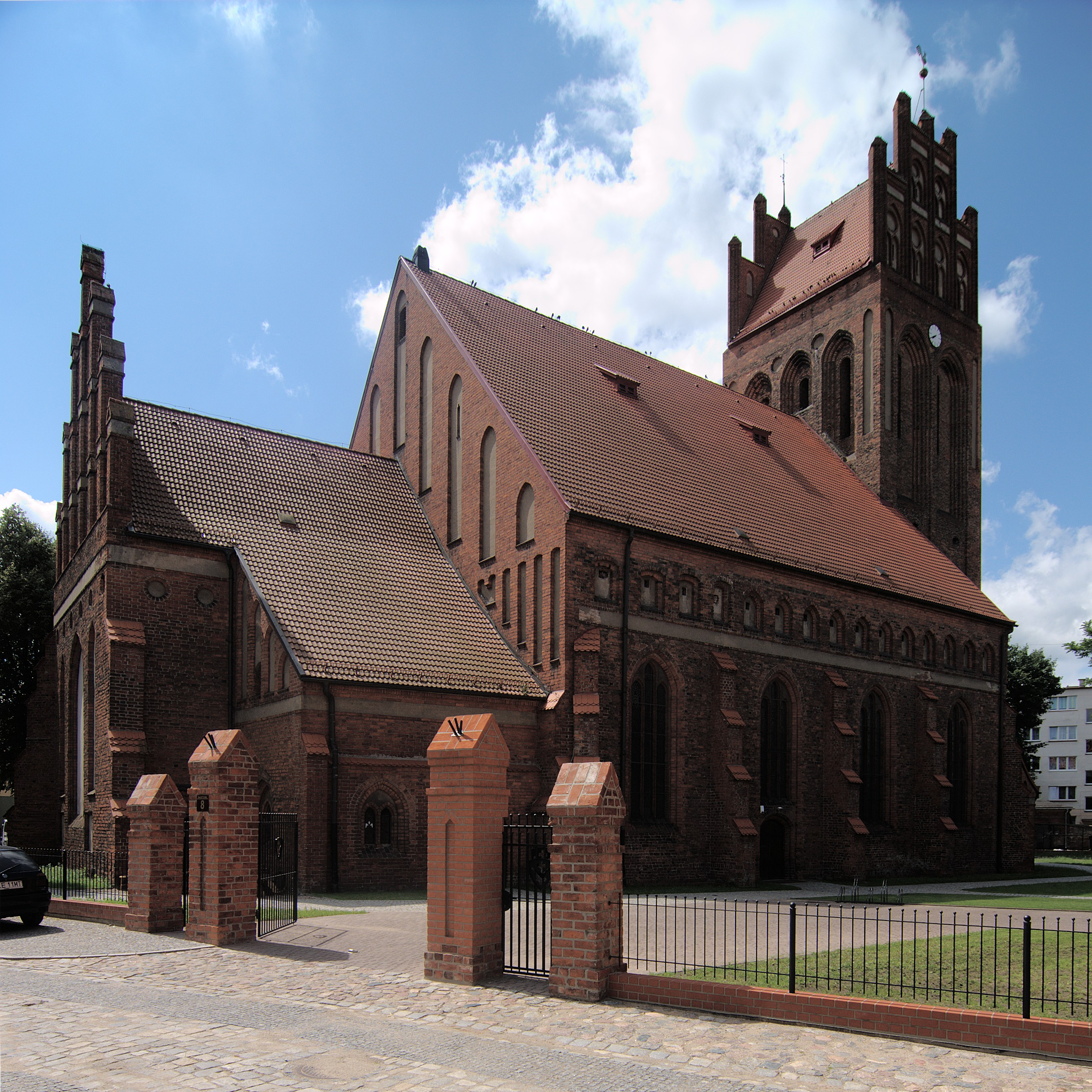
Church of St. James the Apostle

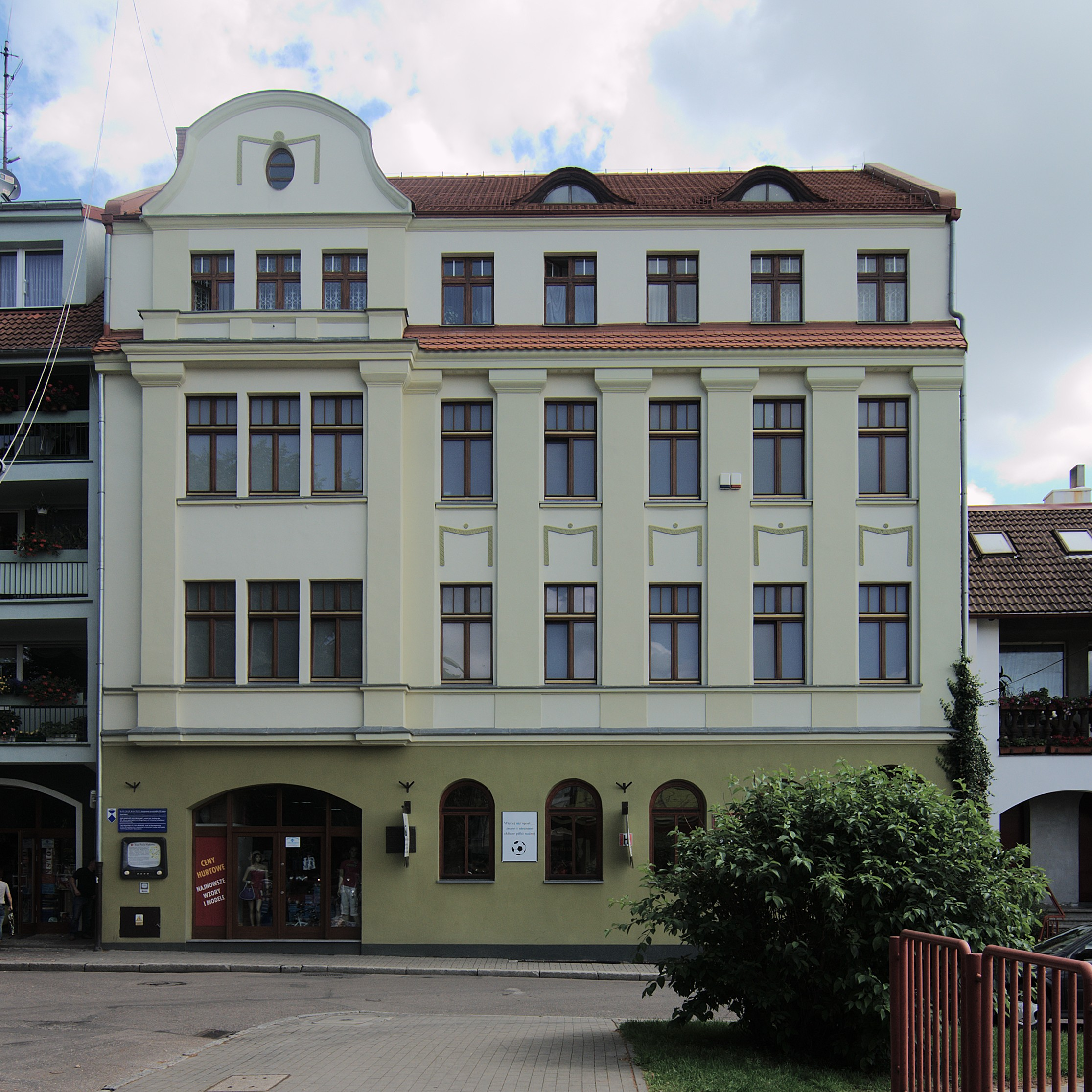
Lębork Museum

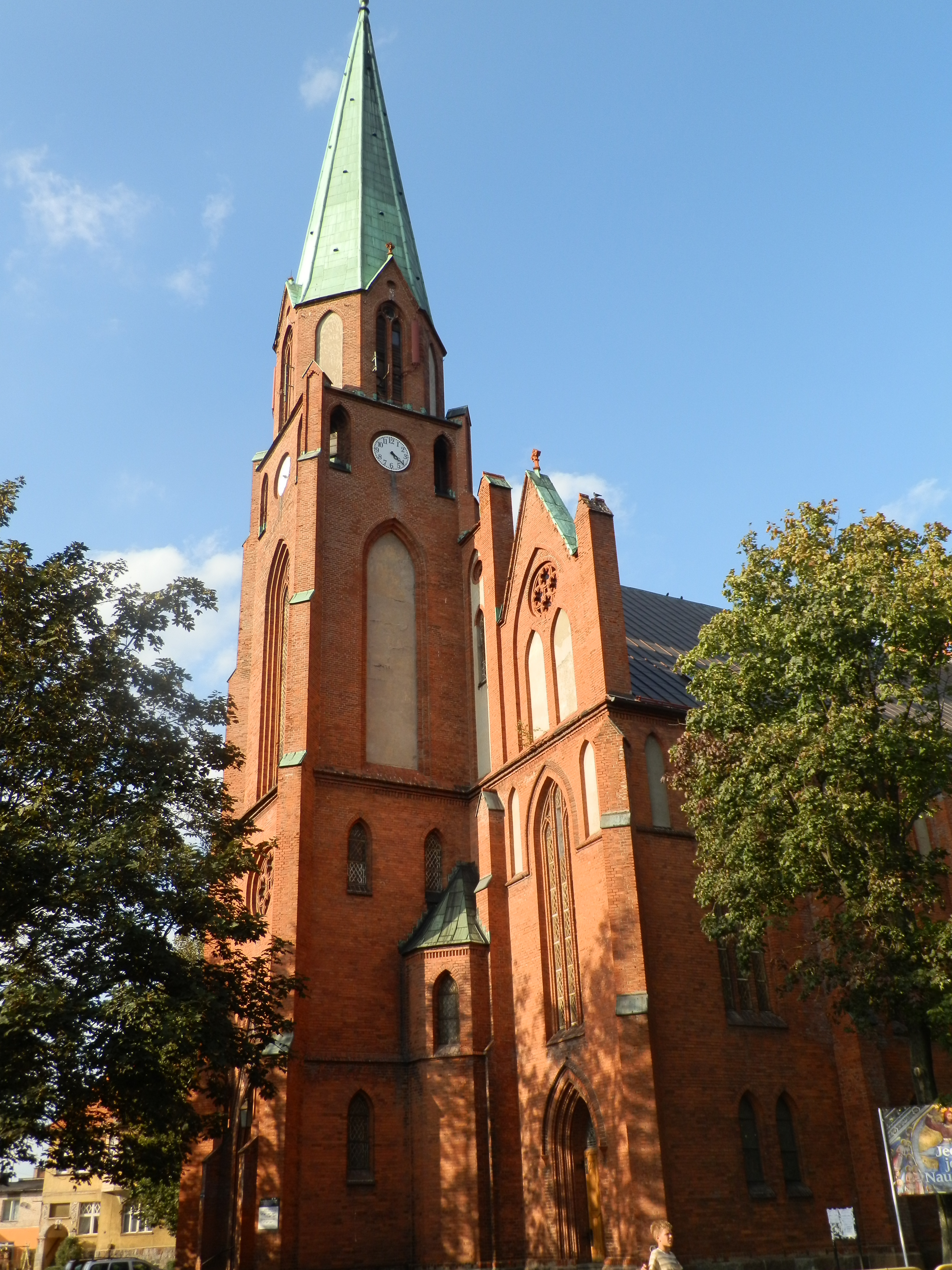
Church of St. Mary, Queen of Poland

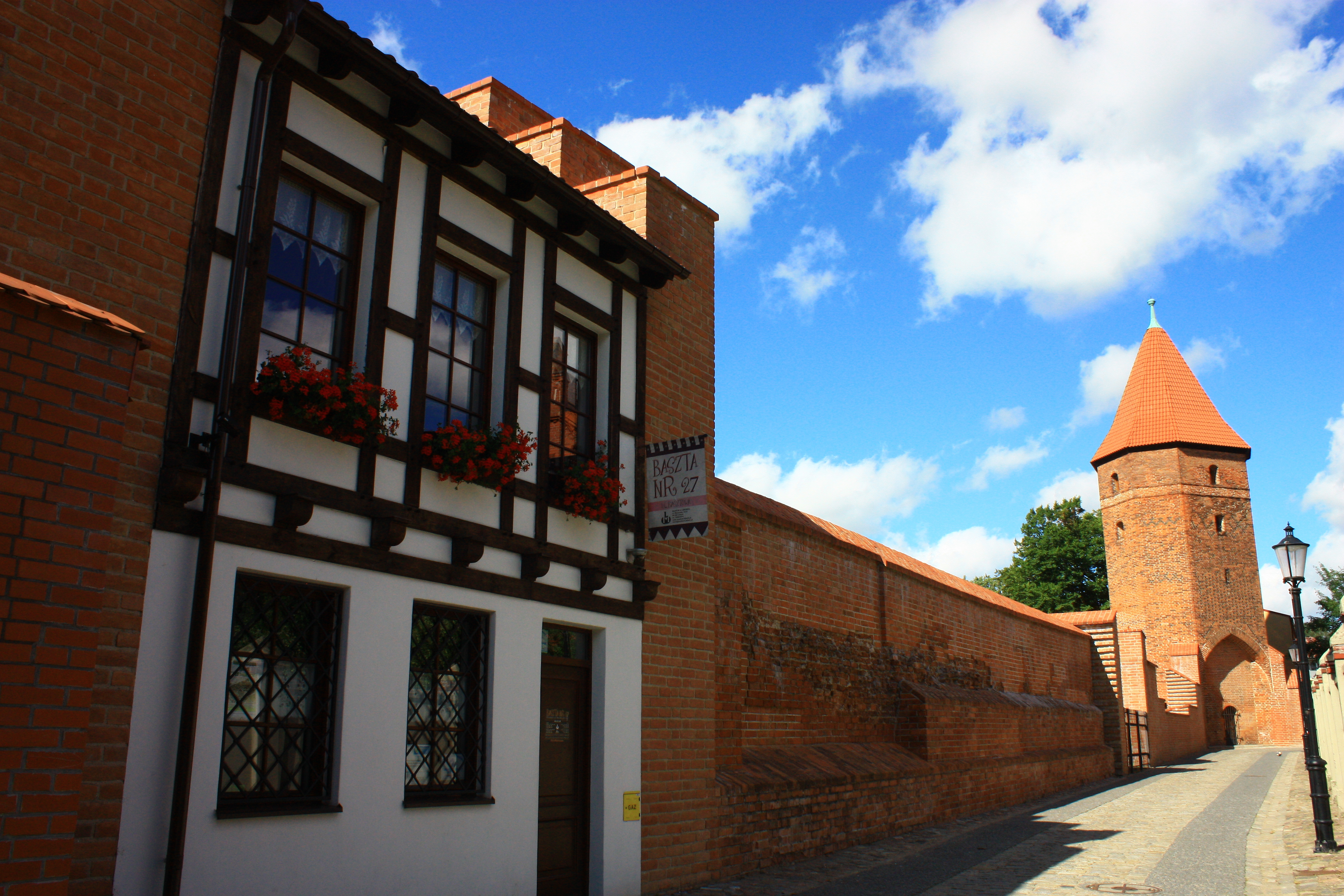
Medieval town walls

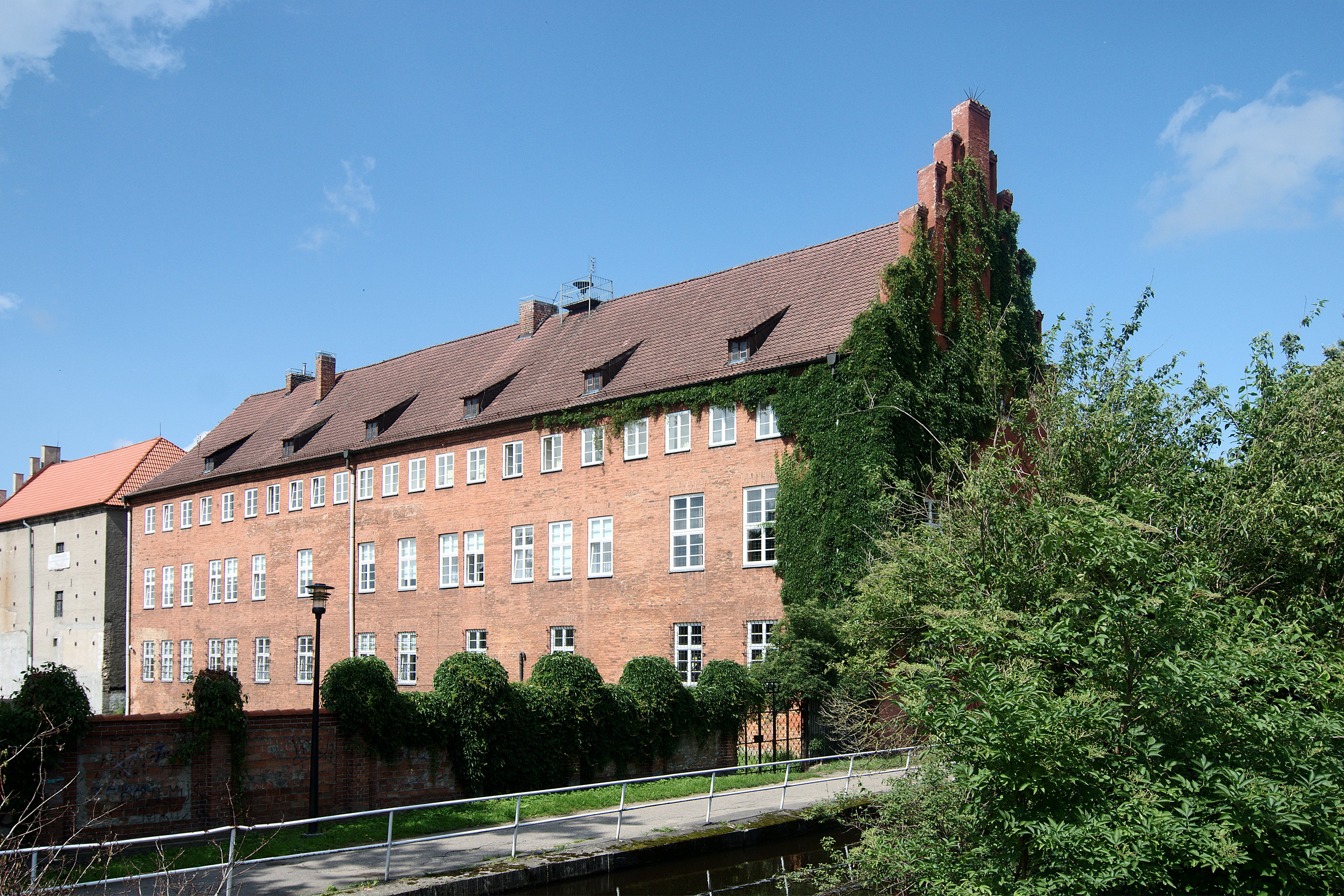
Castle, today a district court

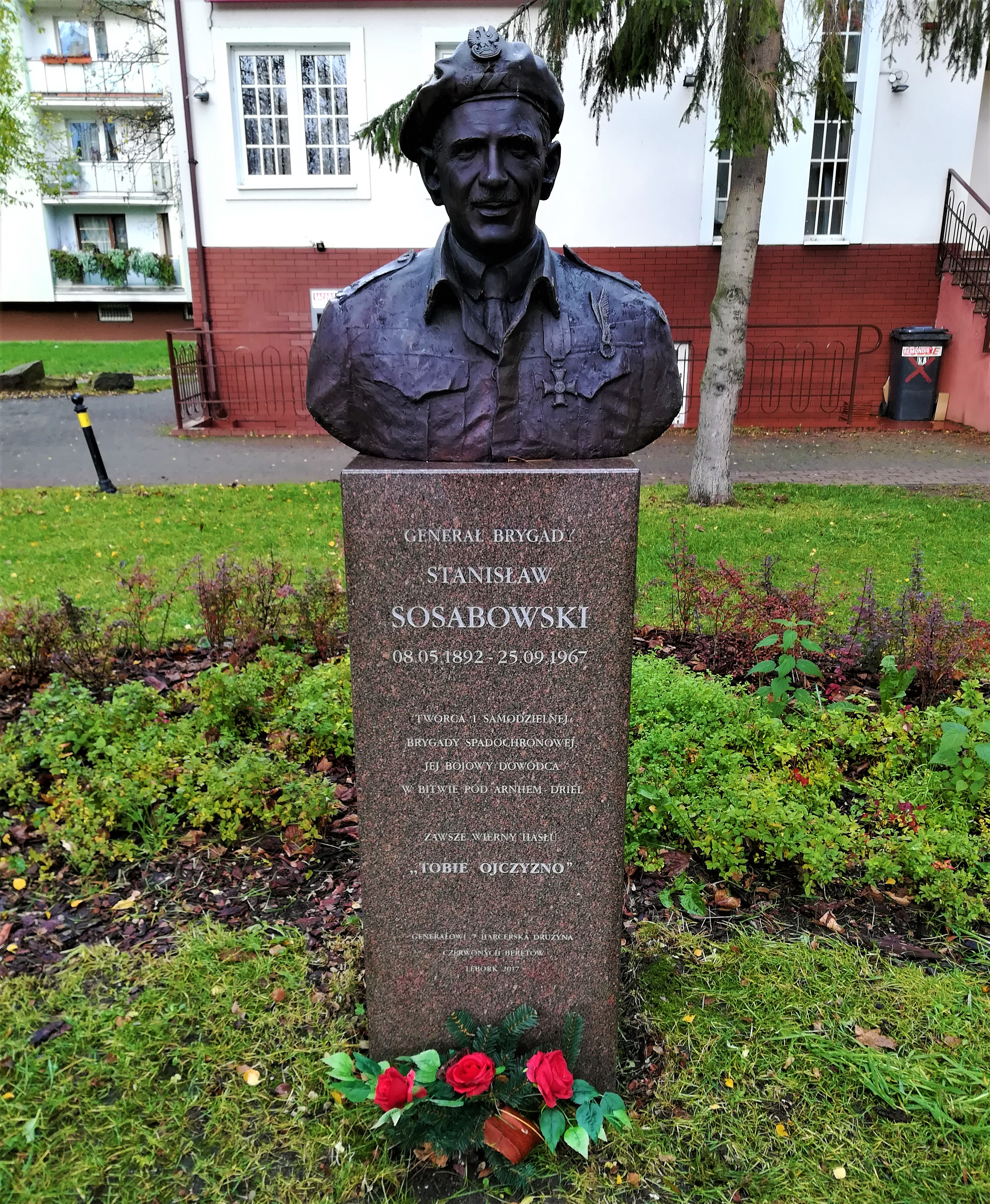
General Stanisław Sosabowski monument

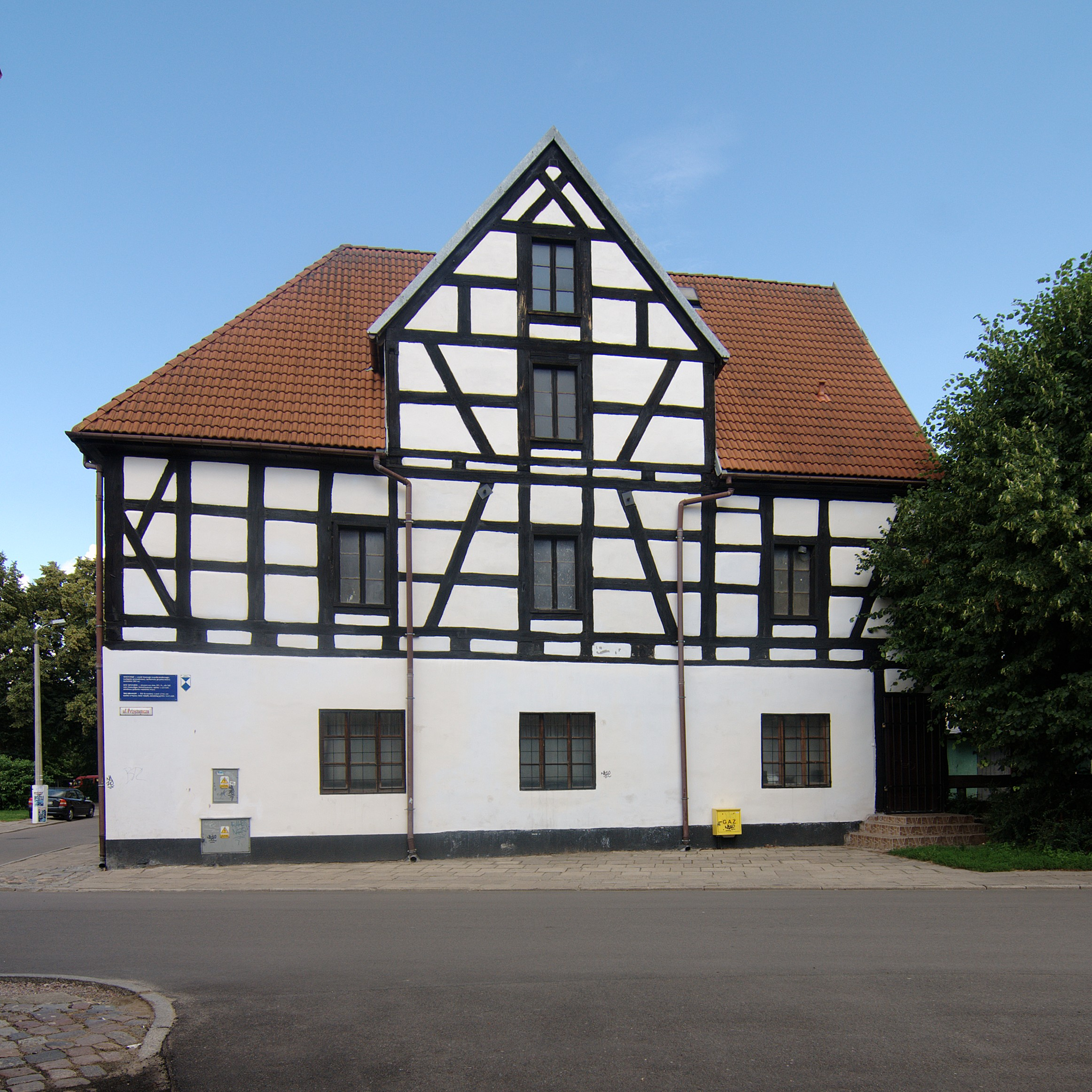
Old salt granary

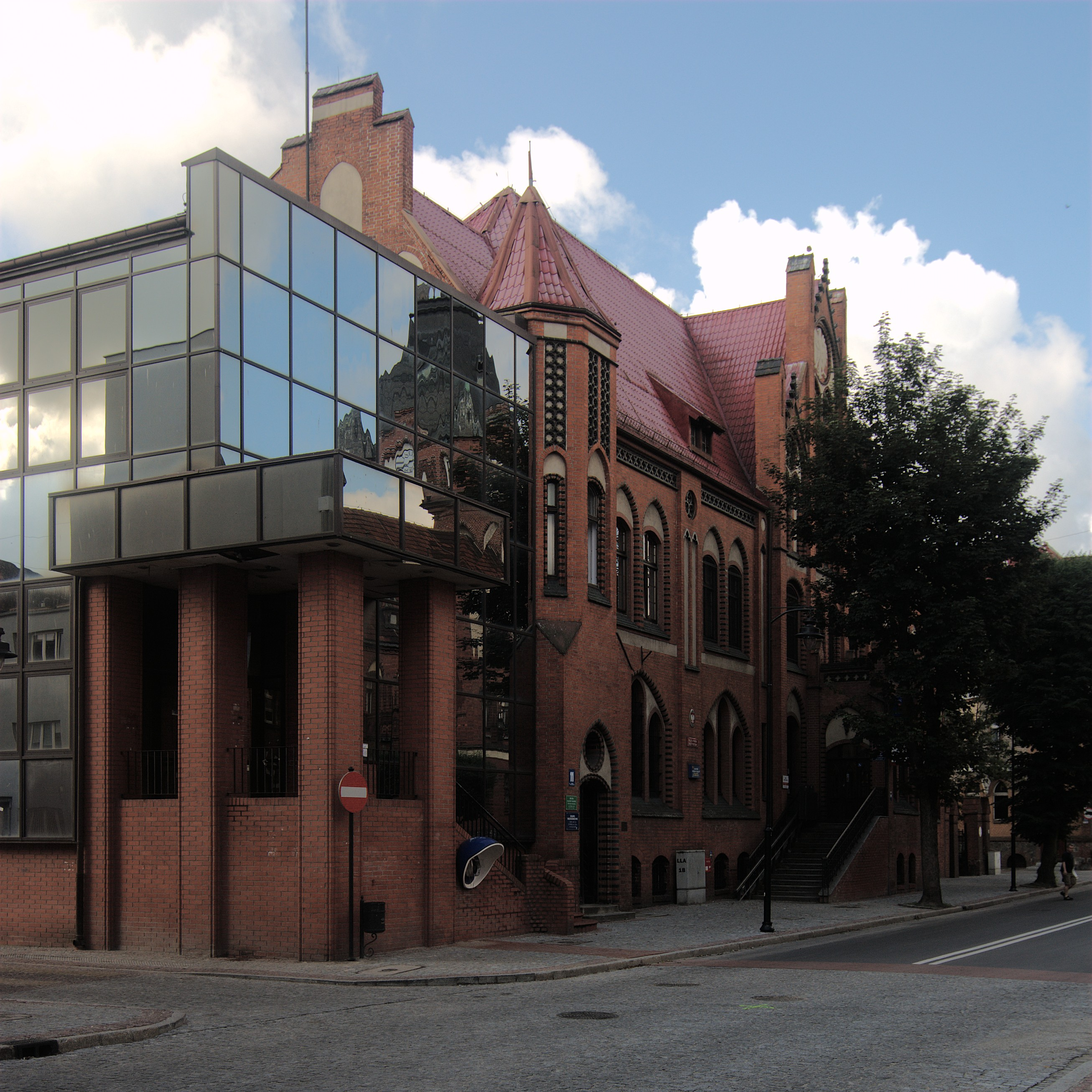
Main post office

In terms of confession, the population was predominantly Catholic since the Christianization of Poland, then it was mostly composed of Protestants after the Reformation, and since the end of World War II it is once again predominantly Catholic.

Number of inhabitants in years

- 1782: 1,482, incl. 36 Jews.
- 1794: 1,432, incl. 29 Jews.
- 1812: 1,548, incl. 48 Catholics and 47 Jews
- 1831: 2,621, incl. 181 Catholics and 147 Jews.
- 1843: 3,779, incl. 222 Catholics and 262 Jews.
- 1861: 5,310, incl. 305 Catholics and 259 Jews.
- 1900: 10,442, incl. 1,151 Catholics and 276 Jews.
- 1910: 13,916
- 1925: 17,161, incl. 1,850 Catholics, 290 Jews and 300 others.
- 1933: 18,962
- 1939: 19,108
- 1960: 21,200
- 1970: 25,100
- 1975: 26,600
- 1980: 29,200
- 1990: 34,300
- 1995: 36,300
- 1998: 37,000
- 2004: 35,154
- 2005: 35,000
- 2024: 33,865

== Transport ==
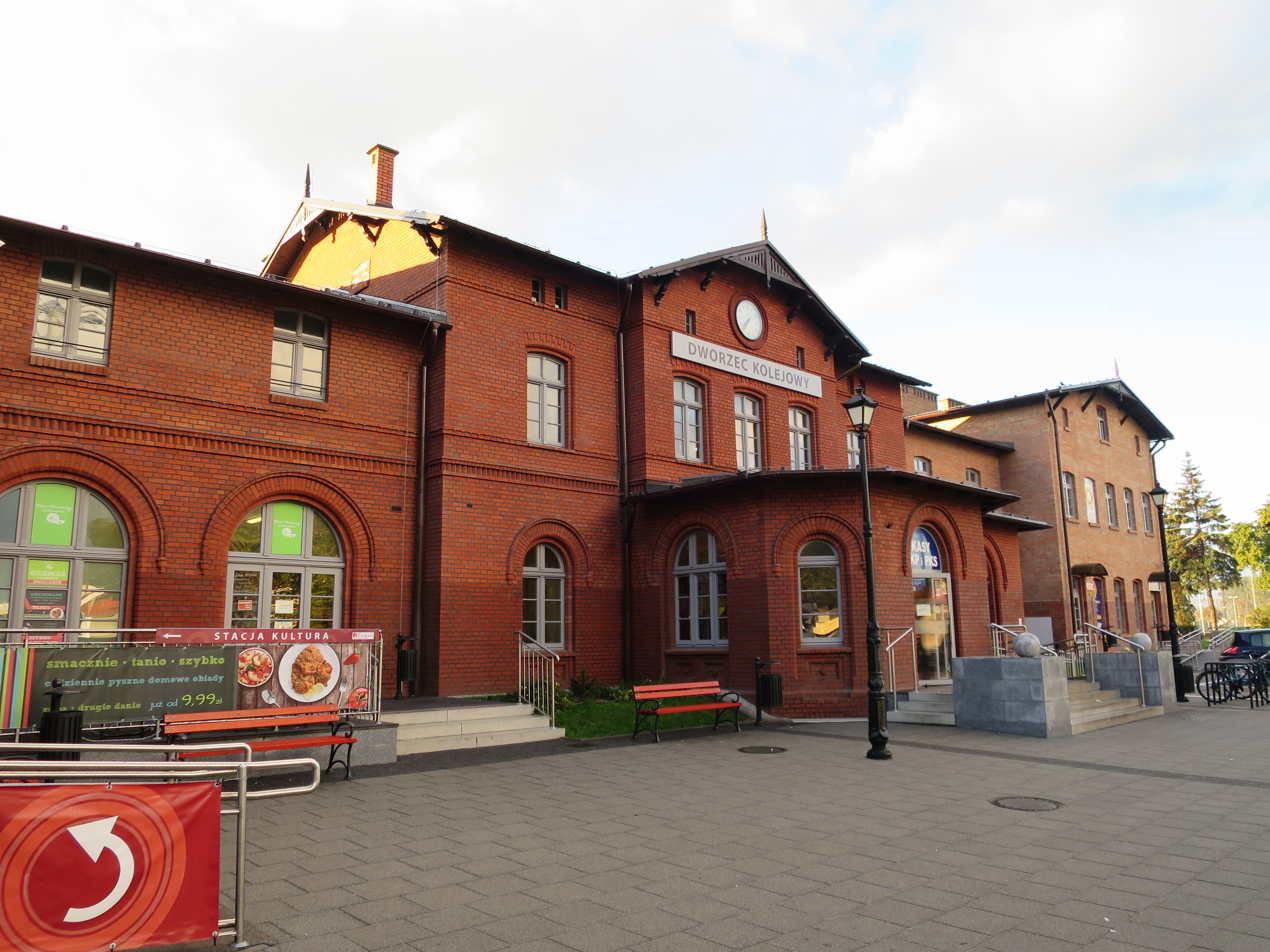
Lębork railway station

Railway stations in the city include Lębork and Lębork Nowy Świat.

== Sports ==
The local football team is Pogoń Lębork. It competes in the lower leagues.

== Notable residents ==
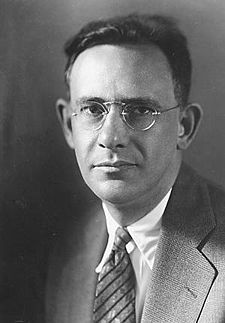
Edward Sapir, 1910

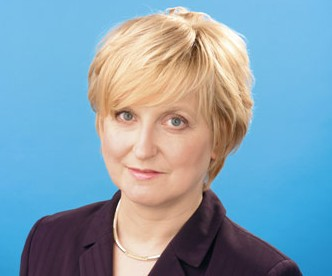
Anna Fotyga, 2007

- Julius Friedrich August Bahnsen (1830 – 1881), philosopher, the originator of characterology
- Paul Gottlieb Nipkow (1860–1940) a German technician, television pioneer, invented the Nipkow disk
- Josef Horovitz (1874–1931) a Jewish German orientalist
- Gerhard Obuch (de) (1884–1960), politician and lawyer
- Edward Sapir (1884–1939), ethnologist and linguist
- Erich von dem Bach (1899–1972), SS officer
- Ethel Reschke (1911–1992) a German actress
- Ewa Paradies (1920–46), concentration camp overseer
- Jürgen Echternach (1937–2006) CDU politician
- Hilbert Meyer (de) (born 1941) professor of the science of education in Oldenburg
- Eugeniusz Geno Malkowski (1942–2016), artist and painter
- Peter Roehr (1944–68) a German artist
- Maciej Gołąb (born 1952), professor of musicology
- Else Streit (1869-?), composer
- Anna Fotyga (born 1957) a Polish politician and MEP, former Minister of Foreign Affairs

Sport

- Philo Jacoby (1837–1922) a former San Francisco sharpshooter, wrestler, weightlifter and gymnast
- Zbigniew Zarzycki (born 1948) a former Polish volleyball player, Olympic Champion in 1976
- Zbigniew Kaczmarek (born 1962) a former Polish football player, played 30 times for Poland
- Alexandra Wojcik (born 1985) a Polish group rhythmic gymnast, participated at the 2004 Summer Olympics
- Damian Schulz (born 1990) a Polish volleyball player, member of Poland men's national volleyball team
- Paula Wrońska (born 1991) a Polish sports shooter, competed in the 2012 Summer Olympics
- Mateusz Żukowski (born 2001) a Polish professional football player, member of Poland men's national football team

== International relations ==
Lębork is twinned with:

Dudelange, Luxembourg	Lauenburg, Germany	Manom, France	Balta, Ukraine	Ogre, Latvia

== See also ==
- Lauenburg and Bütow Land
