= Lębork Nowy Świat railway station =

Railway station in Lębork, Poland

Lębork Nowy Świat

General information
- Location: Lębork; Poland
- Coordinates: 54.545206°N 17.734796°E
- Owner: Polskie Koleje Państwowe S.A.
- Platforms: 1

Construction
- Structure type: Building: Yes (no longer used); Depot: Never existed Water tower: Never existed

History
- Former names: Neue Welt
Location

Lębork Nowy Świat is a PKP railway station in Lębork (Pomeranian Voivodeship), Poland.

== Lines crossing the station ==
Start station	End station	Line type
Pruszcz Gdański	Łeba	Passenger/Freight

== See also ==
- Lębork
