= Church of Saint James the Apostle in Lębork =

- Kościół św. Jakuba Apostoła w Lęborku
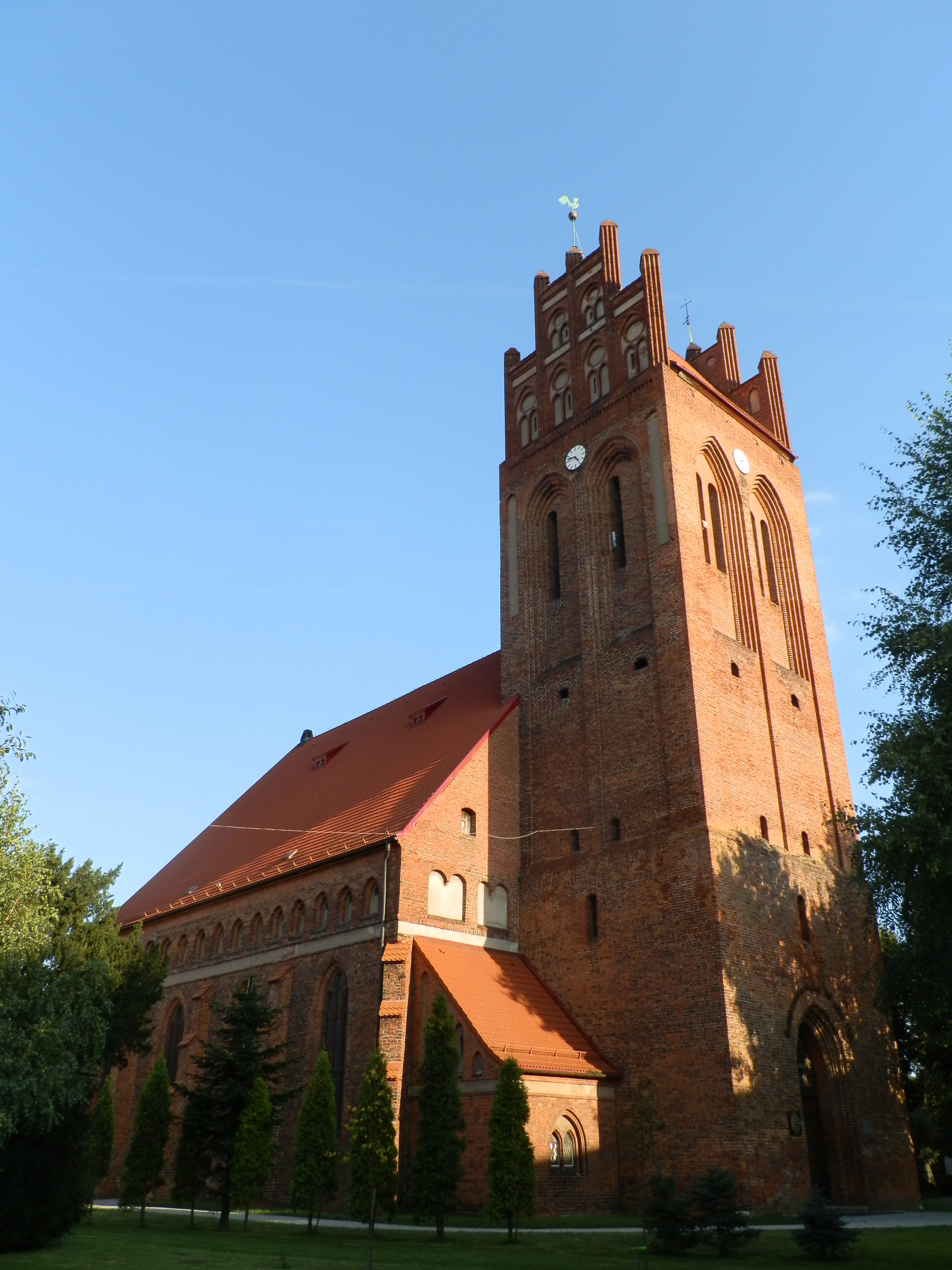
- View from the outside of the church

- Location within Poland
- 54.544947°N 17.750611°E
- Location: Lębork, Poland
- Address: Basztowa 8, 84-300 Lębork
- Denomination: Catholic
- Religious order: Order of Friars Minor Conventual
- Website: https://lebork.franciszkanie.pl

History
- Consecrated: September 13, 1910

Architecture
- Style: Gothic

Specifications
- Materials: Bricks

Administration
- Diocese: Diocese of Pelplin

Church of Saint James the Apostle in Lębork is a Roman Catholic parish church located in Lębork in the Pomeranian Voivodeship. It belongs to the Lębork decanate of the Diocese of Pelplin.

== History ==
The church was built as a fortified church. It is believed that the building was finished in the year 1345, but this is not confirmed by any viable sources. Because of that, it is widely accepted that the church was built at the turn of XIV and XV century.

On March 10, 1945, Red Army soldiers murdered priests Robert König and Franciszek Szynkowski, who were defending women, and the family of the latter in the rectory of the church. In 2015, the 70th anniversary of the crime, a plaque commemorating the event was unveiled.

Since 1945, the church has been under the care of the Order of Friars Minor Conventual. On march 3, 1973, their Monastery was established next to the church.

By decree of Pelplin Bishop Jan Bernard Szlaga dated July 25, 2010, St. James' Church was established as the Sanctuary of St. James the Great.

Inside the church, there are Renaissance tombstones in the southern wall of the presbytery:

- Joachim von Zitzewitz, Starosta of Lębork and Bytów. (died April 9/10 1563)
- Dorothea von Zitzewitz, Joachim's daughter (died April 10, 1566)

== Architecture ==
The building is built in the gothic architectural style and is mostly made from bricks. In the eastern side of the building, there is a separated off presbytery. A tower is present in the western side, the main entrance is located there. The entrance is decorated with a pointed arch portal. The side walls are supported with buttresses and are characterized by large pointed arch windows with stained glass art. Various parts of the building notably, the nave are decorated with lierne vaulting. The sacristy is decorated with diamond vaulting.

== Equipment ==
Notable parts of the church equipment include:

- Baroque altar
- Church tabernacle with ivory elements
- Rococo style pulpit

Some of the church equipment is decorated with the Shell of Saint James, notably the altar and the lavabo bowl.

== Gallery ==
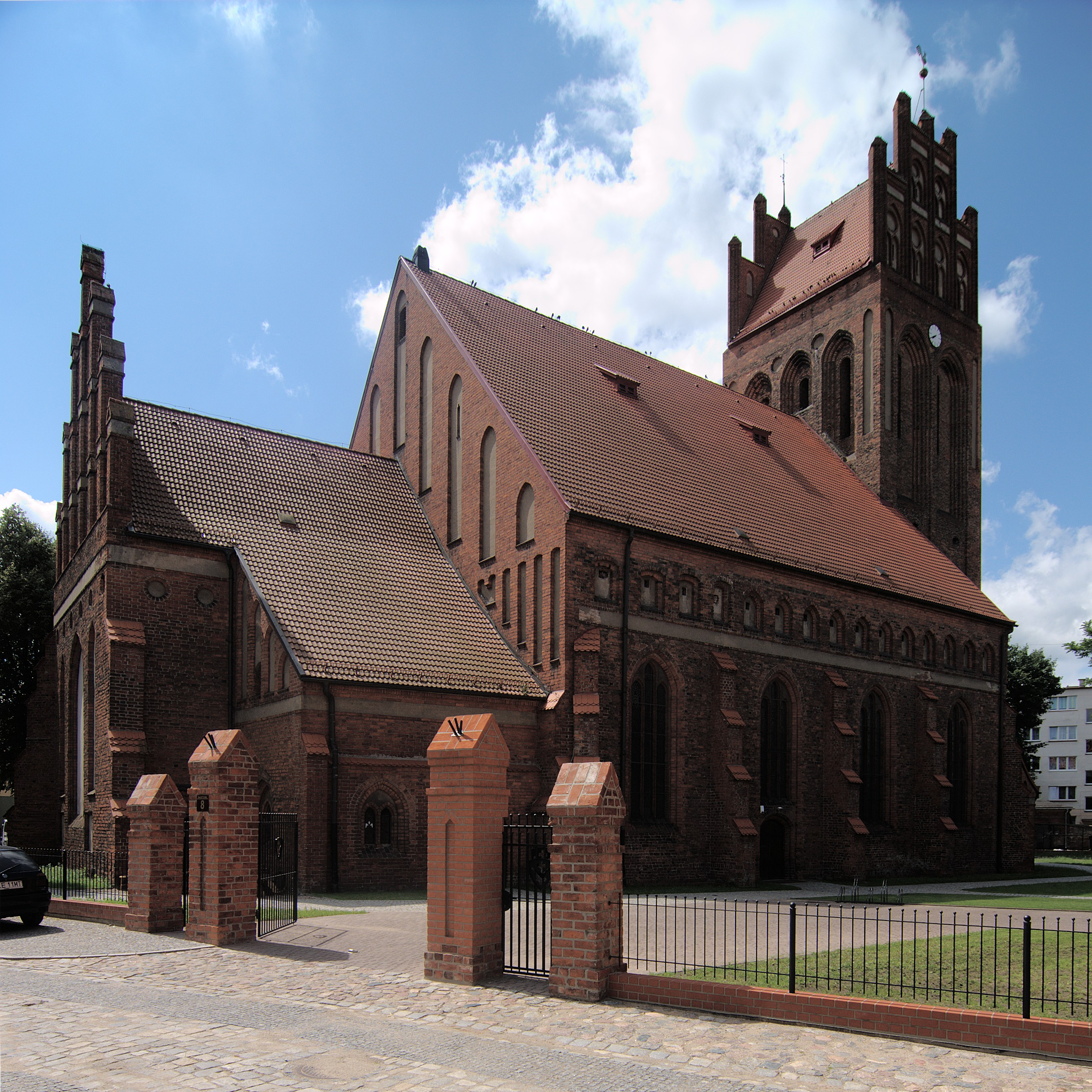
The back of the building

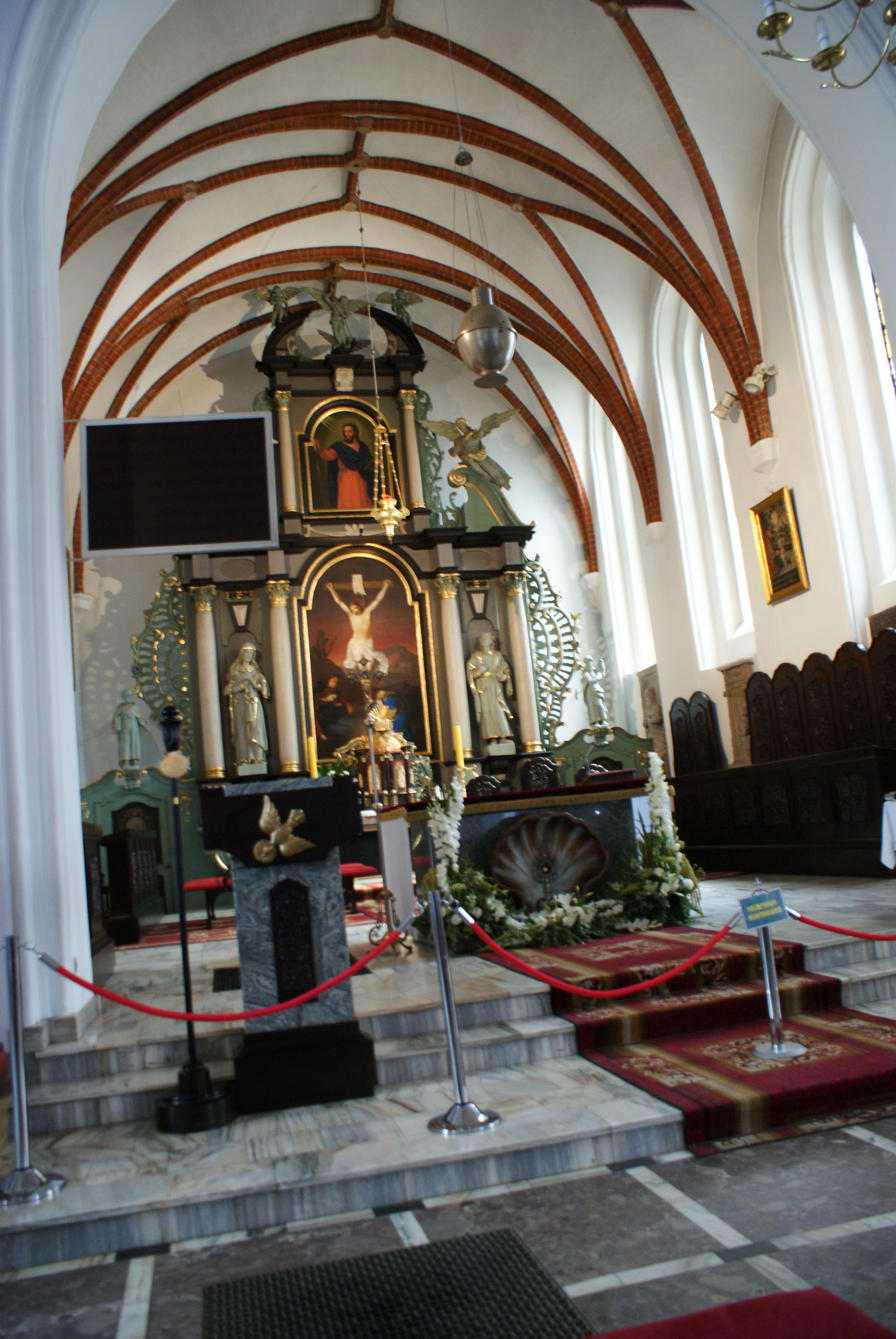
Inside of the church, altar.

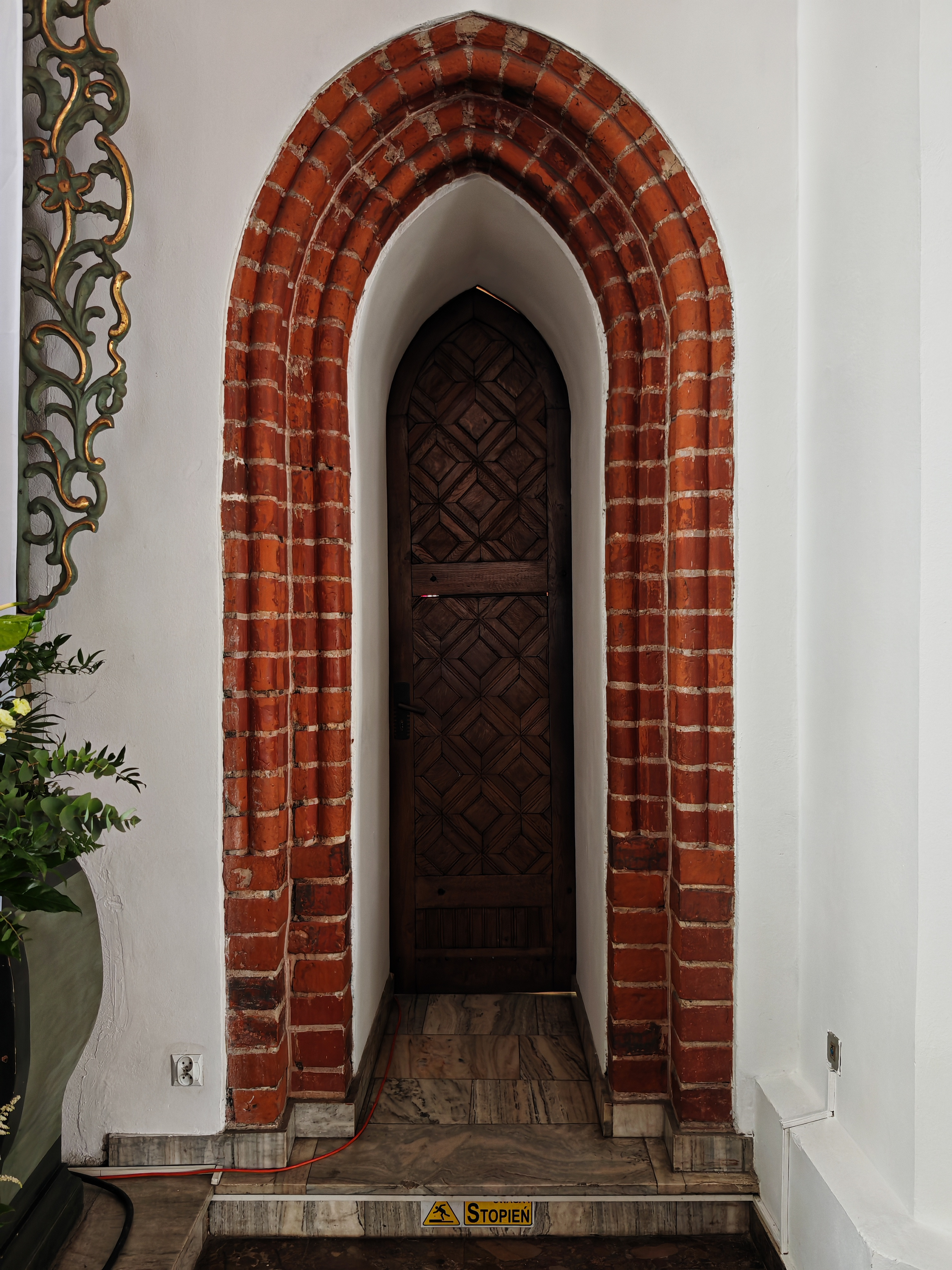
Door leading to the sacristy

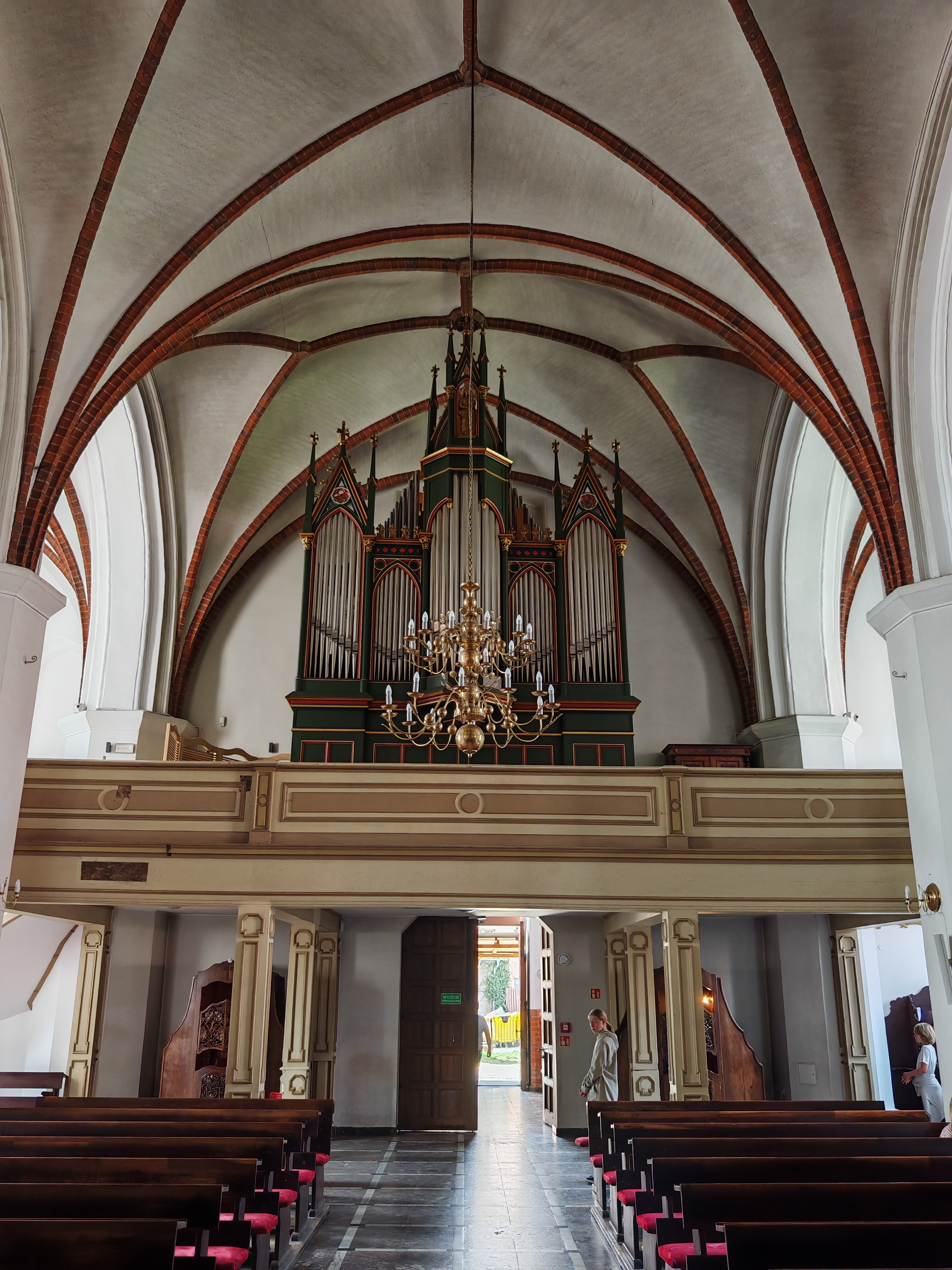
The organ

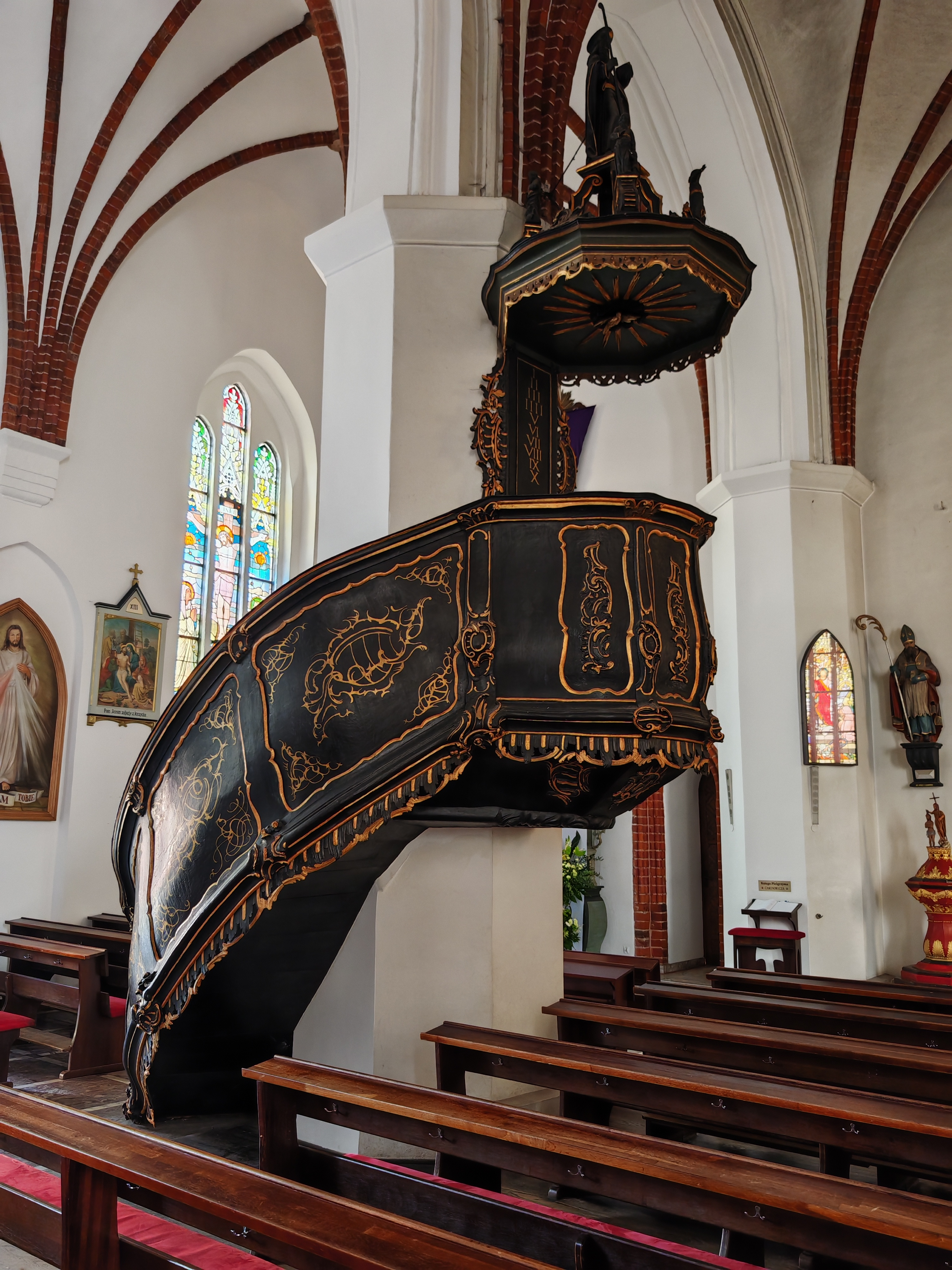
Pulpit

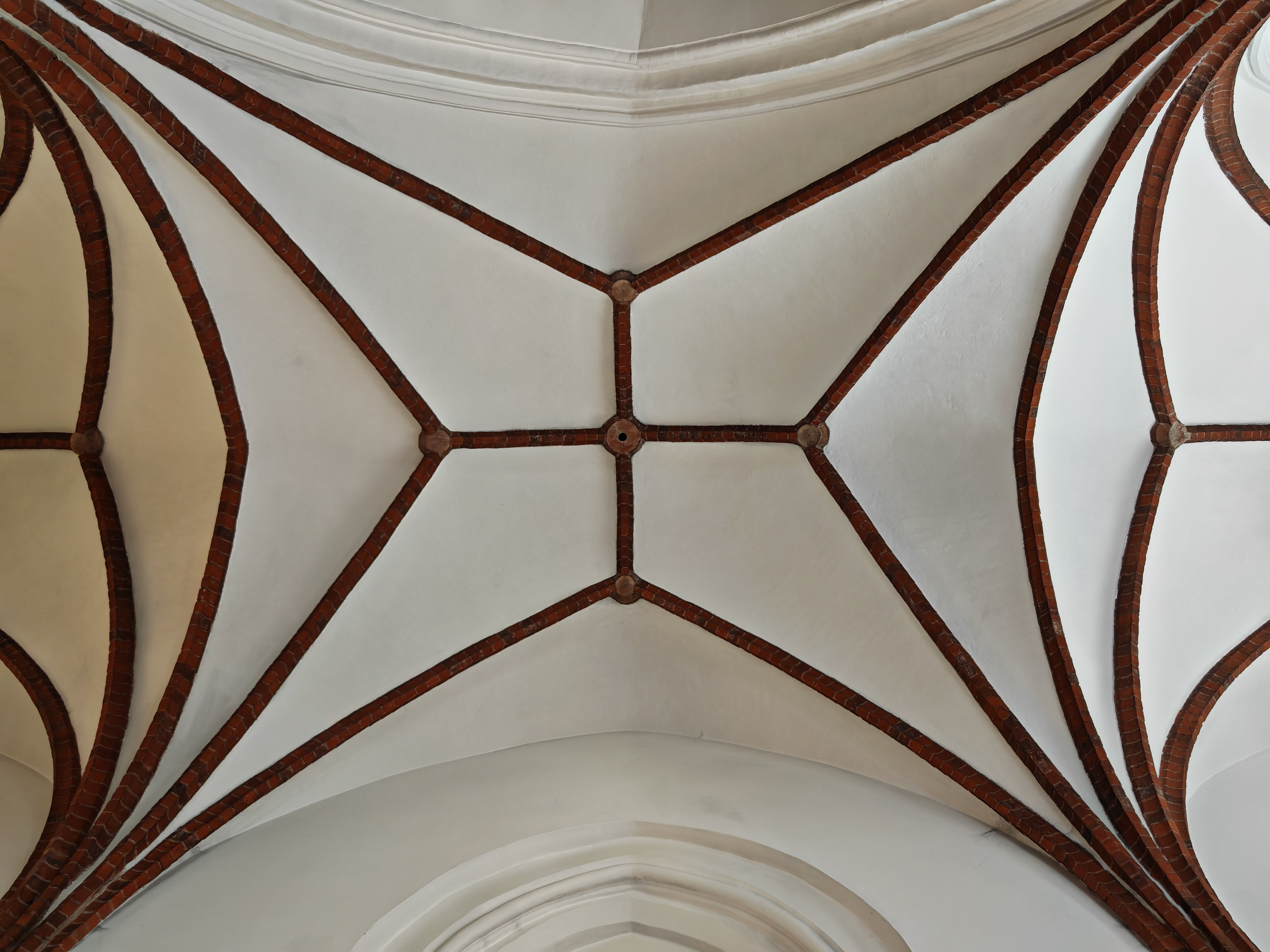
Lierne vaulting of the nave.

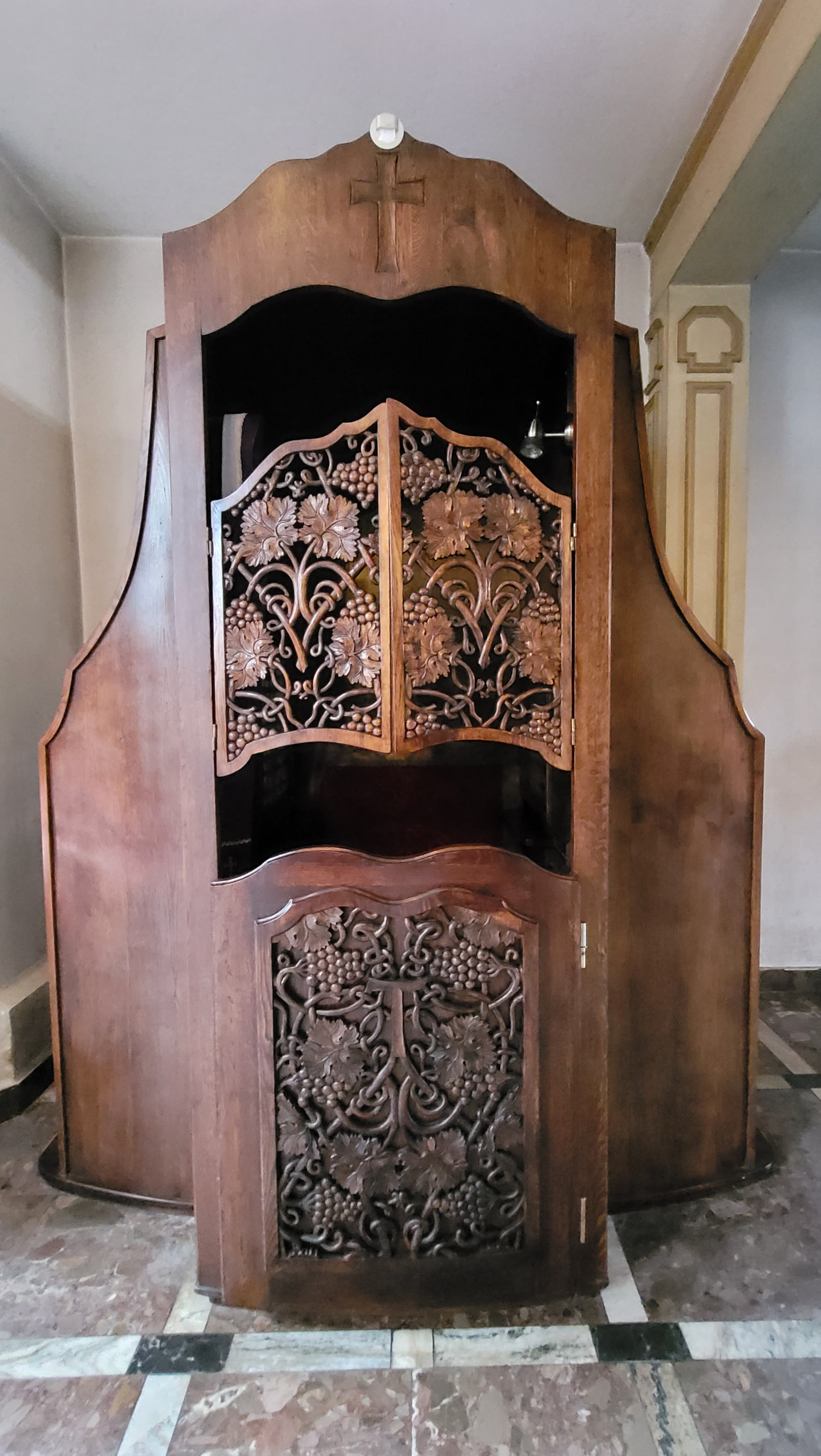
Confessional

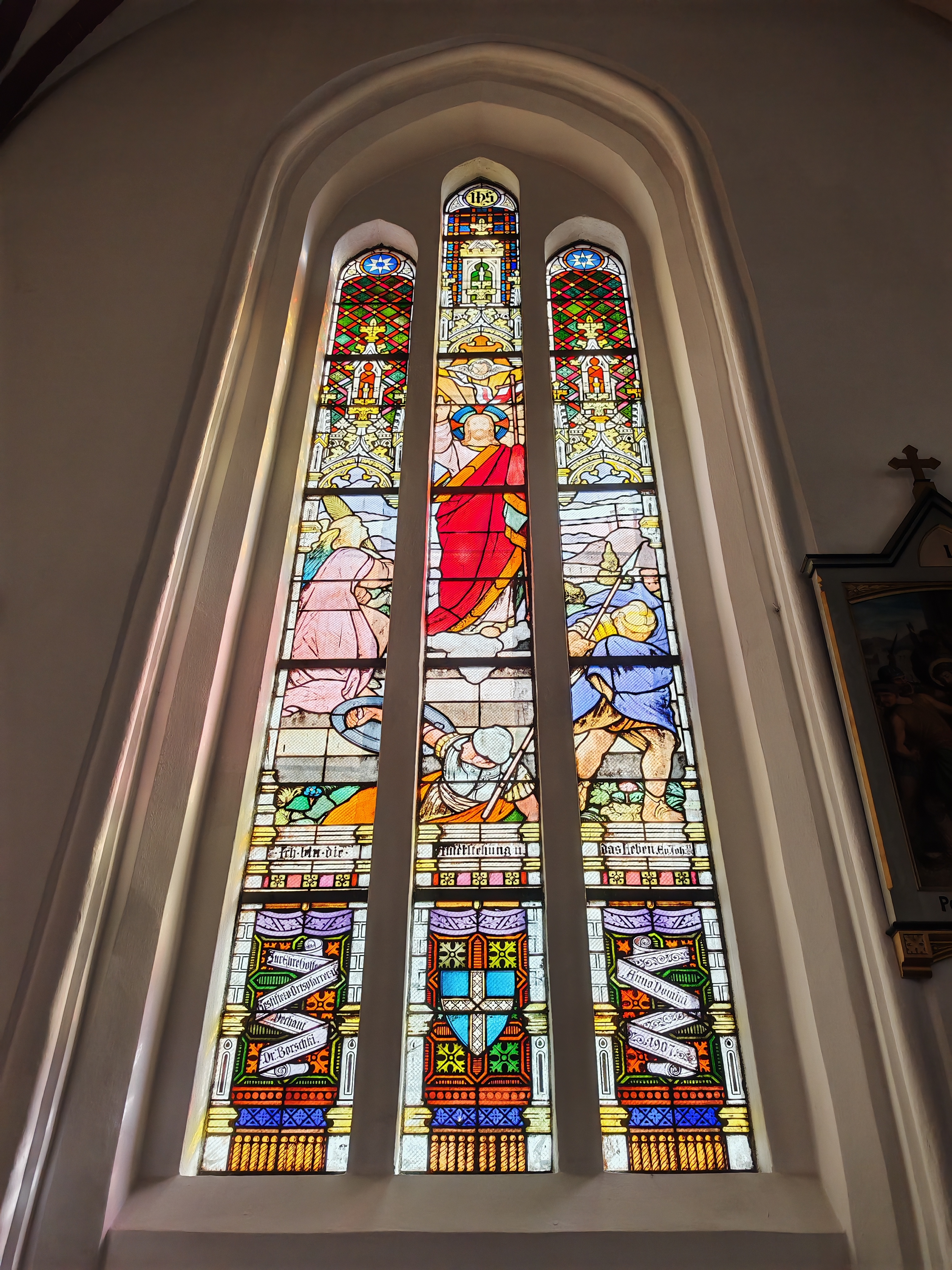
An example of Pointed arch stained glass windows

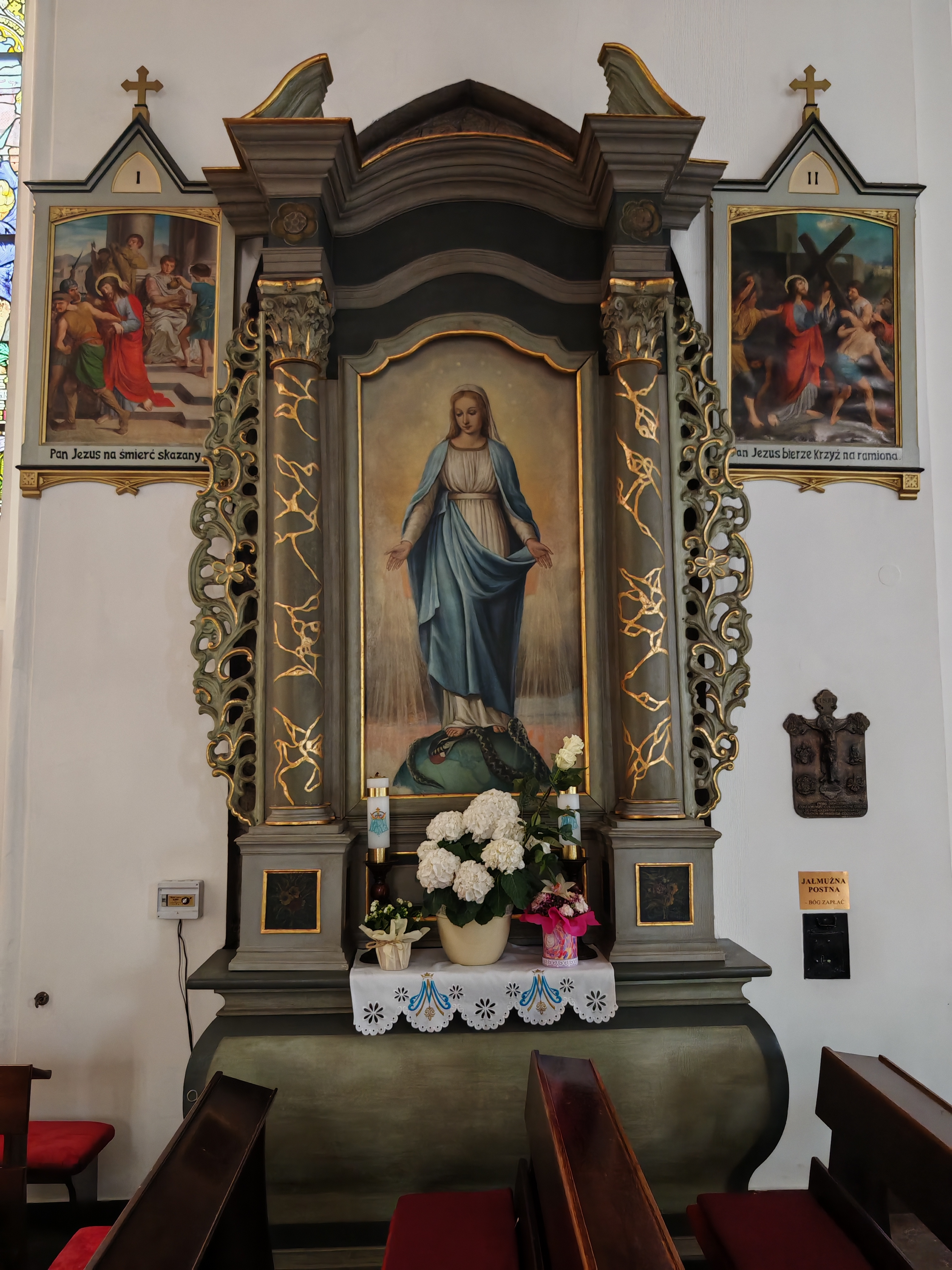
One of the paintings present in the church

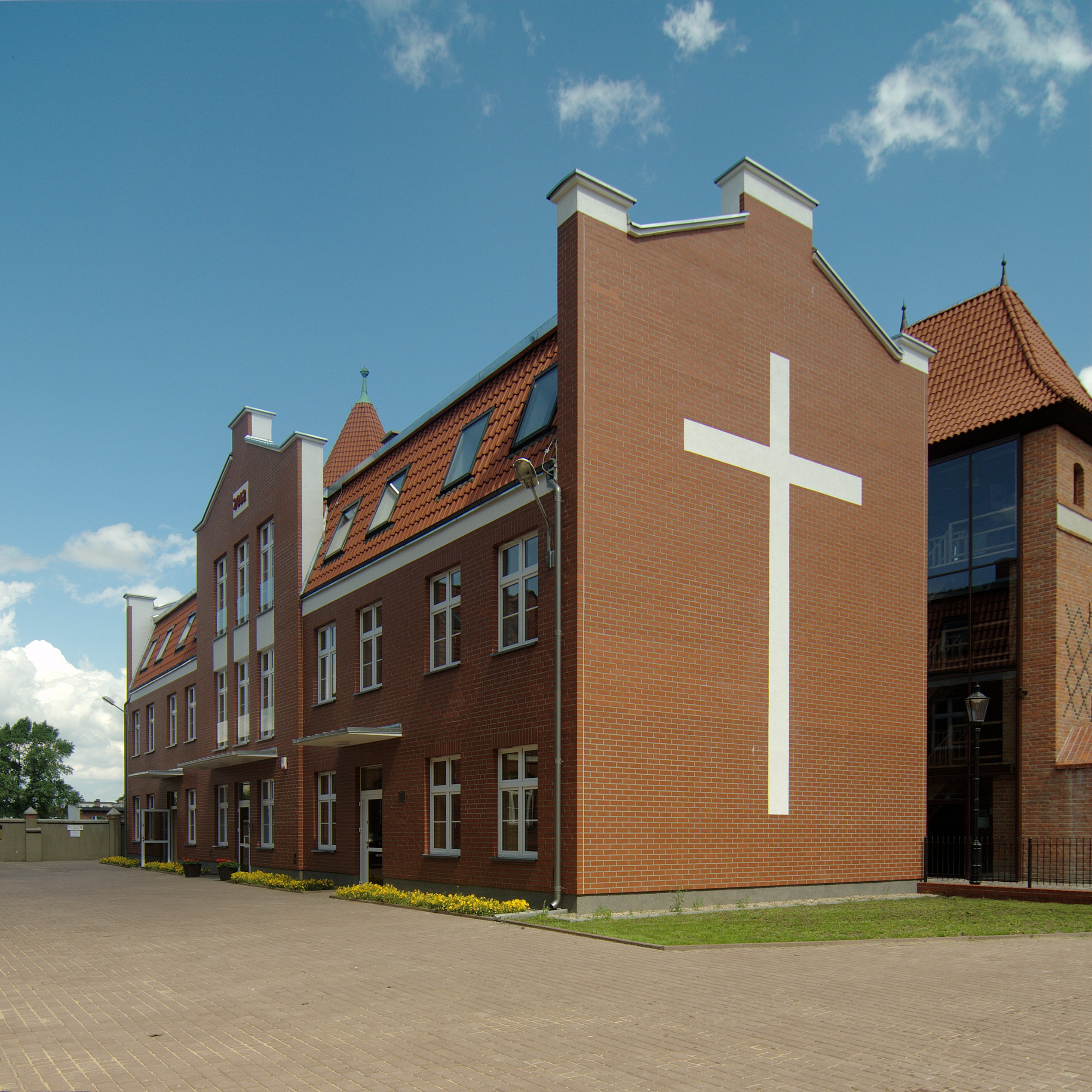
Pilgrim's house
