= Okalica =

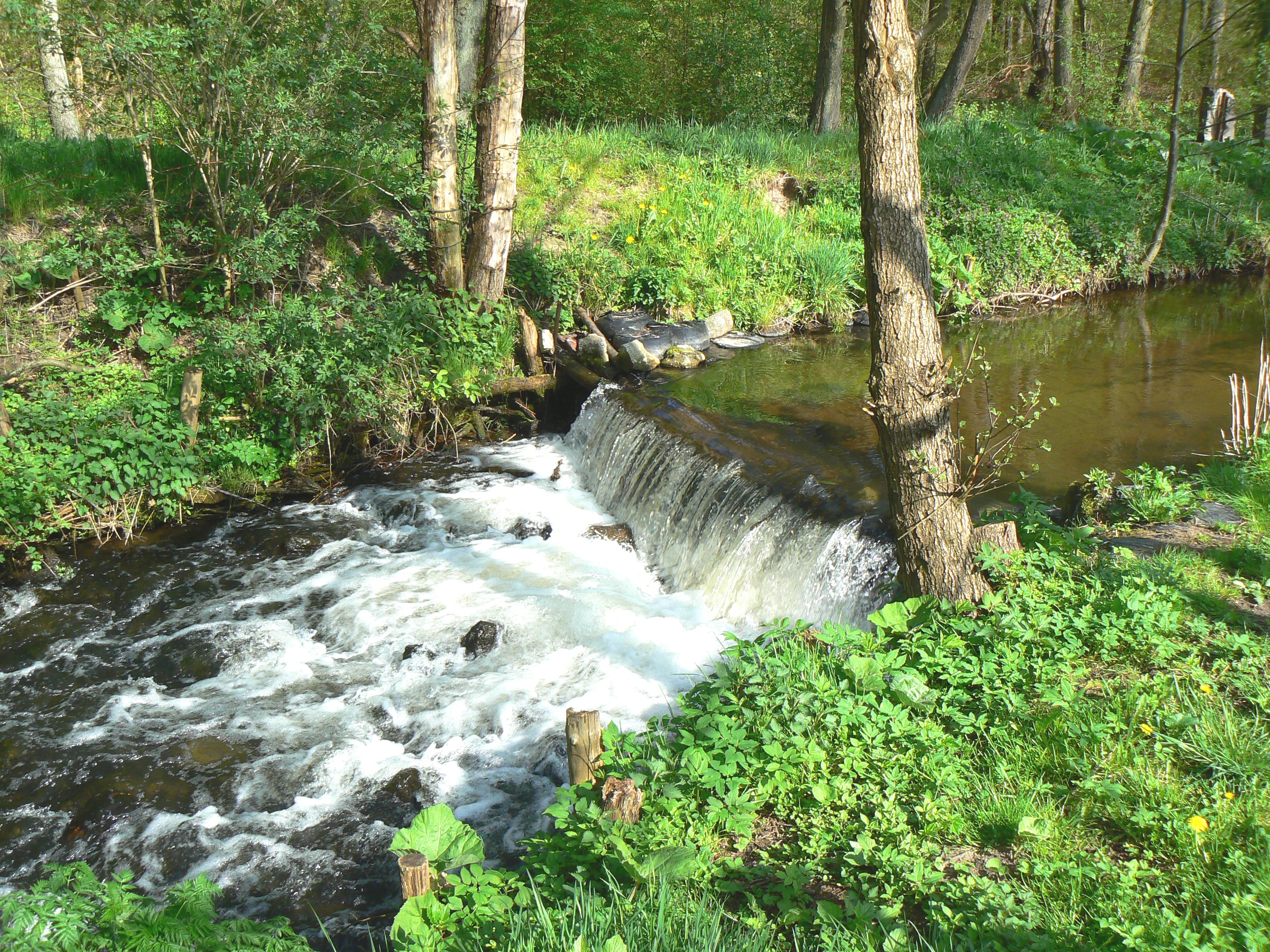

Location
- Country: Poland

Physical characteristics
- Mouth
  - location: Łeba
  - coordinates: 54°32′33″N 17°45′16″E

Basin features
- Progression: Łeba→ Baltic Sea

Okalica is a river of Poland, a tributary of the Łeba, which it meets at the town of Lębork.
