= Maciej Gołąb =

Polish musicologist (born 1952)

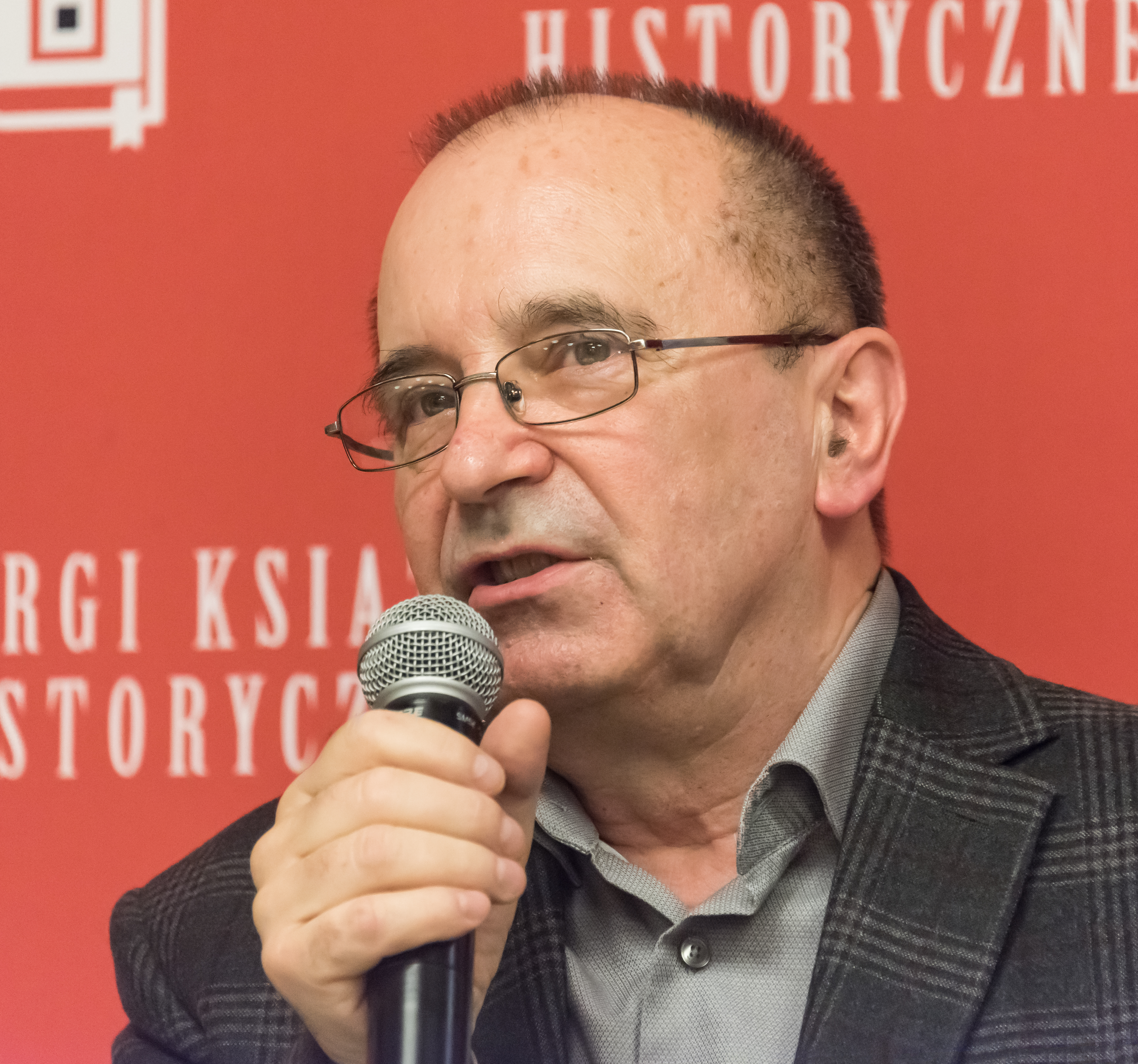
Maciej Gołąb (2022)

Maciej Gołąb (born 25 October 1952) is a Polish musicologist.

== Biography ==
Gołąb was born in Lębork (Poland) and educated at University of Warsaw, where he received his M.A. in 1976 and PhD in 1981. At University of Warsaw he studied under Józef M. Chomiński, Zofia Lissa and Anna Czekanowska and wrote his doctoral thesis on the history of the theory of twelve-tone technique. From 1978 to 2003 he taught at University of Warsaw. 2003 he joined the faculty of University of Wrocław, where he became a full professor and chairman of the Department of Musicology (until 2020). In 1999, he was visiting scholar-in-residence at Indiana University Bloomington and in 2001 visiting professor at Johannes Gutenberg-Universität Mainz (Germany).

Gołąb is a specialist in the history and theory of music of the nineteenth and twentieth centuries, Chopin studies and methodology of musicological research. His monograph about a Polish-Jewish composer Józef Koffler (1896–1944) presents Poland's first serial composer, who was murdered in the Holocaust. In his book Musical Work Analysis he develops some of Roman Ingarden’s concepts on the epistemology of an actually existing work of music. The book was awarded by the Polish Ministry of National Education (2004). The last book of Gołąb (Musical Modernism in the Twentieth Century, 2011) is a discussion of approaches to twentieth-century historiography.

From 1996 Gołąb is the Member of Editorial Board of the Musicological Quarterly "Muzyka" (Institute of Fine Arts, Polish Academy of Sciences), from 2018 "The Chopin Review" / "Studia Chopinowskie" (The Fryderyk Chopin Institute, Warsaw). From 2005 he is also General Editor of the "Musicologica Wratislaviensia" (Wrocław University Press), from 2012 - General Editor of the "Eastern European Studies in Musicology" (Peter Lang International Academic Publishers).

== Monographs in Polish ==
- Dodekafonia. Studia nad teorią i kompozycją pierwszej połowy XX wieku. Doctoral thesis, Bydgoszcz 1987, ISBN 83-7003-656-2,
- Chromatyka i tonalność w muzyce Chopina. Habilitational thesis, Warsaw 1990 (preprint), second polish edition Kraków 1991, ISBN 83-224-0449-2,
- Józef Koffler, Kraków 1995, ISBN 83-7099-030-4,
- Spór o granice poznania dzieła muzycznego, Wrocław 2003, ISBN 83-229-2400-3, second polish edition Toruń 2012, ISBN 978-83-231-2760-4,
- Józef Michał Chomiński. Biografia i rekonstrukcja metodologii, Wrocław 2008, ISSN 1895-572X,
- Muzyczna moderna w XX wieku. Między kontynuacją, nowością a zmianą fonosystemu, Wrocław 2011, ISBN 978-83-229-3249-0,
- Mazurek Dąbrowskiego. Muzyczne narodziny hymnu, Warszawa 2021, ISBN 978-83-962160-8-3,
- Chopin niedokończony. Allegro de concert op. 46 - transkrypcje i transgresje, Warszawa 2026, ISBN 978-83-68058-88-8

== Edited books in Polish ==
- Przemiany stylu Chopina. Edited by Maciej Gołąb, Kraków 1993, ISBN 83-7099-003-7,
- Muzykologia we Wrocławiu. Ludzie – historia – perspektywy. Edited by Maciej Gołąb, Wrocław 2005, ISSN 0239-6661,
- Chopin w kulturze polskiej. Edited by Maciej Gołąb, Wrocław 2009, ISSN 0239-6661.

== Main works translated into German and English ==
- Chopins Harmonik. Chromatik in ihrer Beziehung zur Tonalität. Translated by B. Hirszenberg, Köln 1995, ISBN 3-931430-00-6,
- Józef Koffler. Compositional Style and Source Documents. Translated by M. Kapelański, L. Schubert i M. Żebrowski, University of Southern California, Los Angeles 2004, ISBN 0-916545-07-5,
- Musical Work Analysis. An Epistemological Debate. Translated by W. Bońkowski, Frankfurt am Main, Berlin, Bern, Bruxelles, New York, Oxford, Wien 2008, ISBN 978-3-631-57386-0.
- Twelve Studies in Chopin. Style, Aesthetics and Reception. Translated by W. Bońkowski, J. Comber and M. Kapelański, Frankfurt am Main, Berlin, Bern, Bruxelles, New York, Oxford, Warszawa, Wien 2014, ISBN 978-3-631-65619-8.
- Musical Modernism in the Twentieth Century. Between Continuation, Innovation and Change of Phonosystem. Translated by W. Bońkowski, Frankfurt am Main, Berlin, Bern, Bruxelles, New York, Oxford, Warszawa, Wien 2015, ISBN 978-3-631-62918-5 hb.
