= Konopacki family =

Prussian noble family

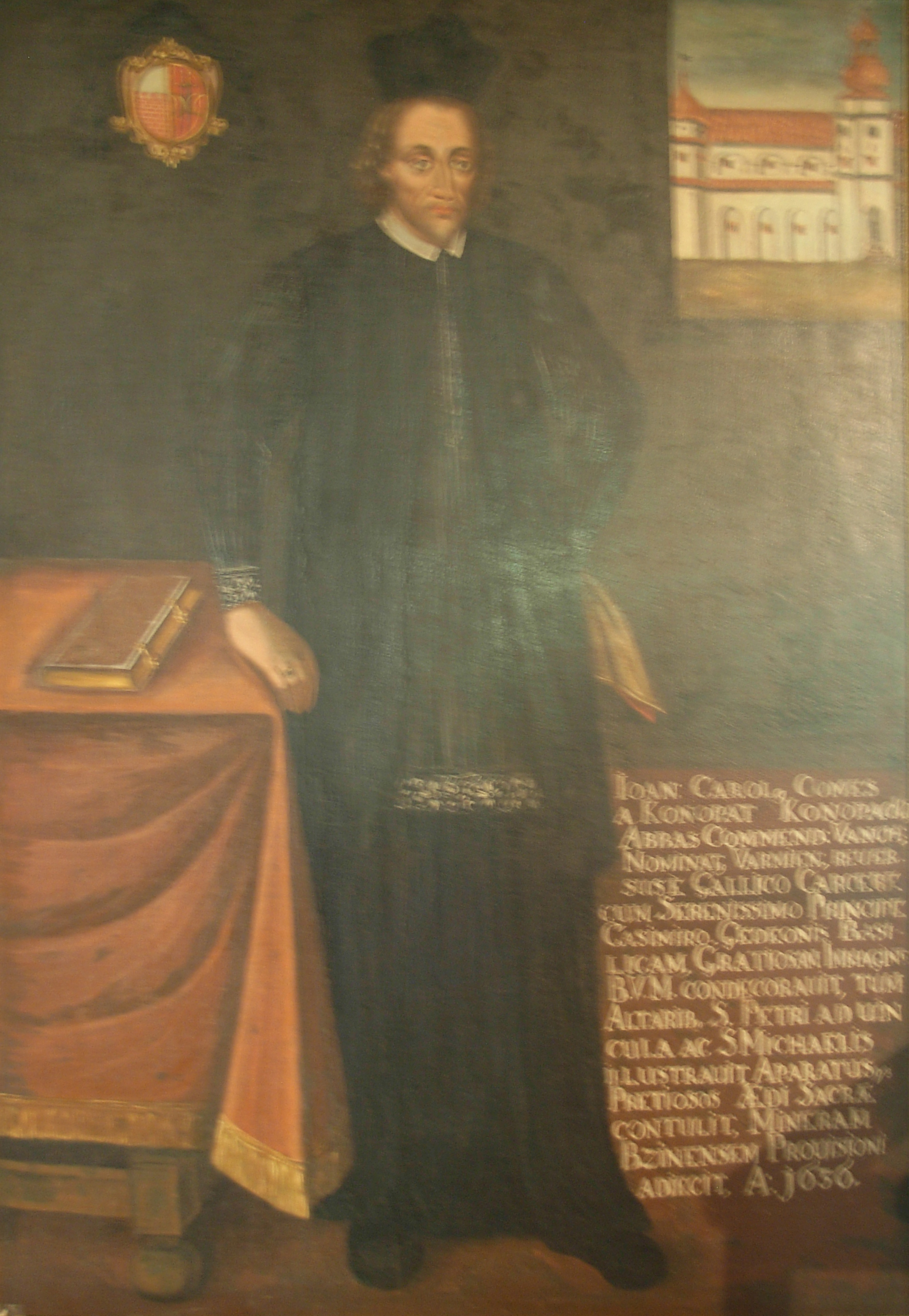
Jan Karol Konopacki, Bishop of Warmia

The House of Konopacki was a historical family of Polish Prussian nobility whose members served as senators in the Prussian provincial diet, as advisers to the King of Poland, and as Bishops of Chełm.

Notable people with surnames Konopacki or Konopacka include:

- Fabian Konopacki (born ?, died 1619) - Catholic clergyman, Deacon of Warmia, Deacon of Chełm
- Halina Konopacka (1900–1989), Polish athlete, Olympic gold medalist
- Hasan Konopacki (1879–1953), Polish Lipka Tatar politician, journalist and military officer
- Jan Konopacki (born ?, died 1530) - Royal Treasurer to the King of Poland, Bishop of Chełm, Provost of Malbork
- Mike Konopacki (born 1951), American political cartoonist
- Maciej Konopacki (born ?, died 1613) - Royal Secretary to the King of Poland, Chamberlain of Chełm, Voivode of Chełm, Bishop of Chełm.
