= Coat of arms of Lubawa =

Coat of arms of Lubawa

The coat of arms of Lubawa (German: Löbau in Westpreußen) in the Warmian-Masurian Voivodeship, Poland, depicts a bishop of Chełmno or Culm, generally identified as the first bishop, Christian of Oliva (who according to the 1216 bull by Pope Innocent III baptised the local duke of the Prussians, Surwabuno), with his right hand raised in benediction. He stands between a lime tree and a fir tree.

== Sources ==
- Andrzej Plewako, Józef Wanag, 1994: Herbarz miast polskich. Arkady
- Marian Gumowski, 1960: Najstarsze pieczęcie miast polskich XIII i XIV wieku. Towarzystwa Naukowego w Toruniu

== See also ==
- Polish heraldry
