= Tuchlino =

- Village
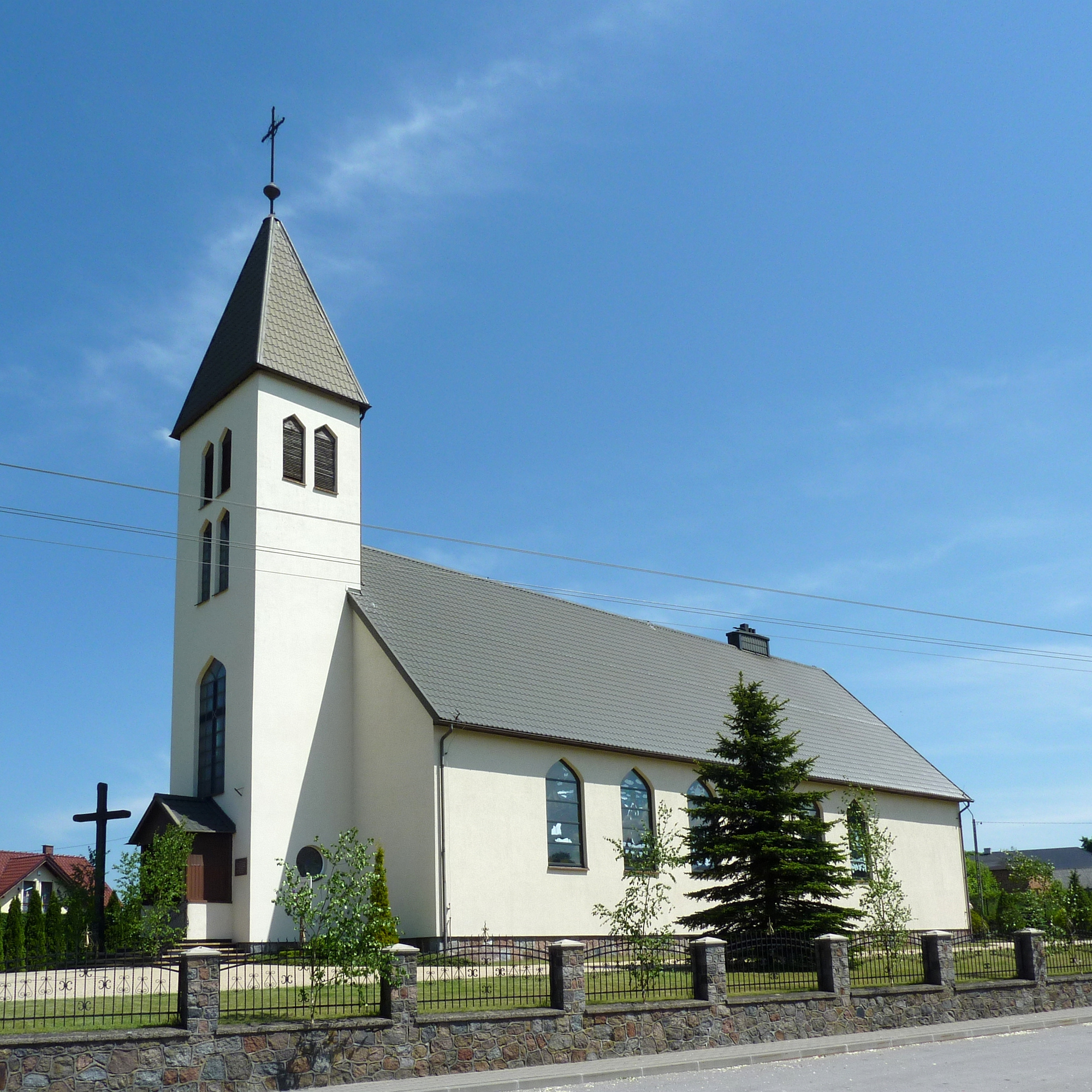
- Church of Our Lady of Częstochowa

- Location within Poland
- Coordinates: 54°18′43″N 17°51′30″E
- Country: Poland
- Voivodeship: Pomeranian
- County: Kartuzy
- Gmina: Sierakowice

Population
  - Total: 540
- Time zone: UTC+1 (CET)
  - Summer (DST): UTC+2 (CEST)
- Vehicle registration: GKA

Tuchlino [tuˈxlinɔ] is a village in the administrative district of Gmina Sierakowice, within Kartuzy County, Pomeranian Voivodeship, in northern Poland.

It is located on the eastern shore of the Tuchlińskie Lake, within the ethnocultural region of Kashubia in the historic region of Pomerania.

== History ==
Tuchlino was a private village of the Tuchliński noble family of Kownia coat of arms, administratively located in the Mirachowo County in the Pomeranian Voivodeship of the Kingdom of Poland.

During the German occupation of Poland (World War II), in 1939, some Poles from Tuchlino were among the victims of a massacre committed by the Germans in nearby Kaliska as part of the Intelligenzaktion. In 1942, the German police carried out expulsions of Poles, whose farms were then handed over to German colonists as part of the Lebensraum policy. Expelled Poles were deported to the Potulice concentration camp, and eventually enslaved as forced labour and sent either to Germany or to German colonists in the region.

== Notable residents ==
- Johannes Nepomuk von der Marwitz (1795–1886), Bishop
