= Johannes von der Marwitz =

Johannes Nepomuk von der Marwitz
- Bishop of Kulm
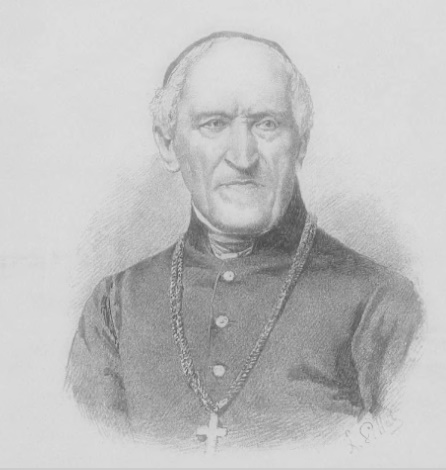
- Native name: Jan Nepomucen Marwicz
- Church: Catholic Church
- Diocese: Diocese of Kulm
- In office: 3 August 1857 – 29 March 1886
- Predecessor: Anastazy Sedlag
- Successor: Leon Redner

Orders
- Ordination: 10 April 1830
- Consecration: 8 November 1857 by Franciszek Stefanowicz

Personal details
- Born: 20 April 1795 Tuchlino, West Prussia, Kingdom of Prussia
- Died: 29 March 1886 (aged 90) Pelplin, West Prussia, Kingdom of Prussia, German Empire

Johannes Nepomuk von der Marwitz (Polish: Jan Nepomucen Marwicz) (20 April 1795 – 29 March 1886) was a German Roman Catholic priest and bishop of Kulm (Chełmno).

Marwitz was born in Tuchlin, West Prussia to Alexander von der Marwitz and Marianne née Wysocki. He grew up bilingual German and Polish and attended school in Danzig. He volunteered Blücher's Hussar Regiment No 5 in 1813 in the liberation wars against Napoleon and returned to his father's estate in 1814. Marwitz passed his Abitur in Braunsberg and studied catholic theology and philosophy at the Universities of Breslau, Bonn and in Pelplin in 1825-29.

He was ordained on 10 April 1830 at the Cathedral of Pelplin and became a Parish priest at the St. Mary’s Church of Thorn (Toruń) and in Tuchel (Tuchola) in 1832. In 1838 Marwitz became the dean of the Tuchel district, in 1839 episcopal commissioner and in 1843 cathedral canon at Cammin. In 1849 he became the dean of the Pelplin Diocese and Bishop of Culm (Chełmno) in 1857.

Throughout the Kulturkampf Marwitz was one of only three catholic bishops - out of a total of twelve - in Prussia, who remained in office and only evaded imprisonment because of his age.

Under his tenure the Collegium Marianum in Pelplin was upgraded to a Progymnasium and catholic schools and teacher’s seminaries were founded in Konitz (Chojnice) and Graudenz (Grudziądz). He determined the binding knowledge of Polish for any priest within his diocese and took care for the usage of Polish in liturgy, his pastoral letters were published bilingual

Marwitz died in Pelplin and was buried at the Pelplin Cathedral.

Catholic Church titles
Preceded by Anastasius Sedlag	Bishop of Culm; 1857–1886	Succeeded by Leo Redner
