= Antoni Mężydło =

Polish politician (born 1954)

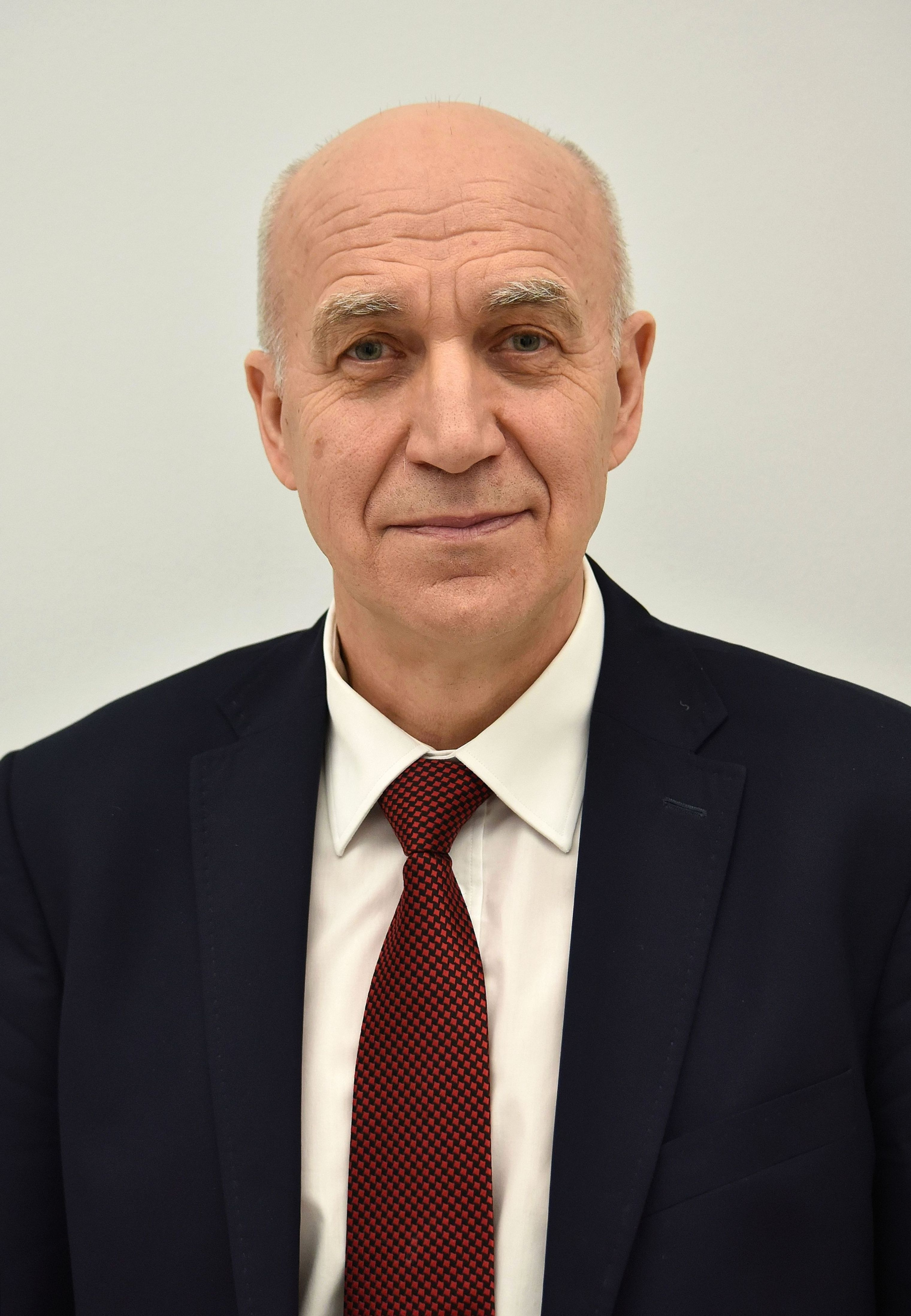

Member of the Sejm
- Incumbent
- Assumed office 19 October 2001
- Constituency: 5 – Toruń

Personal details
- Born: 23 August 1954 (age 71) Lubawa, Poland
- Party: Civic Platform

Antoni Mężydło (Polish pronunciation: [anˈtɔɲi mɛ̃ˈʐɨdwɔ]; born 23 August 1954) is a Polish politician. He was elected to the Sejm on 21 October 2007, receiving 42,052 votes in the 5 Toruń district, running on the Civic Platform list. He is active in the Central European Initiative.

He is included in the lists of Sejm 2001–2005 and Sejm 2005–2007.

== See also ==
- List of Sejm members (2005–2007)
