= Jan Konopacki =

16th century Polish bishop

Jan Konopacki (born ? - died 23 April 1530 in Lubawa) was Bishop of Culm (Chełmno) (1508–1530), Treasury of the King of Poland, Provost of Malbork. He was nominated as bishop by Pope Julius II on 23 February 1508 and was consecrated in Lubawa on 29 October by the ordinarius of the diocese of Warmia, Łukasz Watzenrode. On 18 April 1518 he served as a witness in the marriage ceremony of king Zygmunt Stary and Bona Sforza. He was also present at the signing of Treaty of Kraków and the associated Prussian Homage in 1525. In 1524, he officially condemned the Protestant Reformation.
