= Kownia coat of arms =

Polish coat of arms

Kownia
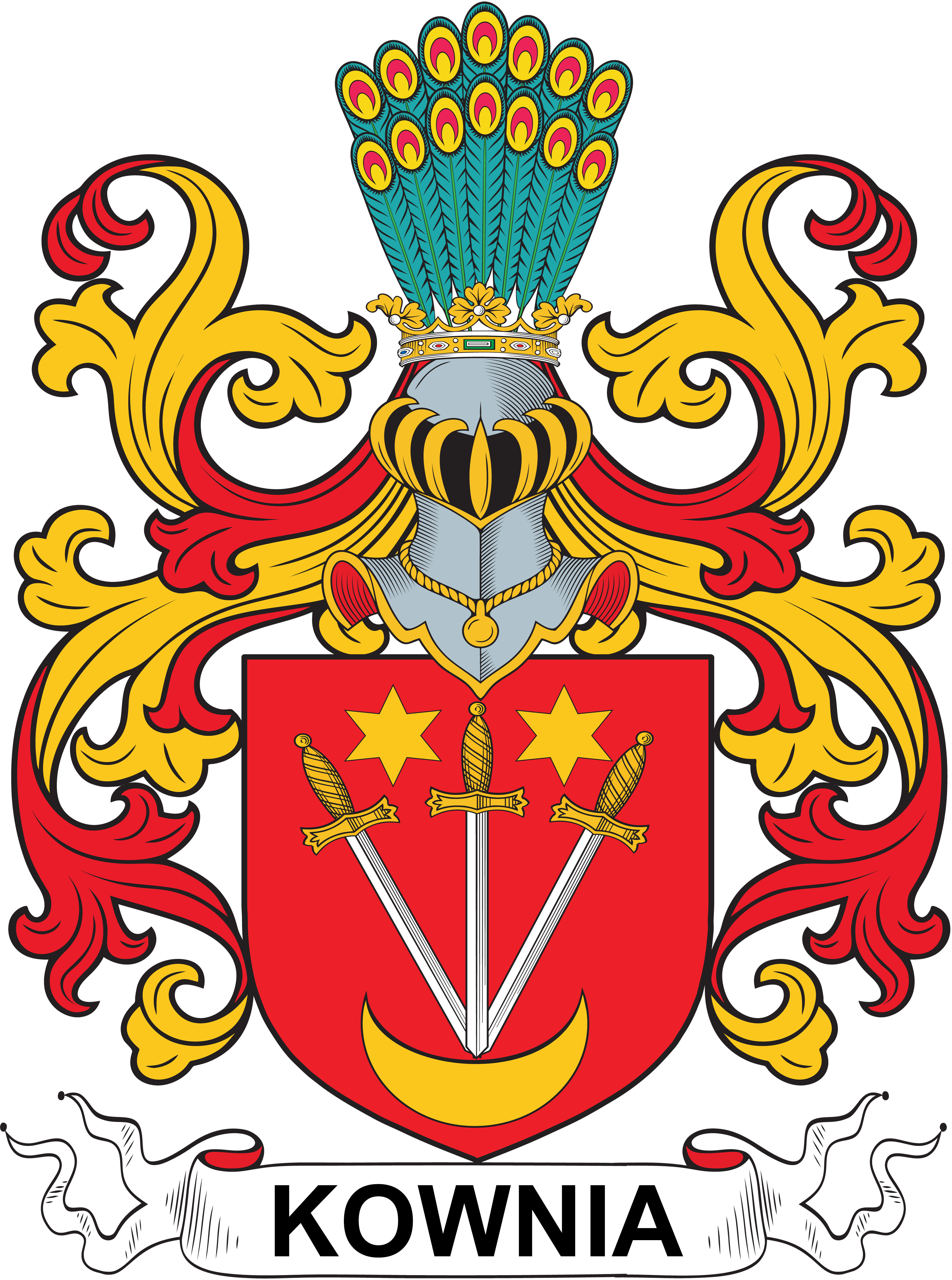
- Battle cry: Kownia, Skownia
- Alternative names: Koprzynia, Kowinia, Rownia, Równia
- Earliest mention: 1391 AD; 633 years ago; Royal mention 1570 AD; 453 years ago
- Towns: Kaunaus (Kowo in polish; Lithuania), Koprzywnica (a town in Swietokrzyskie-Poland; in 1185 Prince Cashmir II brought the Order of Cistercians here), Kowale (a village in Pomerania near Gdansk), Kowalewo Pomorskie (a town in Kuyavia-Pomerania), Kowal (a town in Kuyavia-Pomerania; Birthplace of King Cashmir III), Kowalki (a village in the administrative district of Gmina Tychowo within Bialogard county of West Pomerania; ducal seat), Rugen (Germany's largest Island; located off the Pomeranian coast in the Baltic Sea of Mecklenburg-Western Pomerania; Princely Seat)
- Families: Chodorowicz (cadet family), Czechucki (cadet family), Domaradzki (cadet family), Drużbiński (cadet family), Głębocki (cadet family), Harszmisowicz (cadet family), Juracha (cadet family), Klempicki (cadet family), Kołtunowicz (cadet family), Konwicki (cadet family), Kowieski (Parent family; Head of House Kownia), Kozakiewicz (cadet family), Kuroczycki (cadet family), Łośniewski (cadet family), Niskiewicz (cadet family), Niszkiewicz (cadet family), Pacholski (cadet family), Pachołowiecki (cadet family), Paszoch (cadet family), Paszocha (cadet family), Ptaczek (cadet family), Ptak (cadet family), Repczyński (cadet family), Stroński (cadet family), Stukrajewski (cadet family), Suskrajewski (cadet family), Tuchliński (cadet family), Tur (cadet family), Wisiecki (cadet family), Witaliszewski (cadet family), Wysiecki (cadet family), Wyszecki (cadet family), Wyżga (cadet family), Zasczyński (cadet family), Zaszczyński (cadet family)

Kownia is a Polish coat of arms. It was used by several szlachta families in the times of the Polish–Lithuanian Commonwealth.

== History ==
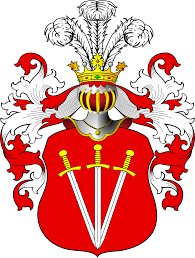
House of Kownia (Prus I; 1391 AD)

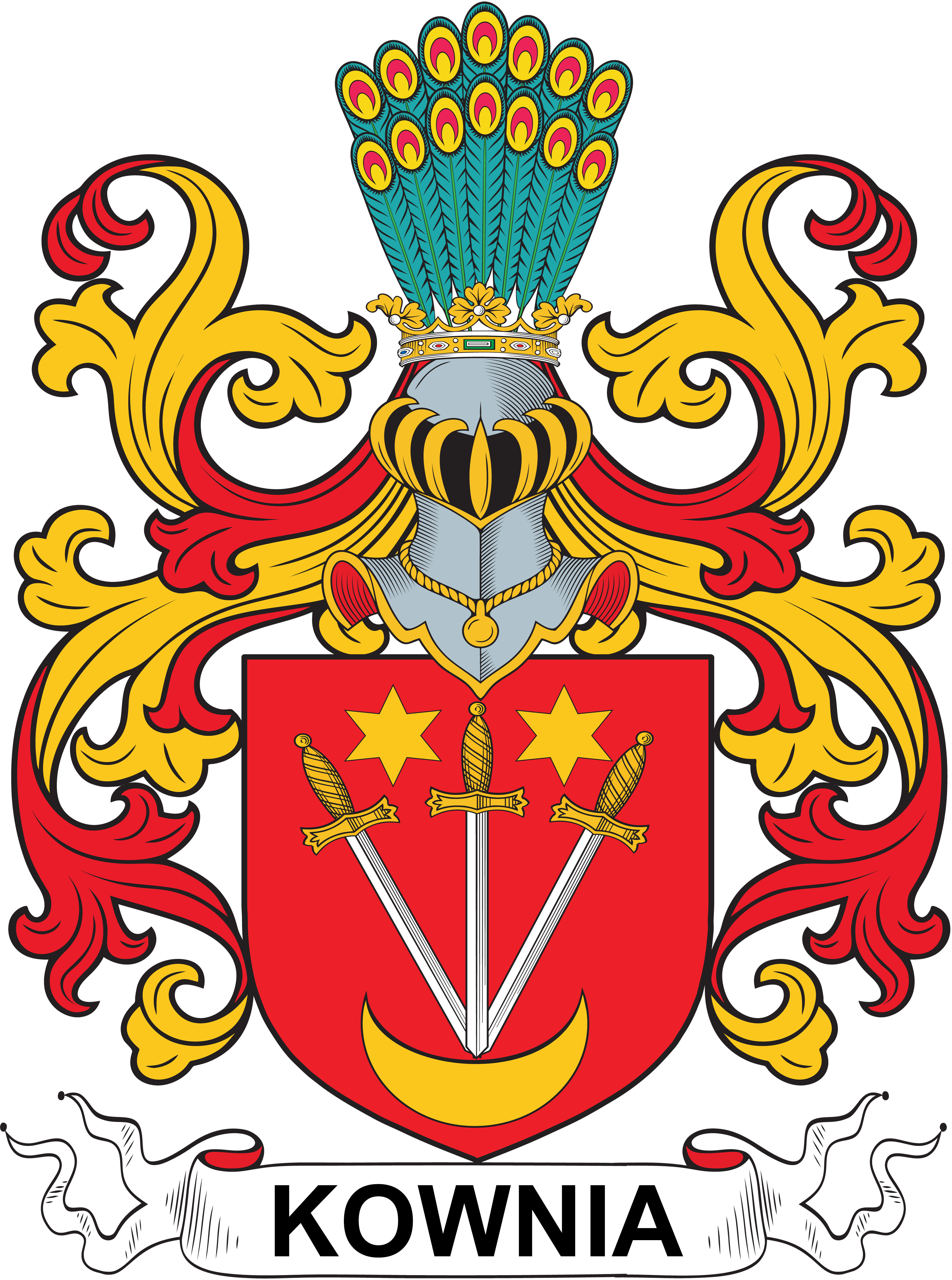
House of Kownia (Prus III; 1570 AD)

== Blazon ==
- Red field: Courage, valor, military strength, magnanimity and warriors.
- Gilded charge: Prestige, illumination, generosity, elevation of mind, faith and obedience.
- Three swords in a fan: Military prowess, defense, and sometimes justice. Their arrangement in a fan might indicate unity or a defensive posture.
- Golden stars: Hope, guidance, and divine inspiration. Their golden color signifies nobility and wealth.
- Golden crescent: Hope, new beginnings, or the divine feminine. Gold again emphasizes nobility.
- Peacock's tail: Pride, beauty, and renewal. Adorned as a crest, it indicates high rank or status. Known as being "In Pride" and having a reputation for grace and dignity.
- Crowned helmet: Royalty, sovereignty, or high authority.
- Red labels, gilded charges: Red and gold together emphasize nobility, royalty and gentry.

Further Interpretations

- Military prowess and nobility: The red field, swords, and crowned helmet strongly suggest a military background, high social status, nobility and royalty.
- Hope and divine guidance: The golden stars and crescent indicates a sense of optimism and reliance on higher powers.
- Pride and authority: The peacock's tail and crowned helmet emphasize a strong sense of family, leadership and connection to the church. This is often called being "In Pride".

== Notable bearers ==
Notable bearers of this coat of arms include:

Andrew Michael Parrillo-Kowieski, through private treaty, freehold law, matrilineally lineage and male primogeniture, claimed the hereditary title of 'Headship of House Kownia', in July 2024. On August 14th 2024, Andrew Michael Parrillo-Kowieski publicly assumed the titular title of, Duke of West Pomerania. Upon assumption, the style of the customary title, Prince of Rügen, was reverted as a synecdoche.

== See also ==
- Coat of arms
- Heraldry
- Polish heraldry
