= Lubawa =

Town in Warmian-Masurian Voivodeship, Poland

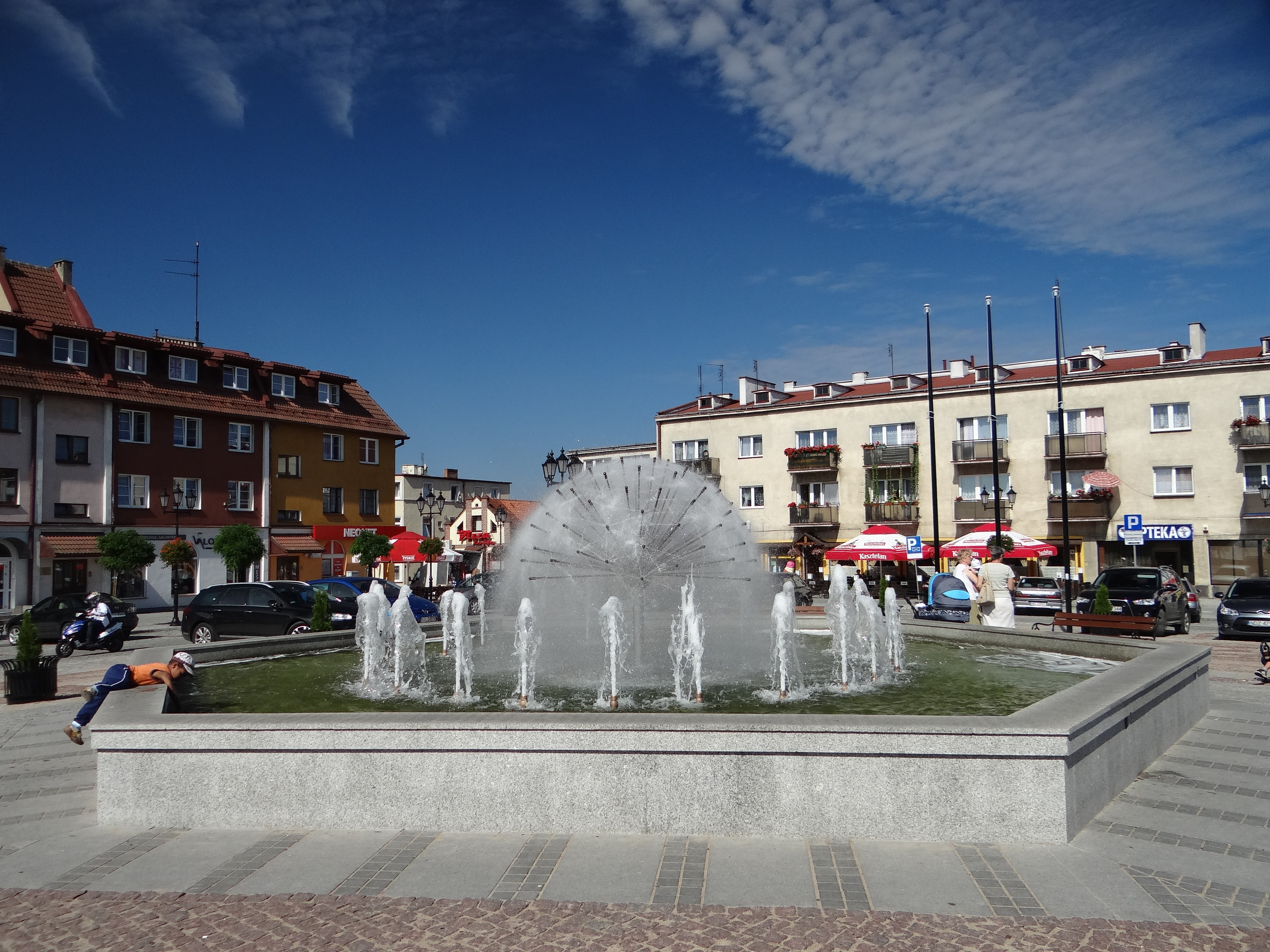
- Central square, with fountain

- Flag Coat of arms

- Location within Poland
- Coordinates: 53°30′N 19°45′E
- Country: Poland
- Voivodeship: Warmian-Masurian
- County: Iława
- Gmina: Lubawa (urban gmina)
- Established: 1216
- Town rights: 1260

Government
  - Mayor: Maciej Radtke

Area
  - Total: 16.84 km^{2} (6.50 sq mi)
- Elevation: 145 m (476 ft)

Population (2025)
  - Total: 10,007
  - Density: 594.2/km^{2} (1,539/sq mi)
- Time zone: UTC+1 (CET)
  - Summer (DST): UTC+2 (CEST)
- Postal code: 14-260
- Area code: +48 55
- Car plates: NIL
- Website: http://www.lubawa.pl

Lubawa (Polish pronunciation: [luˈbava]; German: Löbau in Westpreußen; Old Prussian: Lūbawa) is a town in the Warmian-Masurian Voivodeship, in northern Poland. It is located in Iława County on the Sandela River, some 18 km (11 mi) southeast of Iława.

Lubawa is a member of Cittaslow.

== Geographical location ==
Lubawa is located in Chełmno Land, approximately 15 kilometres (9 miles) north-east of the town of Nowe Miasto Lubawskie, 55 kilometres (34 miles) south-west of the town of Olsztyn and 115 km (71 miles) south-east of the regional centre of Gdańsk, at an altitude of 145 metres (476 feet) above sea level.

== History ==
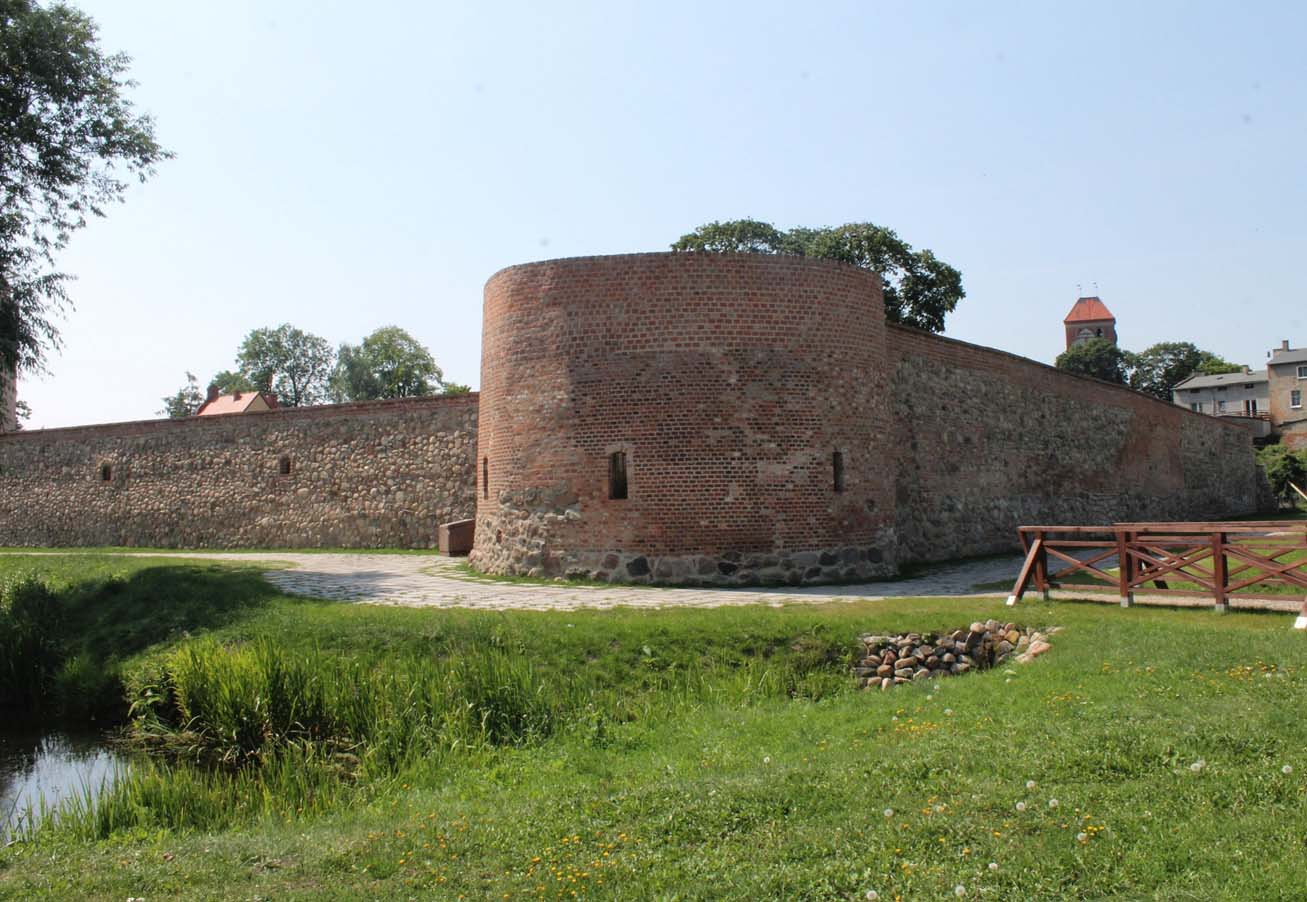
Remains of the Lubawa Castle

In 1214 the local Prussian landlord Surwabuno was christened by Christian of Oliva, the first Catholic bishop of Prussia. The latter is nowadays featured on the coat of arms of Lubawa. The town was first mentioned in a papal bull of January 18, 1216, issued by Pope Innocent III. Soon afterwards a wooden castle was built. Within the monastic state of the Teutonic Knights, the Bishopric of Culm was created in 1243 by William of Modena. In 1257 the town became a property of the church and the seat of the bishops of Culm (Chełmno). In 1268 the castle was destroyed. Between 1301 and 1326 a new castle was built of stone by the local bishop named Arnold. In 1330 it was destroyed by an invasion of Lithuanian forces of Gediminas, but was rebuilt. The town of Löbau was captured by the Kingdom of Poland after the Battle of Grunwald in 1410 but returned to the Teutonic Order once the Polish-Lithuanian-Teutonic War ended. However the surrounding Land of Lubawa had gone partially to Masovia in the south.

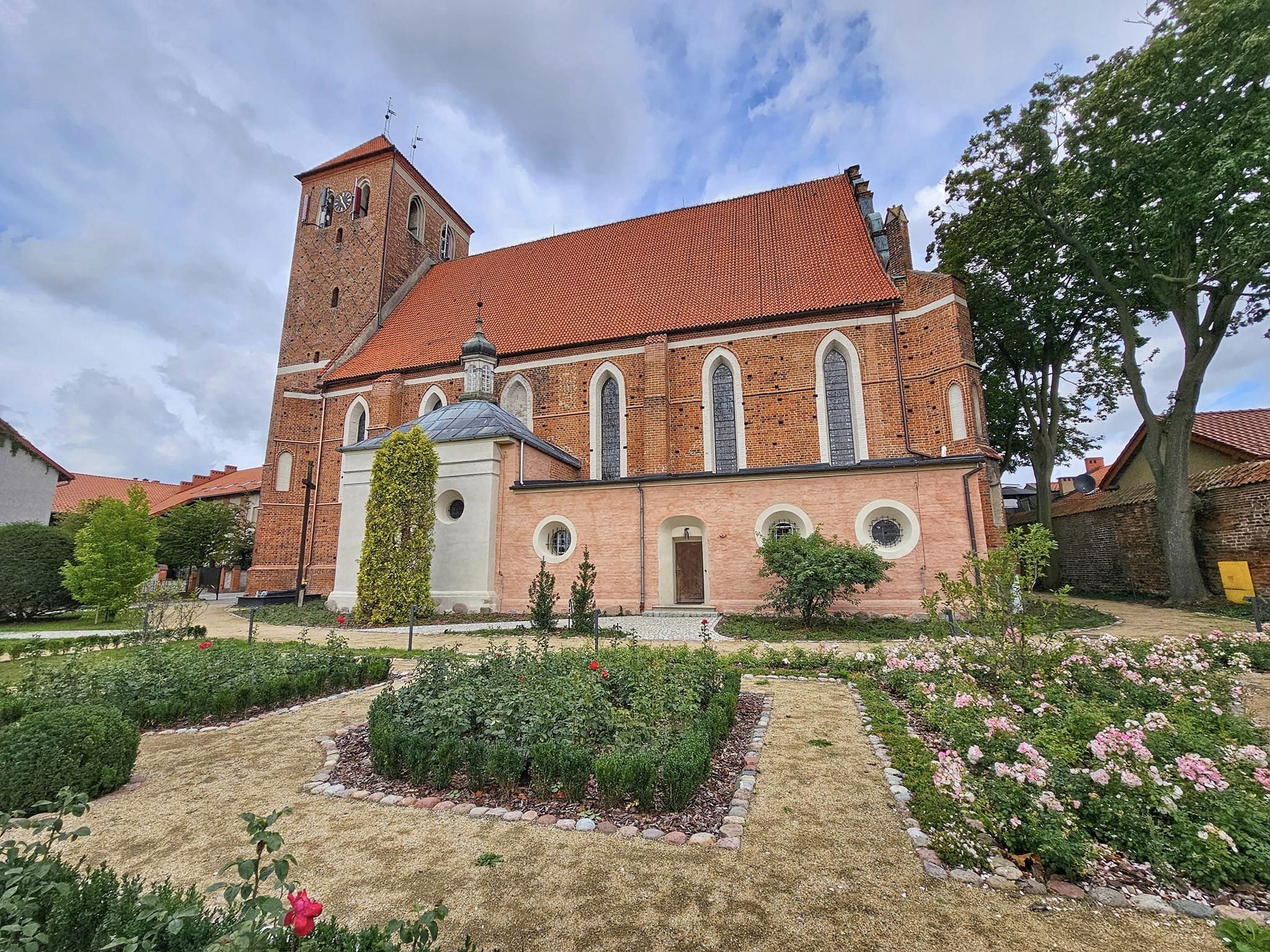
Gothic church St. Anna in Lubawa (1330).

In 1440 the town joined the anti-Teutonic Prussian Confederation, at the request of which King Casimir IV Jagiellon signed the act of incorporation of the region and town to Poland in 1454. In the beginning of the Thirteen Years' War in 1454, the pro-Polish troops took over the local castle. The incorporation of the town to Poland was confirmed in the Second Peace of Toruń in 1466. It was part of the Chełmno Voivodeship and soon afterwards became a centre of local trade and commerce. As such it became one of the seats of the bishops of Chełmno. In 1533 it was razed to the ground by a great fire mentioned by Erasmus of Rotterdam, but it was soon rebuilt and between 1535 and 1539 Nicolaus Copernicus visited the bishop's castle in Lubawa several times. At that time, the castle also housed an astronomical observatory. It was in Lubawa that the decision was made to publish Copernicus' groundbreaking work De revolutionibus orbium coelestium. In 1545 the town and the castle were yet again destroyed by a fire.

The town gained significant profits from the trade. In 1627 the castle was refurbished and became a Baroque style palace of Bishop Jakub Zadzik. By 1640 construction of water works and sewers had been completed. The town was annexed by the Kingdom of Prussia in 1772 through the First Partition of Poland. Part of the Duchy of Warsaw (1807–13) during the Napoleonic Wars, the town was again annexed by the Kingdom of Prussia after the dissolution of the duchy. In 1815 the palace was destroyed by a fire and in 1826 its walls were demolished. In 1820 the convent of the Benedictine Confederation was suppressed. The population was subjected to Germanisation policies. In 1831, several Polish infantry and artillery units, engineer corps, sappers and general staff of the November Uprising stopped in the town on the way to their internment places. In 1871 it became a part of the Prussian-led German Empire. During the Partitions of Poland, and until 1920, Löbau belonged to Kreis Löbau in Regierungsbezirk Marienwerder in the Province of West Prussia. According to the German census of 1890, the town had a population of 4,593, of which 2,300 (50.1%) were Poles.

As a consequence of the Treaty of Versailles following the rebirth of sovereign Poland the town was re-incorporated into Poland.

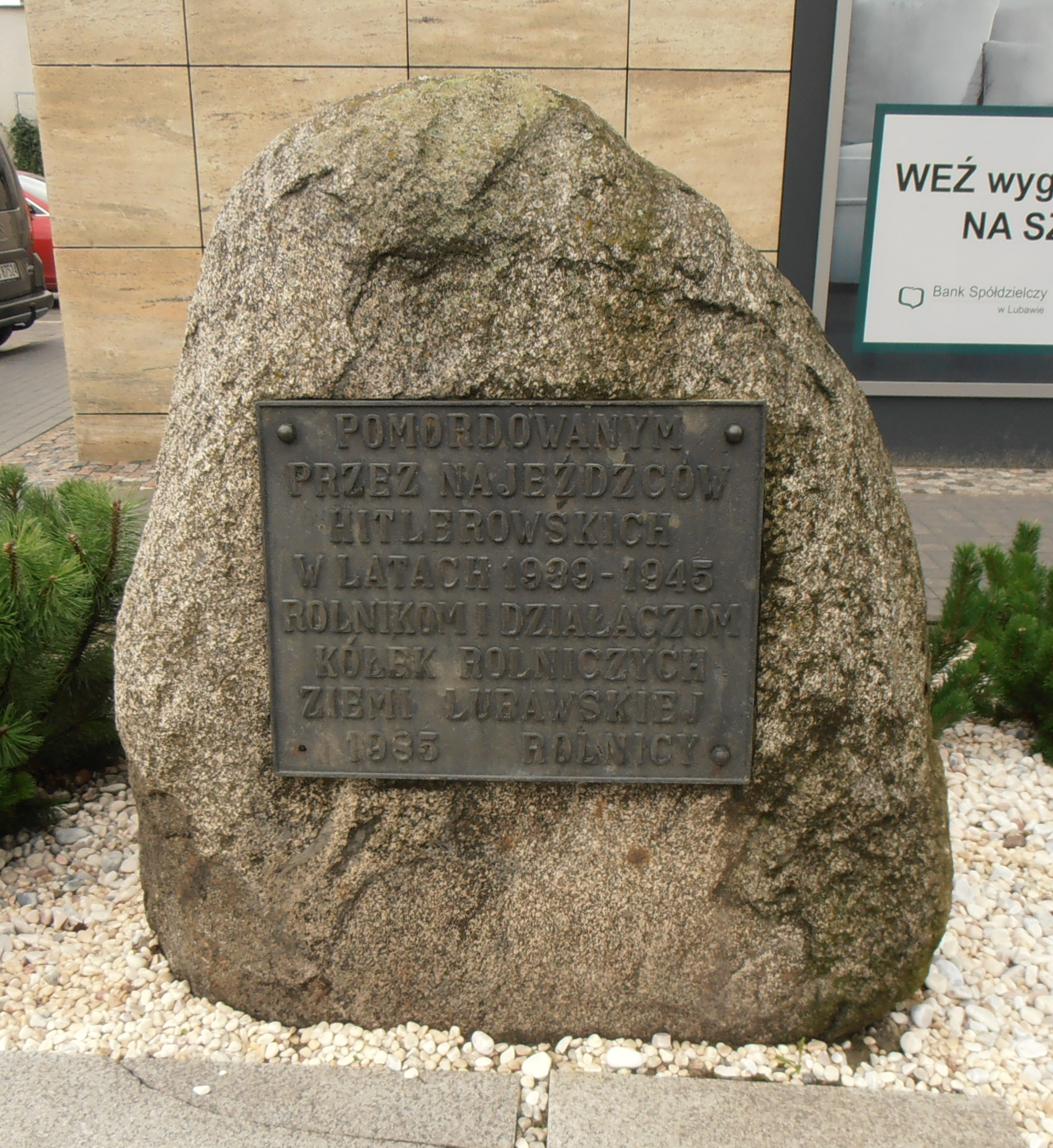
A memorial stone dedicated to Polish farmers of the Lubawa Land murdered by Nazi Germans during the German occupation of Poland

Following the 1939 invasion of Poland, which started World War II, the region was occupied by Nazi Germany, and from 26 October 1939 to 1945 as Löbau was administered as part of Regierungsbezirk Marienwerder in the new province of Reichsgau Danzig-West Prussia. The Polish population was subjected to various repressions and atrocities. The Einsatzgruppe V carried out mass searches of houses, offices etc. in September 1939. On 7 December 1939, the Selbstschutz carried out a public execution of 10 Polish inhabitants. The German Nazi regime housed a secret camp in the town for Polish children and teenagers aged 10–17, mostly boys. The children were subjected to forced labour, beatings, malnutrition and even executions. Children reaching the age of majority were deported to the Stutthof concentration camp and its subcamps. With the approaching Eastern Front, the camp was dissolved in January 1945 and the remaining children were deported to Germany. After the end of war, Lubawa was again part of Poland where it remained since then.

== Economy ==
Lubawa is an important centre of furniture industry. Also, a "Lubawa S.A." company is located there, which is producer of military equipment such as bulletproof vests, currently used by the Polish Army and the Polish press.

== Tourism ==
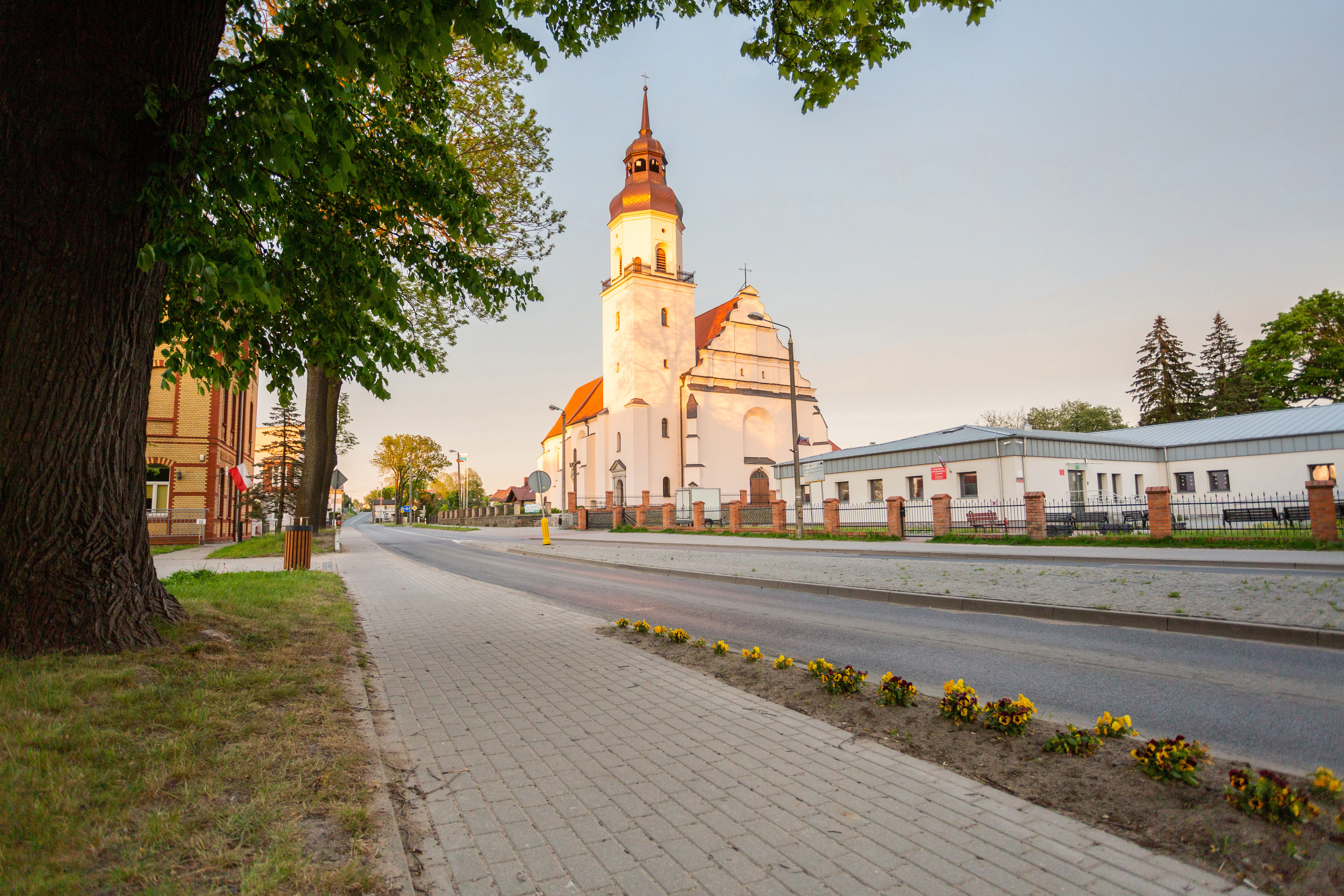
Church of St. John

Lubawa is a centre of local tourism. The "Wzgórza Lubawskie" forest reserve is located only some ten kilometres (6.2 miles) westwards and the picturesque Drwęca River flows some five kilometres (3.1 miles) to the west. Also, the nearby battlefield of the Battle of Grunwald attracts many tourists, both from Poland and from abroad, mostly from Germany.

Notable heritage sights and landmarks:

- Monument to Polish child prisoners of Nazi Germany
- Two 15th-century towers
- Parts of city walls from the 14th century
- Ruins of a Gothic castle
- Gothic St. Anne's Church from 1330
- St. John's Church from 1496 to 1507, rebuilt in 1603–10 in Renaissance style.
- Wooden Church of St. Barbara from 1770 to 1779, built in Baroque style.
- 19th-century houses
- Łazienki Miejskie park
- Church of the Visitation in Lubawa Lipy
- Remnants of wooden sewer system, designed by Nicolaus Copernicus according to urban legend

== Sports ==
Local sports clubs include football club Motor Lubawa, which competes in the lower leagues, and athletics club LKS Lubawa.

== Notable residents ==
- Harris Newmark (1834–1916), German-American businessman in Los Angeles
- Leopold Harris (1836–1910), founder of the Harris & Frank department stores in Los Angeles, and Benno Jastrowitz, his business partner and Minna Jastrowitz, his wife
- The Jacoby brothers, founders of another major department store in Los Angeles from 1879 through 1938.
- Gerhard Wilck (1898–1985), Wehrmacht officer
- Antoni Mężydło (1954–), Polish politician
- Jacek Fafiński (1970–), Polish wrestler
- Grzegorz Gwiazdowski (1974–), Polish cyclist
