= Diocese of Chełmno =

Former Roman Catholic diocese in Poland

Diocese of Chełmno Diecezja chełmińska
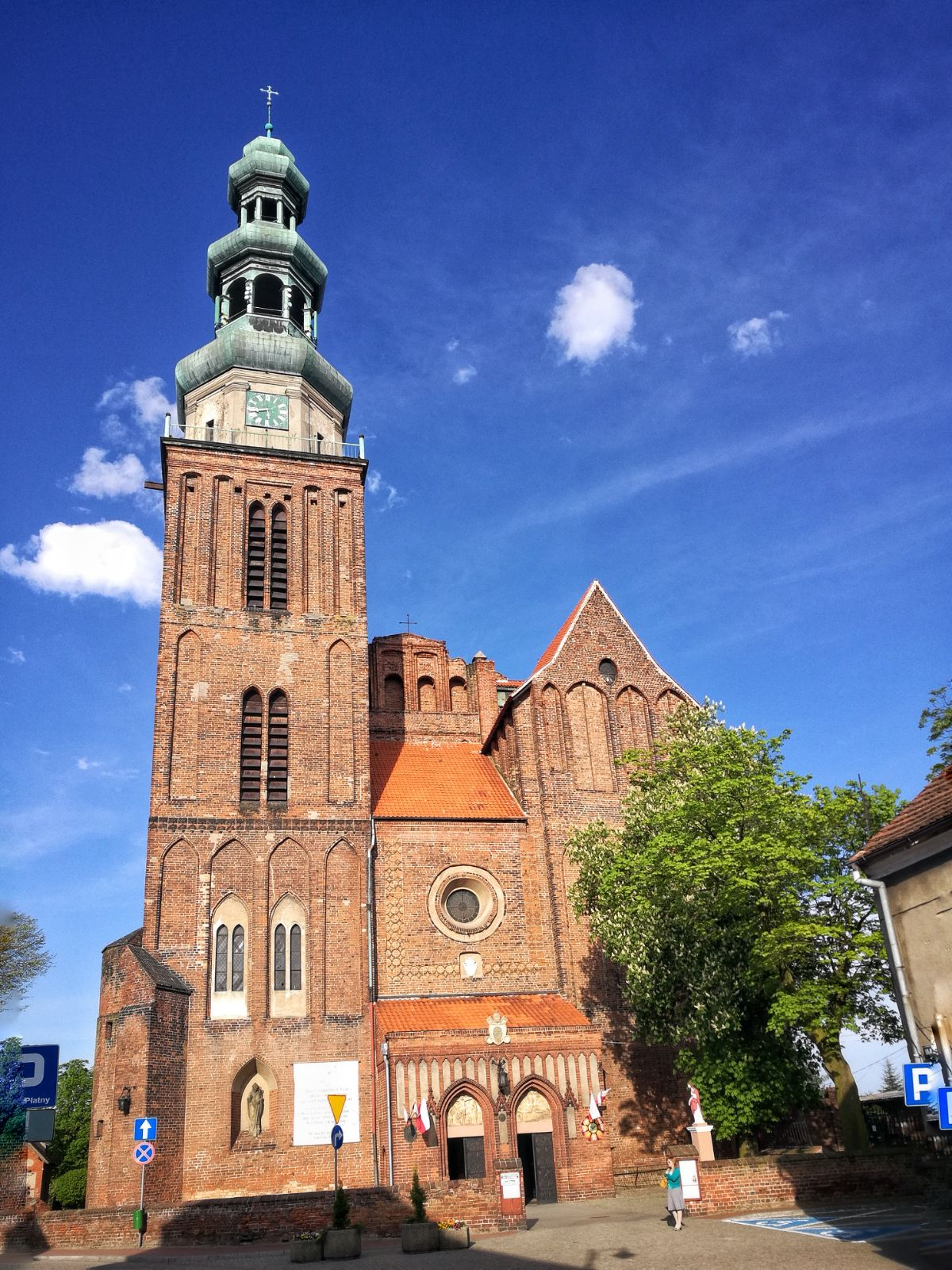
- Former Cathedral in Chełmża

Location
- Country: Poland
- Ecclesiastical province: Gniezno
- Coordinates: 53.2°N 18.6°E

Information
- Denomination: Catholic
- Rite: Latin Rite
- Established: 1243
- Dissolved: 1992
- Cathedral: Chełmża Cathedral (until 1821); Pelplin Cathedral (1821–1992)

The Diocese of Chełmno (Polish: Diecezja chełmińska; German: Bistum Kulm/Culm) was a Catholic diocese in Chełmno Land, founded in 1243 and disbanded in 1992.

== History ==
- It was founded in 1243 by the papal legate William of Modena in the Monastic state of the Teutonic Knights, along with the three other bishoprics Ermland (Warmia), Samland (in Sambia) and Pomesania. Initially Culm was a suffragan to the Archdiocese of Riga and had its seat in Chełmża (Culmsee), where the cathedral chapter was domiciled till 1824.

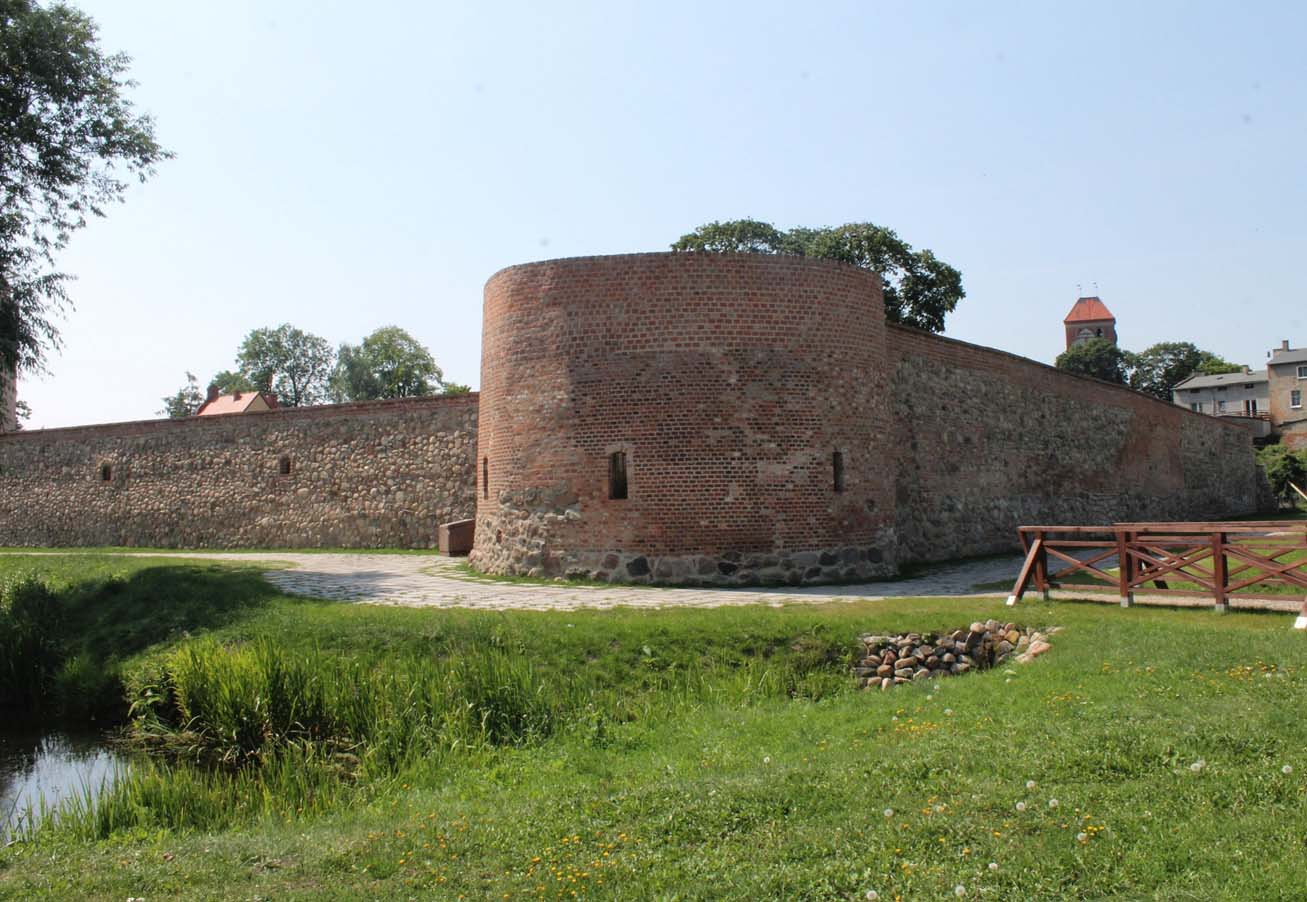
Remains of the Lubawa Castle, former residence of the Bishops of Chełmno

- From 1257 to 1782 the bishops resided primarily at the castle in Lubawa, then from 1782 to 1824 their seat became Chełmża.
- In 1454, the region was reincorporated by King Casimir IV Jagiellon to the Kingdom of Poland.
- In 1466, the region was confirmed as part of Poland, and the diocese was agreed to pass to the Archdiocese of Gniezno.
- After 1525 Chełmno incorporated southern parts of the Pomesanian diocesan area (with Łasin and Nowe Miasto), which happened to be in the Chełmno Voivodeship. Whereas western Pomesanian diocesan area in the Malbork Voivodeship was administered by Chełmno, but officially maintaining its naming.
- After Riga's dissolution in 1566 the bishops of Chełmno attended the councils of the ecclesiastical province of the metropolitan of Gniezno. This practice was recognised by the Holy See by the Bull De salute animarum in 1821, when Chełmno became de jure a suffragan of the Archdiocese of Gniezno. Chełmno diocese was enlarged on that occasion (Górzno, Krajna and Działdowo).
- Annexation of the diocesan area in the First Partition of Poland in 1772 and Second Partition of Poland in 1793 by the Kingdom of Prussia.

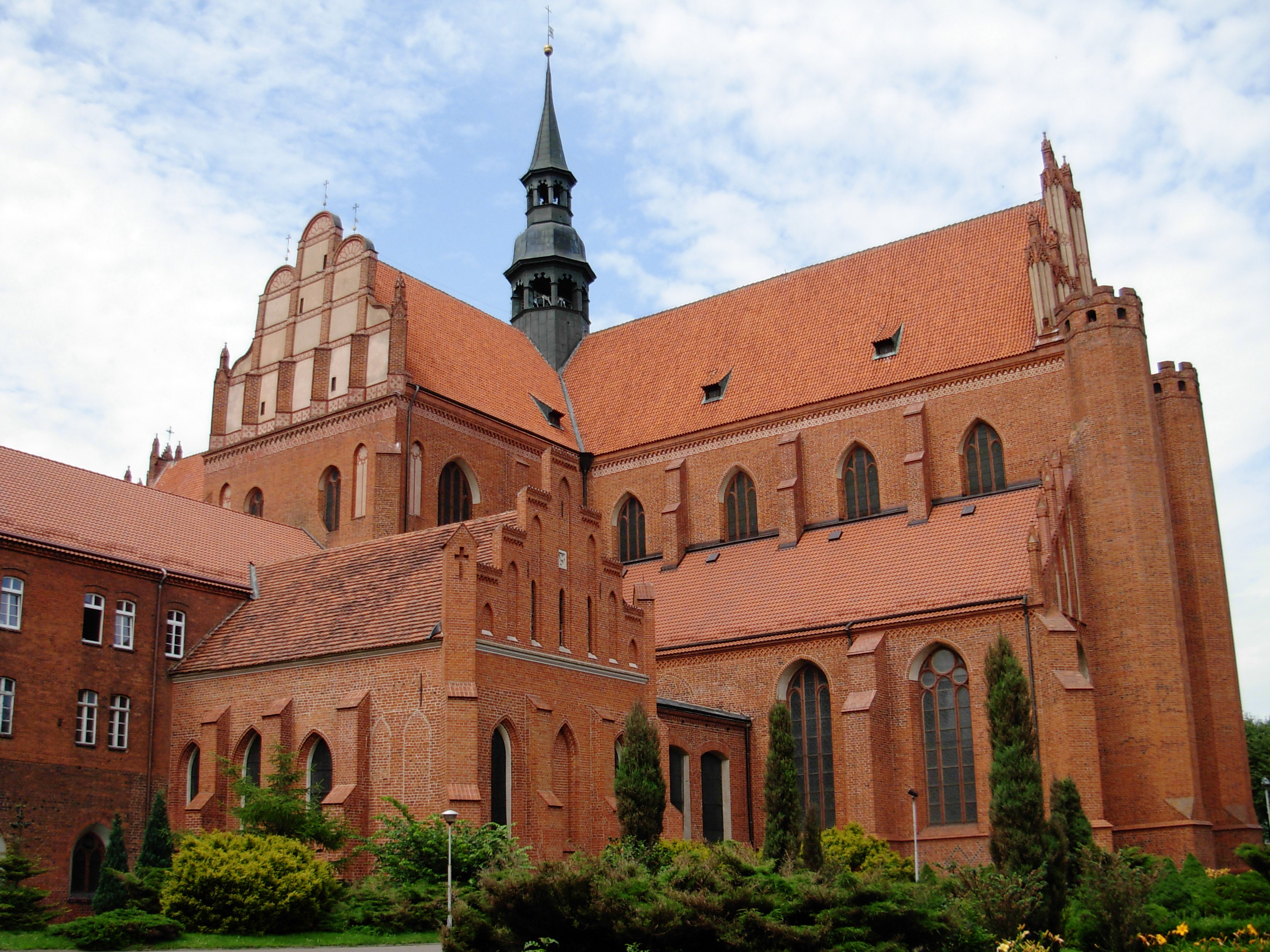
Pelplin Cathedral, seat of the diocese in 1821–1992, listed as a Historic Monument of Poland.

- In 1824, episcopal seat moved to Pelplin.
- In 1871, the diocesan area became part of Germany.
- Restoration of independent Poland after World War I; reintegration of Chełmno with Poland in 1920.
- Pope Pius XI decided to separate 18 parishes in the territory the Free City of Danzig west of the Vistula from the diocese and to establish an Apostolic Administrator of the Free City of Danzig on 24 April 1922, which was directly subordinated to the Pope.
- On 1 May 1923 the Holy See disentangled from the Diocese of Chełmno the deaneries in Bütow (Bytów), Lauenburg in Pomerania (Lębork) as well as those included in the Posen-West Prussia Border March, and transferred them to the new Apostolic Administration of Tütz, later transformed into the Prelature of Schneidemühl (Piła).
- In 1925 a concordat between Poland and the Holy See was signed and the Apostolic Administrator was now supposed to be subordinated to the Nuncio of Warsaw, which caused protests among the local populace. Thus, the Pope established the sui iuris Diocese of Danzig on 30 December 1925 and appointed Edward O'Rourke as the first Bishop on 2 January 1926. The deanery of Pomesania in that eastern part of West Prussia which remained with Germany after the 1920 East and West Prussian plebiscites was transferred to the Diocese of Warmia in 1925.
- As part of the reorganisation of the Catholic Church in the People’s Republic of Poland in 1972, also accounting for changes of political border in 1945, the diocese of Gdansk was enlarged on the expenses of Chelmno diocese, whereas the latter gained parishes previously part of the Berlin diocese and the Prelature of Schneidemühl (Piła)
- As part of the reorganisation of the Catholic Church in the Third Polish Republic, the extant Diocese of Chełmno was split in 1992 by Pope John Paul II into the Diocese of Pelplin and the Diocese of Toruń

== List of Bishops of Kulm/Chełmno ==
- 1245–1263: Heidenreich Ordo fratrum Praedicatorum, Dominican Order (O.P.)
- 1264–1274: Friedrich von Hausen Ordo Teutonicus, Teutonic Order (O.T.)
- 1275–1291: Werner OT
- 1291/92–1301: Heinrich Schenk OT
- 1303–1311: Herman OT
- 1311–1316/19: Eberhard OT
- 1319–1323: Mikołaj Afri OP
- 1323–1349: Otto OT
- 1349–1359: Jacob OT
- 1359–1363: Johann Schadland OP
- 1363–1381/85: Wikbold Dobilstein OT
- 1385–1390: Reinhard von Sayn
- 1390: Martin von Lynow OT
- 1390–1398: Nikolaus Schippenbeil OT
- 1398–1402: Jan Kropidło
- 1402–1416: Arnold Stapil OT
- 1416–1457: Johann Marienau
- 1457–1479: Wincenty Kiełbasa
- 1480–1495: Stefan of Nibork
- 1496–1507: Mikołaj Chrapicki
- 1508–1530: Jan Konopacki

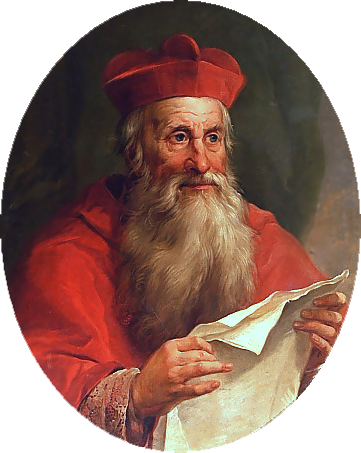
Stanislaus Hosius, first Bishop of Chełmno later promoted to cardinal

- 1530–1538: Johannes Dantiscus
- 1538–1549: Tiedemann Giese
- 1549–1551: Stanislaus Hosius
- 1551–1562: Jan Lubodzieski
- 1562–1571: Stanisław Żelisławski SOC
- 1574–1595: Piotr Kostka
- 1595–1600: Piotr Tylicki
- 1600–1610: Wawrzyniec Gembicki
- 1611–1613: Maciej Konopacki
- 1614–1624: Jan Kuczborski
- 1624–1635: Jakub Zadzik
- 1635–1639: Jan Lipski
- 1639–1646: Kasper Działyński
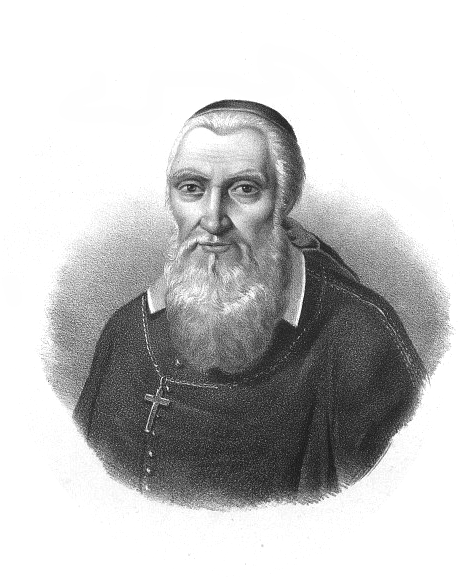
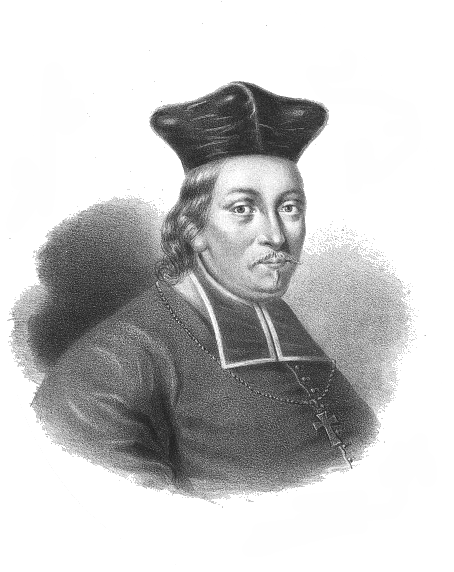
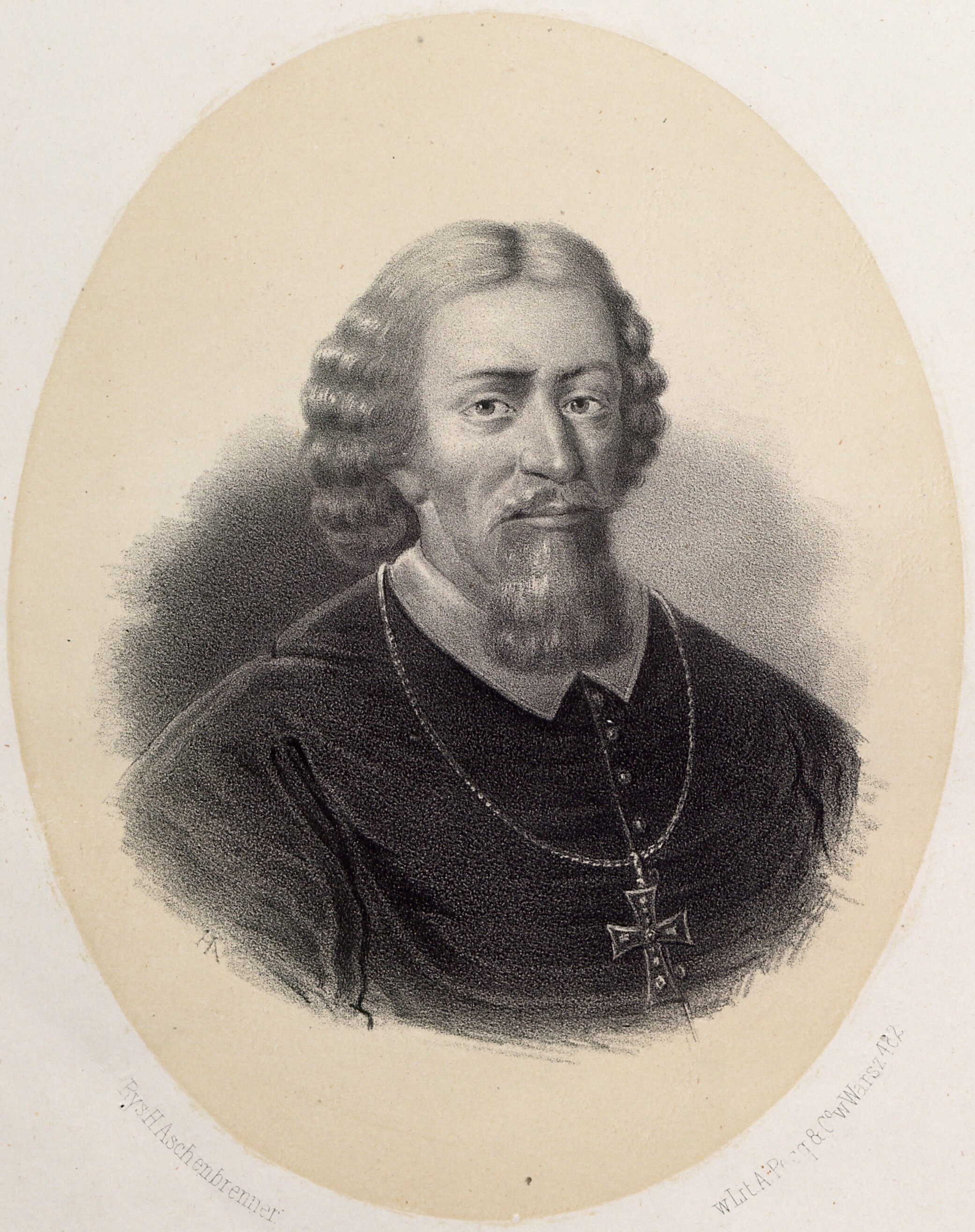
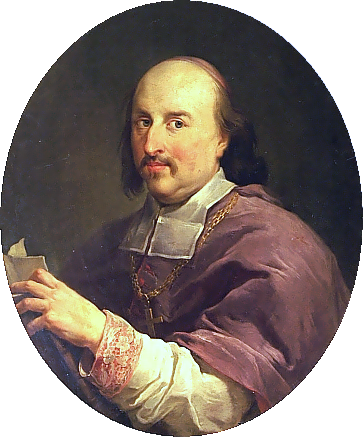
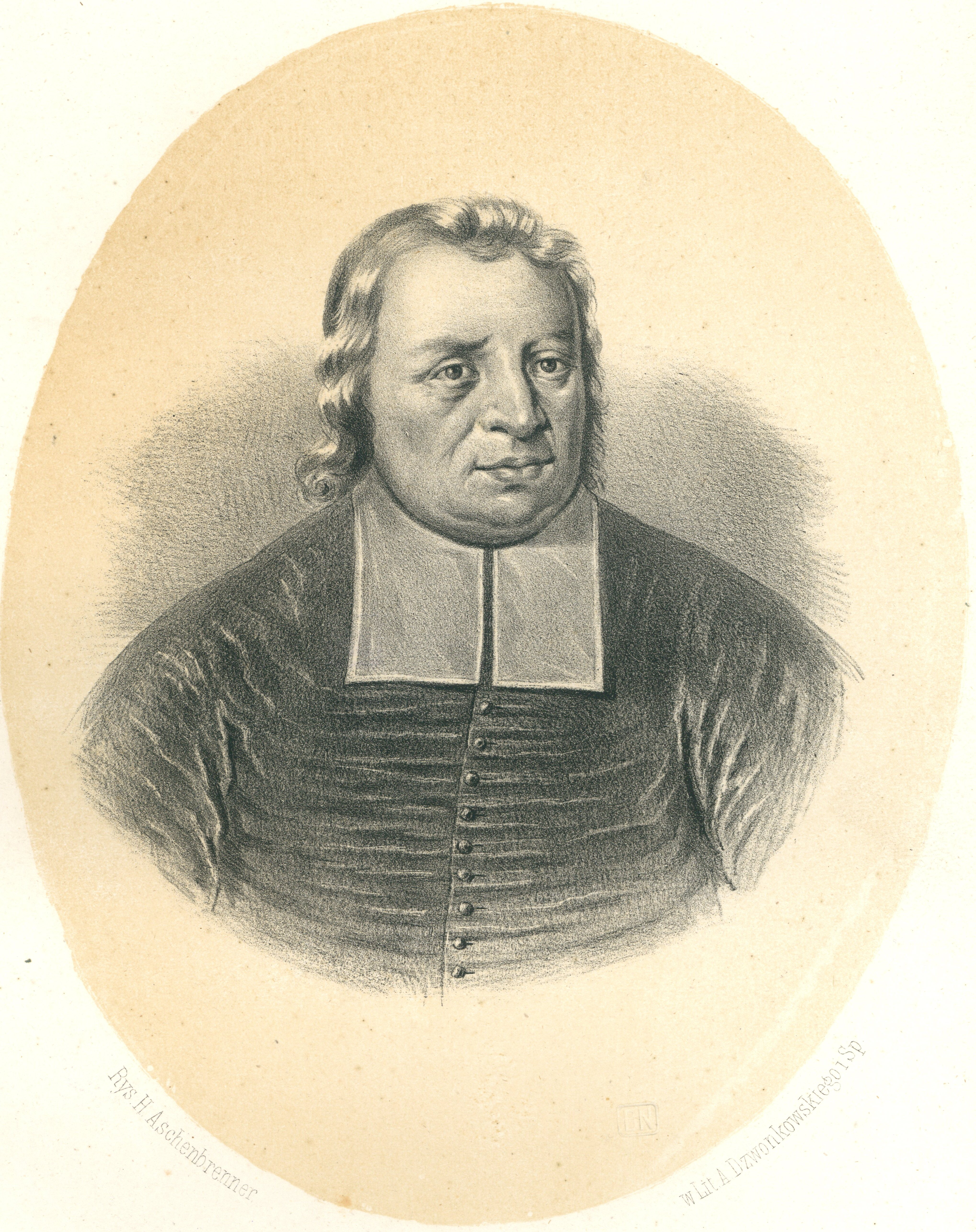
Wawrzyniec Gembicki, Jan Lipski, Andrzej Leszczyński, Andrzej Olszowski, Teodor Andrzej Potocki, bishops of Chełmno later promoted to Primates of Poland
- 1646–1652: Andrzej Leszczyński
- 1653–1655: Jan Gembicki
- 1658–1661: Adam Koss
- 1662–1674: Andrzej Olszowski
- 1676–1681: Jan Małachowski
- 1681–1693: Kazimierz Jan z Bnina Opaliński
- 1693–1694: Kazimierz Jan Szczuka
- 1699–1712: Teodor Andrzej Potocki
- 1719–1721: Jan Kazimierz de Alten Bokum
- 1723–1730: Feliks Ignacy Kretkowski
- 1731–1733: Tomasz Franciszek Czapski SOC
- 1736–1739: Adam Stanisław Grabowski
- 1739–1746: Andrzej Stanisław Załuski
- 1747–1758: Wojciech Stanisław Leski SOC
- 1759–1785: Andrzej Ignacy Baier
- 1785–1795: Karl von Hohenzollern-Hechingen
- 1795–1814: Franciszek Ksawery Rydzyński

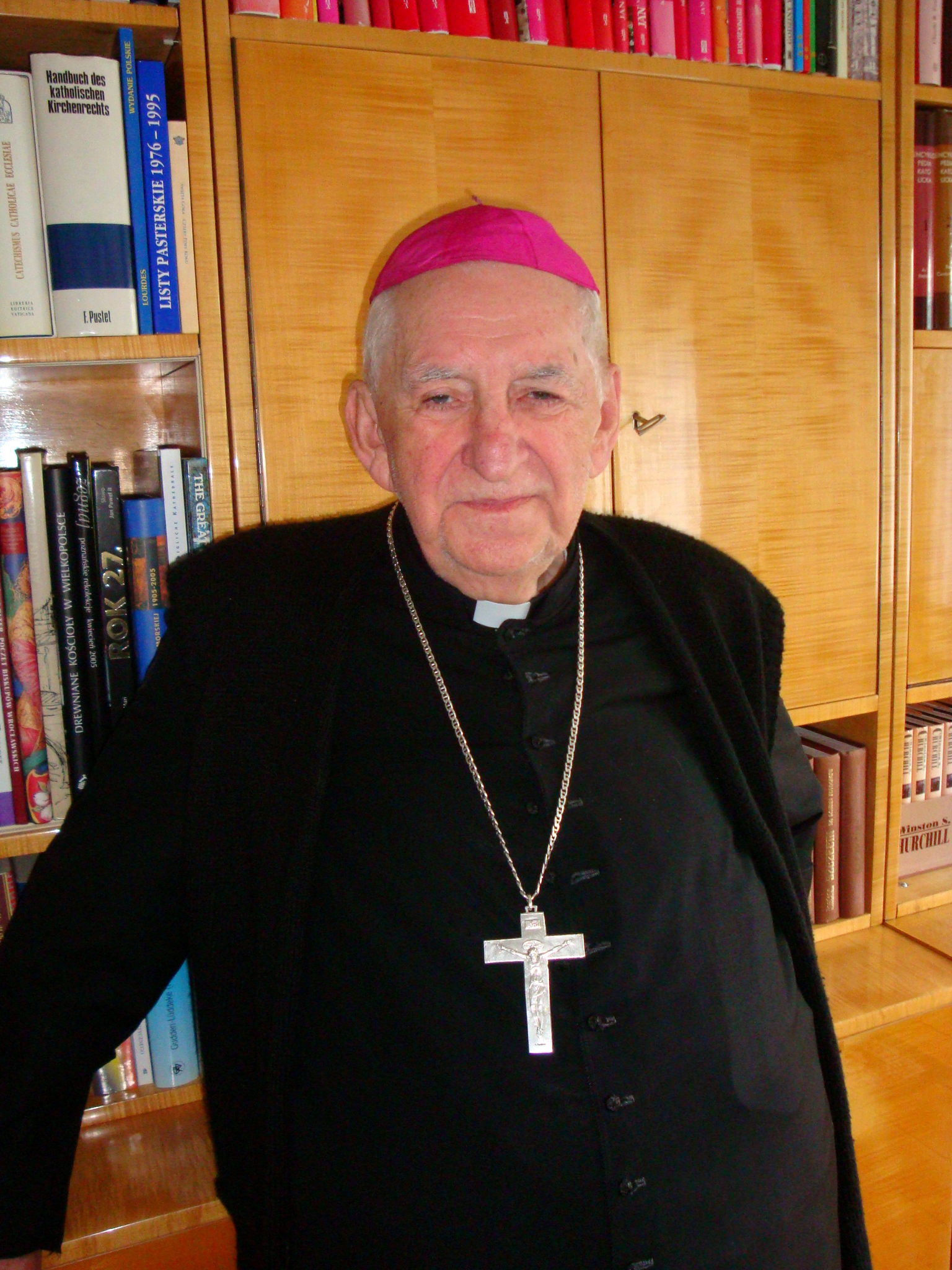
Marian Przykucki, last Bishop of Chełmno

- 1824–1832: Ignacy Stanisław Matthy
- 1834–1856: Anastazy Sedlag
- 1857–1886: Johannes von der Marwitz
- 1886–1898: Leon Redner
- 1899–1926: Augustin Rosentreter
- 1926–1944: Stanisław Wojciech Okoniewski
- 1946–1972: Kazimierz Józef Kowalski
- 1973–1980: Bernard Czapliński
- 1981–1992: Marian Przykucki
