= St. Joseph Church, Międzygórze =

Church in Międzygórze, Poland

The St. Joseph Church in Międzygórze - a wooden Roman Catholic parish church dedicated to St. Joseph, built in the years 1740-42, located in Międzygórze.

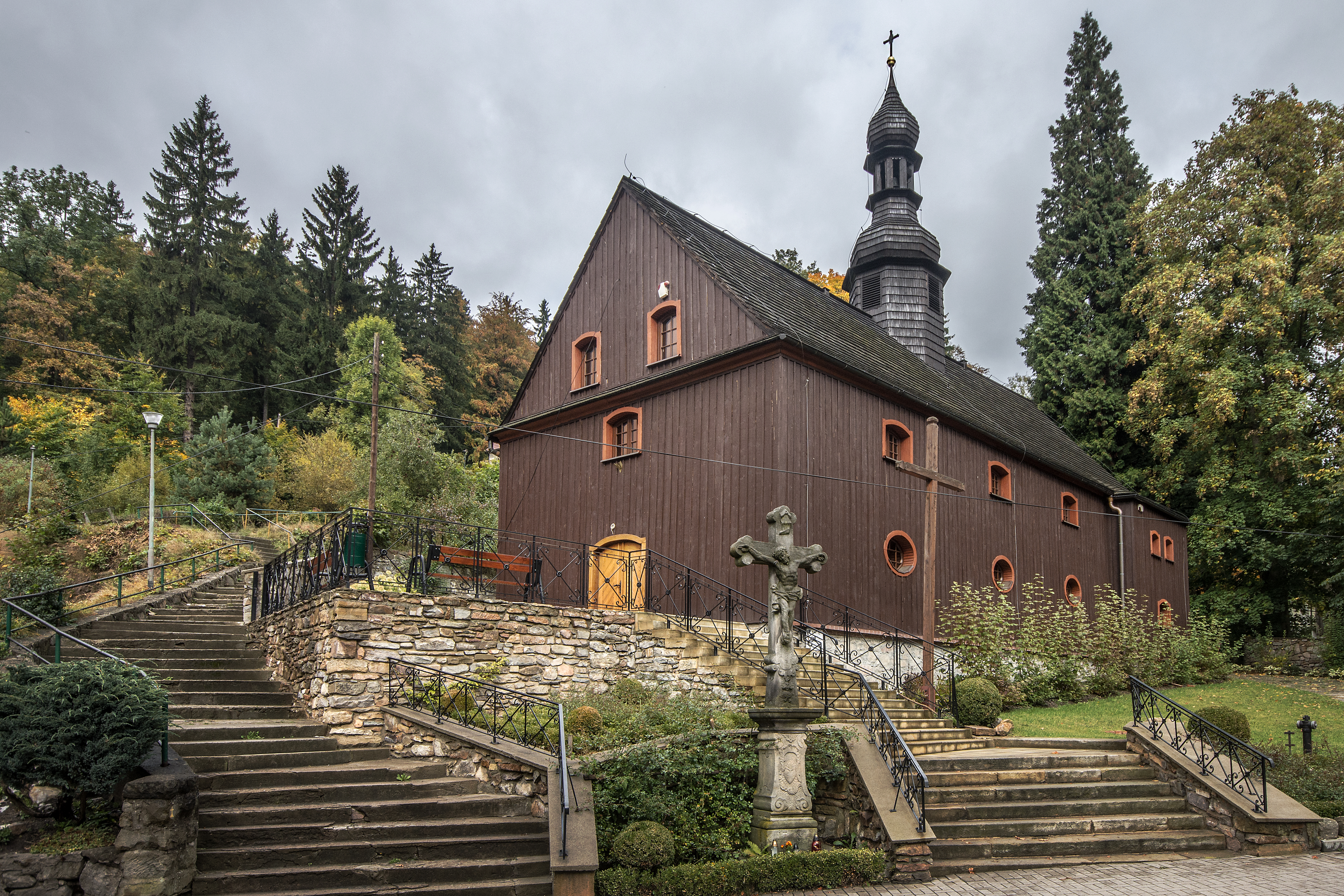
Front elevation

It is one of the four surviving wooden churches in the Kłodzko land. The others are located in Kamieńczyk, Nowa Bystrzyca and Zalesie. Until 2000 it was the only wooden church in the Sudety Mountains with a roof covered with slate.

== History ==
A wooden church in Międzygórze was erected in the center of the village in 1740-1742 as a cemetery church. It was built by local builders Friedrich Knietig from Wilkanów and Heinrich Ludwig from Pławnica, following the example of brick sacral buildings from the Kłodzko land. In the years 1790-1792 the bell tower was renovated and in the second half of the 19th century the ceiling of the presbytery was rebuilt to provide the current decorative interior of the church. In 1924, carpenter Ignatz Herfort probably reconstructed the nave ceiling and built a new roof, which was covered with slate. The slates used, measuring approximately 1 m^{2} in size, came from the only quarry of greywacke slate in the Sudety Mountains located near Jarnołtówek. In 2001 the slate was removed from the roof and replaced with tiles. In 2013 the external facade was repaired.

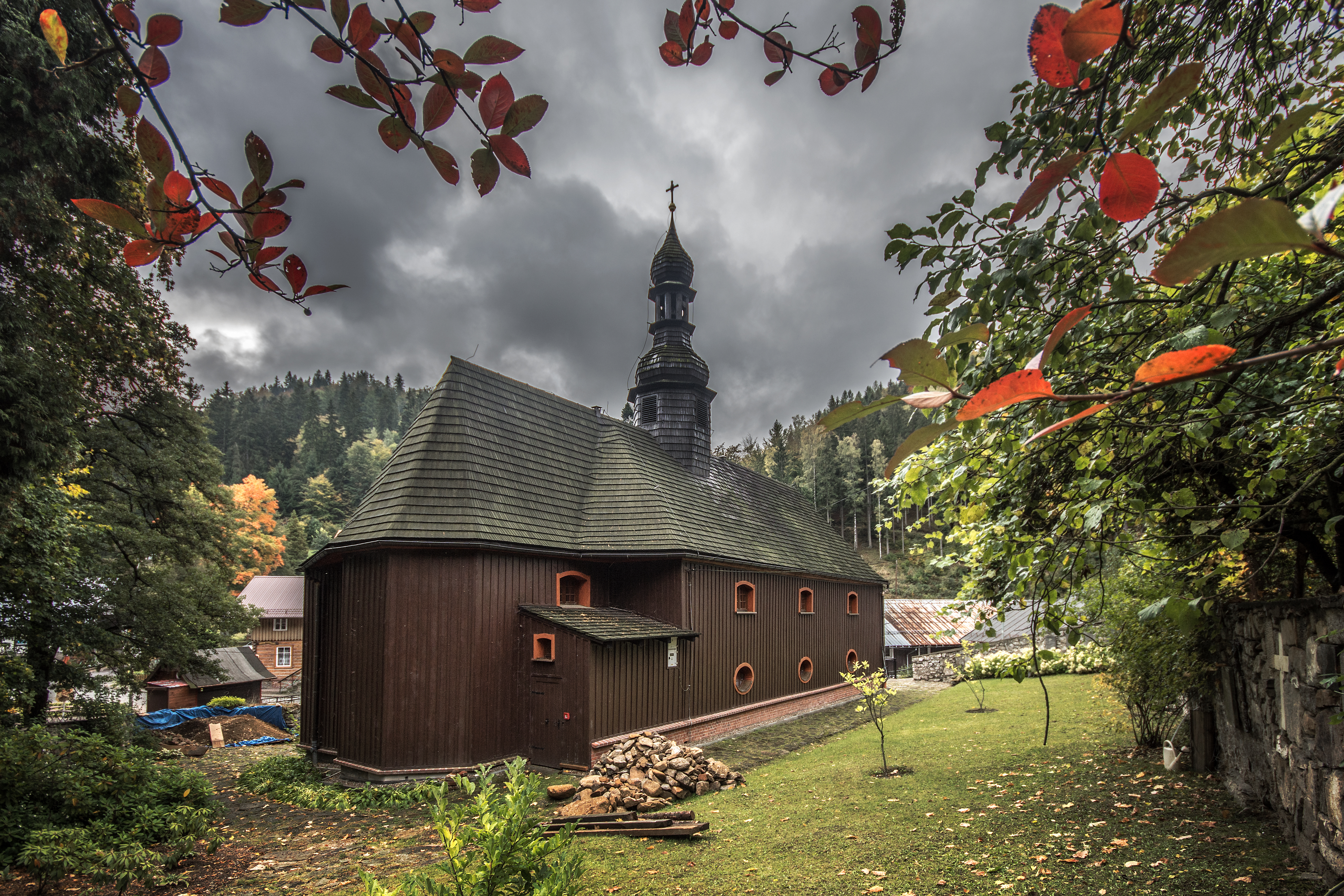
Rear elevation

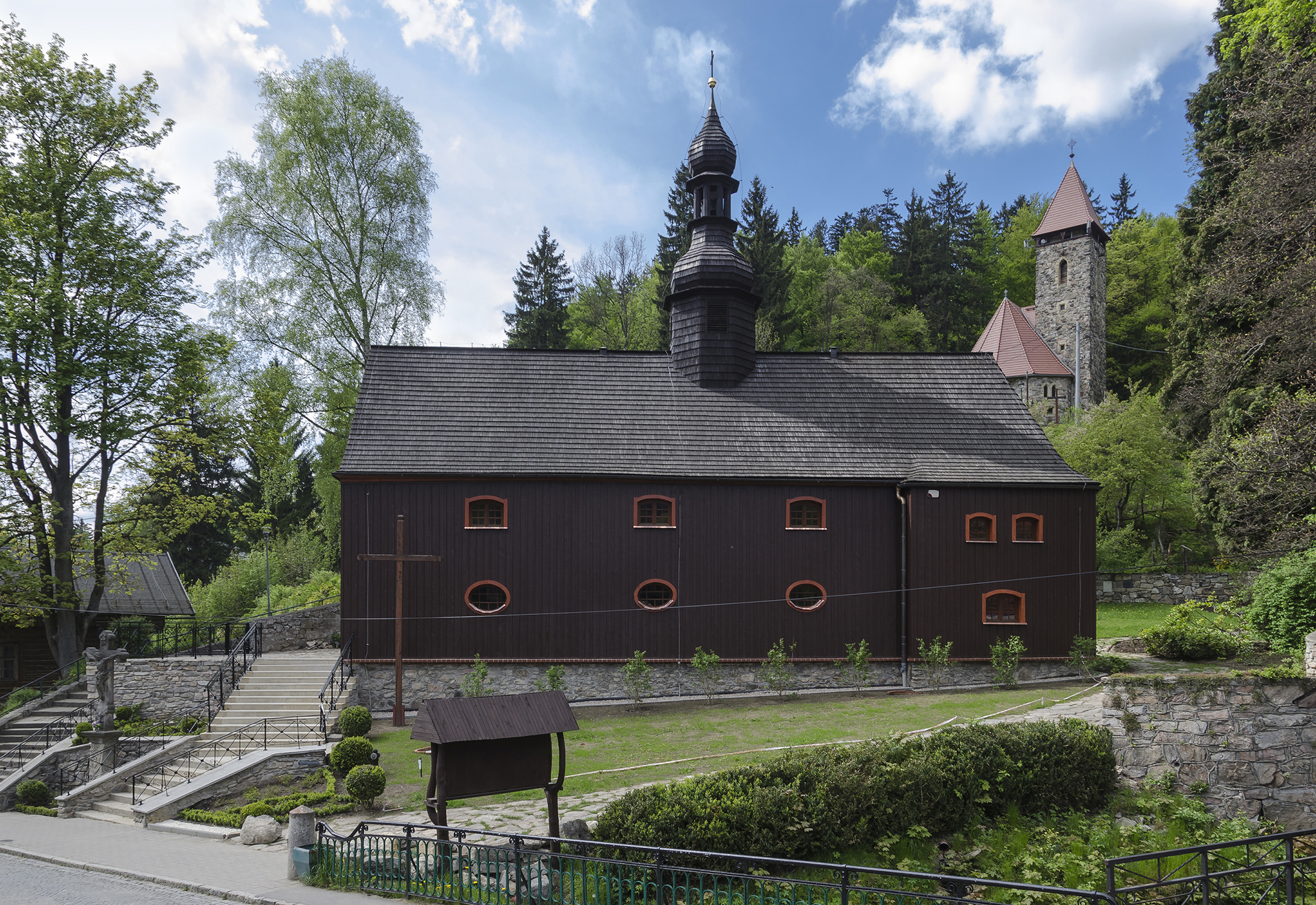
South elevation

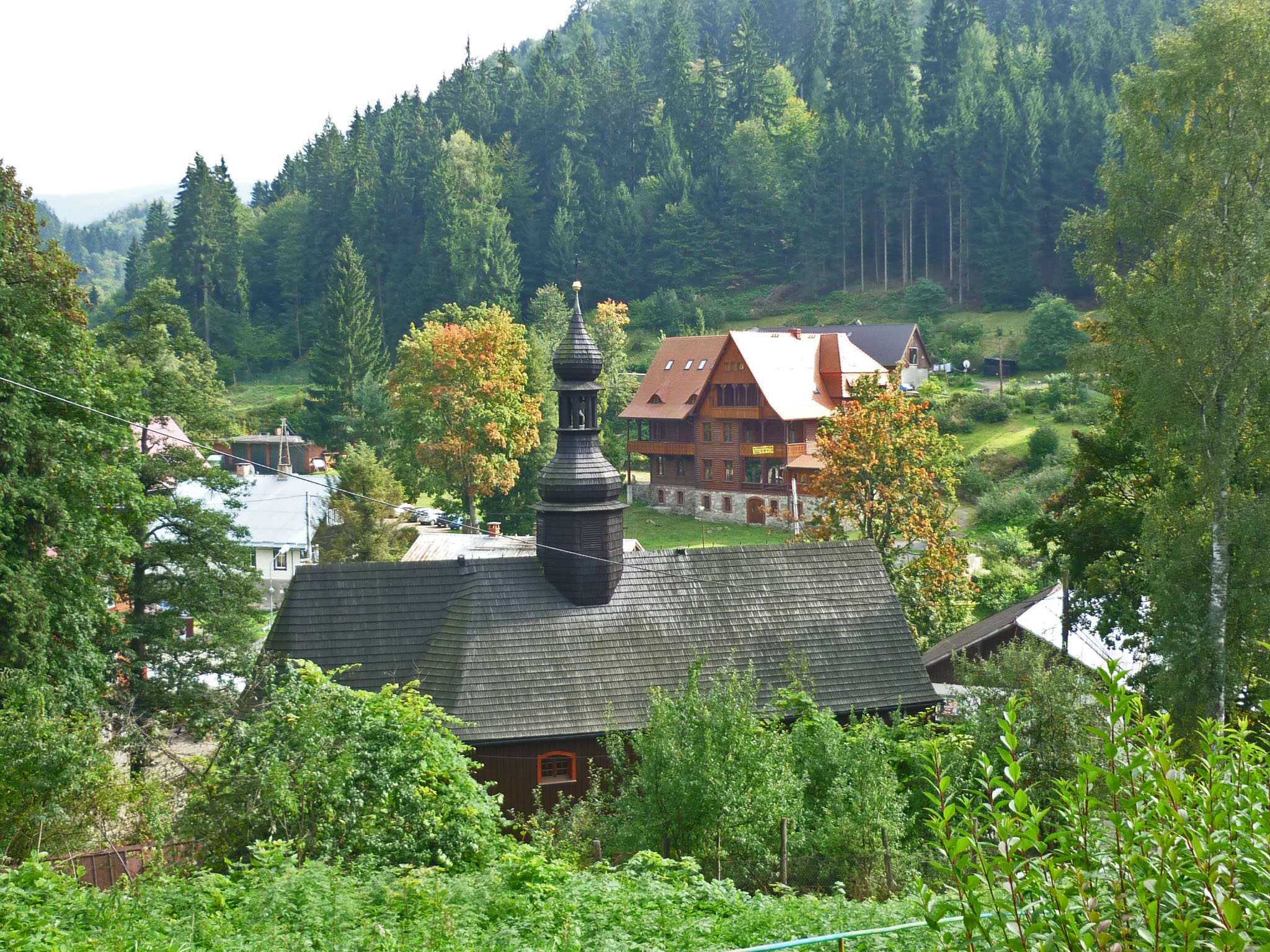
General view

== Architecture and interior ==
A timber-frame building, not oriented. A towerless, one-nave church with a narrower, triangularly closed presbytery and a side sacristy. A narthex at the entrance. The church is covered with a single-pitched shingle roof with an octagonal little bell tower of a timber-frame construction, topped with an onion-shaped cupola with a lantern and a cross.

Inside, over the nave, a beamed ceiling, with chamfered beams at the corners with a decorative herringbone inset arrangement, whitewashed, decorated with a gold geometric trail. The chancel is covered with a coffered ceiling with profiled mouldings, relief rosettes and painted decoration on a blue background. The choir and the side galleries are connected with a balustrade divided into quarters, also filled with reliefs.

The most important equipment: the sculpture of the Holy Family on the beam by Michael Ignacy Klahr; the main altar from the 1740s with the image of St. Joseph and little Jesus in the reredos in the shape of a bouquet of leaves made by Hieronim Richter; the side altar of the Madonna and Child with a Baroque mensa from the second half of the 19th century; a wooden pulpit with paintings of the Evangelists and a Baroque canopy surmounted by tablets with the Ten Commandments from 1908; an organ front and a baptismal font from the second half of the 19th century in Revival style; stations of the Cross founded in the 18th century as votive offerings to pray for the rain that did not fall for three months; numerous sculptures and paintings ranging in date from the 18th century to the beginning of the 20th century.

== Surroundings ==
Gravestones in the wall surrounding the church. A stone Baroque statue of Crucifixion from 1781 stands in front of the church.

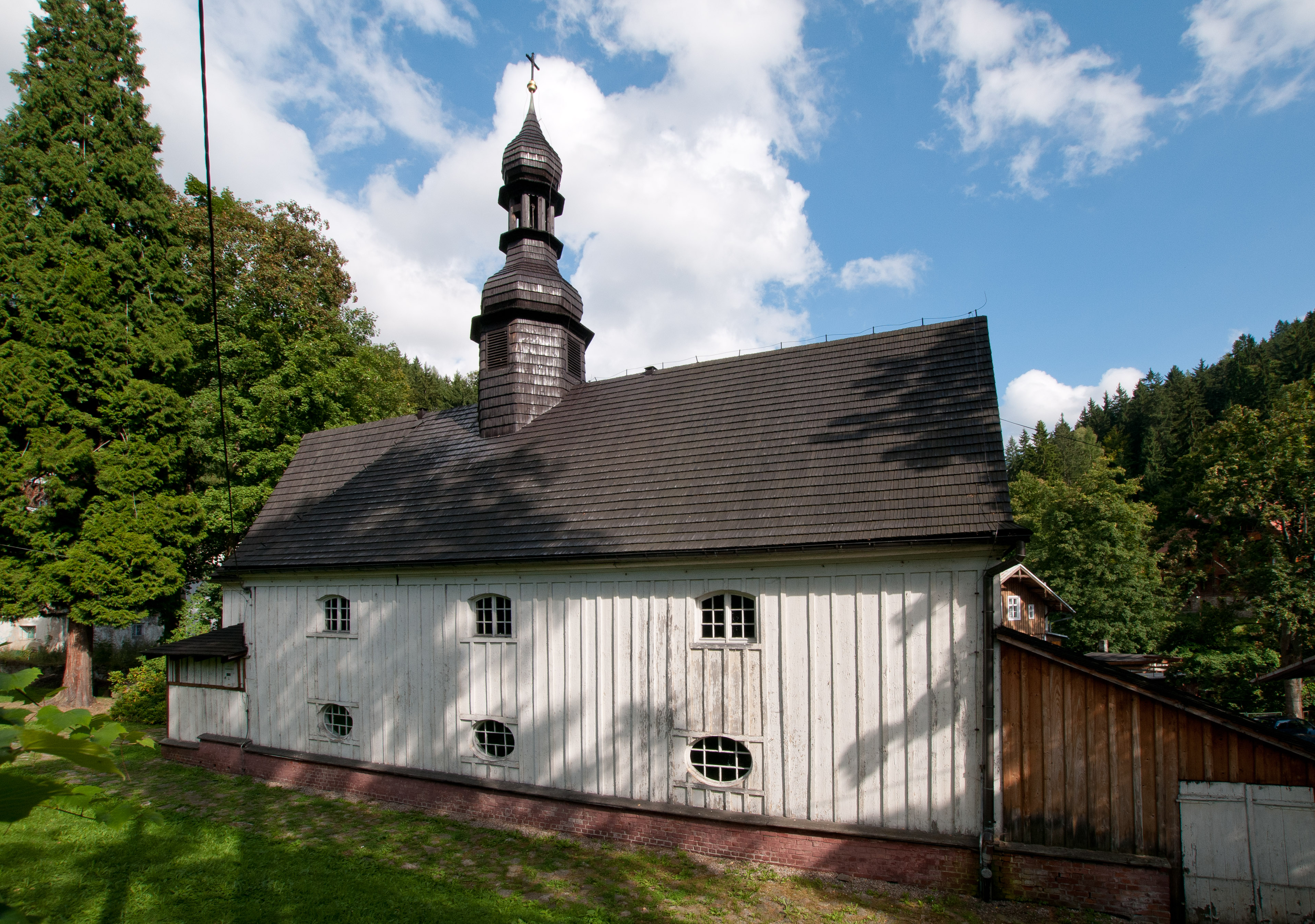
North elevation, before renovation in 2013

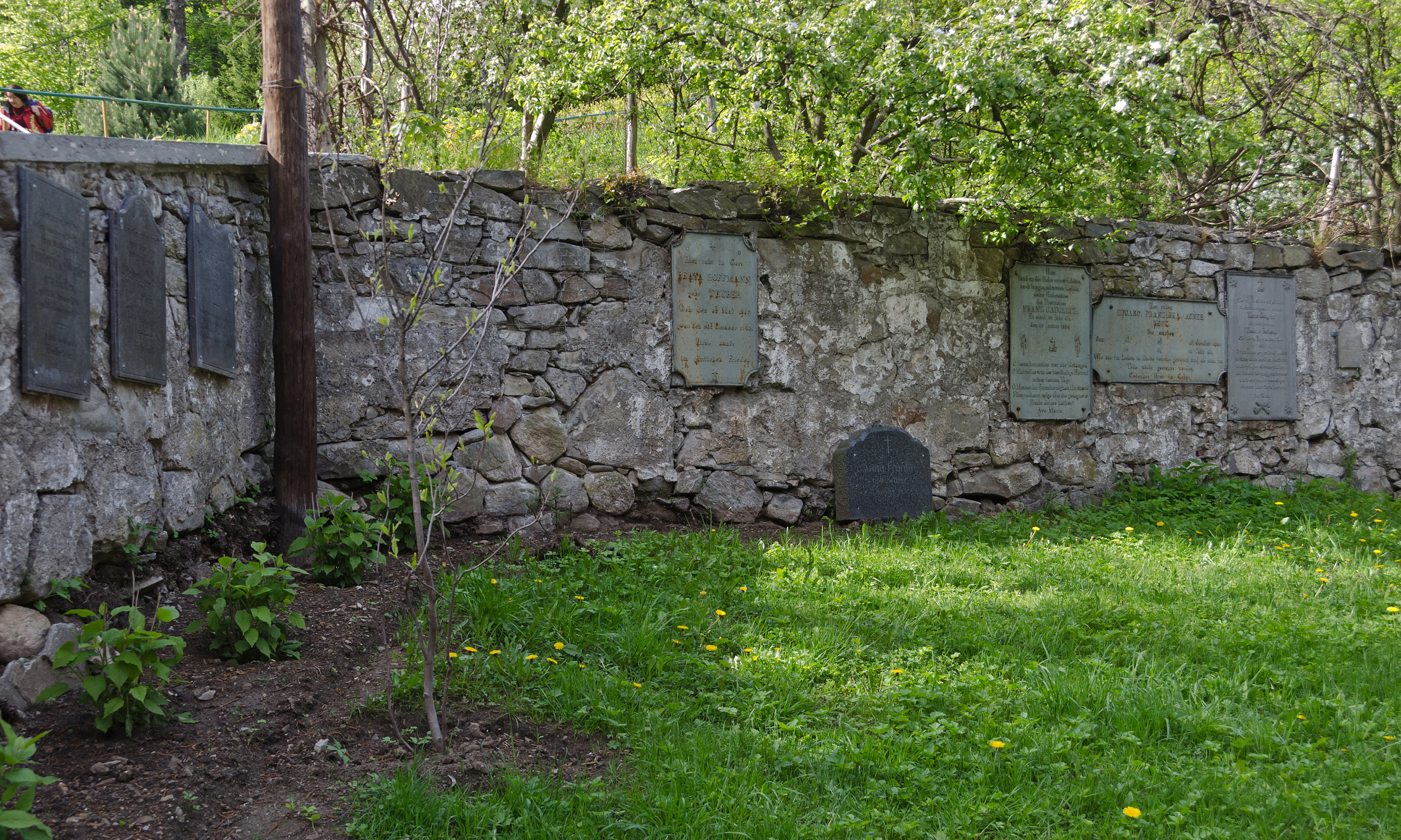
Gravestones in the wall fence

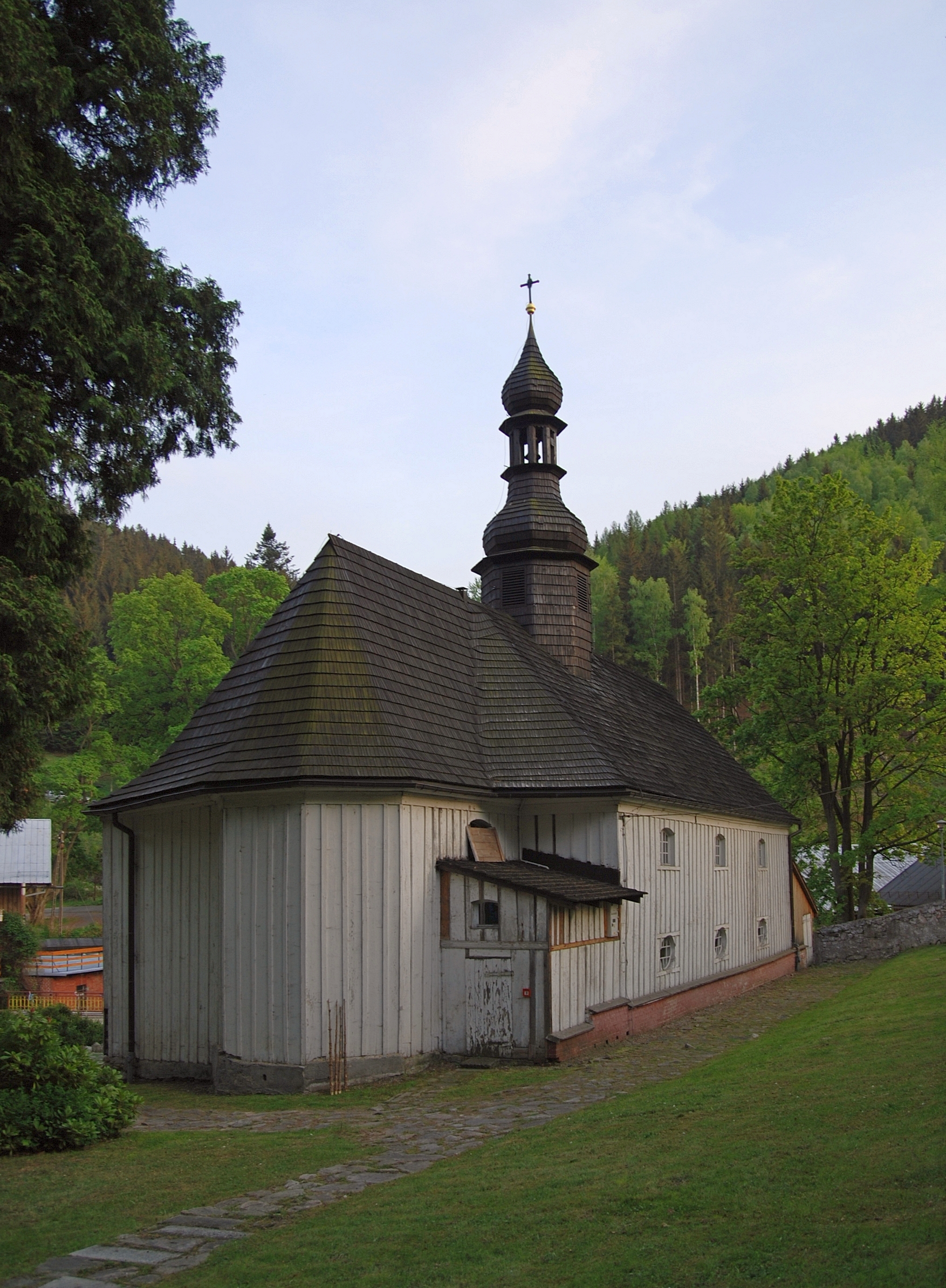
Rear elevation before renovation in 2013
