= Joseph Knauer =

German bishop

His Excellency, The Most Reverend Joseph Knauer
- Bishop of Breslaw
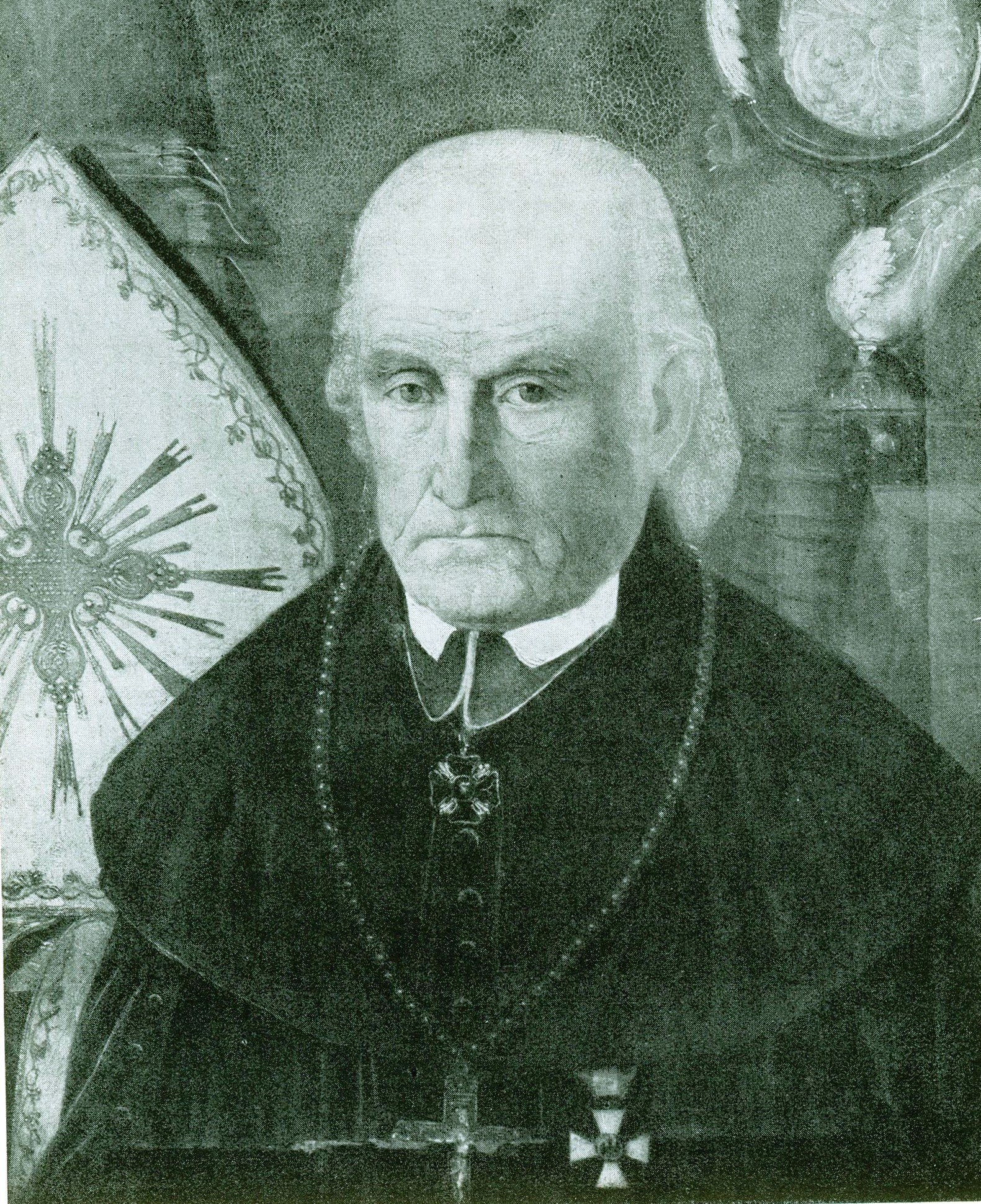
- Church: Catholic Church
- Diocese: Breslaw
- In office: 23 April 1843–16 May 1844

Orders
- Ordination: 7 March 1789
- Consecration: 23 April 1843

Personal details
- Born: 1 December 1764 Czerwony Strumień, Kingdom of Prussia
- Died: 16 May 1844 (aged 79) Breslau, Kingdom of Prussia
- Education: University of Wrocław

Joseph Knauer (1 December 1764 – 16 May 1844) was great dean of Kladsko from 1808 to 1843 and Catholic Bishop of Wrocław from 1843 to 1844.

== Biography ==
=== Childhood and youth ===
He was born in Czerwony Strumień, Kingdom of Prussia, into a poor family of cottagers from Czerwony Strumień on 1 December 1764. His parents were Jan Knauer and Teresa Lux. After graduating from elementary school in Międzylesie he continued his education at a Catholic high school in Wrocław. He earned his living as a chorister and through a private tutor, he began his studies in philosophy and theology at the University of Wrocław.

=== Pastoral work in the county of Kladsko ===
On 7 March 1789 Knauer was ordained priest, after which he was sent to Międzylesie, where he served as a chaplain. In 1794 he was appointed parish priest of the Marian Shrine in Wambierzyce and in 1814 he was appointed parish priest in Bystrzyca Kłodzka.

=== Grand Dean of Kladsko ===
In 1808 while still a priest he was nominated by the King of Prussia Frederick William III of Prussia grand dean of the earldom, a position he filled on 16 January 1809 when Archbishop of Prague, Wilhelm Florentin Fürst von Salm appointed him archbishop's vicar of the County of Kladsko. In 1810, the name for the Dean of Klatsko was renamed to Großdechant. Since this was merely a title of honor to which no authority was given, Knauer doubted its purpose. During his bishopric, Pope Pius VII, issued the bull De salute animarum on 16 July 1821 which confirmed the membership of the Kłodzko to the archbishopric of Prague, but also introduced a stronger link between the Deanery of the Diocese of Wrocław. and each dean was to become an honorary canon of Wrocław. Knauer was then chosen as priest from Kladsko land.

In 1837 the faculty of theology of the University of Wrocław awarded him with an honorary doctorate. On 27 August 1841 Knauer became a member of the Wrocław Cathedral's chapter.

=== Roman Catholic Bishop of Breslau and death ===
On 6 February 1843 Pope Gregory XVI appointed him bishop of Wrocław. His enthronement took place on 23 April 1843 and his episcopal ordination was performed by Auxiliary Bishop Daniel Latussek.

Knauer was already very old. During his brief reign he was in conflict with a German national church founded by Fr. Johannes Ronge. He died on 16 May 1844 in Wrocław and was buried in the basement of Cathedral of St. John the Baptist in Wrocław.
