= Eastern Neisse =

Eastern Neisse (Nysa Kłodzka)
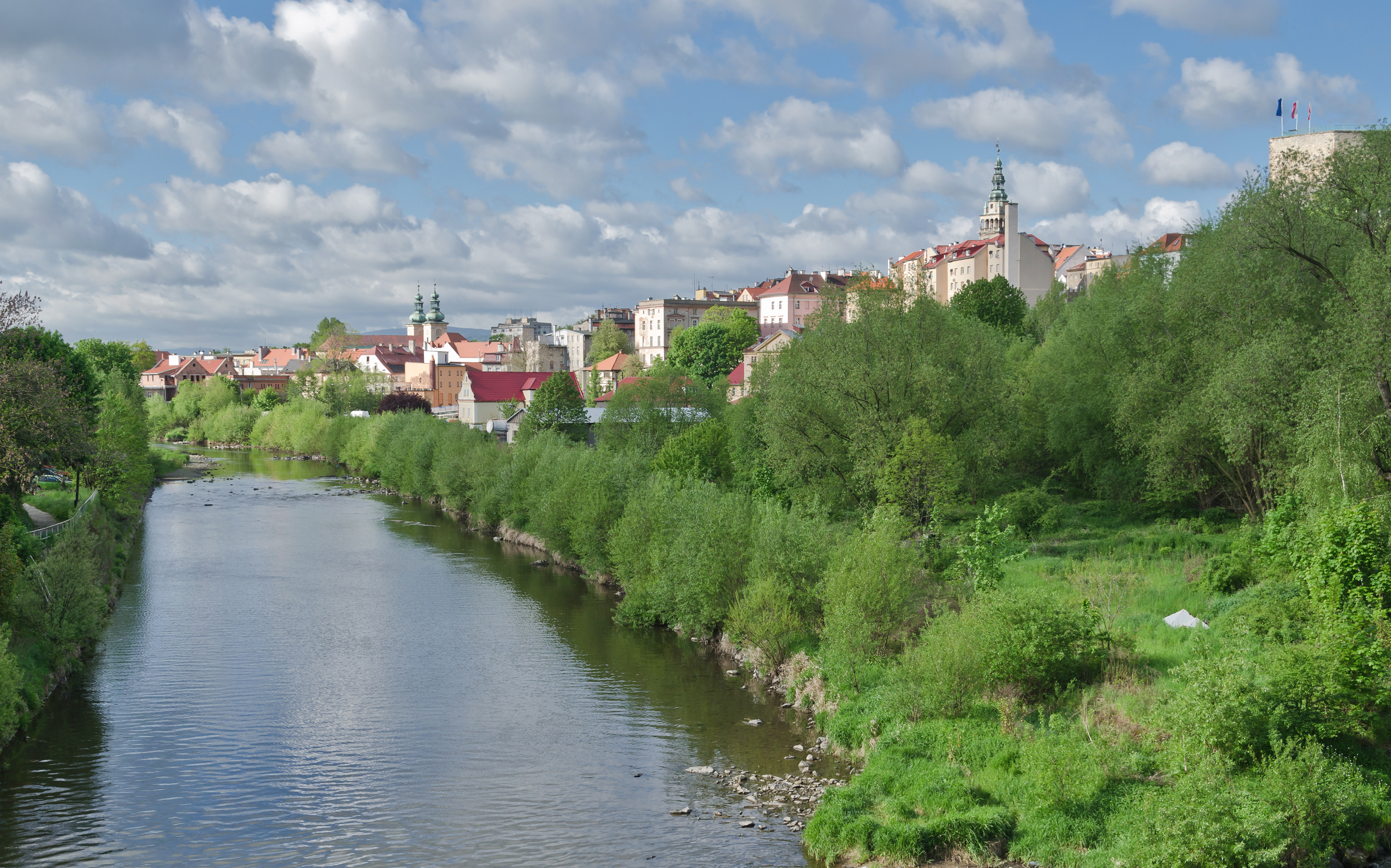
- Eastern Neisse in Kłodzko

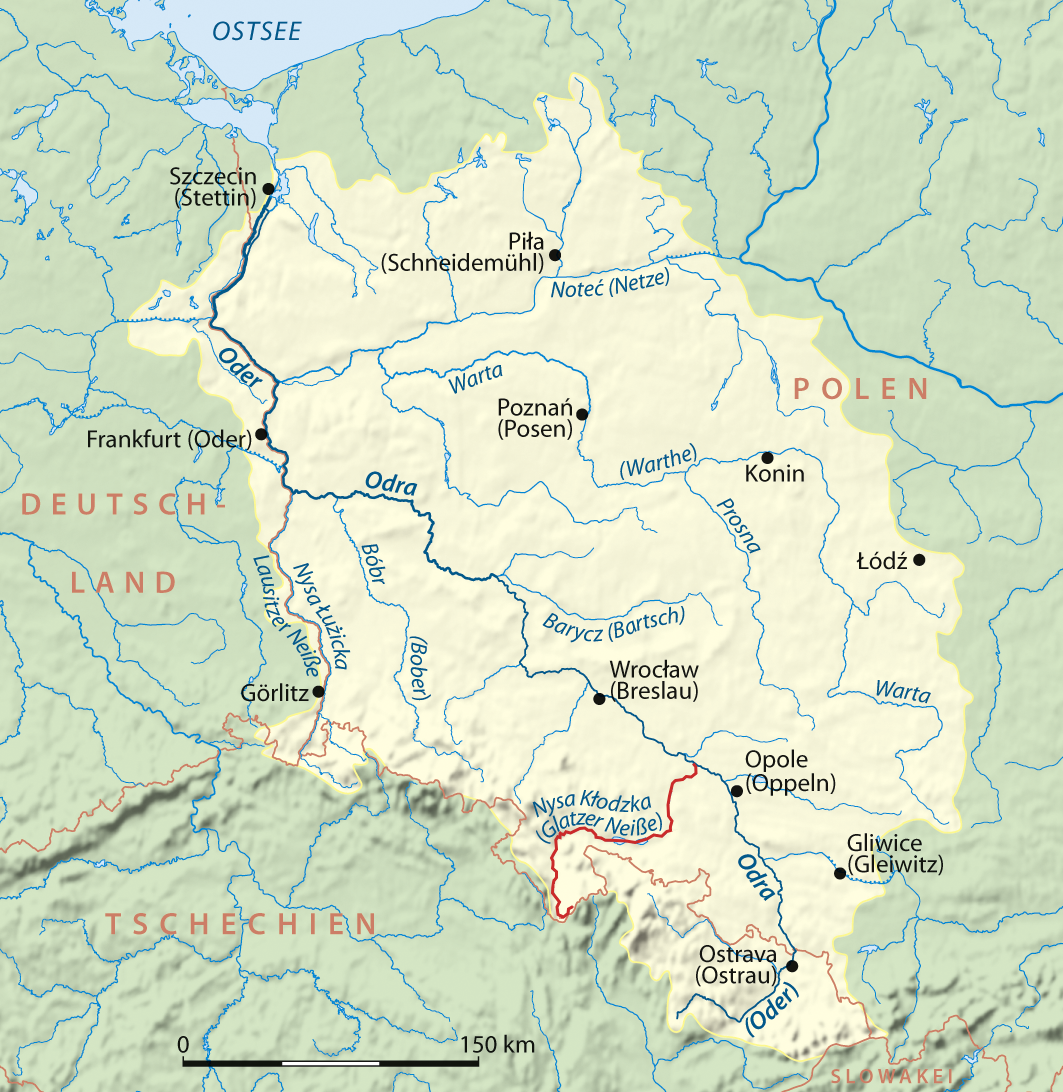
- Oder basin, Eastern Neisse in red

Location
- Country: Poland
- Region: Lower Silesian Voivodeship, Opole Voivodeship

Physical characteristics
- Source
  - location: Jodłów, Lower Silesian Voivodeship, Poland
  - coordinates: 50°9′53″N 16°47′20″E
  - elevation: 1006 m
- Mouth: Oder
  - location: Rybna, Opole Voivodeship, Poland
  - coordinates: 50°49′9″N 17°39′30″E
  - elevation: 139 m
- Length: 189 km (117 mi)
- Basin size: 4,570 km^{2} (1,760 sq mi)
- Discharge
  - location: mouth
  - average: 37.7 m^{3}/s (1,330 cu ft/s)

Basin features
- Progression: Oder→ Baltic Sea

The Eastern Neisse, also known by its Polish name of Nysa Kłodzka (German: Glatzer Neiße, Czech: Kladská Nisa), is a river in southwestern Poland, a left tributary of the Oder, with a length of 188 km (21st longest) and a basin area of 4,570 km^{2} (3,742 in Poland).

Prior to World War II it was part of Germany. During the Yalta Conference it was discussed by the Western Allies as one possible line of the western Polish border. Attempts were made to negotiate a compromise with the Soviets on the new Polish-German frontier; it was suggested that the Eastern Neisse be made the line of demarcation. This would have meant that (East) Germany could have retained approximately half of Silesia, including most of Wrocław (formerly Breslau). However the Soviets rejected the suggestion at the Potsdam Conference and insisted that the southern boundary between Germany and Poland be drawn further west, at the Lusatian Neisse.

== Floods ==
The Eastern Neisse originates in the Králický Sněžník Mountains of the Sudetes, near the border with the Czech Republic. It is partially regulated. The river has often burst its banks and flooded nearby towns, at times destroying them completely. Town chronicles from Kłodzko mention floods in the following years:

- 14th century: 1310
- 15th century: 1441, 1464, 1474
- 16th century: 1500, 1522, 1524, 1560, 1566, 1570, 1587, 1589, 1591, 1598,
- 17th century: 1602, 1603, 1605, 1610, 1611, 1612, 1625, 1646, 1652, 1655, 1689, 1693, 1696
- 18th century: 1702, 1703, 1713, 1724, 1735, 1736, 1740, 1755, 1763, 1767, 1775, 1785, 1787, 1789, 1799
- 19th century: 1804, 1806, 1827, 1828, 1829, 1831, 1850, 1854, 1879, 1881, 1883, 1891, 1897
- 20th century: 1900, 1903, 1907, 1938, 1952, 1997, 1998
- 21st century: 2024

== Towns ==
Until 1945, these communities were situated on German territory and largely populated by Germans before they fled or were expelled at the end of the Second World War. German names are indicated in italics.

- Bardo (Wartha)
- Bystrzyca Kłodzka (Habelschwerdt)
- Kamieniec Ząbkowicki (Kamenz N.S.)
- Kłodzko (Glatz)
- Lewin Brzeski (Löwen)
- Międzylesie (Mittelwalde) - both names mean "middle of the woods"
- Nysa (Neiße)
- Otmuchów (Ottmachau)
- Paczków (Patschkau)

== See also ==
- Lusatian Neisse (Lužická Nisa, Nysa Łużycka)
- Raging Neisse (Nysa Szalona)
- Nysa Mała (Little Neisse)
- Rivers of Poland
- Geography of Poland
