= Diepenbrock =

Diepenbrock is a surname. Notable people with the surname include:

- Alphons Diepenbrock (1862–1921), Dutch composer, essayist, and classicist
- Melchior von Diepenbrock (1798–1853), German Catholic Prince-Bishop of Breslau and Cardinal
