= Gniewoszów =

Gniewoszów may refer to the following places in Poland:

- Gniewoszów, Lower Silesian Voivodeship (south-west Poland)
- Gniewoszów, Masovian Voivodeship (east-central Poland)
