= Potoczek, Kłodzko County =

Potoczek
- Village
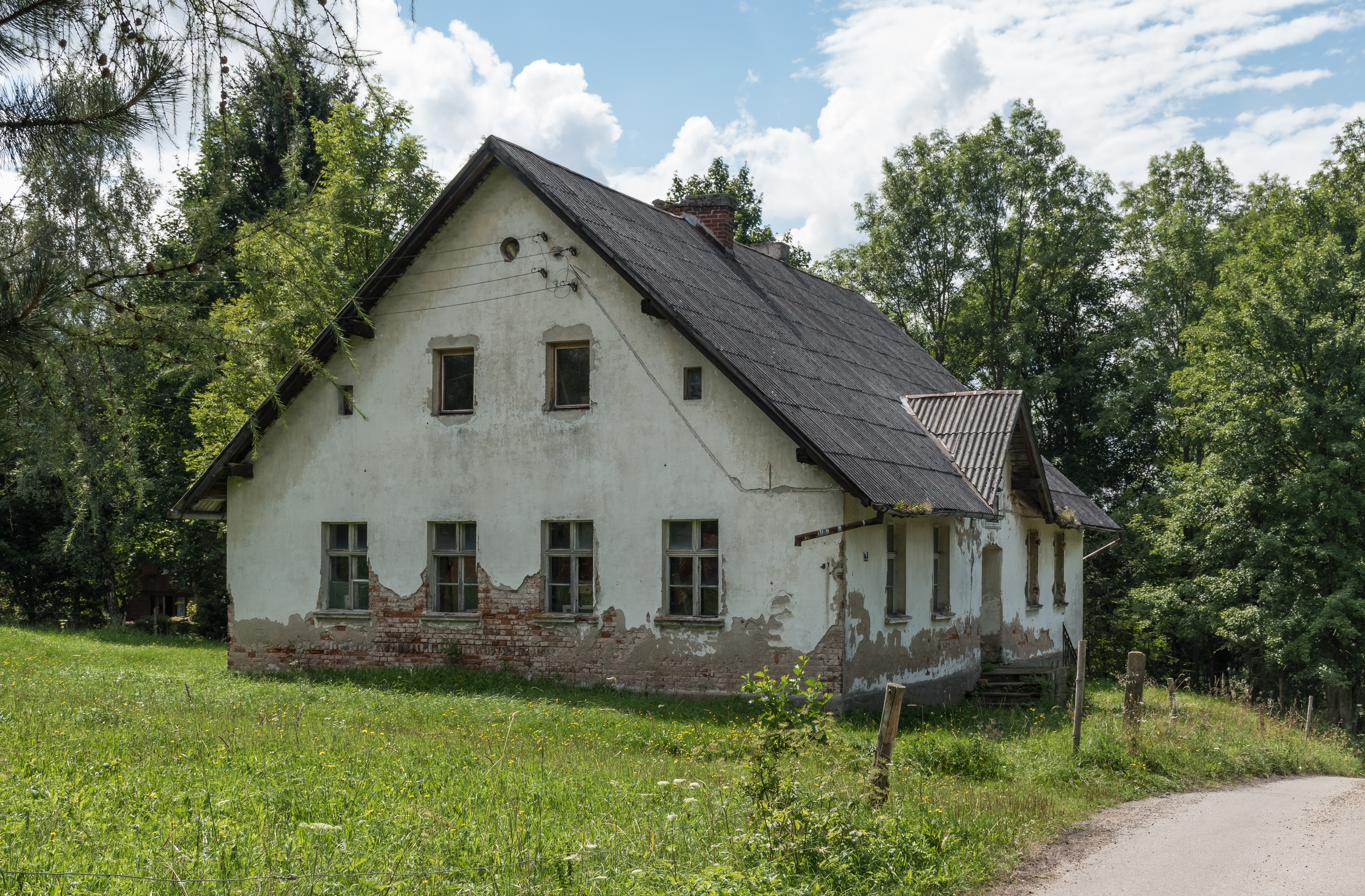

- Location within Poland
- Coordinates: 50°8′40″N 16°45′25″E
- Country: Poland
- Voivodeship: Lower Silesian
- County: Kłodzko
- Gmina: Międzylesie

Potoczek [pɔˈtɔt͡ʂɛk] is a village in the administrative district of Gmina Międzylesie, within Kłodzko County, Lower Silesian Voivodeship, in south-western Poland, near the border with the Czech Republic.
