= Lesica, Lower Silesian Voivodeship =

Lesica
- Village
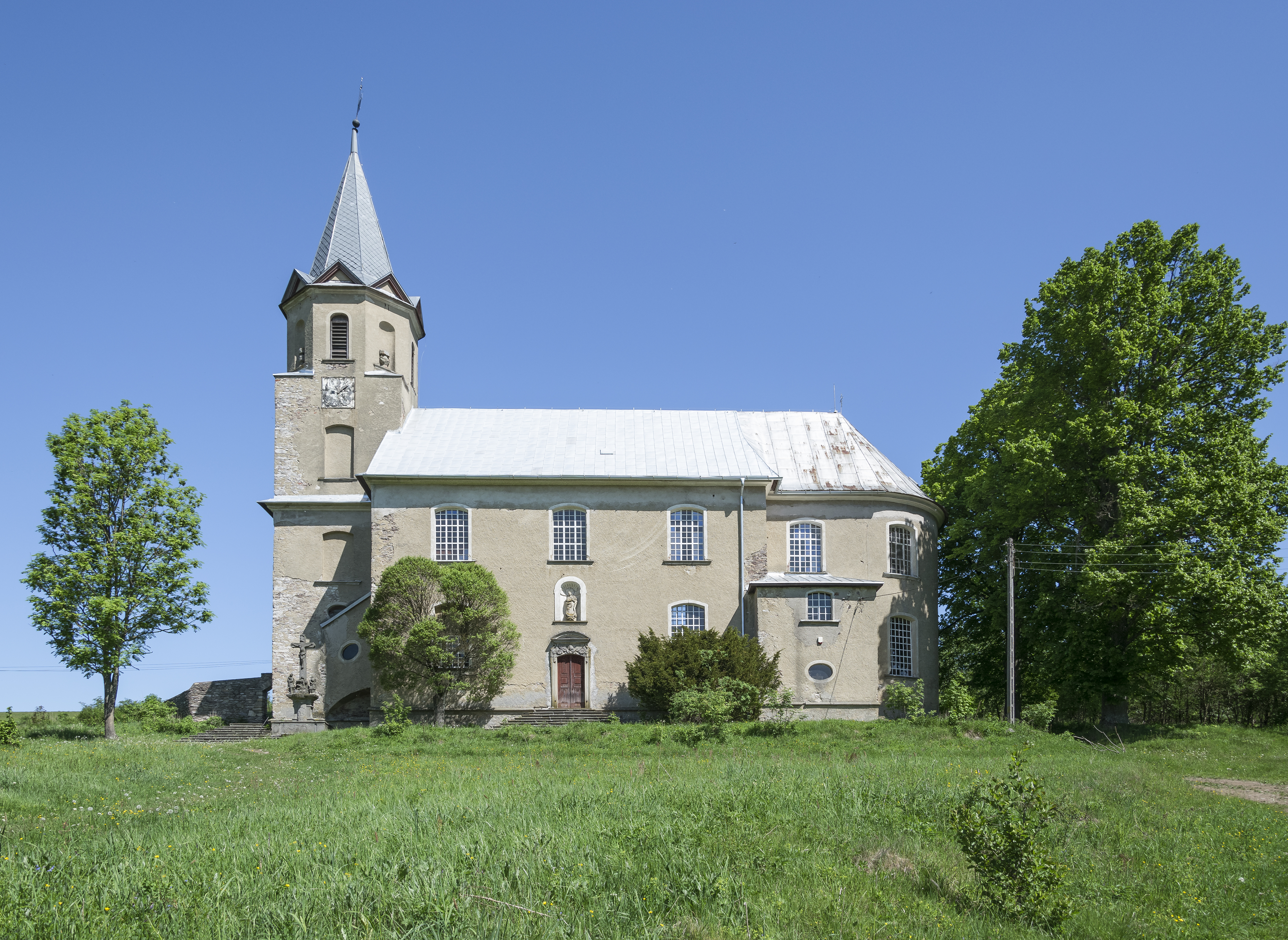
- Church of St. Martin in Lesica

- Location within Poland
- Coordinates: 50°08′57″N 16°36′01″E
- Country: Poland
- Voivodeship: Lower Silesian
- County: Kłodzko
- Gmina: Międzylesie

Lesica [lɛˈɕit͡sa] is a village in the administrative district of Gmina Międzylesie, within Kłodzko County, Lower Silesian Voivodeship, in south-western Poland, near the border with the Czech Republic.
