= Gajnik =

- Village
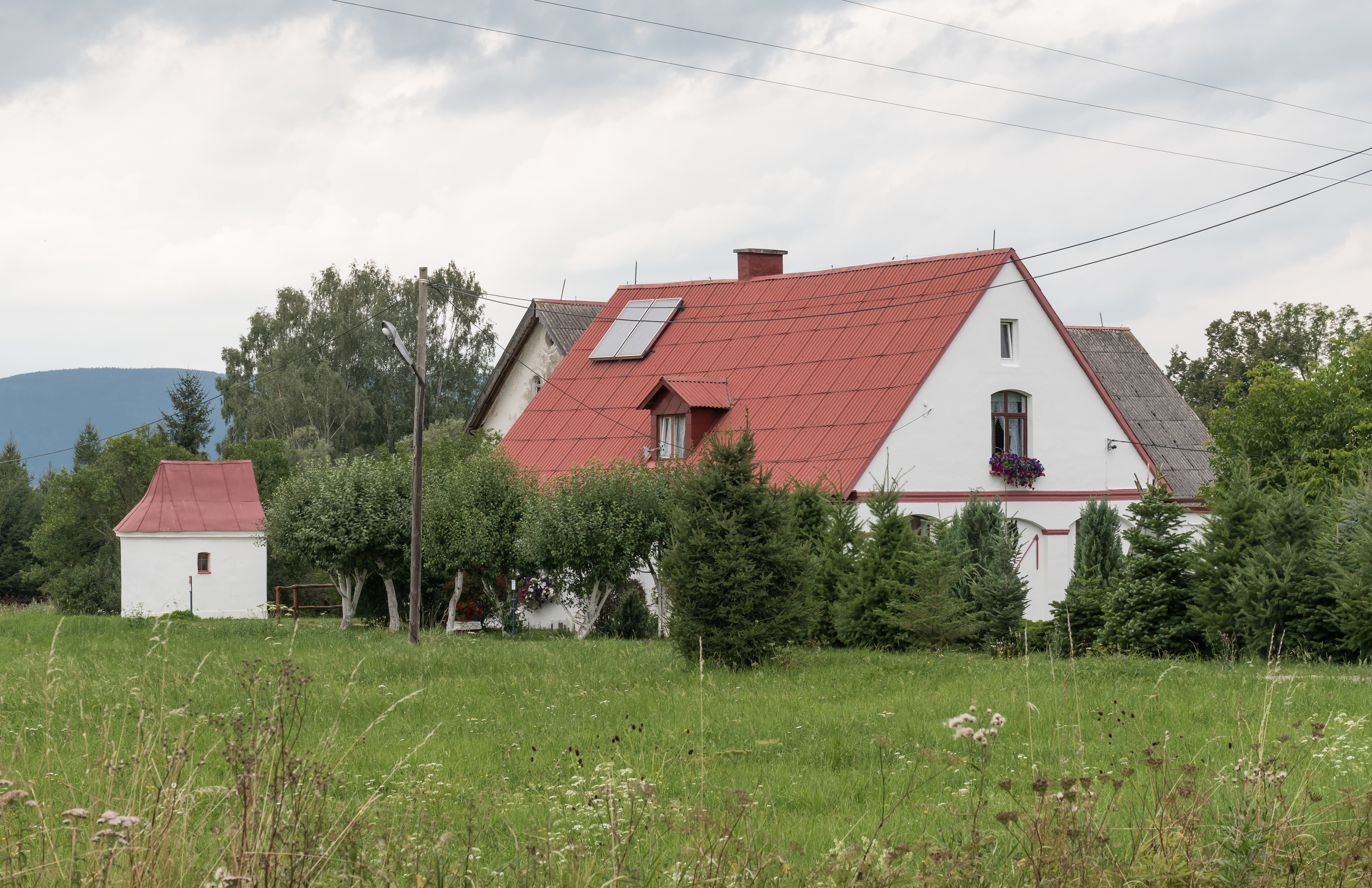

- Location within Poland
- Coordinates: 50°11′36″N 16°42′33″E
- Country: Poland
- Voivodeship: Lower Silesian
- County: Kłodzko
- Gmina: Międzylesie
- Population: 130

Gajnik [ˈɡai̯nik] is a village in the administrative district of Gmina Międzylesie, within Kłodzko County, Lower Silesian Voivodeship, in south-western Poland.
