= Smreczyna =

- Village
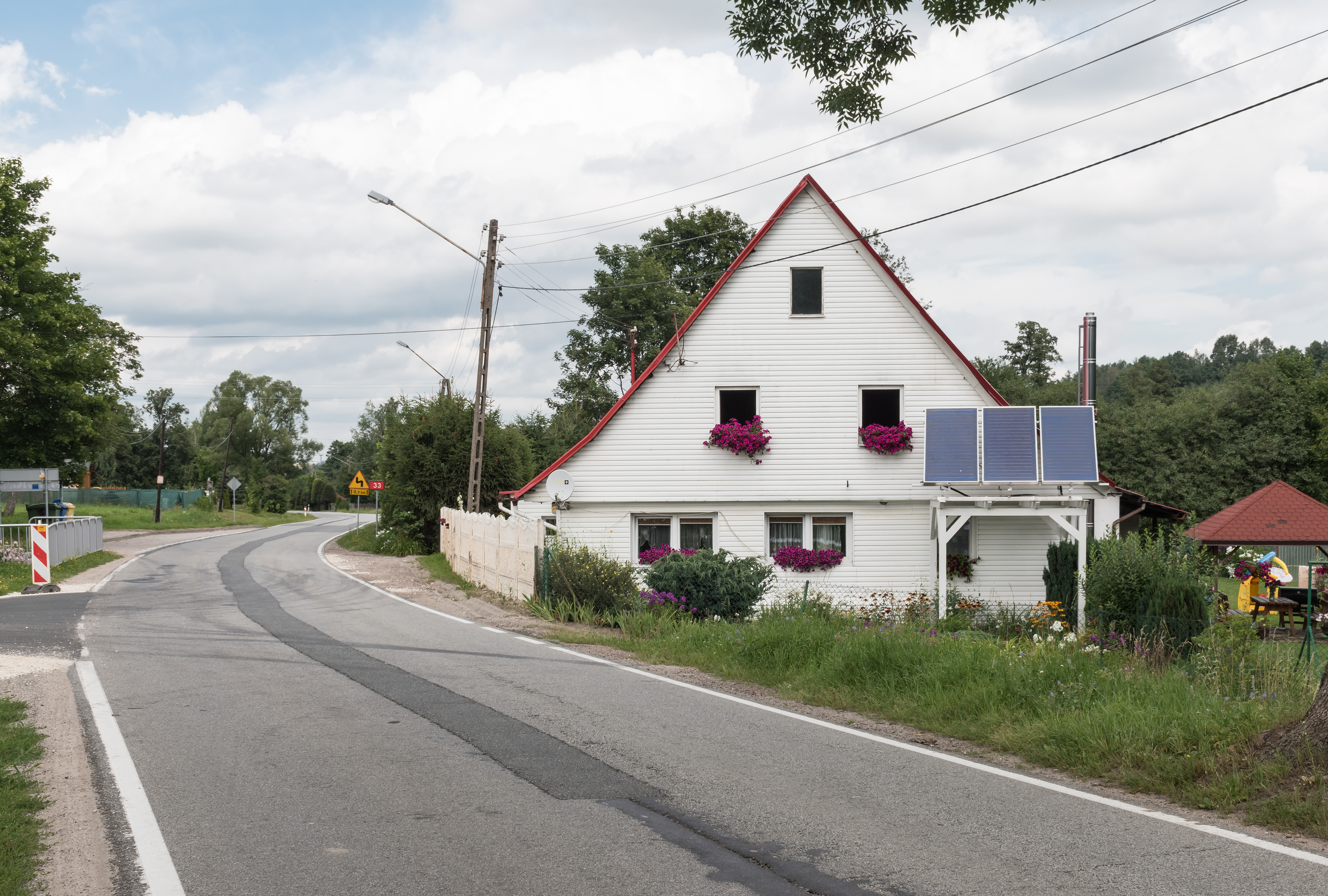

- Location within Poland
- Coordinates: 50°7′N 16°40′E
- Country: Poland
- Voivodeship: Lower Silesian
- County: Kłodzko
- Gmina: Międzylesie

Smreczyna [smrɛˈt͡ʂɨna] is a village in the administrative district of Gmina Międzylesie, within Kłodzko County, Lower Silesian Voivodeship, in south-western Poland.
