= Melchior von Diepenbrock =

German Catholic Prince-Bishop of Breslau and Cardinal

His Eminence, Freiherr Melchior von Diepenbrock
- Prince-Bishop of Breslau
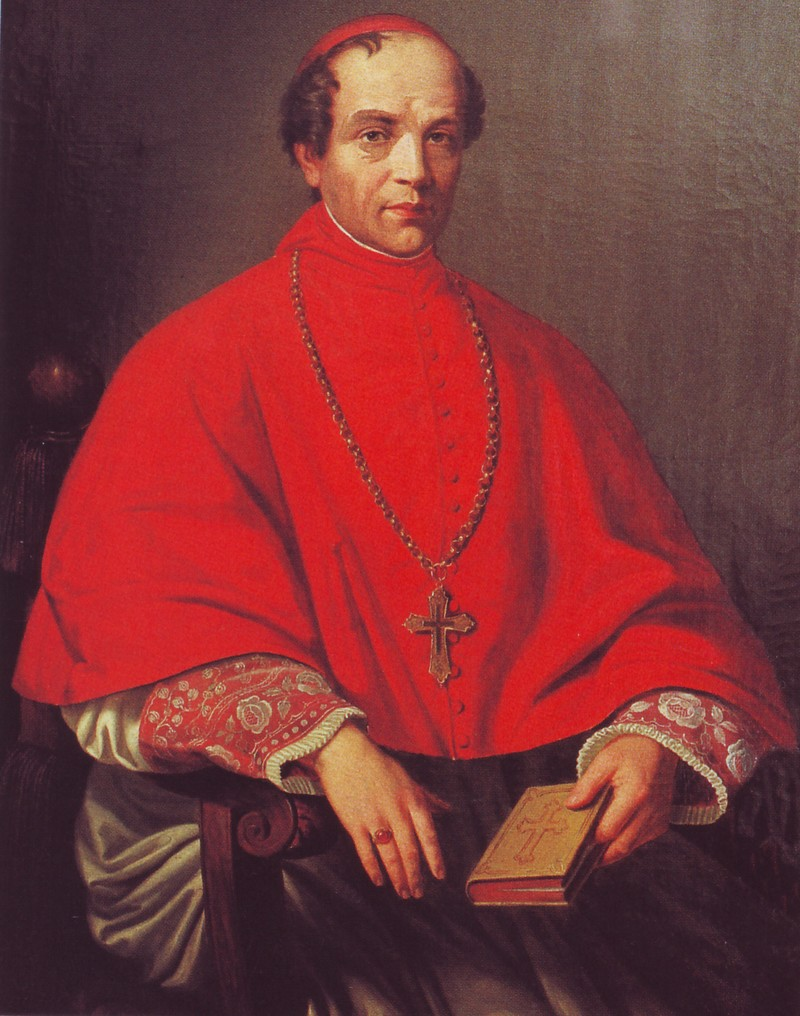
- Diocese: Breslau
- See: Breslau
- Elected: 15 January 1845
- Installed: 8 June 1845
- Term ended: 20 January 1853
- Predecessor: Joseph Knauer
- Successor: Heinrich Ernst Karl Förster

Orders
- Ordination: 27 December 1823
- Consecration: 8 June 1845 by Friedrich Johann Joseph Cölestin zu Cardinal von Schwarzenberg
- Created cardinal: 30 September 1850 by Pope Pius IX

Personal details
- Born: 6 January 1798 Bocholt in Westphalia
- Died: 20 January 1853 (aged 55) Castle of Johannesberg
- Denomination: Roman Catholic
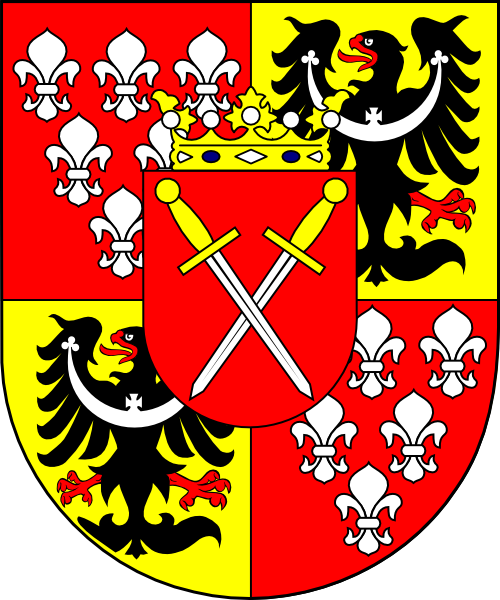
- Coat of arms

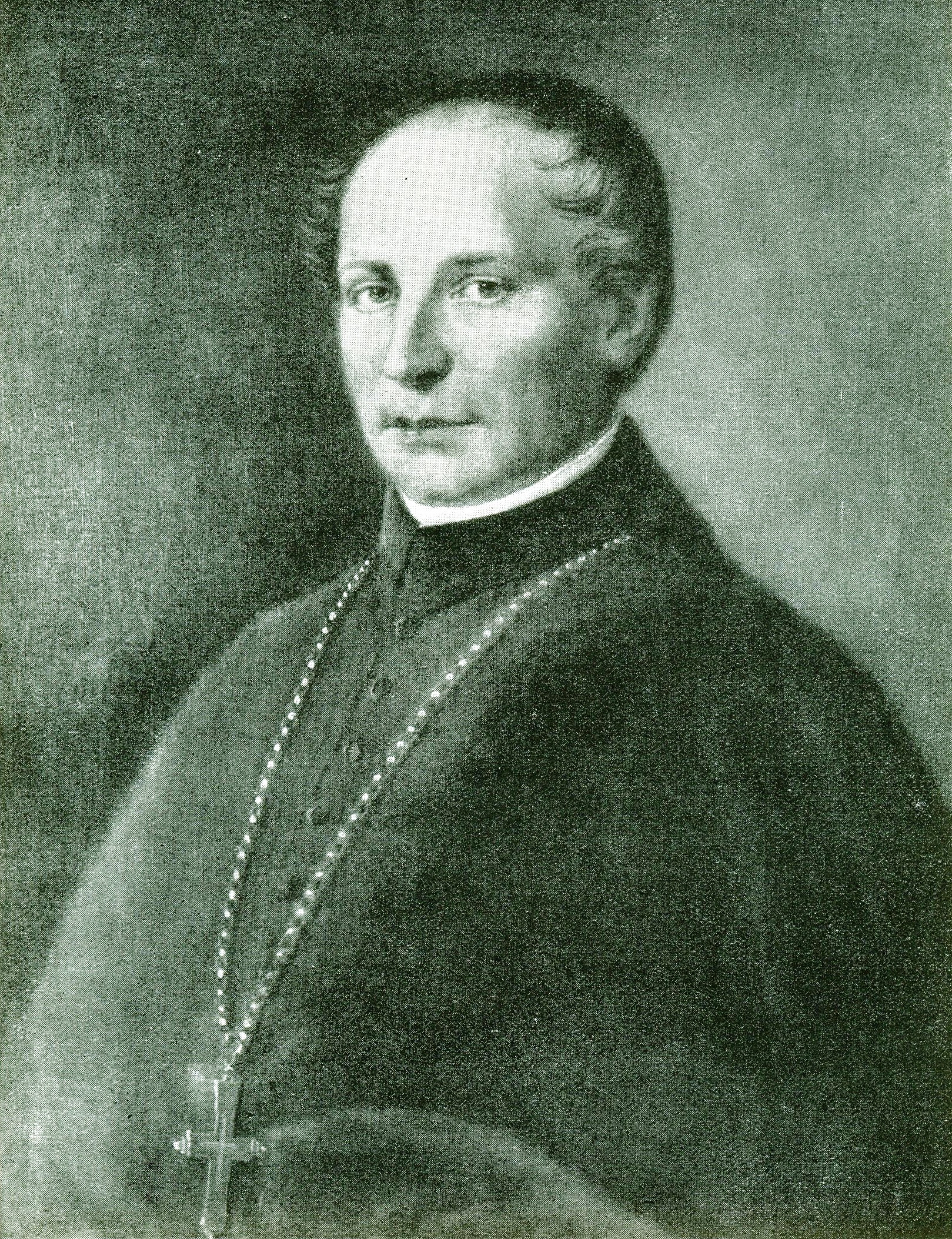
Melchior von Diepenbrock.

Melchior, Freiherr von Diepenbrock (6 January 1798 at Bocholt in Westphalia – 20 January 1853 at the castle of Johannesberg in Jauernig) was a German Catholic Prince-Bishop of Breslau and Cardinal.

== Life ==
Diepenbrock attended the military academy at Bonn and took part in the campaign against France in 1815 as an officer of the militia. Upon his return, he was much attracted by the personality of Johann Michael Sailer, a friend of the family, at that time professor at the University of Landshut in Bavaria, and studied public finance at that institution. When Sailer was made Bishop of Ratisbon, Diepenbrock followed him there, took up the study of theology, and was ordained priest on 27 December 1823.

In 1835, Diepenbrock was made dean of the cathedral and vicar-general by the successor of Bishop Sailer. His knowledge of modern languages and his administrative ability, together with his understanding of the interior life and his ascetical character, paved the way for his elevation to the episcopal See of Breslau, to which he was elected on 15 January 1845. He at first declined the honor, but finally accepted out of obedience to the mandate of Pope Gregory XVI.

From the beginning of his reign, Diepenbrock was called to face difficult problems and momentous political events. There was famine in Upper Silesia. The Revolution of 1848 showed him to be one of the most loyal supporters of government, law, and order. The pastoral letter which he issued on this occasion was, by order of the king, read in all the Protestant churches of the realm. He devoted his energies to the training of the clergy, opened a preparatory seminary, and improved the conditions of the higher seminary. He was a watchful guardian of ecclesiastical discipline and, when necessary, employed severe measures to enforce it. He reintroduced retreats for the priests and missions for the people.

In 1849, Diepenbrock was appointed Apostolic delegate for the Prussian army. He was created cardinal in the consistory of 20 September 1850, and received the purple on 4 November. This event gave occasion to one of the most magnificent public demonstrations ever witnessed in Germany. It was soon followed by the cardinal's death from disease.

Diepenbrock's will bequeathed his estate to his diocese. In personal appearance, he was of dignified presence, but pleasant and affable to all.

== Works ==
Diepenbrock was a noted preacher and poet. His principal publications are: "Spiritual Bouquet, Gathered in Spanish and German Gardens of Poesy" (Sulzbach, 1826); "Life and Writings of Heinrich Suso" (Ratisbon, 1829); "Sermons" (Ratisbon, 1841); "Pastoral Letters" (Munster, 1853); "Personal Letters" (Frankfort, 1860).

German composer Georgina Schubert (1840-1878) used Diepenbrock's text for her lieder “Wiegenlied.”

Catholic Church titles
Vacant Title last held by Joseph Knauer	Prince-Bishop of Breslau; 1845–1853	Succeeded by Heinrich Förster
