= Goworów =

- Village
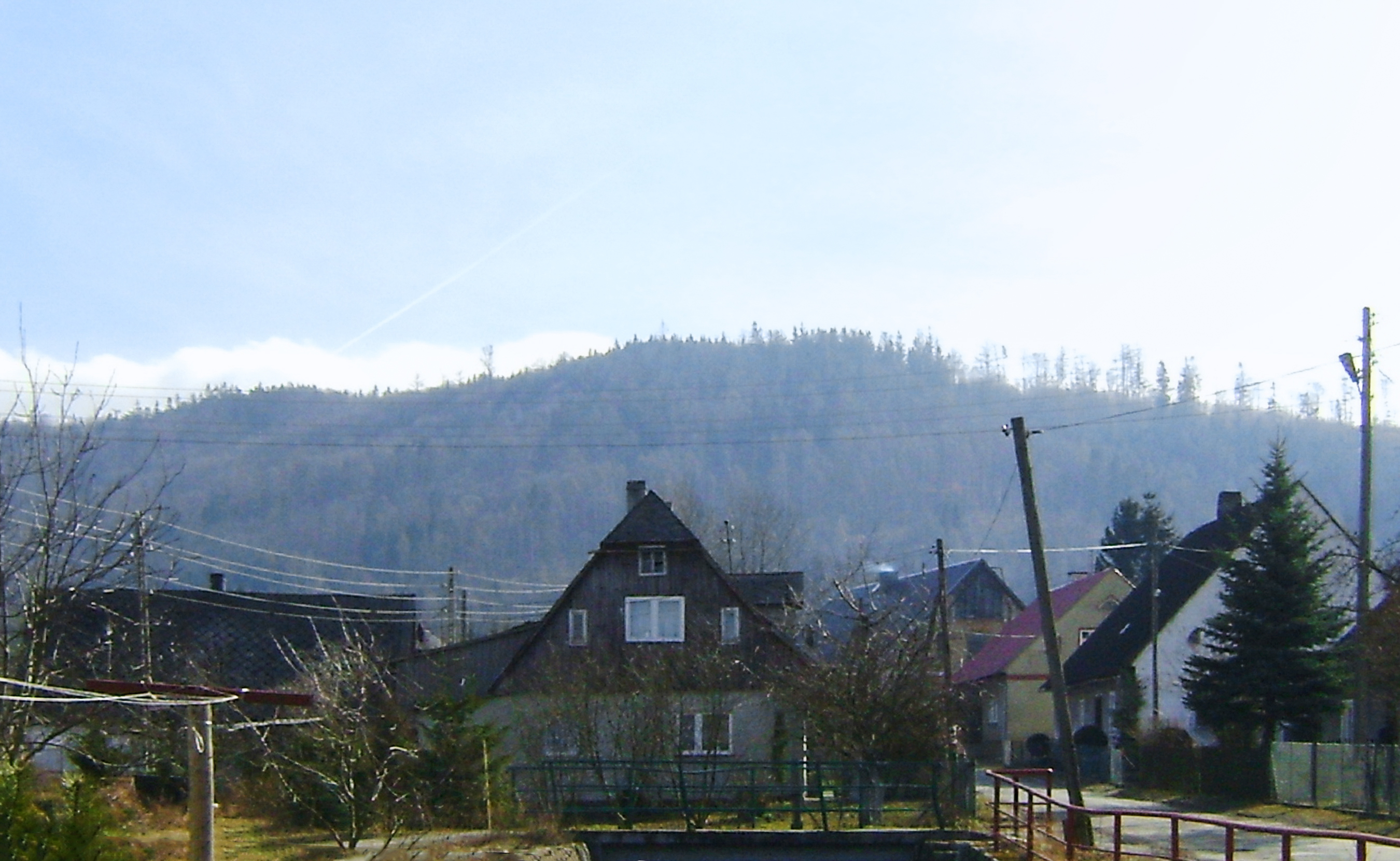

- Location within Poland
- Coordinates: 50°9′N 16°43′E
- Country: Poland
- Voivodeship: Lower Silesian
- County: Kłodzko
- Gmina: Międzylesie
- Elevation (max.): 800 m (2,600 ft)
- Population: 330

Goworów [ɡɔˈvɔruf] is a village in the administrative district of Gmina Międzylesie, within Kłodzko County, Lower Silesian Voivodeship, in south-western Poland.
