= Jaworek, Kłodzko County =

Jaworek
- Village
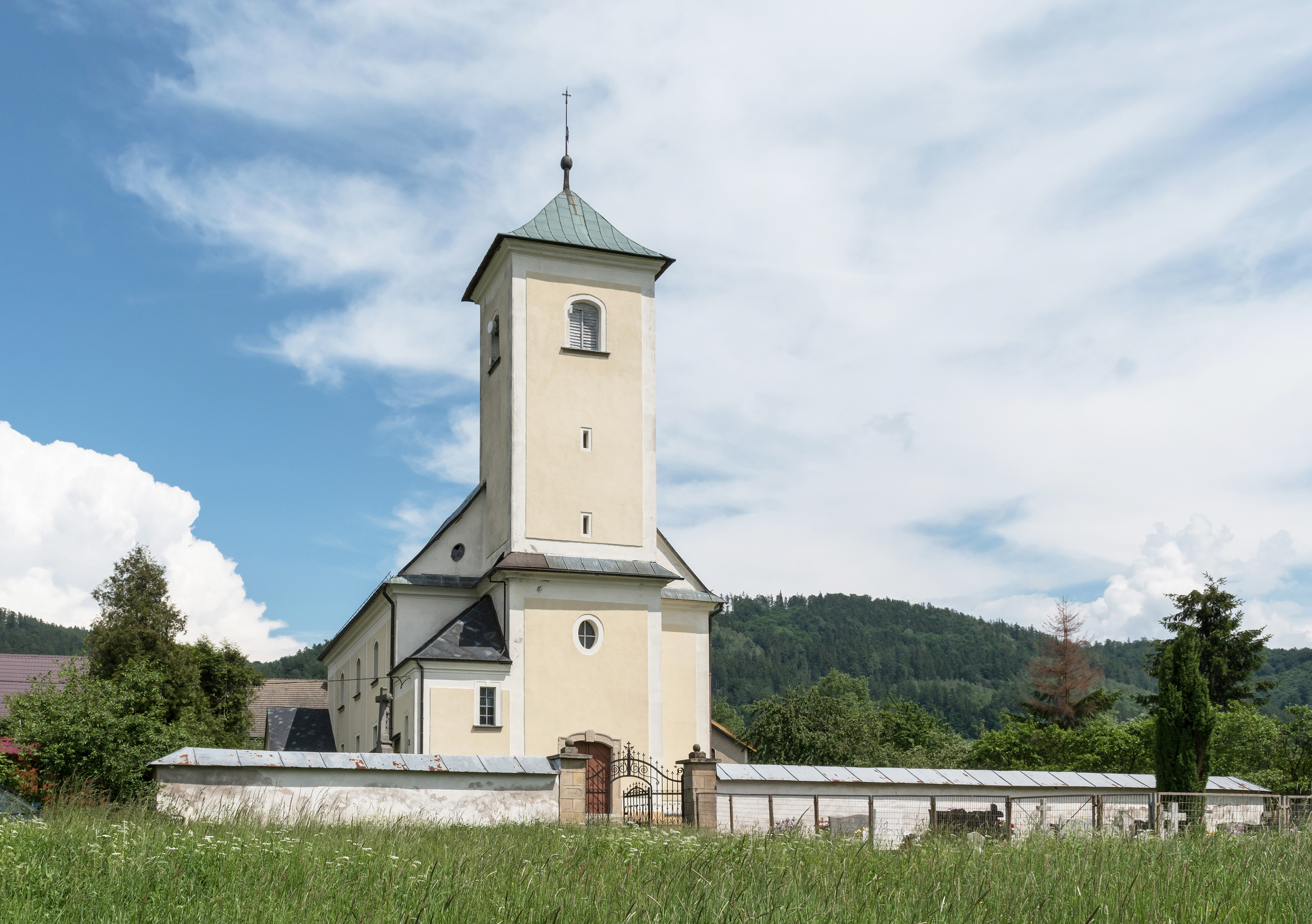
- Saint Barbara church in Jaworek

- Location within Poland
- Coordinates: 50°12′59″N 16°44′13″E
- Country: Poland
- Voivodeship: Lower Silesian
- County: Kłodzko
- Gmina: Międzylesie
- Time zone: UTC+1 (CET)
  - Summer (DST): UTC+2 (CEST)
- Vehicle registration: DKL

Jaworek [jaˈvɔrɛk] is a village in the administrative district of Gmina Międzylesie, within Kłodzko County, Lower Silesian Voivodeship, in south-western Poland.

== Etymology ==
The name of the village is of Slavic origin, and comes from word jawor ("sycamore maple").
