= Niemojów =

- Village
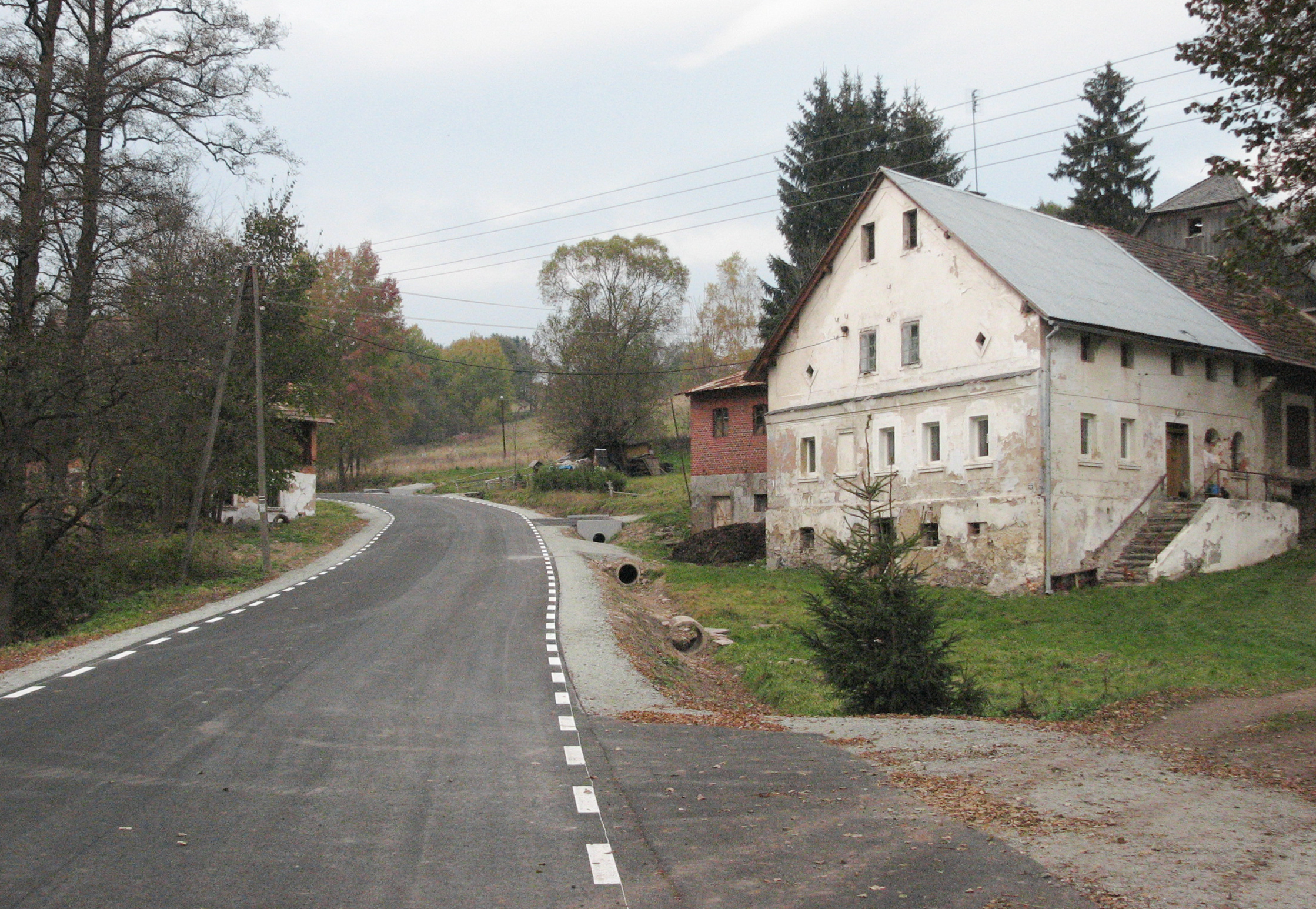

- Location within Poland
- Coordinates: 50°09′N 16°33′E
- Country: Poland
- Voivodeship: Lower Silesian
- County: Kłodzko
- Gmina: Międzylesie
- Elevation: 550 m (1,800 ft)

Niemojów [ɲɛˈmɔjuf] is a village in the administrative district of Gmina Międzylesie, within Kłodzko County, Lower Silesian Voivodeship, in south-western Poland, near the border with the Czech Republic.
