= Nowa Wieś, Kłodzko County =

Nowa Wieś
- Village
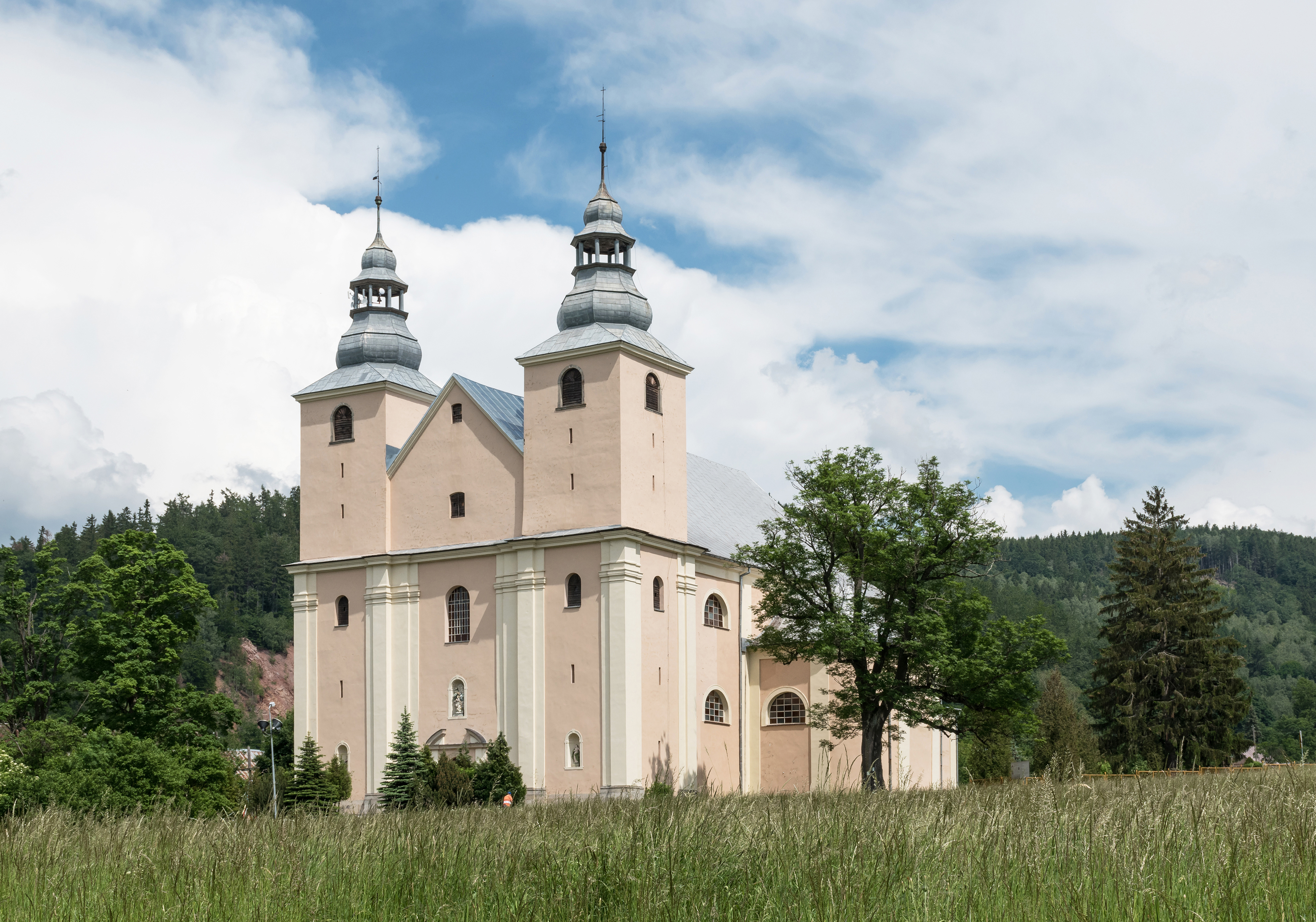

- Location within Poland
- Coordinates: 50°11′56″N 16°44′42″E
- Country: Poland
- Voivodeship: Lower Silesian
- County: Kłodzko
- Gmina: Międzylesie

Nowa Wieś [ˈnɔva ˈvjɛɕ] is a village in the administrative district of Gmina Międzylesie, within Kłodzko County, Lower Silesian Voivodeship, in south-western Poland.
