= Michałowice, Kłodzko County =

Michałowice
- Village

- Location within Poland
- Coordinates: 50°10′51″N 16°42′40″E
- Country: Poland
- Voivodeship: Lower Silesian
- County: Kłodzko
- Gmina: Międzylesie

Michałowice [mixawɔˈvit͡sɛ] is a village in the administrative district of Gmina Międzylesie, within Kłodzko County, Lower Silesian Voivodeship, in south-western Poland.
