= Boboszów =

- Village
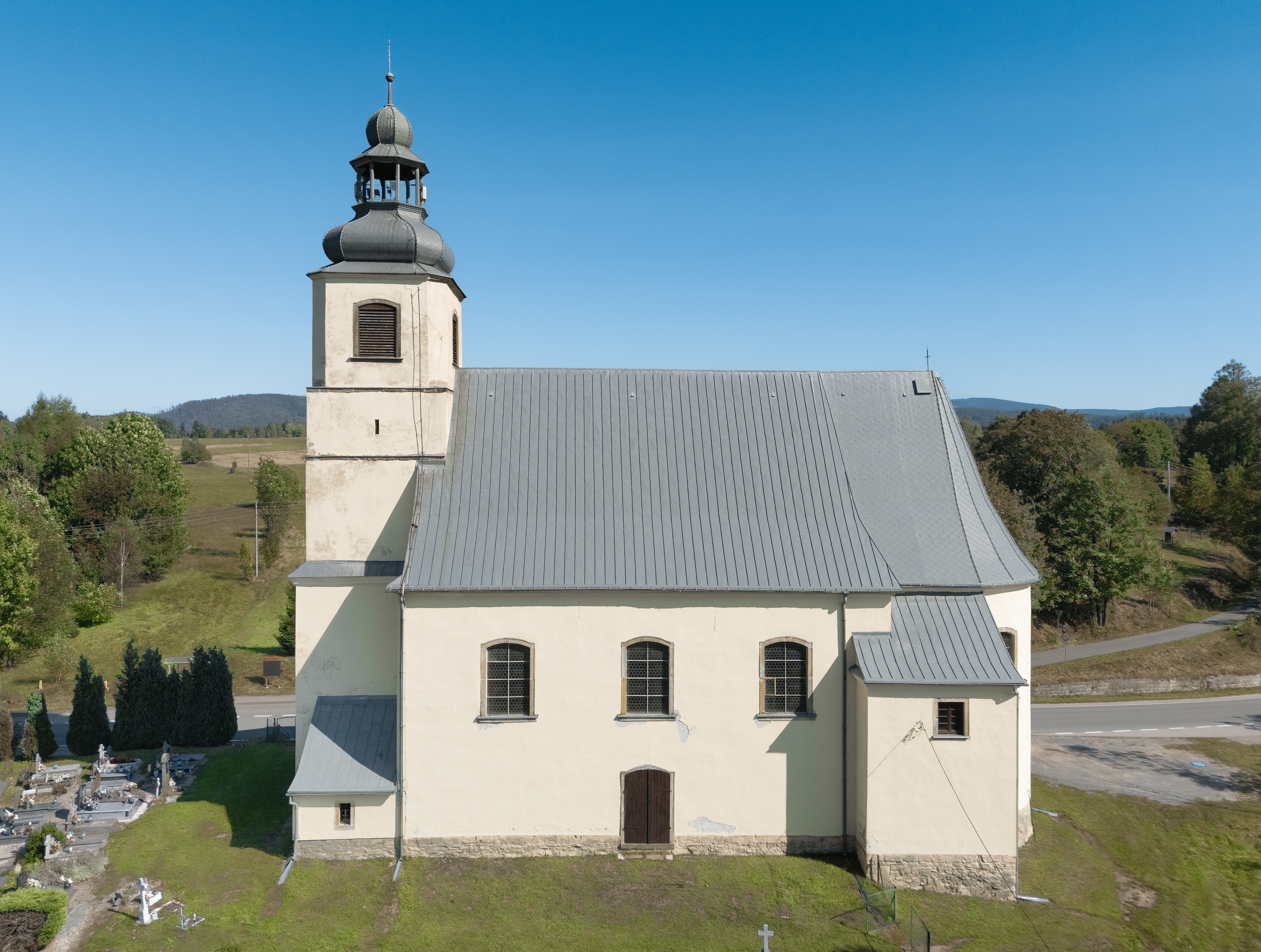
- Church of Saint Anne

- Location within Poland
- Coordinates: 50°6′N 16°42′E
- Country: Poland
- Voivodeship: Lower Silesian
- County: Kłodzko
- Gmina: Międzylesie
- Elevation (max.): 520 m (1,710 ft)

Population
  - Total: 240

Boboszów [bɔˈbɔʂuf] is a village in the administrative district of Gmina Międzylesie, within Kłodzko County, Lower Silesian Voivodeship, in south-western Poland, near the border with the Czech Republic.
