= Gmina Międzylesie =

Gmina Międzylesie Międzylesie Commune
- Gmina
- Flag Coat of arms
- Interactive map of Gmina Międzylesie
- Coordinates (Międzylesie): 50°8′58″N 16°39′59″E
- Country: Poland
- Voivodeship: Lower Silesian
- County: Kłodzko
- Seat: Międzylesie
- Sołectwos: Boboszów, Czerwony Strumień, Długopole Górne, Dolnik, Domaszków, Gajnik, Gniewoszów, Goworów, Jaworek, Jodłów, Kamieńczyk, Lesica, Michałowice, Nagodzice, Niemojów, Nowa Wieś, Pisary, Potoczek, Różanka, Roztoki, Smreczyna, Szklarnia

Area
  - Total: 189.03 km^{2} (72.98 sq mi)

Population (2019-06-30)
  - Total: 7,186
  - Density: 38.02/km^{2} (98.46/sq mi)
- Website: http://www.miedzylesie.pl/

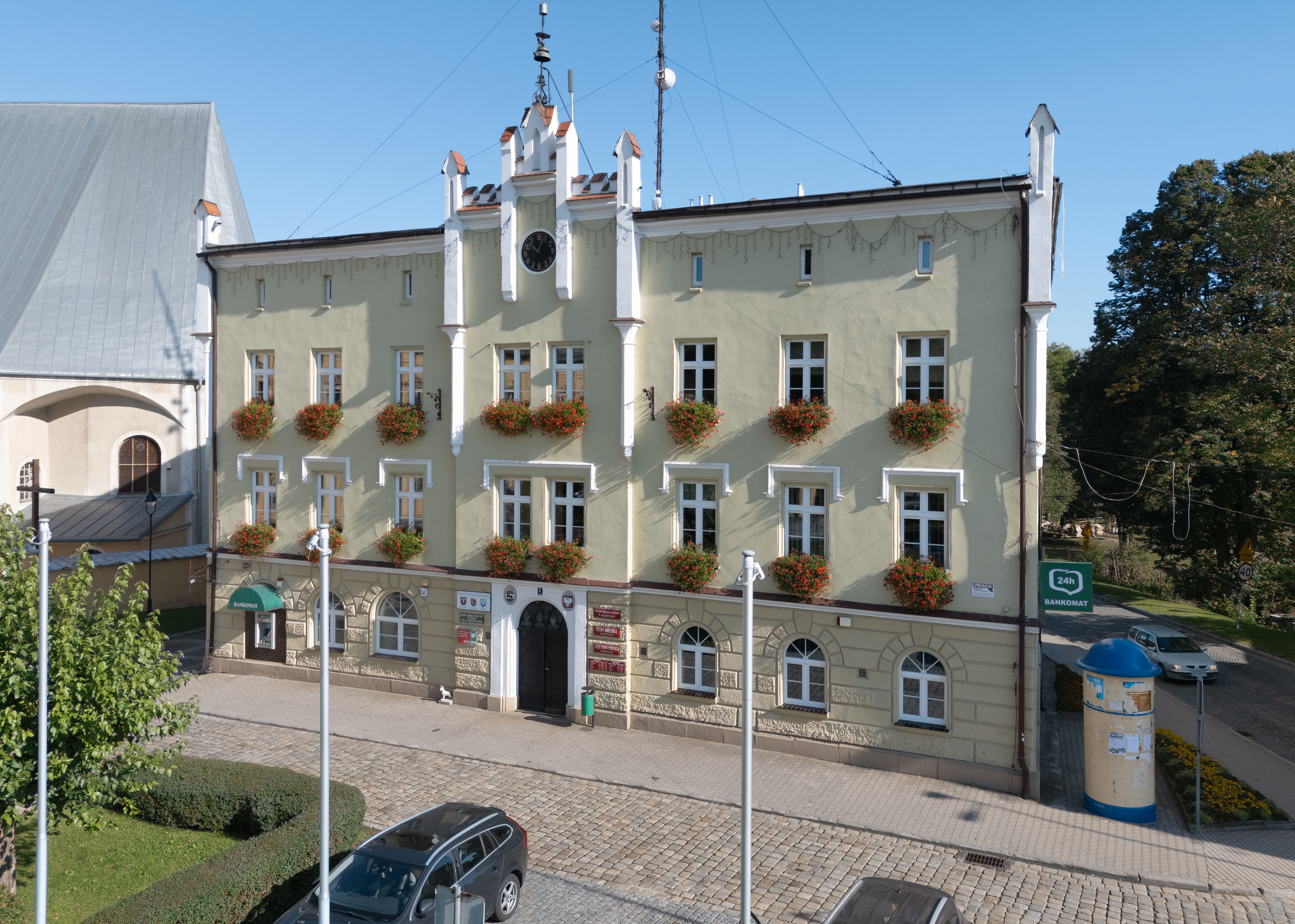

Gmina Międzylesie is an urban-rural gmina (administrative district) in Kłodzko County, Lower Silesian Voivodeship, in south-western Poland. Its seat is the town of Międzylesie, which lies approximately 33 kilometres (21 mi) south of Kłodzko, and 112 kilometres (70 mi) south of the regional capital Wrocław.

The gmina covers an area of 189.03 square kilometres (73.0 sq mi), and as of 2019 its total population is 7,186.

== Neighbouring gminas ==
Gmina Międzylesie is bordered by the gminas of Bystrzyca Kłodzka and Stronie Śląskie. It also borders the Czech Republic.

== Villages ==
Apart from the town of Międzylesie, the gmina contains the villages of Boboszów, Czerwony Strumień, Długopole Górne, Dolnik, Domaszków, Gajnik, Gniewoszów, Goworów, Jaworek, Jodłów, Kamieńczyk, Lesica, Michałowice, Nagodzice, Niemojów, Nowa Wieś, Pisary, Potoczek, Różanka, Roztoki, Smreczyna and Szklarnia.

== Twin towns – sister cities ==
Gmina Międzylesie is twinned with:

- Dolsk, Poland
- Králíky, Czech Republic
- Lohne, Germany
