= Szklarnia, Lower Silesian Voivodeship =

Szklarnia
- Village
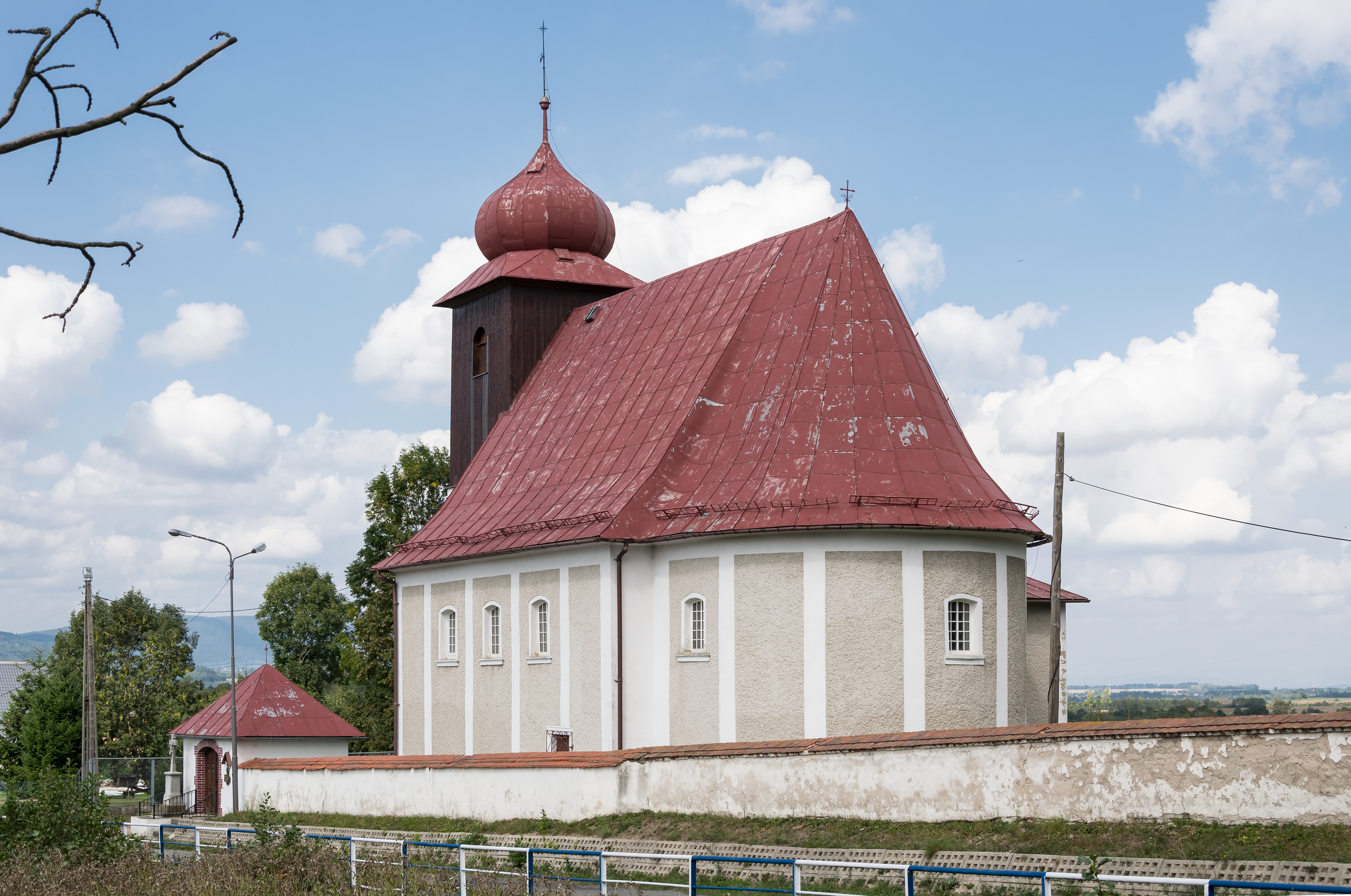
- Church of Saint Florian

- Location within Poland
- Coordinates: 50°9′26″N 16°42′11″E
- Country: Poland
- Voivodeship: Lower Silesian
- County: Kłodzko
- Gmina: Międzylesie

Szklarnia [ˈʂklarɲa] is a village in the administrative district of Gmina Międzylesie, within Kłodzko County, Lower Silesian Voivodeship, in south-western Poland.
