= Domaszków, Kłodzko County =

Domaszków
- Village
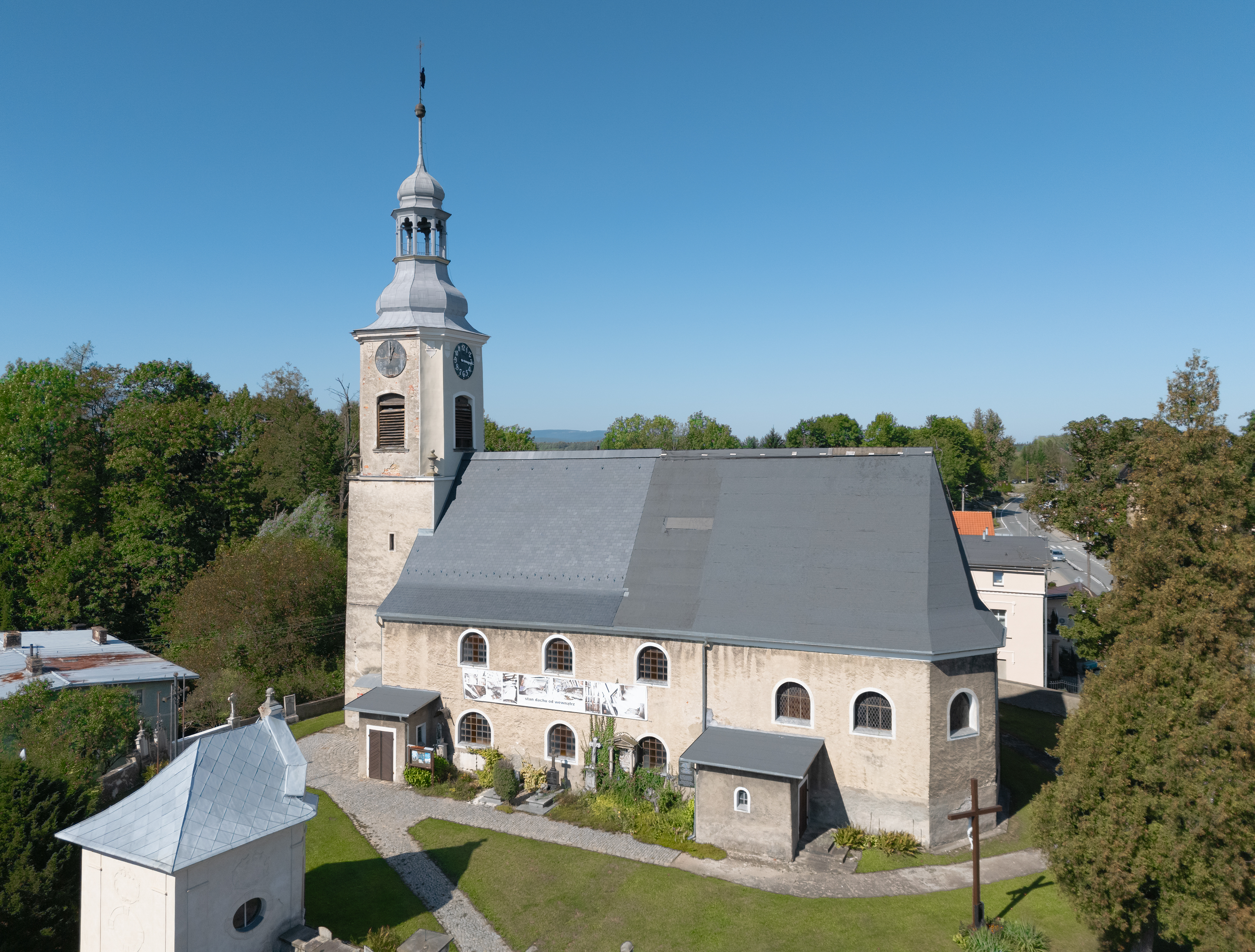

- Location within Poland
- Coordinates: 50°12′56″N 16°40′46″E
- Country: Poland
- Voivodeship: Lower Silesian
- County: Kłodzko
- Gmina: Międzylesie
- Elevation: 420 m (1,380 ft)
- Population: 1,300

Domaszków [dɔˈmaʂkuf] is a village in the administrative district of Gmina Międzylesie, within Kłodzko County, Lower Silesian Voivodeship, in south-western Poland.
