= Różanka, Lower Silesian Voivodeship =

Różanka
- Village
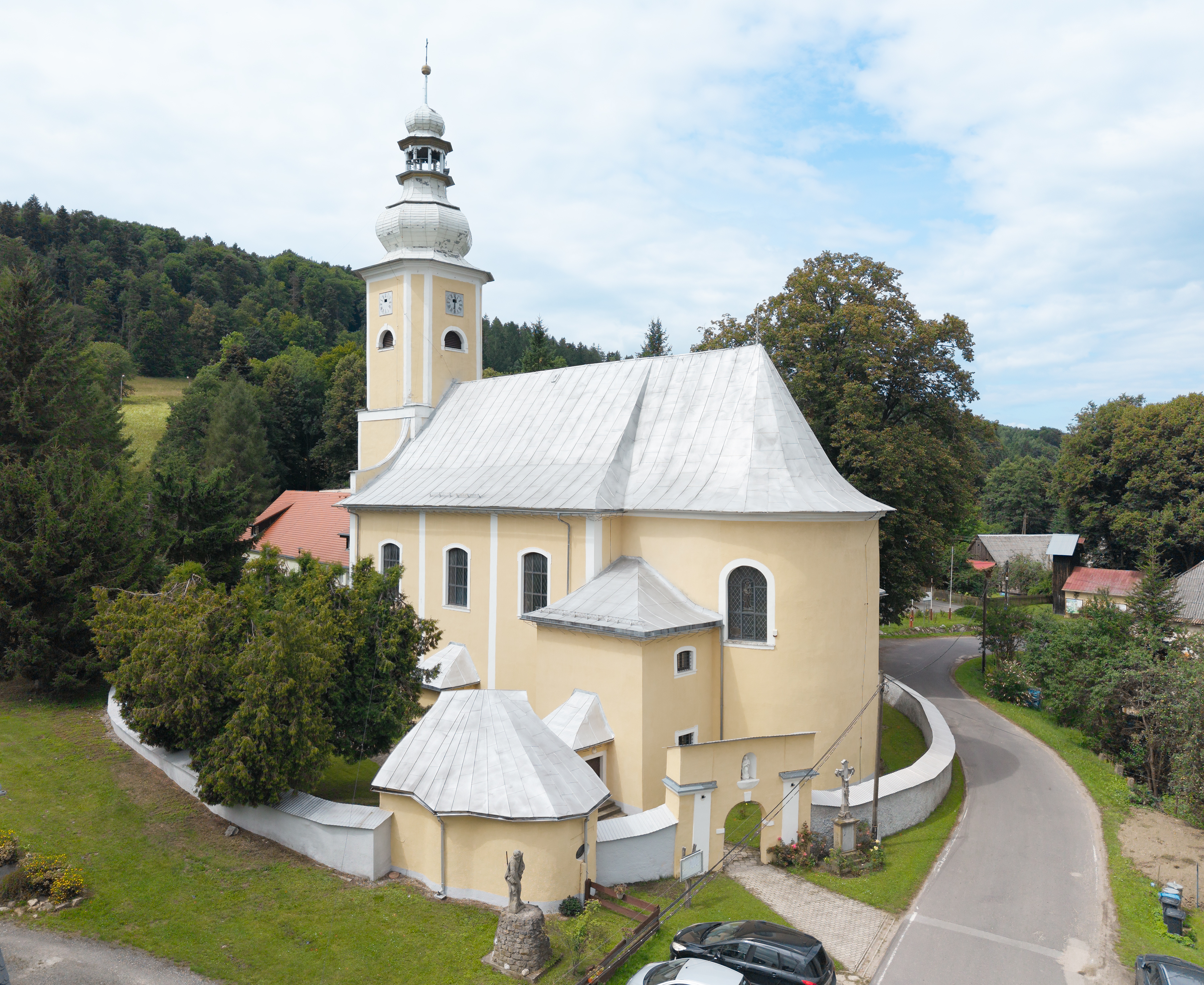
- Catholic church

- Location within Poland
- Coordinates: 50°11′N 16°38′E
- Country: Poland
- Voivodeship: Lower Silesian
- County: Kłodzko
- Gmina: Międzylesie

Różanka ([ruˈʐaŋka]; German: Rosenthal) is a village in the administrative district of Gmina Międzylesie, within Kłodzko County, Lower Silesian Voivodeship, in south-western Poland.
