= Dolnik, Lower Silesian Voivodeship =

Dolnik
- Village
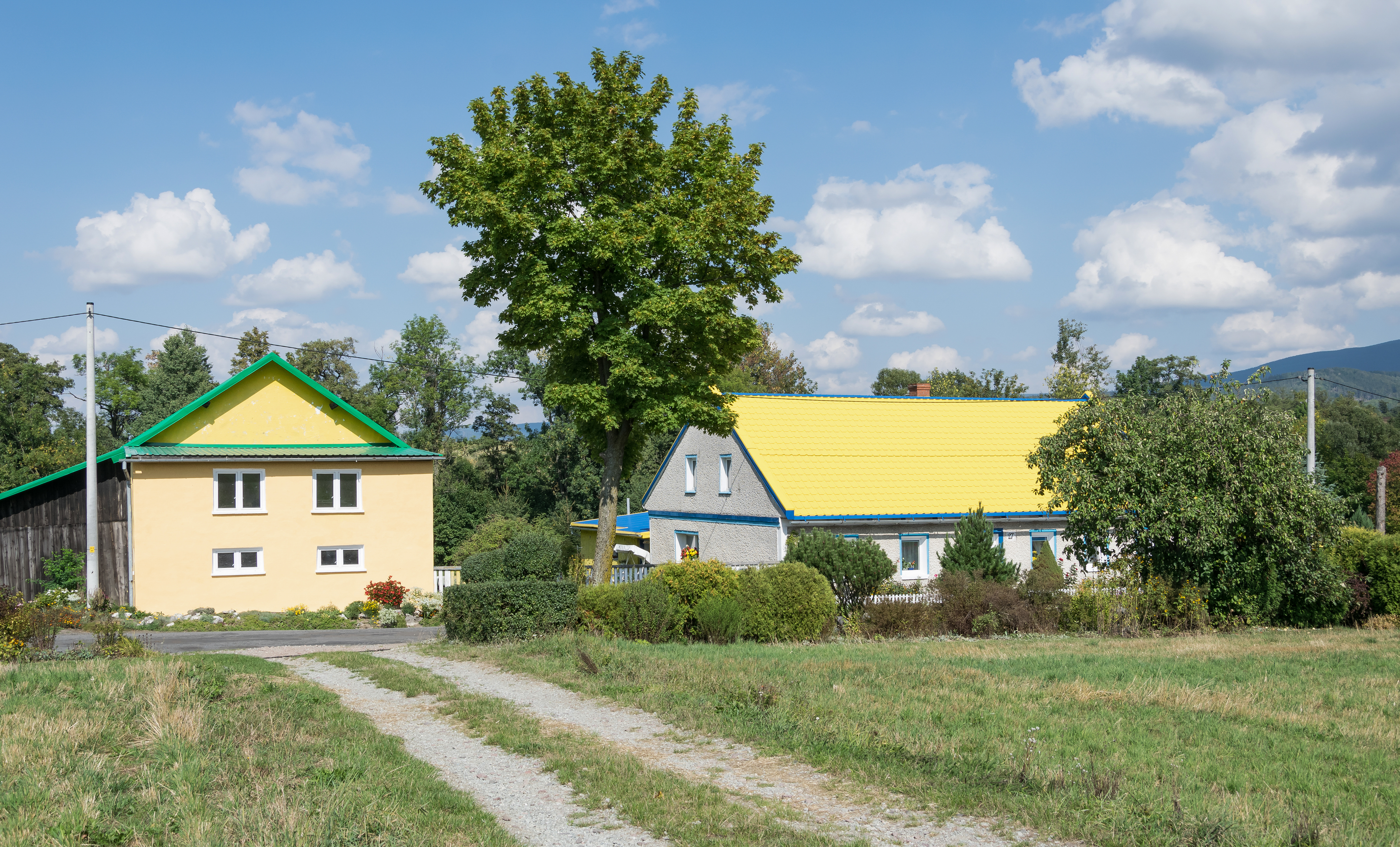

- Location within Poland
- Coordinates: 50°08′36″N 16°41′47″E
- Country: Poland
- Voivodeship: Lower Silesian
- County: Kłodzko
- Gmina: Międzylesie

Dolnik [ˈdɔlnik] is a village in the administrative district of Gmina Międzylesie, within Kłodzko County, Lower Silesian Voivodeship, in south-western Poland.
