= Roztoki, Lower Silesian Voivodeship =

Roztoki
- Village
- Location within Poland
- Coordinates: 50°11′30″N 16°40′13″E
- Country: Poland
- Voivodeship: Lower Silesian
- County: Kłodzko
- Gmina: Międzylesie

Roztoki [rɔsˈtɔki] is a village in the administrative district of Gmina Międzylesie, within Kłodzko County, Lower Silesian Voivodeship, in south-western Poland.

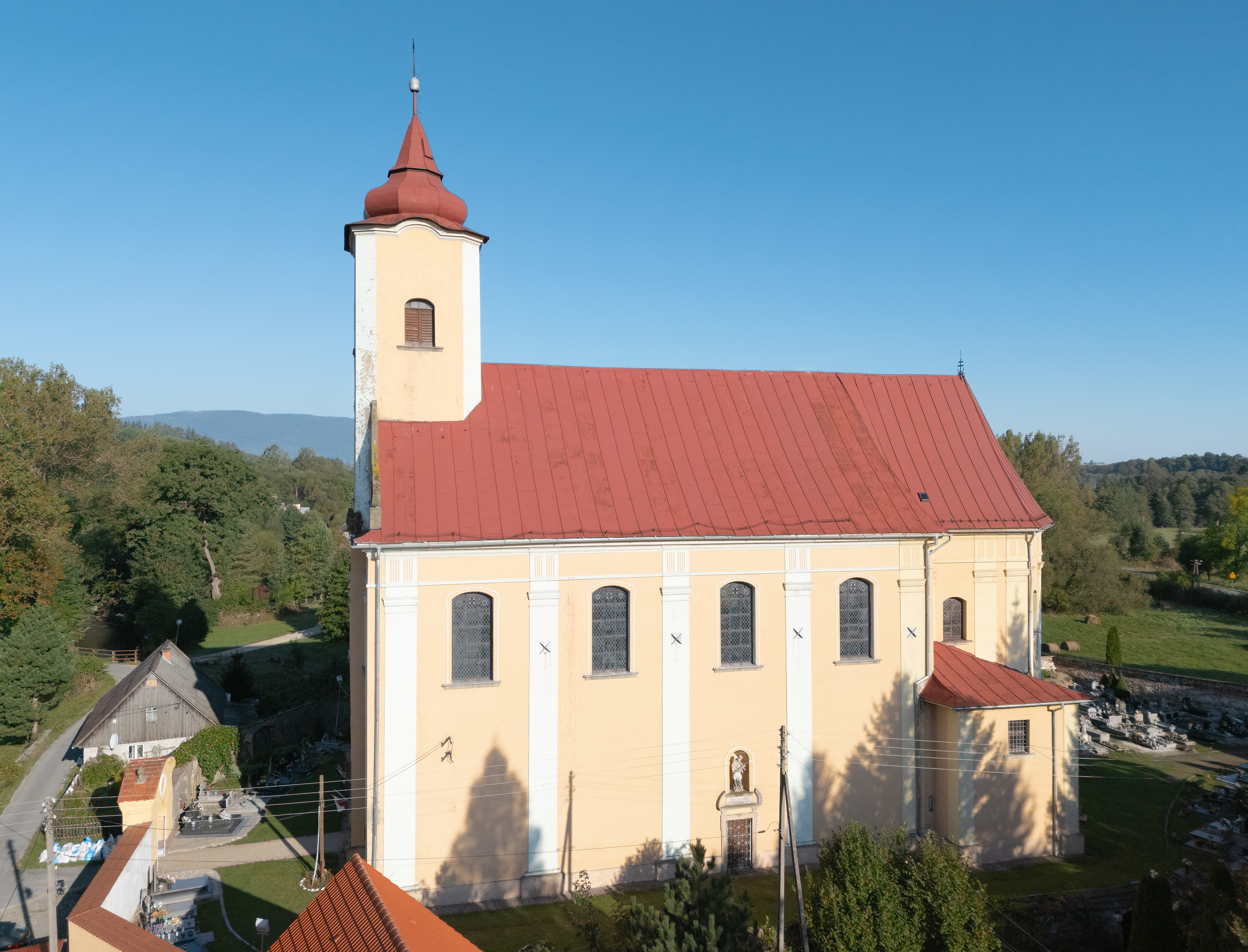
Saint Martin church in Roztoki
