= Jodłów, Lower Silesian Voivodeship =

Jodłów
- Village
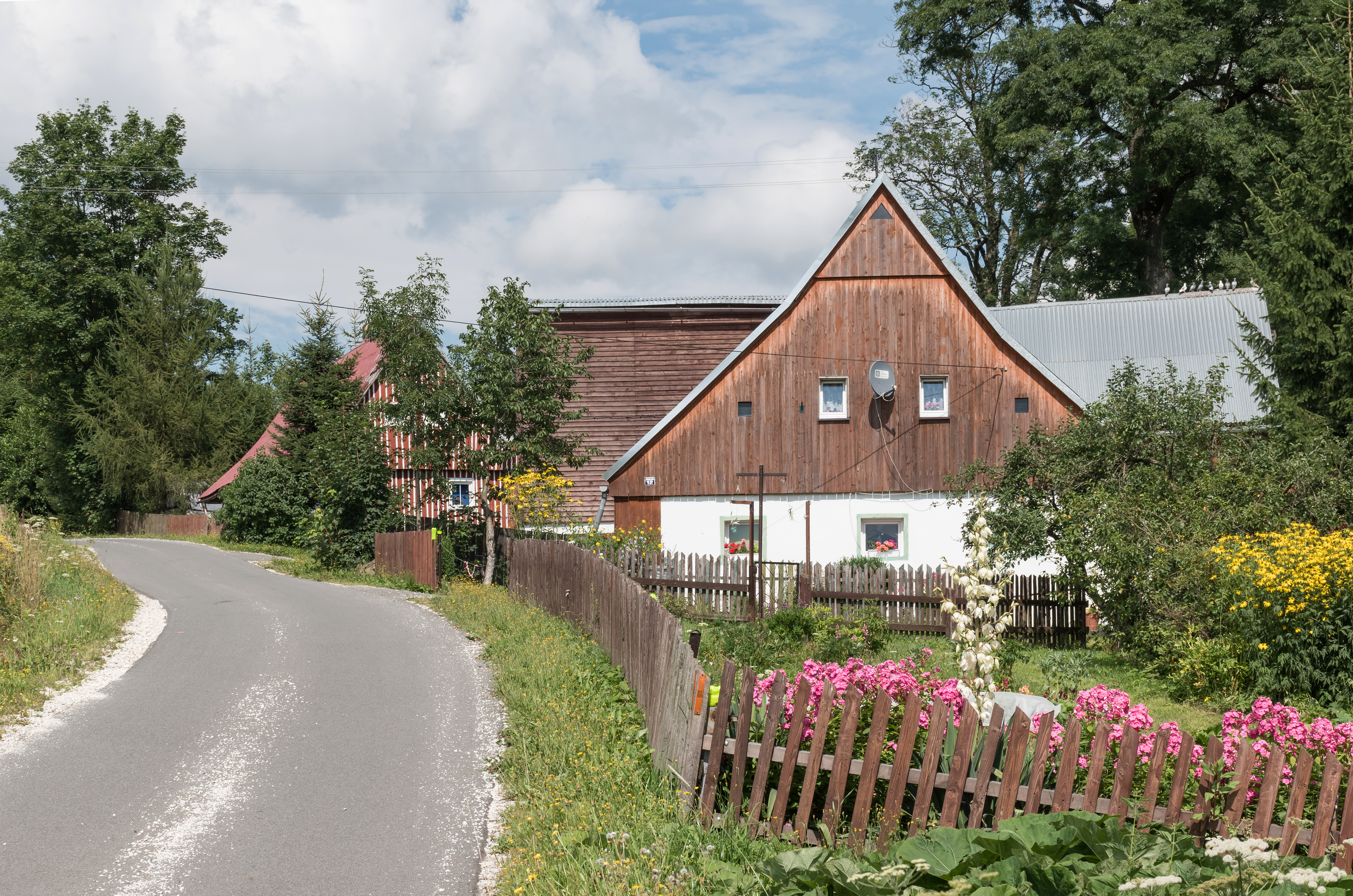

- Location within Poland
- Coordinates: 50°09′45″N 16°45′08″E
- Country: Poland
- Voivodeship: Lower Silesian
- County: Kłodzko
- Gmina: Międzylesie

Jodłów [ˈjɔdwuf] is a village in the administrative district of Gmina Międzylesie, within Kłodzko County, Lower Silesian Voivodeship, in south-western Poland.
