= Międzylesie =

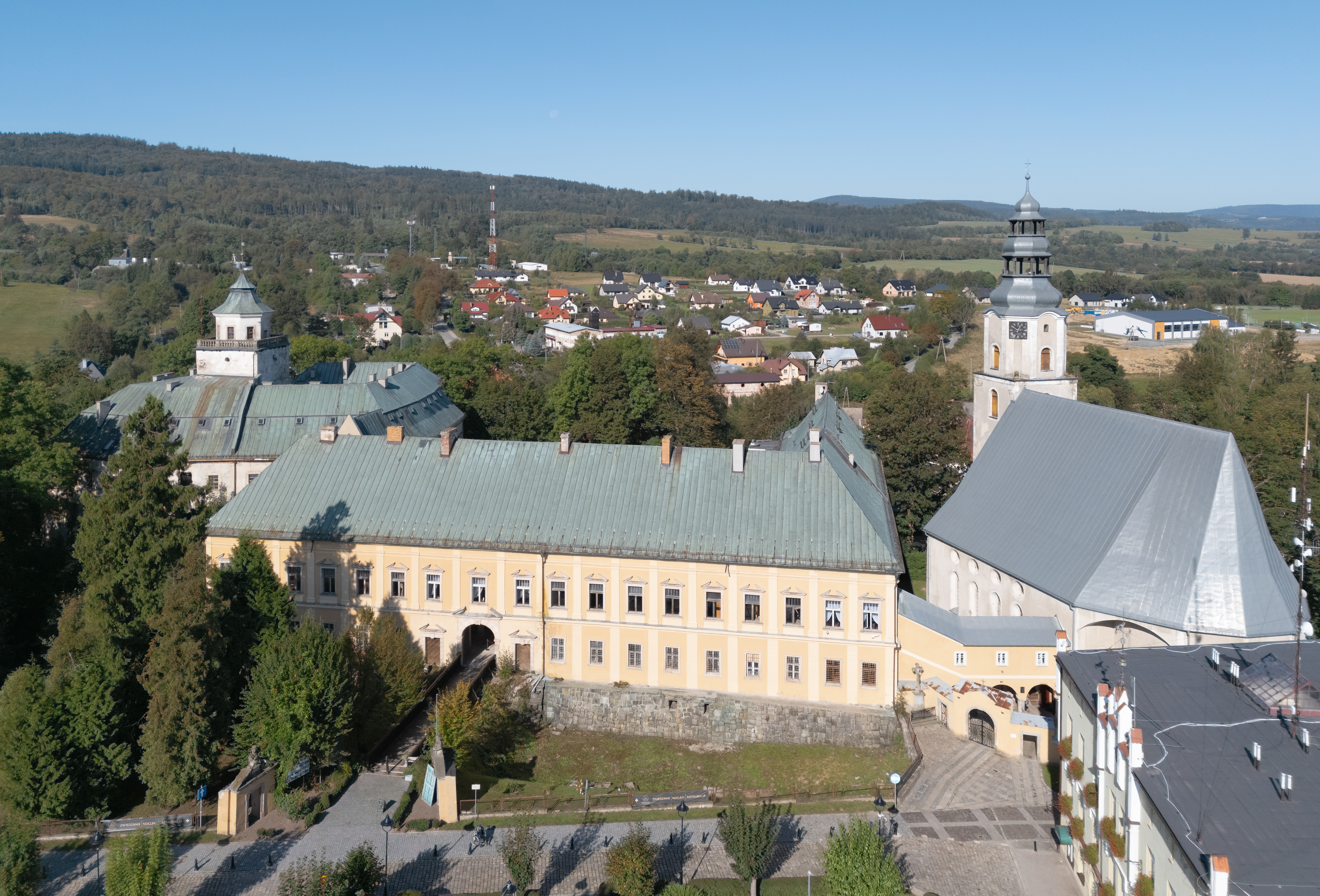
- Castle and Corpus Christi church

- Flag Coat of arms

- Location within Poland
- Coordinates: 50°8′58″N 16°39′59″E
- Country: Poland
- Voivodeship: Lower Silesian
- County: Kłodzko
- Gmina: Międzylesie

Area
  - Total: 14.37 km^{2} (5.55 sq mi)

Population (2019-06-30)
  - Total: 2,575
  - Density: 179.2/km^{2} (464.1/sq mi)
- Time zone: UTC+1 (CET)
  - Summer (DST): UTC+2 (CEST)
- Vehicle registration: DKL
- Website: http://www.miedzylesie.pl

Międzylesie [mʲɛnd͡zɨˈlɛɕɛ] (German: Mittelwalde) is a town in Kłodzko County, Lower Silesian Voivodeship, in south-western Poland. It is the seat of the administrative district (gmina) called Gmina Międzylesie.

As at 2019, the town has a population of 2,575.

== Geography ==
It is located in the Kłodzko Land, on the Nysa Kłodzka River, close to the Czech border.

== History ==
It was granted town rights before 1290. It was ravaged by the Hussites in 1428. In 1590, Protestants took over the local church and appointed their preacher, but in 1625 the Catholic parish priest returned. During the Thirty Years' War, in 1625, the town was burned by the Swedes. It was rebuilt only in 1676. The local church received a painting of the Madonna, given by Pope Innocent XI to King John III Sobieski of Poland after his victory at Vienna in 1683.
