= Gniewoszów, Lower Silesian Voivodeship =

Gniewoszów
- Village
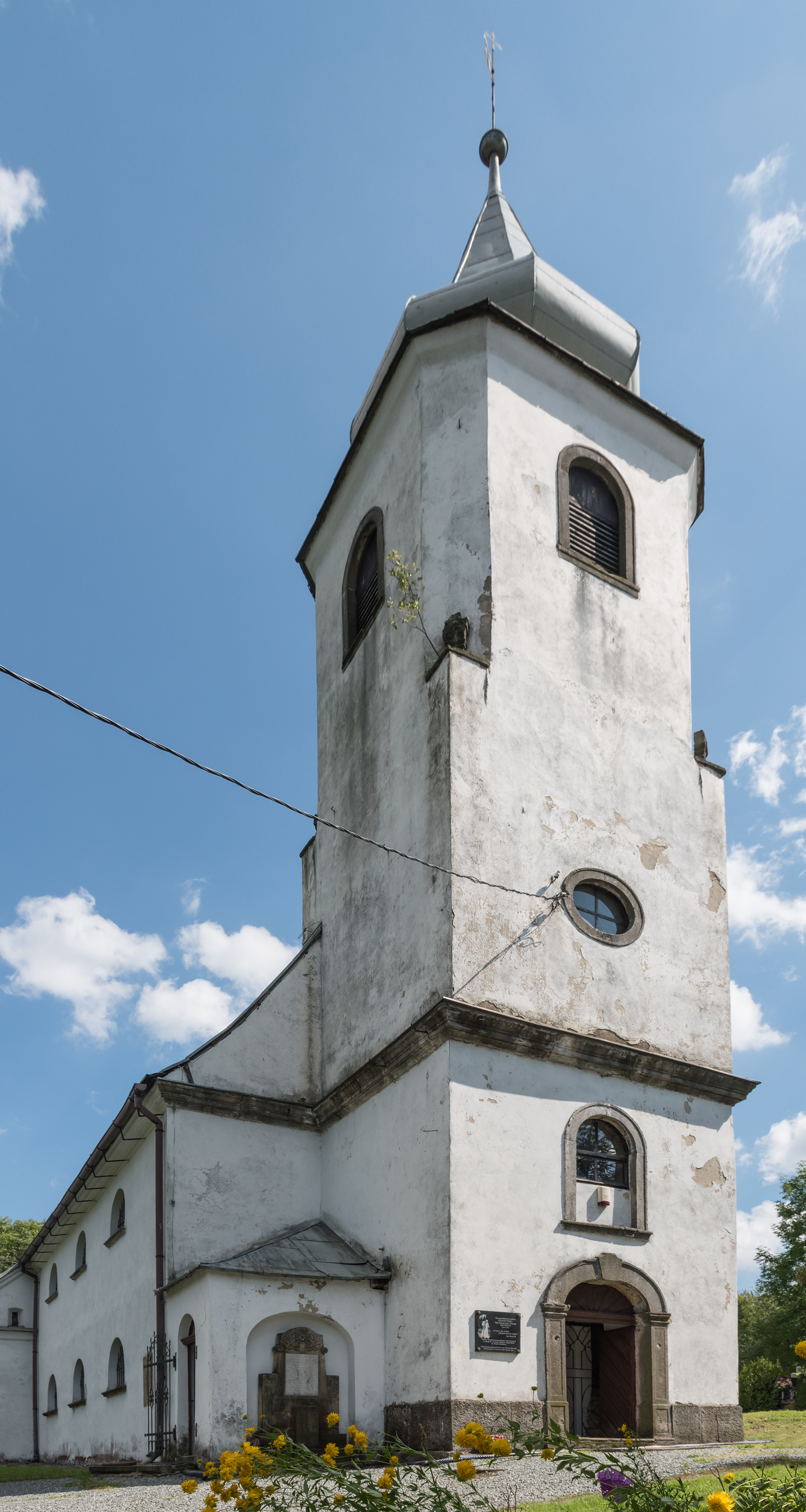
- Church of Saint Michael Archangel

- Location within Poland
- Coordinates: 50°12′07″N 16°36′16″E
- Country: Poland
- Voivodeship: Lower Silesian
- County: Kłodzko
- Gmina: Międzylesie
- Time zone: UTC+1 (CET)
  - Summer (DST): UTC+2 (CEST)
- Vehicle registration: DKL

Gniewoszów [ɡɲɛˈvɔʂuf] is a village in the administrative district of Gmina Międzylesie, within Kłodzko County, Lower Silesian Voivodeship, in south-western Poland on Central Sudetes mountain range.
