= Czerwony Strumień =

Czerwony Strumień Rothflössel
- village
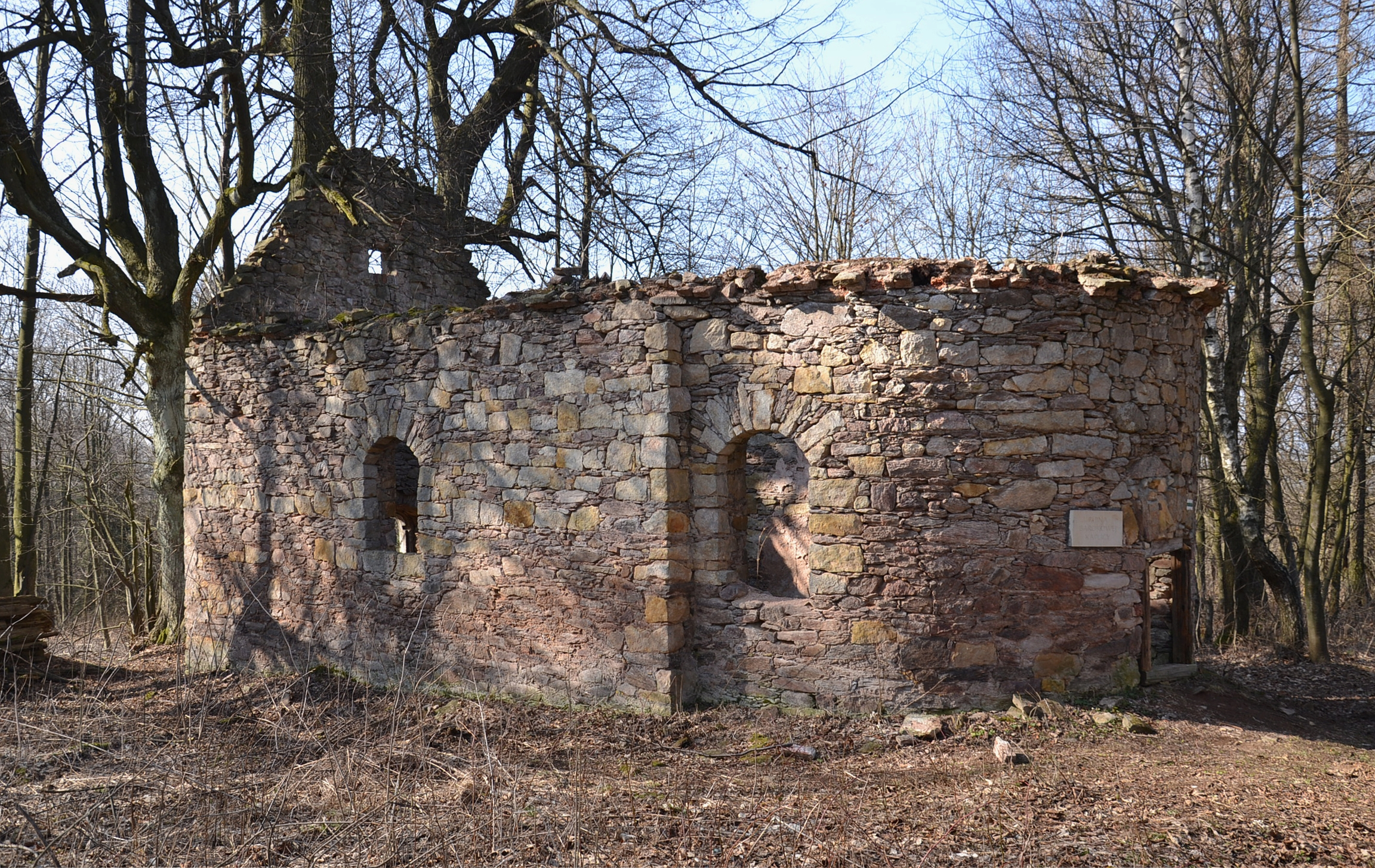
- Ruins of the chapel

- Location within Poland
- Coordinates: 50°07′50″N 16°37′29″E
- Country: Poland
- Voivodeship: Lower Silesian
- County: Kłodzko
- Gmina: Międzylesie

Population
  - Total: 0

Czerwony Strumień [t͡ʂɛrˈvɔnɨ ˈstrumjɛɲ] (German: Rothflössel Czech: Červený) is an abandoned village in the administrative district of Gmina Międzylesie, within Kłodzko County, Lower Silesian Voivodeship, in south-western Poland.
