= Kamieńczyk, Lower Silesian Voivodeship =

Kamieńczyk
- Village
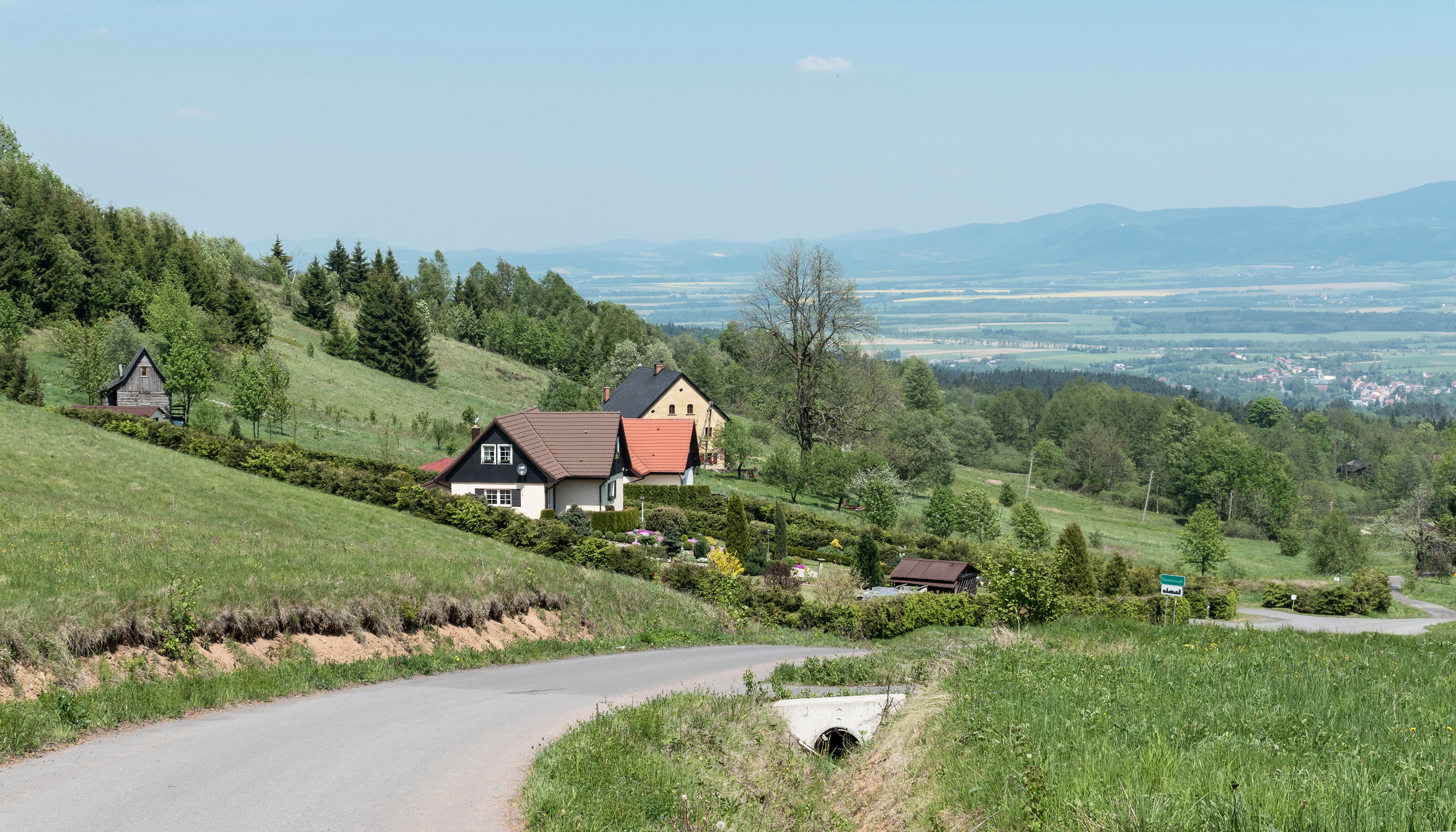

- Location within Poland
- Coordinates: 50°06′N 16°39′E
- Country: Poland
- Voivodeship: Lower Silesian
- County: Kłodzko
- Gmina: Międzylesie
- Highest elevation: 680 m (2,230 ft)

Kamieńczyk (Polish pronunciation: [kaˈmjɛj̃tʂɨk]) is a village in the administrative district of Gmina Międzylesie, within Kłodzko County, Lower Silesian Voivodeship, in south-western Poland, near the border with the Czech Republic.
