= Archdiocese of Wrocław =

Roman Catholic archdiocese in Poland

Coordinates: 51.114174°N 17.046581°E

Archdiocese of Wrocław Archidioecesis Vratislaviensis Archidiecezja Wrocławska

Catholic
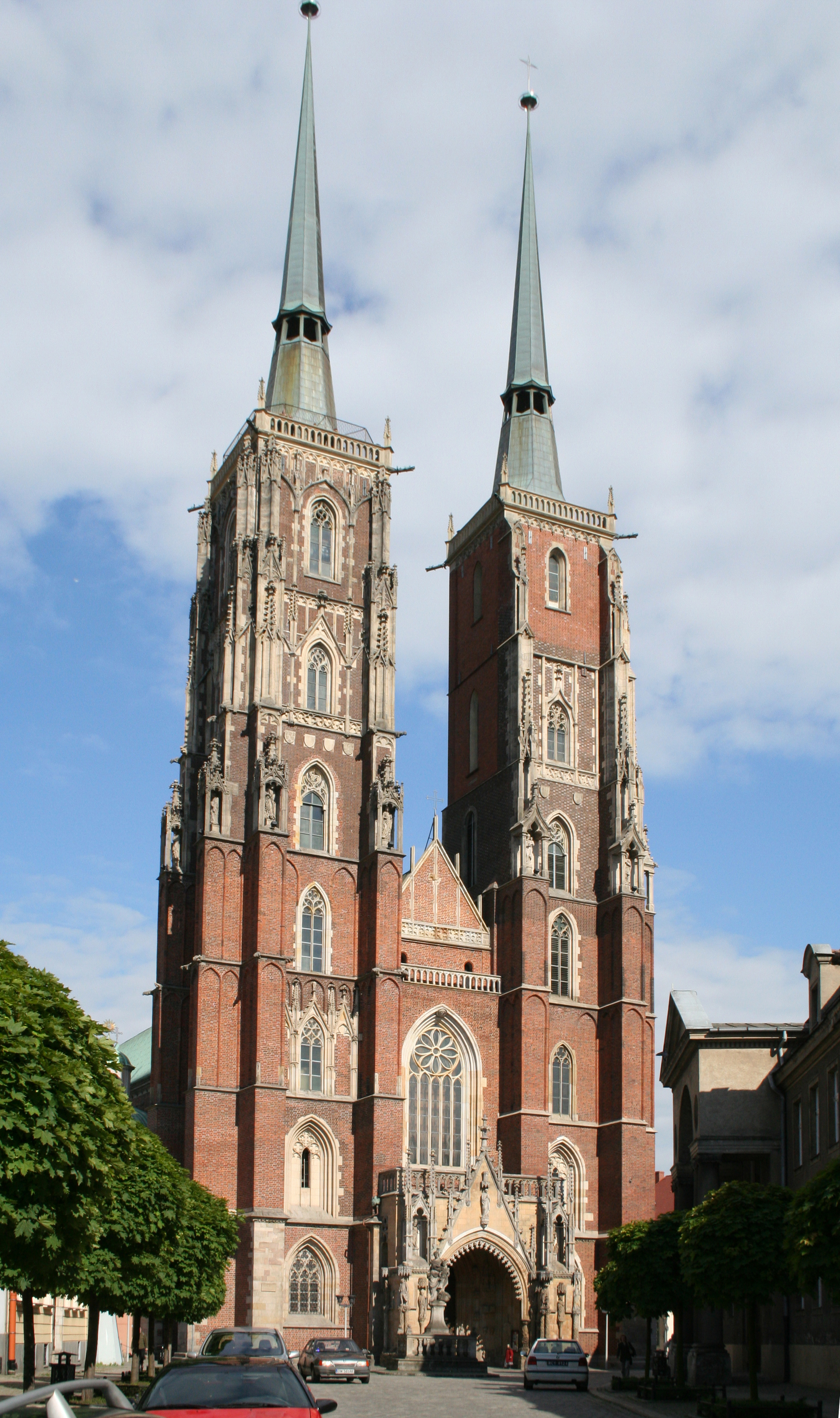
- Cathedral of St. John in Wrocław, centre of the archdiocese

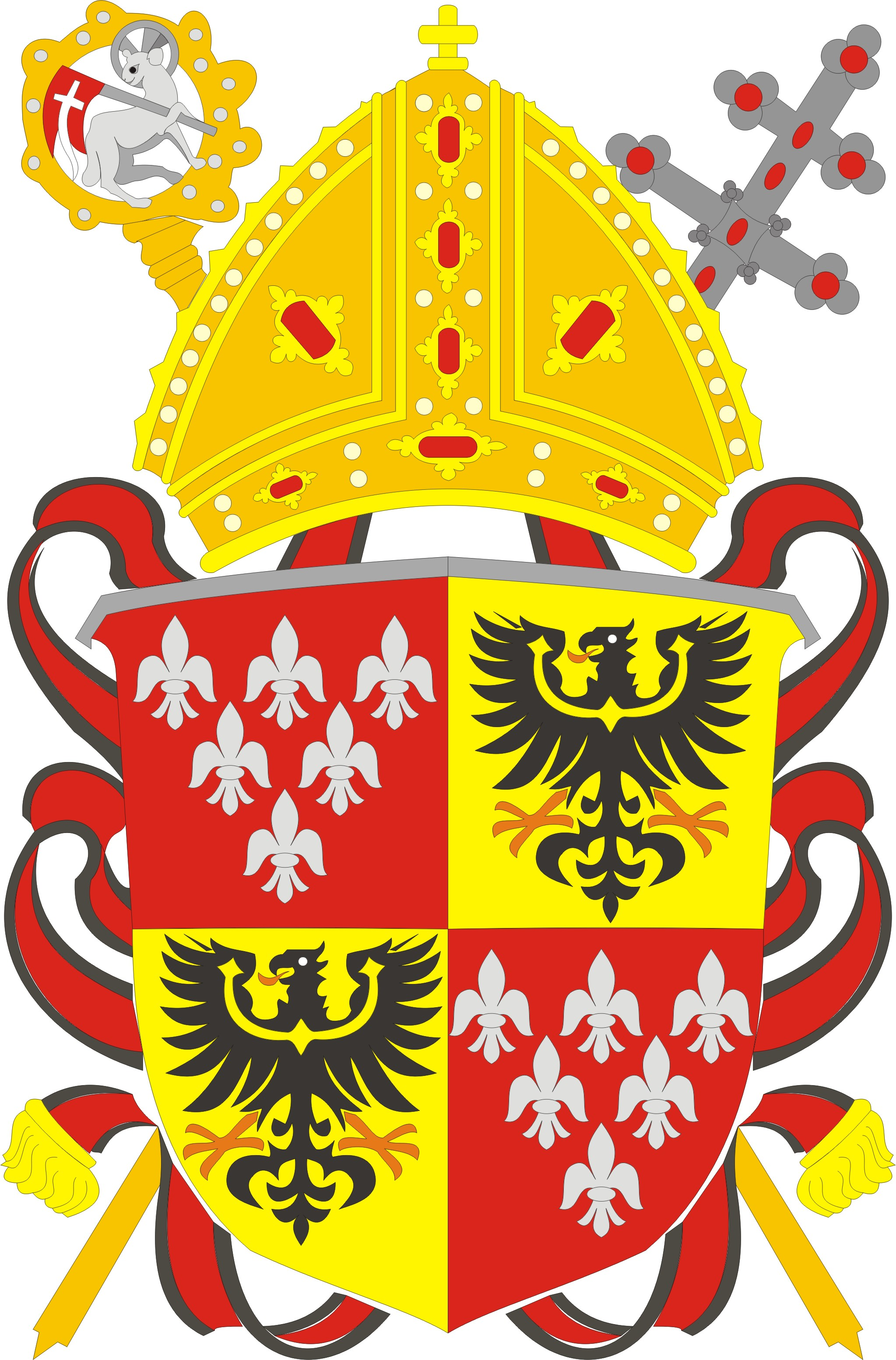
- Coat of arms

Location
- Country: Poland
- Ecclesiastical province: Ecclesiastical province of Wrocław

Statistics
- Area: 8,850 km^{2} (3,420 sq mi)
- Population: Total; Catholics: (as of 2020); 1,203,873; 999,214 (83%)

Information
- Denomination: Catholic Church
- Sui iuris church: Latin Church
- Rite: Roman Rite
- Established: 10th Century (As Diocese of Wrocław); 13 August 1930 (As Archdiocese of Wrocław)
- Cathedral: Cathedral of St. John the Baptist in Wrocław

Current leadership
- Pope: Leo XIV
- Metropolitan Archbishop: Józef Kupny
- Suffragans: Diocese of Legnica; Diocese of Świdnica
- Auxiliary Bishops: Jacek Kiciński CMF; Maciej Małyga

Map

Website
- archidiecezja.wroc.pl

The Archdiocese of Wrocław (Polish: Archidiecezja wrocławska; German: Erzbistum Breslau; Czech: Arcidiecéze vratislavská; Latin: Archidioecesis Vratislaviensis) is a Latin Church ecclesiastical territory or archdiocese of the Catholic Church centered in the city of Wrocław in Poland. From its founding as a bishopric in 1000 until 1821, it was under the Archbishopric of Gniezno in Greater Poland. From 1821 to 1930 it was subjected directly to the Apostolic See. Between 1821 and 1972 it was officially known as (Arch)Diocese of Breslau.

== History ==
=== Medieval era (within Poland) ===
Christianity was first introduced into Silesia by missionaries from Moravia and Bohemia. After the conversion of Duke Mieszko I of Poland and the conquest of Silesia, the work of bringing the people to the new faith went on more rapidly. Up to about the year 1000 Silesia had no bishop of its own, but was united with neighbouring dioceses. The upper part of the Oder River formed the boundary of the Kingdom of Poland. All the territory which is now Silesia – lying on the right-hand bank of the Oder – belonged, therefore, to the Diocese of Poznań, which was suffragan to the Archbishopric of Magdeburg. This part of Silesia was thus under the jurisdiction of a priest named Jordan who was appointed first Bishop of Poznań in 968. The part of Silesia lying on the left bank of the Oder belonged to the territory included in then Bohemia, and was consequently within the diocesan jurisdiction of Prague. The Bishopric of Prague, founded in 973, was suffragan to the Archbishopric of Mainz.

Duke Bolesław I the Brave, the son of Mieszko, obtained the Bohemian part of Silesia during his wars of conquest, and a change in the ecclesiastical dependence of the province followed. By a patent of Emperor Otto III in 995, Silesia was attached to the Bishopric of Meissen, which, like Poznań, was suffragan to the Archbishopric of Magdeburg. Soon after, Bolesław, who ruled all of Silesia, and emperor Otto, to whom Bolesław had pledged allegiance, founded the Diocese of Wrocław, which, together with the Bishoprics of Kraków and Kołobrzeg, was placed under the Archbishopric of Gniezno in Greater Poland, founded by Otto in 1000 during the Congress of Gniezno. The first Bishop of Wrocław is said to have been named Jan, but nothing more than this is known of him, nor is there extant any official document giving the boundaries of the diocese at the time of its erection. However, they are defined in the Bulls of approval and protection issued by Pope Adrian IV, 23 April 1155, and by Pope Innocent IV, 9 August 1245.

The powerful Polish ruler Bolesław I was succeeded by his son Mieszko II Lambert, who had but a short reign. After his death a revolt against Christianity and the reigning family broke out, the new Church organization of Poland disappeared from view, and the names of the Bishops of Wrocław for the next half century are unknown. Casimir I, the son of Mieszko, and his mother were driven out of the country, but through German aid they returned and the affairs of the Church were brought into better order. A Bishop of Wrocław from probably 1051 to 1062 was Hieronymus, said by later tradition to have been a Roman nobleman. He was followed by John (1062–72), who was succeeded by Piotr I (1071–1111). During the episcopate of Piotr I, Count Piotr Włostowic entered upon the work of founding churches and monasteries which has preserved his name. Petrus was followed by: Żyrosław I (1112–20); Heymo (1120–26), who welcomed Otto of Bamberg to Wrocław in May 1124 when the saint was on his missionary journey to Pomerania; Robert I (1127–42), who was Bishop of Kraków; Robert II (1142–46); and Janik (1146–49), who became Archbishop of Gniezno.

With the episcopate of Bishop Walter (1149–69) the history of the diocese of Wrocław begins to grow clearer. Pope Adrian IV, at Walter's request in 1155, took the bishopric under his protection and confirmed to it the territorial possessions of which a list had been submitted to him. Among the rights which the Pope then confirmed was that of jurisdiction over the lands belonging to the castle of Otmuchów, which had been regarded as the patrimony of the diocese from its foundation. In 1163 the sons of the exiled Polish duke Władysław returned from the Empire and, through the intervention of Emperor Frederick Barbarossa, received as an independent duchy the part of Silesia which was included at that date in the see of Wrocław. Bishop Walter built a new, massively constructed cathedral, in which he was buried. Żyrosław II (1170–98) encouraged the founding of the Cistercian monastery of Lubusz by Duke Bolesław I the Tall. In 1180 Żyrosław took part in the national assembly at Łęczyca at which laws for the protection of the Church and its property were promulgated. Jarosław (1198–1201), the oldest son of Duke Bolesław, and Duke of Opole, was the first prince to become Bishop of Wrocław (see prince-bishop).

Cyprian (1201–7) was originally Abbot of the Premonstratensian monastery of St. Vincent near Wrocław, then Bishop of Lubusz, and afterwards Bishop of Wrocław. During Cyprian's episcopate Duke Heinrich I and his wife, St. Hedwig, founded the Cistercian convent at Trzebnica. The episcopate of Bishop Wawrzyniec (1207–32) was marked by his efforts to bring colonies of Germans into the church territories, to effect the cultivation of waste lands. This introduction of German settlers by the bishop was in accordance with the example set by Duke Henry the Bearded and Duchess consort St. Hedwig. The monasteries of the Augustinian Canons, Premonstratensians and Cistercians took an active part in carrying out the schemes of the rulers by placing great numbers of Germans, especially Thuringians and Franconians, on the large estates that had been granted them. One of the most noted bishops of the diocese, Tomasz I (1232–68), continued the work of German colonization with so much energy that even the first Mongol invasion of Poland (1241) made but a temporary break in the process. As German colonization in Silesia increased, the city of Wrocław began to be also known by the Germanized name of Breslau, leading to the diocese also becoming called the Bishopric of Breslau. Tomasz's defence of the rights of the Church involved him in bitter conflicts with Duke Bolesław II the Horned. Tomasz began the construction of the present cathedral, the chancel being the first part erected. St. Hedwig died during his episcopate; and he lived until the process of her canonization was completed, but died before the final solemnity of her elevation to the altars of the Catholic Church. After Tomasz I, Ladislaus, a grandson of Saint Hedwig, and Archbishop of Salzburg, was Administrator of the Diocese of Wrocław until his death in 1270.

He was followed by Tomasz II Zaremba (1270–92), who was involved for years in a violent dispute with Duke Henryk IV Probus as to the prerogatives of the Church in Silesia. In 1287 a reconciliation was effected between them at Regensburg, and in 1288 the duke founded the collegiate church of the Holy Cross at Wrocław. Before his death, on the Eve of St. John in 1290, the duke confirmed the rights of the Church to sovereignty over the territories of Nysa and Otmuchów. Tomasz II consecrated the high altar of the cathedral; he was present at the First Council of Lyon (1274) and in 1279 held a diocesan synod. Jan III Romka (1292–1301), belonged to the Polish party in the cathedral chapter. His maintenance of the prerogatives of the Church brought him, also, into conflict with the temporal rulers of Silesia; in 1296 he called a synod for the defence of these rights.

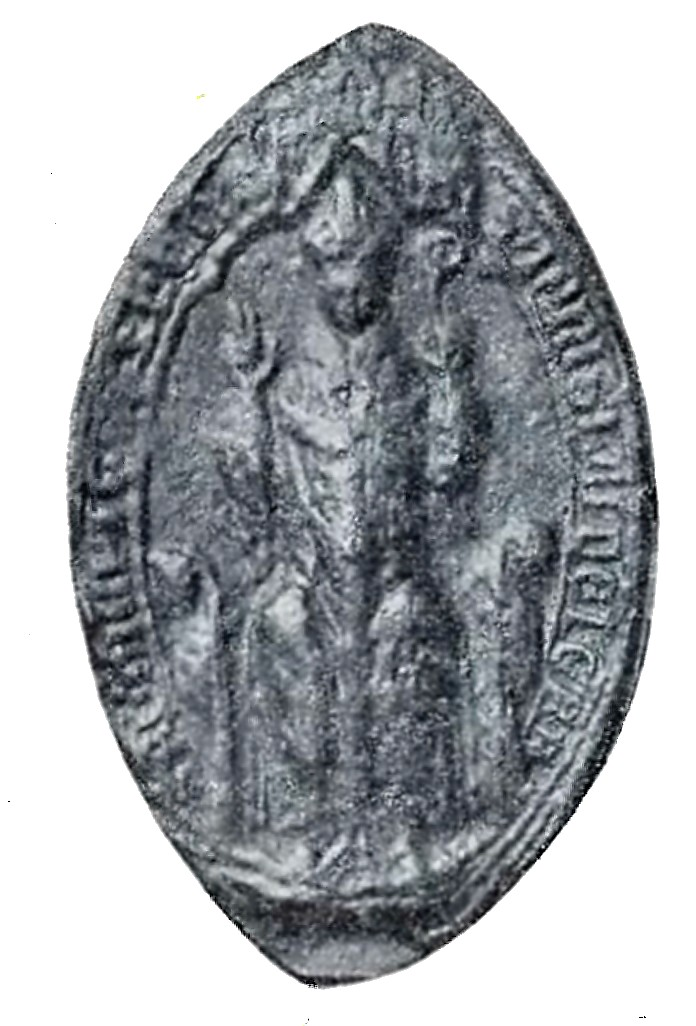
Nanker, 19th Bishop of Wrocław

In the election of Henry of Wierzbna (1302–19), the German party in the cathedral chapter won, but this victory cost the new bishop the enmity of the opposing faction. He was made guardian of the youthful Dukes of Wrocław, and this appointment, together with the factional disputes, led to the bringing of grave accusations against him. The researches of more recent times have proved the groundlessness of these attacks. He was kept in Avignon a number of years by a suit before the Curia which was finally settled in his favour. Notwithstanding the troubles of his life he was energetic in the performance of his duties. He carried on the construction of the cathedral, and in 1305 and 1316 held diocesan synods. The office of Auxiliary Bishop of Wrocław dates from his episcopate. After his death a divided vote led to a vacancy of the see. The two candidates, Wit and Lutold, elected by the opposing factions, finally resigned, and Pope John XXII transferred Nanker of Kraków to Wrocław (1326–41).

=== Within Bohemia and the Habsburg Monarchy ===
The constant division and subdivision of Silesian territory into small principalities for the members of the ruling families resulted in a condition of weakness that resulted in dependence on a stronger neighbour, and parts of Silesia thus came under the control of Bohemia (first between 1289 and 1306; definitely from 1327 onwards), which itself was part of the Holy Roman Empire. A quarrel broke out between Bishop Nanker and the suzerain of Silesia, King John I of Bohemia, when the king seized the castle of Milicz which belonged to the cathedral chapter. The bishop excommunicated the king and those members of the Council of Wrocław who sided with him. On account of this he was obliged to flee from Breslau and take refuge in Nysa, where he died.

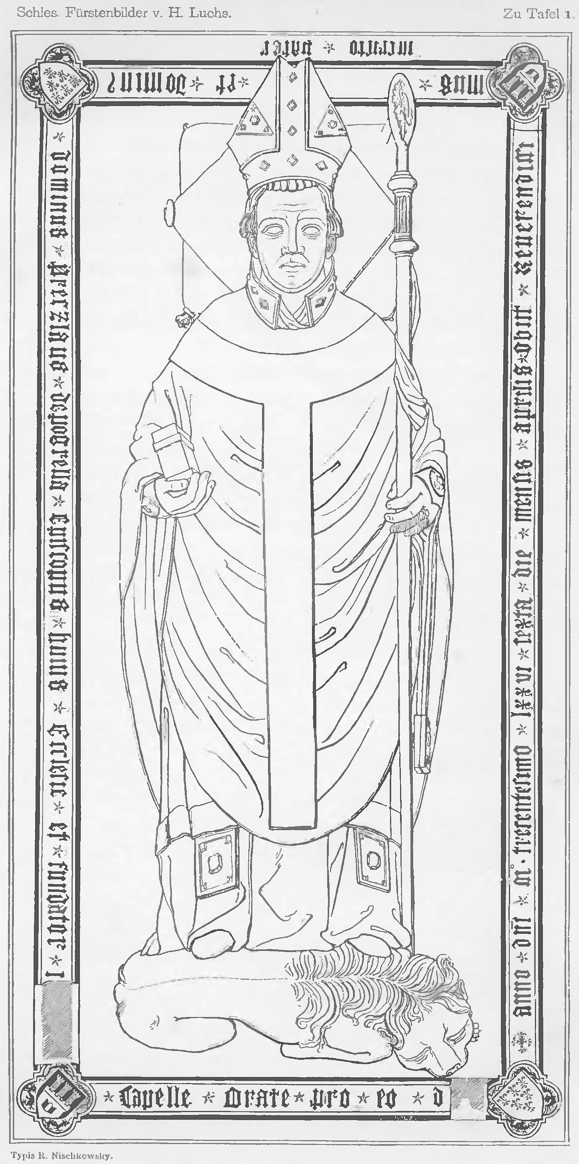
Przecław of Pogorzela, 20th Bishop of Wrocław

Przecław of Pogorzela (1341–1376) was elected bishop while pursuing his studies at Bologna, and was consecrated bishop at Avignon. Through his friendship with Charles, the son of King John, he was soon able to settle the discord that had arisen under his predecessor. The diocese prospered greatly under his rule. He bought the Duchy of Grodków from Duke Bolesław III the Generous and added it to the episcopal territory of Nysa. The Bishops of Wrocław had, therefore, after this the titles of Prince of Nysa and Duke of Grodków, and took precedence over the other Silesian rulers who held principalities in fief.

Emperor Charles IV wished to separate Wrocław from the Archdiocese of Gniezno and to make it a suffragan of the newly erected Archbishopric of Prague (1344) but the plan failed, owing to the opposition of the Archbishop of Gniezno. Przecław added to the cathedral the beautiful Lady Chapel, in which he was buried and where his tomb still exists. Dietrich, dean of the cathedral, who was elected as successor to Przecław, could not obtain the papal confirmation, and the Bishop of Olomouc, who was chosen in his place, soon died. After a long contest with Charles, Bishop Wenceslaus of Lebus, Duke of Legnica, was transferred to Wrocław (1382–1417). The new bishop devoted himself to repairing the damage inflicted on the Church in Silesia by the actions of Charles. He held two synods, in 1410 and 1415, with the object of securing a higher standard of ecclesiastical discipline; and he settled the right of inheritance in the territory under his dominion by promulgating the church decree called "Wenceslaus' law". Resigning his bishopric in 1417, Wenceslaus died in 1419.

The episcopate of Konrad IV the Elder, Duke of Oleśnica, the next bishop (1417–47), was a trying time for Silesia during the Hussite wars. Konrad was placed at the head of the Silesian confederation formed to defend the country against hostile incursions. In 1435 the bishop issued a decree of which the chief intent was to close the prebends in the diocese of Wrocław to "foreigners", and thus prevent the Poles from obtaining these offices. The effort to shut out the Polish element and to loosen the connection with Gniezno was not a momentary one; it continued, and led gradually to a virtual separation from the Polish archdiocese some time before the formal separation took place. The troubles of the times brought the bishop and the diocese into serious pecuniary difficulties, and in 1444 Konrad resigned, but his resignation was not accepted and he resumed his office. In 1446 he held a diocesan synod and died in the following year.

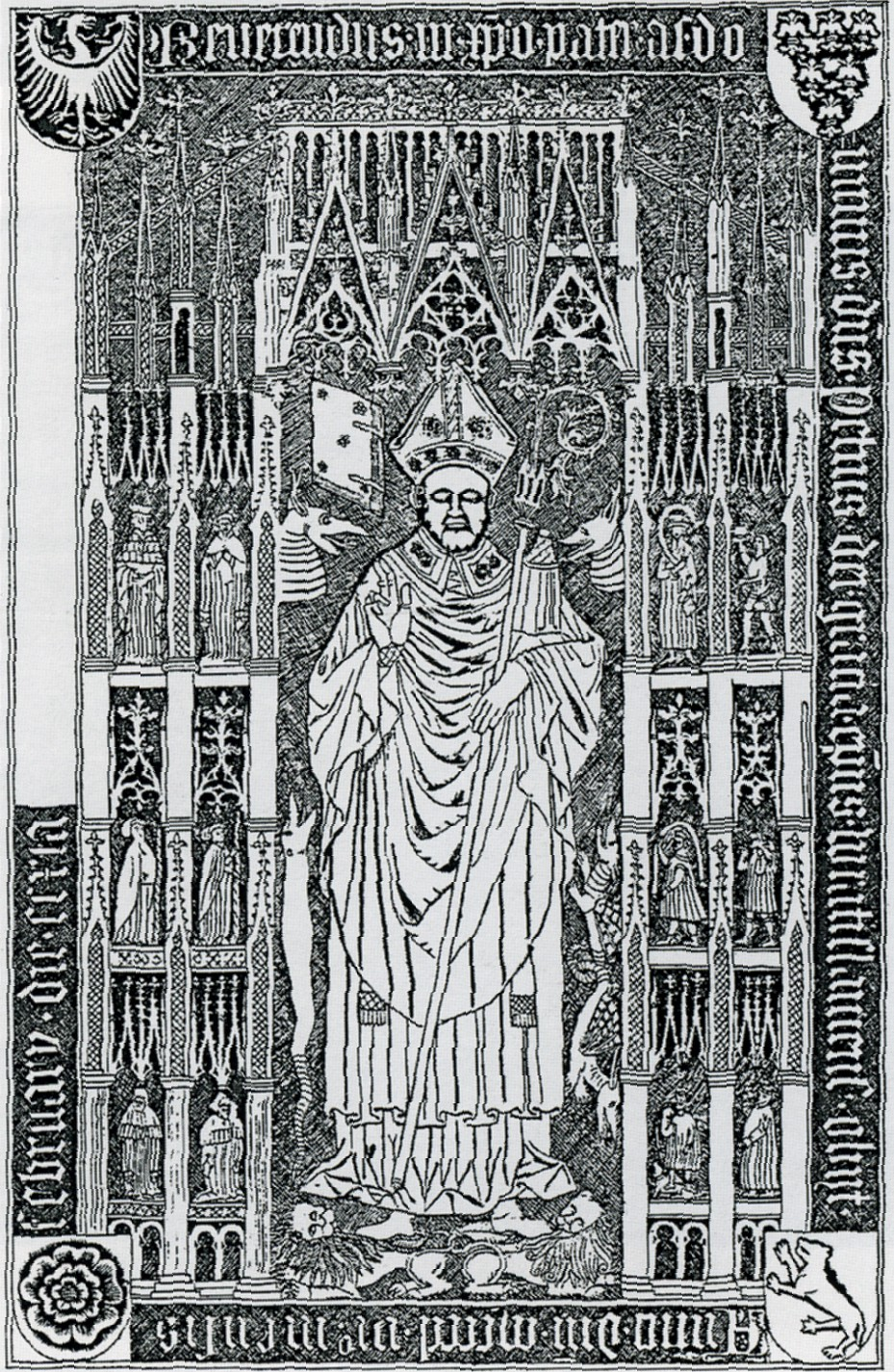
Peter II Nowak, 23rd Bishop of Wrocław

Konrad's successor was the provost of the cathedral of Wrocław, Peter II Nowak (1447–56). By wise economy Bishop Peter succeeded in bringing the diocesan finances into a better condition and in redeeming the greater part of the church lands which his predecessor had been obliged to mortgage. At the diocesan synod of 1454 he endeavoured to suppress the abuses that had arisen in the diocese.

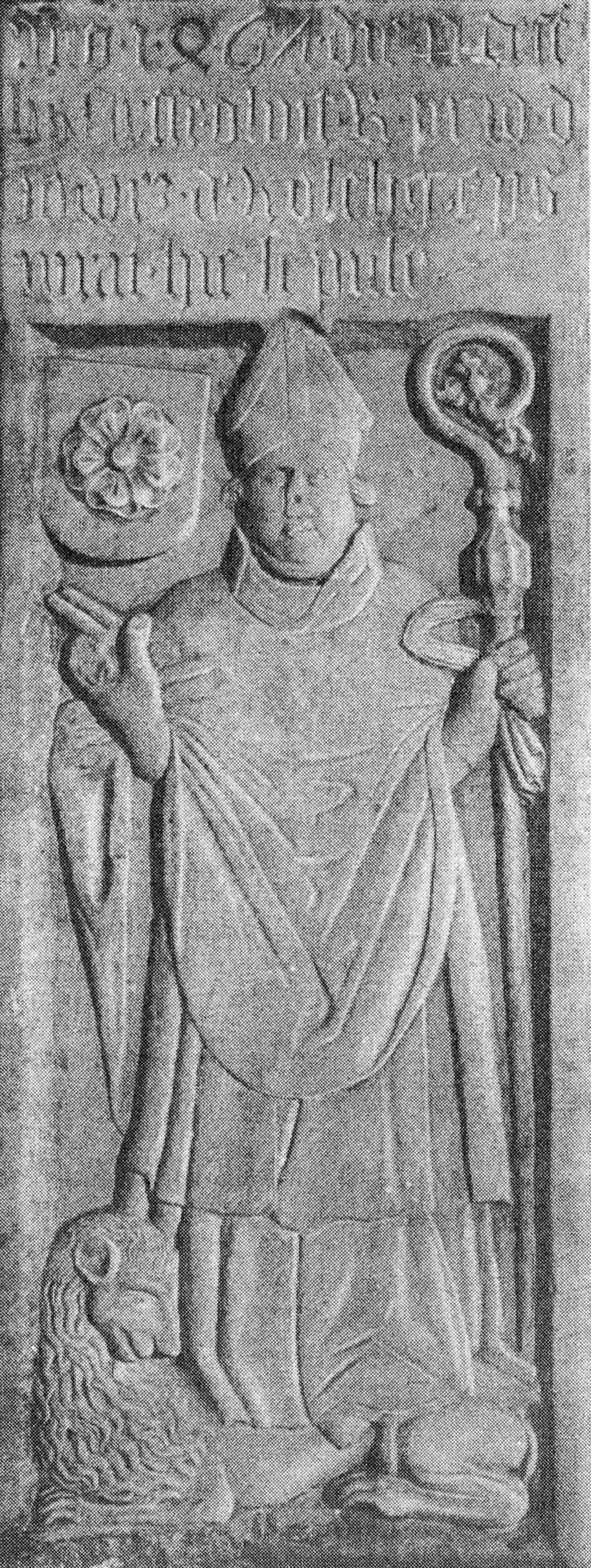
Jošt of Rožmberk, 24th Bishop of Wrocław

Jošt of Rožmberk (1456–67) was a Bohemian nobleman and Grand Prior of the Knights of St. John. His love of peace made his position a very difficult one during the fierce ecclesiastic-political contention that raged between the Hussite King of Bohemia, George of Poděbrady, and the people of Breslau, who had taken sides with the German party. Jodokus was followed by a bishop from the region of the Rhine, Rudolf of Rüdesheim (1468–82). As papal legate, Rudolf had become popular in Breslau through his energetic opposition to George of Podebrady; for this reason the cathedral chapter requested his transfer from the small Diocese of Lavant in Carinthia, after he had confirmed their privileges. From this time these privileges were called "the Rudolfian statutes". Under his leadership the party opposed to Podebrady obtained the victory, and Rudolf proceeded at once to repair the damage which had been occasioned to the Church during this strife; mortgaged church lands were redeemed; in 1473 and 1475 diocesan synods were held, at which the bishop took active measures in regard to church discipline.

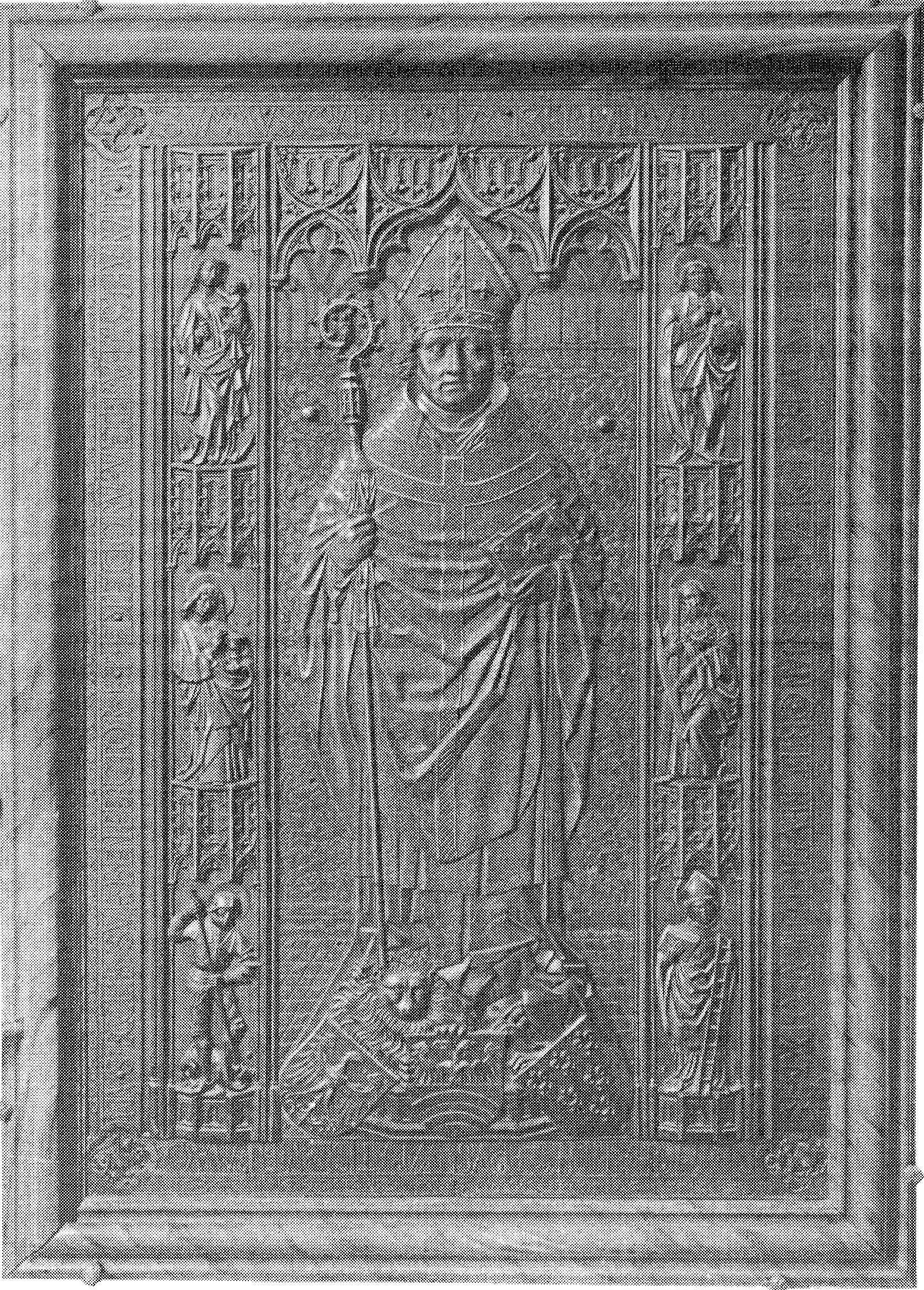
Johann IV Roth, 26th Bishop of Wrocław

As coadjutor, he had selected a Swabian, Johann IV Roth, Bishop of Lavant, a man of humanistic training. Urged by King Matthias Corvinus of Hungary, to whom Silesia was then subject, the cathedral chapter, somewhat unwillingly, chose the coadjutor as bishop (1482–1506). His episcopate was marked by violent quarrels with the cathedral chapter. But at the same time he was a promoter of art and learning, and strict in his conception of church rights and duties. He endeavoured to improve the spiritual life of the diocese by holding a number of synods. Before he died the famous worker in bronze, Peter Vischer of Nuremberg, cast his monument, the most beautiful bishop's tomb in Silesia. His coadjutor with right of succession was John V Thurzó (1506–20), a member of the noble Hungarian family of Thurzó. John V took an active part in the intellectual life of the time and sought at the diocesan synods to promote learning and church discipline, and to improve the schools. On the ruins of the old stronghold of Javorník he built the Jánský Vrch castle, later the summer residence of the Prince-Bishop of Breslau.

The religious disturbances of the 16th century began to be conspicuously apparent during this episcopate, and soon after John's death Protestantism began to spread in Silesia, which belonged to the Habsburg monarchy since 1526. Princes, nobles, and town councils were zealous promoters of the new belief; even in the episcopal principality of Neisse (Nysa)-Grottkau (Grodków) Protestant doctrines found approval and acceptance. The successors of John V were partly responsible for this condition of affairs. Jacob von Salza (1520–39) was personally a stanch adherent of the Church; yet the gentleness of his disposition caused him to shrink from carrying on a war against the powerful religious movement that had arisen. To an even greater degree than Jacob von Salza his successor, Balthasar von Promnitz (1539–63), avoided coming into conflict with Protestantism. He was more friendly in his attitude to the new doctrine than any other Bishop of Breslau. Casper von Logau (1562–74) showed at first greater energy than his predecessor in endeavouring to compose the troubles of his distracted diocese, but later in his episcopate his attitude towards Lutheranism and his slackness in defending church rights gave great offence to those who had remained true to the Faith. These circumstances make the advance of Protestantism easy to understand. At the same time it must be remembered that the bishops, although also secular rulers, had a difficult position in regard to spiritual matters. At the assemblies of the nobles and at the meetings of the diet, the bishops and the deputies of the cathedral chapter were, as a rule, the only Catholics against a large and powerful majority on the side of Protestantism. The Habsburg suzerains, who lived far from Silesia (in Vienna or Prague), and who were constantly preoccupied by the danger of a Turkish invasion, were not in a position to enforce the edicts which they issued for the protection of the Church.

The Silesian clergy had in great measure lost their high concept of the priestly office, although there were honourable exceptions. Among those faithful were the majority of the canons of the cathedral of Breslau; they distinguished themselves not only by their learning, but also by their religious zeal. It was in the main due to them that the diocese did not fall into spiritual ruin. The chapter was the willing assistant of the bishops in the reform of the diocese. Martin of Gerstmann (1574–85) began the renovation of the diocese, and the special means by which he hoped to attain the desired end were: the founding of a seminary for clerics, visitations of the diocese, diocesan synods, and the introduction of the Jesuits.

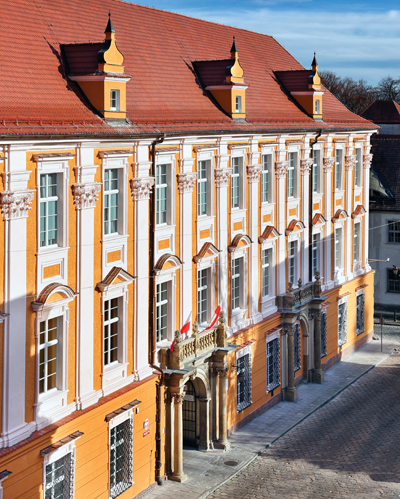
Former episcopal palace in Nysa, now a museum

His successor, Andreas von Jerin (1585–96), a Swabian who had educated at the German College at Rome, followed in his footsteps. At the diocesan synod of 1592 he endeavoured to improve church discipline. Besides his zeal in elevating the life of the Church, he was also a promoter of the arts and learning. The silver altar with which he adorned his cathedral still exists, and he brought the schools in the principality of Neisse into a flourishing condition. The bishop also rendered important services to the emperor, as legate at various times.

Bonaventura Hahn, elected in 1596 as the successor of Andreas von Jerin, was not recognized by the emperor and was obliged to resign his position. The candidate of the emperor, Paul Albert (1599–1600), occupied the see only one year. Johann VI (1600–8), a member of a noble family of Silesia named von Sitsch, took more severe measures than his predecessors against Protestantism, in the hope of checking it, especially in the episcopal principality of Neisse-Grottkau.

Bishop Charles (1608–24), an Archduke of Austria, had greater success than his predecessor after the first period of the Thirty Years' War had taken a turn favourable to Austria and the Catholic party. Charles wanted to move under protection of the Polish–Lithuanian Commonwealth, hoping to avoid participation in the war which was ravaging the Holy Roman Empire. As Charles's bishopric was nominally subordinated to the Polish Archbishopric of Gniezno, he asked the Archbishop of Gniezno for mediation in talks with King Sigismund III Vasa of Poland about protection and subordination of his bishopric. In May 1619, Prince Władysław (the future King Władysław IV Vasa), invited by his uncle Charles, left Warsaw and started a trip to Silesia. During talks with Władysław in mid-1619, the Habsburgs promised to agree to a temporary occupation of part of Silesia by Polish forces, which the unsuccessfully Vasas hoped would later allow the re-incorporation of those areas into Poland.

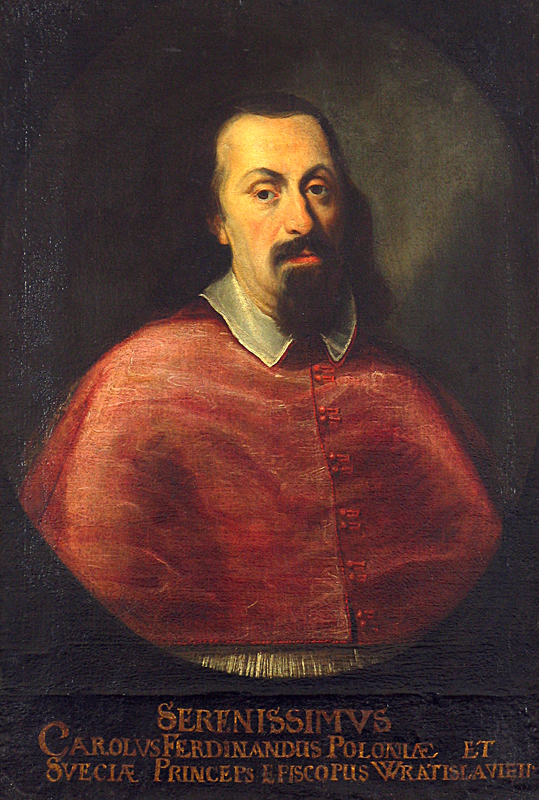
Karol Ferdynand Vasa, 37th Bishop of Wrocław

In July 1619 Czech Protestants rebelled against King Ferdinand II and offered the Bohemian crown to Elector Frederick V of the Palatinate. On 27 September 1619, probably on hearing the news, Władysław and Charles left Silesia in a hurry and on 7 October 1619 arrived in Warsaw. In December 1619, young Władysław's brother, Prince Charles Ferdinand, Duke of Opole, was chosen by Charles as auxiliary bishop of Wrocław, which was confirmed by the Polish episcopate. The Battle of the White Mountain (1620) broke the revolt in Bohemian Crown (i.e. including the opposition of the Protestants of Silesia). The Bishopric of Breslau (Wrocław) returned to the rule of the Archbishopric of Gniezno in 1620, having before been practically independent. Bishop Charles began the restoration of the principality of Neisse (Nysa) to the Catholic faith. The work was completed by his successor, Charles Ferdinand, Prince of Poland (1625–55), who spent most of his time in his own country, but appointed excellent administrators for the diocese, such as the Coadjutor-Bishop Liesch von Hornau, and Archdeacon Gebauer. Imperial commissioners gave back to the Catholic Church those church buildings in the chief places of the principalities which had become the property of the sovereign through the extinction of vassal families. Until 1632 de facto rule was held in Warsaw by King Sigismund III and not by the bishop or archbishop.

According to the terms of the 1648 Treaty of Westphalia, the remaining churches, 693 in number, of such territories were secularized in the years 1653, 1654, and 1668. This led to a complete reorganization of the diocese. The person who effected it was Sebastian of Rostock, a man of humble birth who was vicar-general and administrator of the diocese under the bishops Archduke Leopold Wilhelm (1656–62) and Archduke Charles Joseph (1663–64), neither of whom lived in the territory of Breslau. After Sebastian of Rostock became bishop (1664–71) he carried on the work of reorganization with still greater success than before.

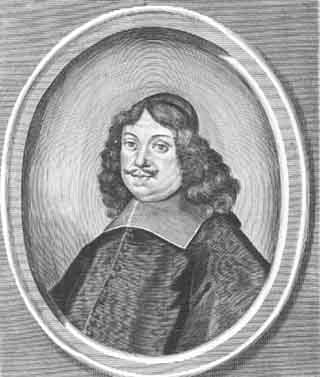
Frederick of Hesse-Darmstadt, 41st Bishop of Wrocław

Frederick of Hesse-Darmstadt, Cardinal and Grand Prior of the Order of St. John, was the next Bishop of Breslau (1671–82). The new bishop was of Protestant origin but had become a Catholic at Rome. Under his administration the rehabilitation of the diocese went on. He beautified the cathedral and elaborated its services. For the red cap and violet almutium of the canons he substituted the red mozzetta. He was buried in a beautiful chapel which he had added to the cathedral in honour of his ancestress, St. Elizabeth of Thuringia.

After his death the chapter presented Carl von Liechtenstein, Bishop of Olomouc, for confirmation. Their choice was opposed by the emperor, whose candidate was the Count Palatine Wolfgang of the ruling family of Pfalz-Neuburg. Count Wolfgang died, and his brother Francis Louis (1683–1732) was made bishop. The new ruler of the diocese was at the same time Bishop of Worms, Grand Master of the Teutonic Order, Provost of Ellwangen and Elector of Trier, and later was made Elector of Mainz. He separated the ecclesiastical administration and that of the civil tribunals, and obtained the definition, in the Pragmatic Sanction of 1699, of the extent of the jurisdiction of the vicariate-general and the consistory. In 1675, upon the death of the last reigning Piast duke, the Silesian Duchy of Legnica-Brzeg-Wołów lapsed to the emperor, and a new secularization of the churches begun. But when King Charles XII of Sweden secured for the Protestants the right to their former possessions in these territories, by the Treaty of Altranstädt, in 1707, the secularization came to an end, and the churches had to be returned. The Habsburg Emperor Joseph I endeavoured to repair the loss of these buildings to the Catholic faith by founding the so-called Josephine vicarships.

=== Within Prussia and the German Empire (main part) and the Bohemian Lands of Austria and Austria-Hungary (lesser part) ===
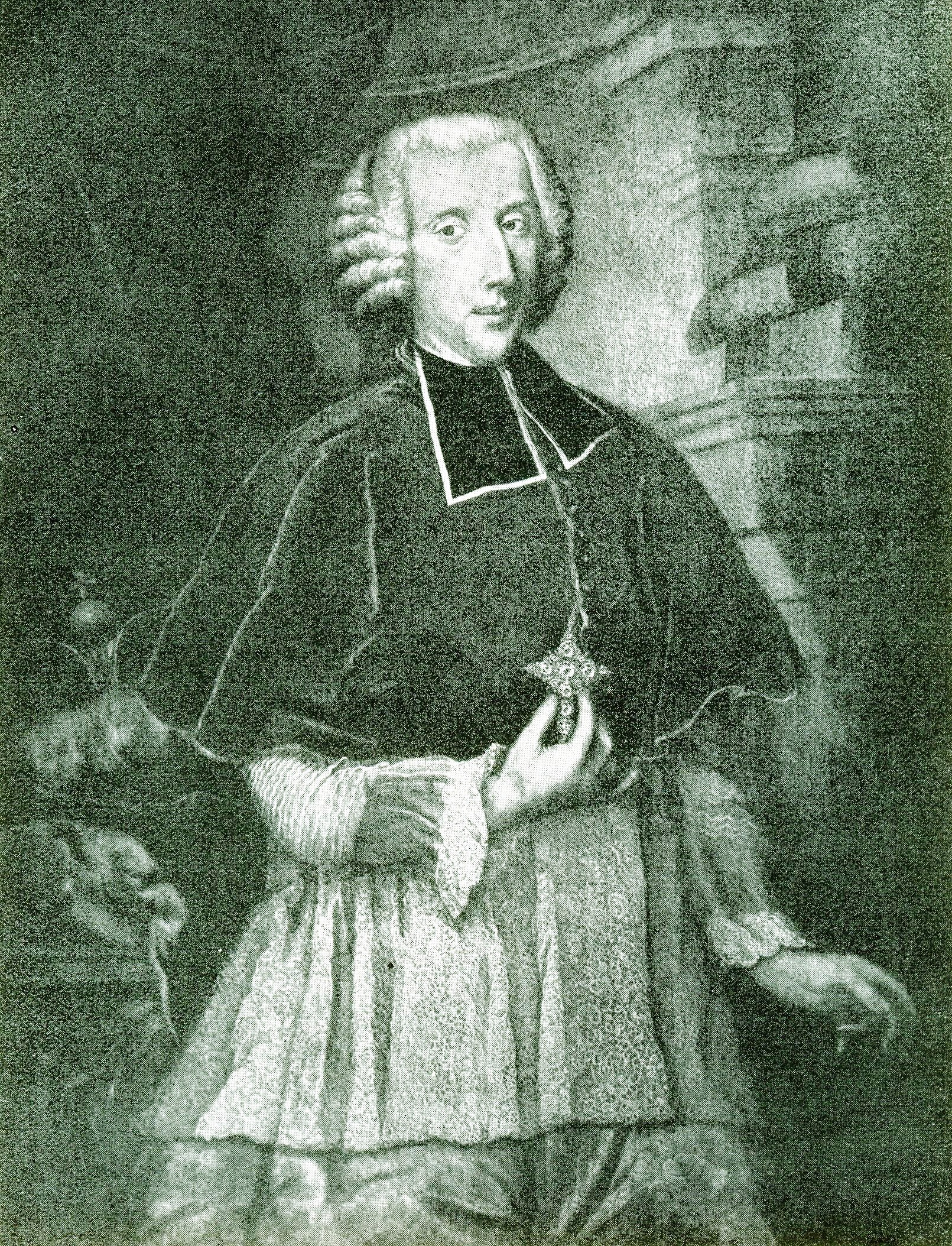
Prince-Bishop Philipp Gotthard von Schaffgotsch, 45th bishop on the see.

The next prince-bishop, Philip, Count von Sinzendorf, Cardinal and Bishop of Győr (1732–1747), owed his elevation to the favour of the emperor. During his episcopate, the greater part of the diocese was annexed by the Kingdom of Prussia during the Silesian Wars. King Frederick II of Prussia desired to erect a "Catholic Vicariate" at Berlin, to be the highest spiritual authority for the Catholics of Prussia. This would have been in reality a separation from Rome, and the project failed through the opposition of the Holy See. Bishop Sinzendorf had neither the acuteness to perceive the inimical intent of the king's scheme, nor sufficient decision of character to withstand it. The king desired to secure a successor to Sinzendorf who would be under royal influence. In utter disregard of the principles of the Church, and heedless of the protests of the cathedral chapter, he presented Count Philipp Gotthard von Schaffgotsch as coadjutor-bishop.

After the death of Cardinal Sinzendorf the king succeeded in the placement of Schaffgotsch as Bishop of Breslau (1748–95). Although the method of his elevation caused the new bishop to be regarded with suspicion by many strict Catholics, he was zealous in the fulfilment of his duties. During the Seven Years' War he fell into discredit with Frederick on account of his firm maintenance of the rights of the Church, and the return of peace did not fully restore him to favour. In 1766 he fled to the Austrian part of his diocese in order to avoid confinement in Oppeln (Opole), which the king had decreed against him. After this Frederick made it impossible for him to rule the Prussian part of his diocese, and until the death of the bishop this territory was ruled by vicars Apostolic.

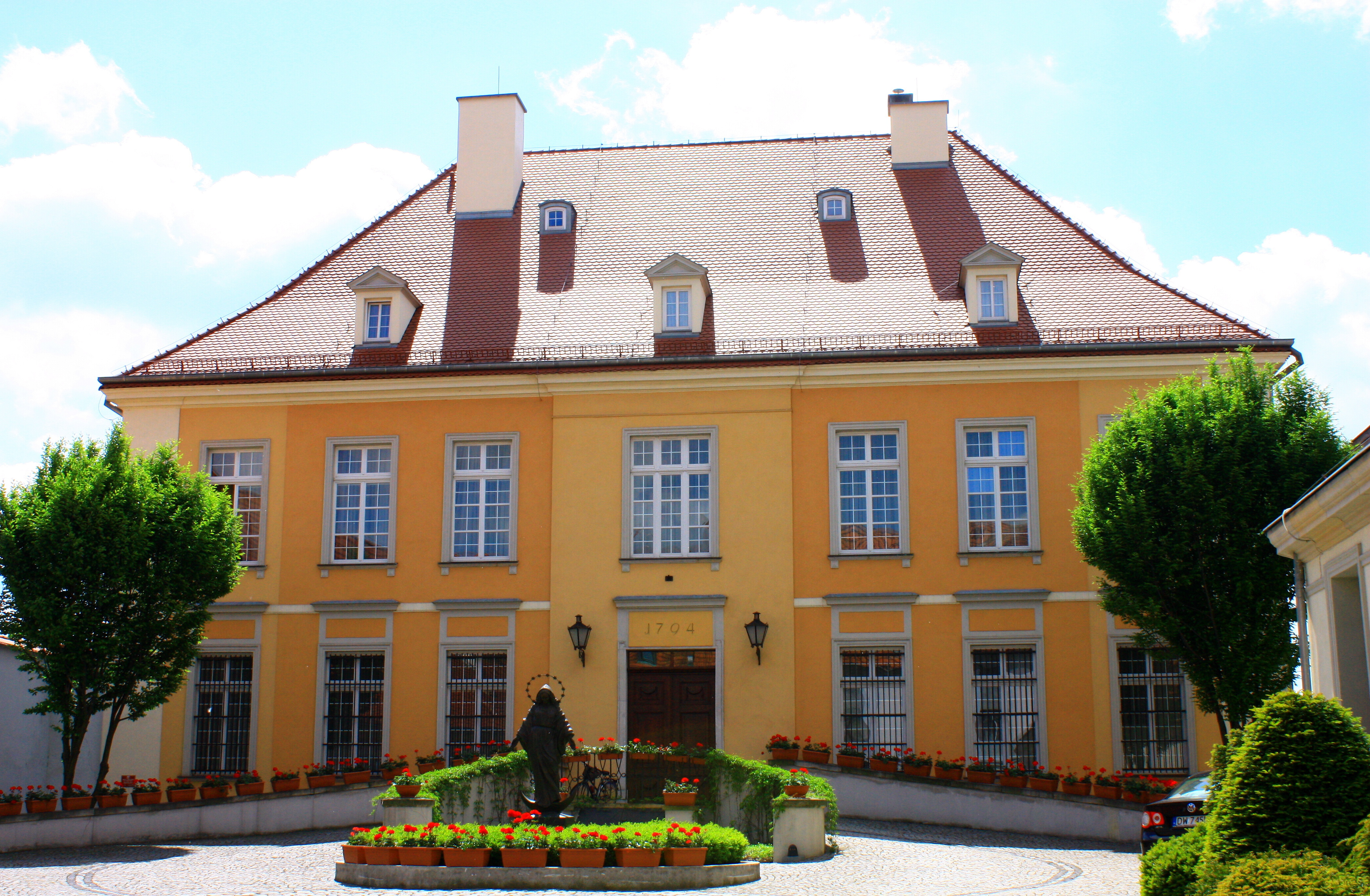
Archbishop's Palace in Wrocław

The former coadjutor of von Schaffgotsch, Joseph Christian, Prince von Hohenlohe-Waldenburg-Bartenstein (1795–1817), succeeded him as bishop. During his episcopate the temporal power of the Bishops of Breslau came to an end through the secularization, in 1810, of the church estates in Prussian Silesia – only the estates in Austrian Silesia remained to the see. The cathedral foundation, eight collegiate foundations, and over eighty monasteries were suppressed, and their property confiscated. Only those monastic institutions which were occupied with teaching or nursing were allowed to exist.

Bishop Joseph Christian was succeeded by his coadjutor, Emmanuel von Schimonsky. The affairs of the Catholic Church in Prussia had been brought into order by the Bull "De salute animarum", issued in 1821. Under its provisions the cathedral chapter elected Schimonsky, who had been administrator of the diocese, as Prince-Bishop of Breslau (1824–1832).

The bull disentangled Breslau diocese from Gniezno ecclesiastical province and made Breslau an exempt bishopric. The bull also reconfined the Breslau diocesan area which from then on remained unchanged until 1922. Breslau diocese then included the bulk of the Catholic parishes in the Prussian Province of Silesia with the exception of Catholic parishes in the districts of Ratibor (Racibórz) and Leobschütz (Głubczyce), which until 1972 belonged to the Archdiocese of Olomouc, and Catholic parishes in the Prusso-Silesian County of Glatz (Kłodzko), which were subject to the Diocese of Hradec Králové within the Archdiocese of Prague until 1972. The Breslau Diocese included the Catholic parishes in the Duchy of Teschen and the Austrian part of the Principality of Neisse. The bull also assigned the Prussian-annexed parts of the Apostolic Prefecture of Meissen in Lower Lusatia (politically part of Prussian Brandenburg since 1815) and eastern Upper Lusatia (to Silesia province as of 1815) to Breslau diocese.

With the exception of the districts of Bütow (Bytów) and Lauenburg (Pommern) (Lębork), until 1922 both part of the Diocese of Culm/Chełmno, the rest of Brandenburg and Pomerania province were, since 1821, supervised by the Prince-Episcopal Delegation for Brandenburg and Pomerania.

Schimonsky retained for himself and his successors the title of prince-bishop, although the episcopal rule in the Principality of Neisse had ended by its secularization. However, the rank of prince-bishop later included the ex officio membership in the Prussian House of Lords (since 1854) and in the Austrian House of Lords (since 1861).

Schimonsky combatted the rationalistic tendencies which were rife among his clergy in regard to celibacy and the use of Latin in the church services and ceremonies. During the episcopate of his predecessor the government had promulgated a law which was a source of much trouble to Schimonsky and his immediate successors; this was that in those places where Catholics were few in number, the parish should be declared extinct and the church buildings given to the newly founded Evangelical Church in Prussia. In spite of the protests of the episcopal authorities, over one hundred church buildings were lost in this way. King Frederick William III of Prussia put an end to this injustice, and sought to make good the injuries inflicted.

For several years after Schimonsky's death the see remained vacant. It was eventually filled by the election, through government influence, of Count Leopold von Sedlnitzky (1836–40). Prince-Bishop von Sedlnitzky was neither clear nor firm in his maintenance of the doctrines of the Church; on the question of mixed marriages, which had become one of great importance, he took an undecided position. At last, upon the demand of Pope Gregory XVI, he resigned his see in 1840. He went afterwards to Berlin, where he was made a privy-councillor, and where he became a Protestant in 1862. In 1871 he died in Berlin and was buried in the Protestant cemetery in Rankau (today's Ręków, a part of Sobótka).

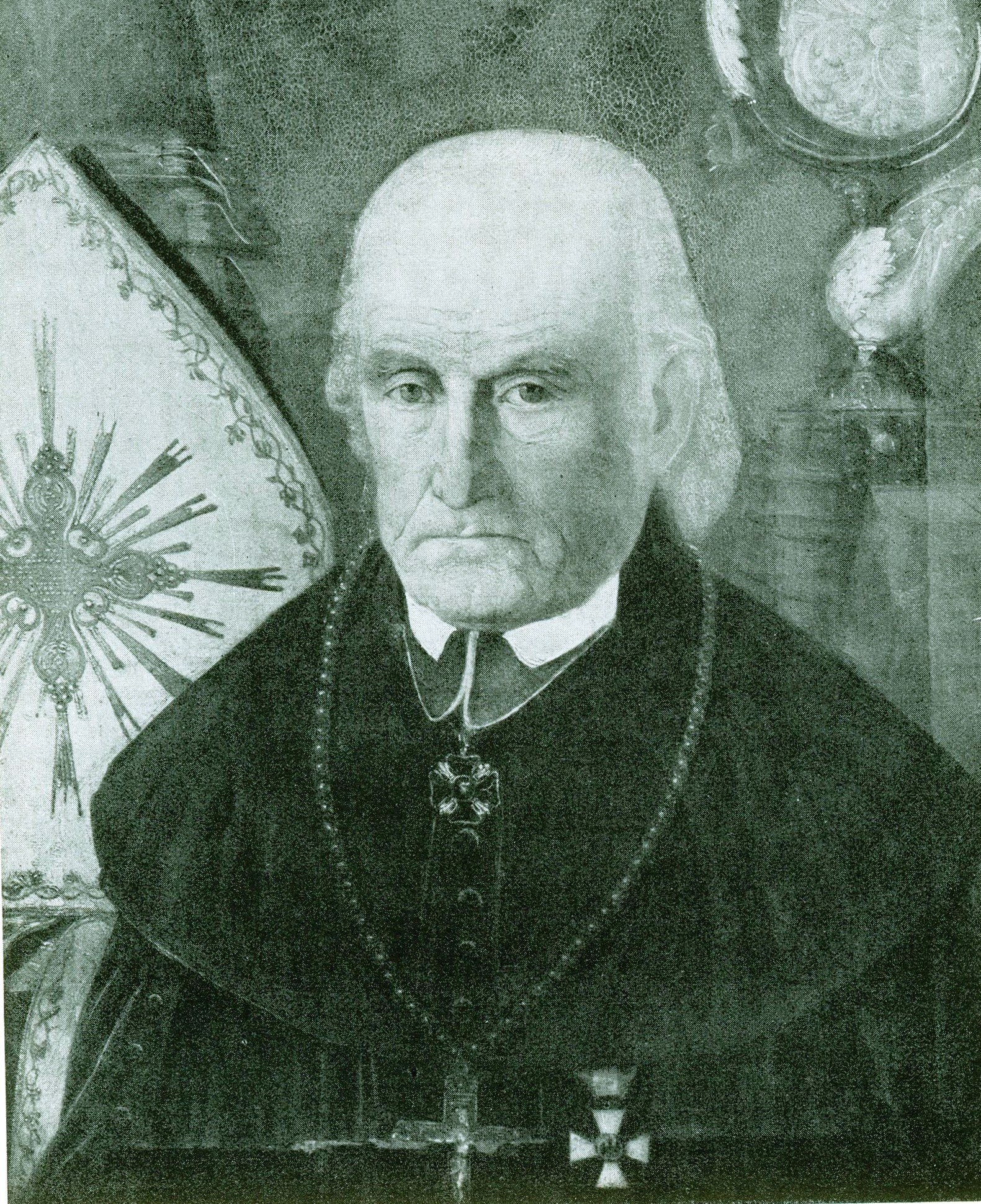
Prince-Bishop Joseph Knauer, 49th bishop of the see

The dean of the cathedral, Dr. Ritter, administered the diocese for several years until the election of Joseph Knauer (1843–44), earlier Grand Dean of the Silesian County of Glatz within the Diocese of Hradec Králové. The new prince-bishop, who was 79 years old, lived only a year after his appointment.

His successor was Melchior, Freiherr von Diepenbrock (1845–53). This episcopate was the beginning of a new religious and ecclesiastical life in the diocese. During the revolutionary period the prince-bishop not only maintained order in his see, which was in a state of ferment, but was also a supporter of the government. He received unusual honours from the king and was made a cardinal by the Pope. He died 20 January 1853, at the Johannisberg (Jánský Vrch) castle and was buried in the Breslau cathedral.

His successor, Heinrich Förster (1853–81), carried on his work and completed it. Prince-Bishop Förster gave generous aid to the founding of churches, monastic institutions, and schools. The strife that arose between the Church and the State brought his labours in the Prussian part of his diocese to an end. He was deposed by the State and was obliged to leave Breslau and retire to the Austrian Silesian castle of Johannisberg where he died, 20 October 1881; he was buried in the cathedral at Breslau.

Pope Leo XIII appointed as his successor in the disordered diocese Robert Herzog (1882–86), who had been Prince-Episcopal Delegate for Brandenburg and Pomerania and provost of St. Hedwig's in Berlin. Prince-Bishop Herzog made every endeavour to bring order out of the confusion into which the quarrel with the State during the immediately preceding years had thrown the affairs of the diocese. His episcopate was but of short duration; he died after a long illness, 26 December 1886.

The Holy See appointed as his successor a man who had done much to allay the strife between Church and State, the Bishop of Fulda, Georg Kopp. He was transferred from Fulda to Breslau and installed 20 October 1887; later created a cardinal (1893).

According to the census of 1 December 1905, the German part of Breslau diocesan area, including the prince-episcopal delegation, comprised 3,342,221 Catholics; 8,737,746 Protestants; and 204,749 Jews. It was the richest German diocese in revenues and offertories. There were actively employed in the diocese 1,632 secular and 121 regular, priests. The cathedral chapter included the two offices of provost and dean, and had 10 regular, and 6 honorary, canons.

The prince-bishopric was divided into 11 commissariates and 99 archipresbyterates, in which there were 992 cures of various kinds (parishes, curacies, and stations), with 935 parish churches and 633 dependent and mother-churches. Besides the theological faculty of the Schlesische Friedrich-Wilhelms-Universität in Breslau, the diocese possessed, as episcopal institutions for the training of the clergy, 5 preparatory seminaries for boys, 1 home (recently much enlarged) for theological students attending the university, and 1 seminary for priests in Breslau. The statistics of the houses of the religious orders in the dioceses were as follows:

- Benedictines, 1 house
- Dominicans, 1
- Franciscans, 8
- Jesuits, 3
- Piarists, 1
- Brothers of Mercy, 8
- Order of St. Camillus of Lellis, 1
- Redemptorists, 1
- Congregation of the Society of the Divine Word, 1
- Alexian Brothers, 1
- Poor Brothers of St. Francis, 2
- Sisters of St. Elizabeth, 6
- Magdalen Sisters, 1
- Ursulines, 6
- Sisters of the Good Shepherd, 4
- Sisters of St. Charles Borromeo, (a) from the mother-house at Trebnitz, 181, (b) from the mother-house at Trier, 5
- Servants of the Sacred Heart of Jesus, 2
- Sisters of Poor Handmaids of Christ, 3
- Sister-Servants of Mary, 27
- German Dominican Sisters of St. Catharine of Siena, 11
- Sisters of St. Francis, 9
- Grey Sisters of St. Elizabeth, 169
- Sisters of St. Hedwig, 9
- Sisters of Mary, 27
- Poor School-Sisters of Notre Dame, 15
- Vincentian Sisters, 7
- Sisters of the Holy Cross, 1
- Sisters of St. Joseph, 1

In the above-mentioned monastic houses for men there were 512 religious; in those for women, 5,208 religious.

=== Within the Weimar Republic, Nazi Germany, Czechoslovakia and the Second Polish Republic ===
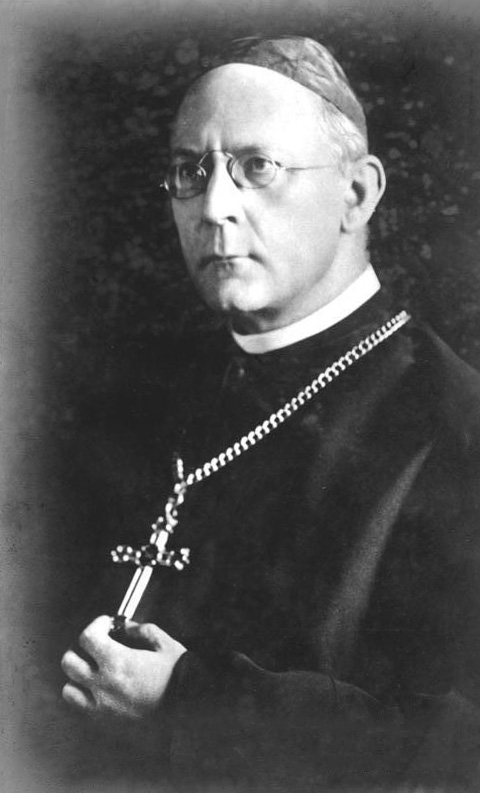
Cardinal Adolf Bertram, elevated to first Archbishop of Breslau in 1930.

After World War I, the Poles and Czechs regained independence, and the Duchy of Teschen, until 1918 politically an Austro-Bohemian fief and ecclesiastically a part of the Breslau diocese, was politically divided into a Czechoslovak western and a Polish eastern part (Cieszyn/Těšín Silesia), even dividing its capital into Czech Těšín and Polish Cieszyn. However, the ecclesiastical affiliation remained unchanged, the Breslau diocese, a cross-border bilateral bishopric since 1742 between – at last – Germany and Austro-Hungary, thus turned into a trilateral Czechoslovak-German-Polish bishopric. Since 1770 the prince-bishop had appointed separate vicars general for the Bohemian (or Austrian, since 1918 partially Czechoslovak and Polish, resp.) part of the diocese. Also the Dioceses of Hradec Králové and of Olomouc comprised cross-border diocesan territories in Czechoslovak Bohemia and smaller parts in German Silesia (Hradec Kr. diocese: Bad Altheide, Glatz, Habelschwerdt and Neurode; Olomouc archdiocese: Branitz, Katscher, Leobschütz and Owschütz). So also the Roman Catholic parishes in Czechoslovak Těšín Silesia remained part of Breslau diocese.

Following the German–Polish Convention regarding Upper Silesia, signed in Geneva on 15 May 1922, also eastern Upper Silesia was transferred from Weimar Germany to the Second Polish Republic on 20 June the same year and formed together with the Polish Cieszyn Silesia part of the new Polish Autonomous Silesian Voivodeship. On 7 November 1922 the Holy See disentangled the Catholic parishes in the new voivodeship from the Breslau diocese and subordinated them to an Apostolic Administrator on 17 December the same year. On 28 October 1925 Pope Pius XI elevated that apostolic administration to the new diocese of Katowice with Bishop August Hlond, then a suffragan of Kraków, by the papal Bull Vixdum Poloniae Unitas.

According to the Prussian Concordat of 1929 the prior exempt Bishopric of Breslau was elevated to the rank of archdiocese in 1930 and was henceforth known as the Archbishopric of Breslau, then supervising the Eastern German Ecclesiastical Province comprising Breslau proper and three suffragans, to wit the new diocese of Berlin, comprising the former Prince-Episcopal Delegation for Brandenburg and Pomerania, the formerly exempt Diocese of Ermland (Warmia), and the new Territorial Prelature of Schneidemühl (Piła).

=== Within Poland (main part), Czechoslovakia and East Germany (lesser parts) ===
After World War II, the city of Breslau became part of Poland under its historic Polish name Wrocław. On 21 June 1945, the Archbishop, Cardinal Adolf Bertram, while staying in the episcopal castle of Jánský Vrch in Czechoslovak Javorník, appointed František Onderek (1888–1962) as vicar general for the Czechoslovak part of the archdiocese. Bertram died on 6 July 1945 in Jánský Vrch castle in Czechoslovakia, supposedly due to the Polish demands upon him (an ethnic German, who, however, had pleaded for German-Polish reconciliation during the time of Piłsudski's rule). Expelled, deported, German ex-Silesians from West Germany have since ca. 1946 entertained claims that Bertram was actually killed or brought near to death by Polish "imperialists" inside the Catholic Church of Poland.

On 16 July 1945 the archdiocesan chapter, still comprising nine members, elected the Polish-speaking Ferdinand Piontek as capitular vicar, whom the Gestapo had banned from Breslau in early February 1945. On his return to the town he was sworn in by the chapter on 23 July. On 12 August 1945 Cardinal August Hlond appeared and demanded Piontek to resign from his office for the archdiocesan territory east of the Oder-Neisse line, claiming to act on the authority of papal mandates, however, only applying to the pre-war territory of Poland.

So Piontek – not knowing of the restricted mandate – resigned for the Polish-held parts of the Archdiocese, but not for the remaining parts in Czechoslovakia and Allied occupied Germany. Hlond divided the Polish-held area of the ecclesiastical province into four apostolic administrations of Gorzów Wielkopolski, Olsztyn, Opole, and Wrocław proper and appointed a diocesan administrator for each of them on 15 August, with effect of 1 September. Capitular Vicar Piontek confirmed Onderek on 18 August 1945 as vicar general for the Czechoslovak part of the archdiocese. Piontek was asked to help Karol Milik, the new administrator in Wrocław, and stayed. He could also take care of the Catholic clergy and laymen of German language, who were in the course of expulsion in accordance to the Potsdam Agreement by the Soviet-installed communist authorities.

Pope Pius XII did not recognise Hlond's overbearances. In order to strengthen Piontek's position Pius XII granted him the rights of a residing bishop on 28 February 1946. However, on 9 July the Polish authorities expelled Piontek and he was stranded in Peine, then British zone of occupation. On 31 July Pius XII confirmed Onderek's appointment and advanced him to Apostolic Administrator of the Czechoslovak part of the Archdiocese of Breslau (the Apostolic Administration of Český Těšín or in Czech: Apoštolská administratura českotěšínská), seated in Český Těšín, thus definitely divesting it from Breslau's jurisdiction. The East German Ecclesiastical Province of Breslau remained in existence de jure; however, de facto this only applied to the archdiocesan territory in the Allied Occupation Zones in the remainder of German post-war territories. This also included big parts of the suffragan diocese of Berlin, except for its areas east of the Oder-Neisse line. However, the territory of the other suffragans and the Territorial Prelature of Schneidemühl/Piła had come under Polish or Soviet rule.

In 1947 Piontek returned to the archdiocesan territory west of the Oder-Neisse line (then part of Soviet occupation zone) and officiated as capitular vicar at the local branch of the archdiocesan ordinariate in Silesian Görlitz, built up since October 1945. Despite the anticlerical Soviet policy he managed to build up a new seminary in Neuzelle in 1948, after the old seminary in Poland was inaccessible for candidates from west of the new border. In 1953 Pius XII invested Piontek with the right to bear a crosier and bestow episcopal blessings. On 23 May 1959 Piontek became titular bishop of Barca.

The Holy See refused to acknowledge Polish Catholic Church claims, however, and only appointed auxiliary bishops to the Archdiocese of Kraków in order to serve the Poles, who remained in Silesia and those who settled in the region. Legally the archdiocese was still considered part of the German Fulda Conference of Catholic Bishops inside Germany of the borders of 31 December 1937. In 1951, the Holy See appointed Teodor Bensch (1903–1958), titular bishop of Tabuda, as auxiliary bishop of Breslau, also responsible for the Polish part of the diocese of Berlin.

=== Within Poland since 1972 ===
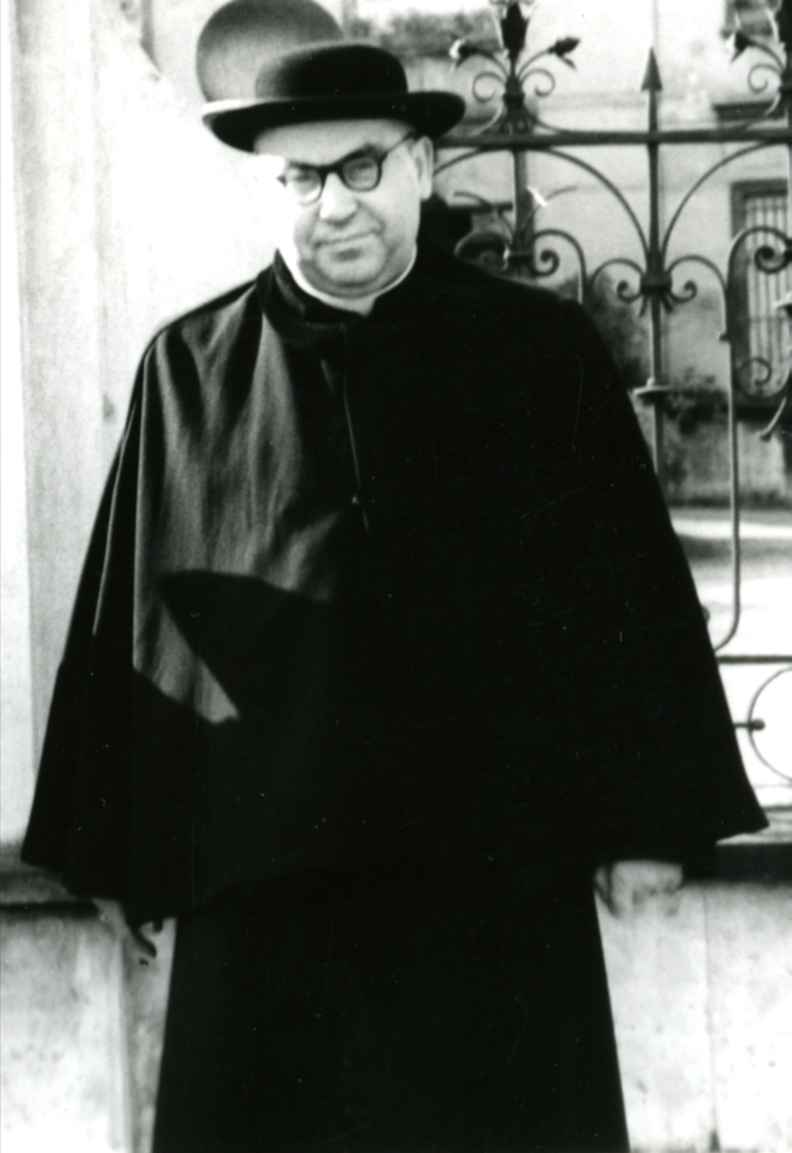
Bolesław Kominek, 2nd Archbishop (first postwar) of Wrocław

On 28 June 1972, however, – in response to West Germany's change in Ostpolitik – Pope Paul VI redrew the archdiocesan boundary along the post-war borders. The Apostolic constitution Vratislaviensis – Berolinensis et aliarum disentangled the East German archdiocesan territory (becoming the exempt new Apostolic Administration of Görlitz), the diocesan district of Gorzów Wielkopolski (becoming the new Diocese of Gorzów) and that of Opole (becoming the new Diocese of Opole). The suffragans Berlin, Piła, and Warmia were also disentangled: the former – reduced to the German territory – becoming exempt; Piła dissolved and allocated between the new dioceses of Gorzów and Koszalin-Kołobrzeg; the Warmia changing as suffragan into the Archdiocese of Warsaw.

The remaining archdiocesan territory, enlarged by the County of Kłodzko area (with Bystrzyca Kłodzka, Kłodzko, Nowa Ruda, and Polanica-Zdrój, heretofore part of Hradec Králové diocese), became the new Archdiocese of Wrocław and a member of the Polish Episcopal Conference. So Bolesław Kominek was appointed to the archiepiscopal see, becoming its first Polish bishop since Leopold Graf Sedlnitzky Choltitz von Odrowąż, a Polish-Austrian nobleman, who had resigned from the see in 1840. In 1978, the Apostolic Administration of the Czech Silesian archdiocesan area was incorporated into the Archdiocese of Olomouc. Since 1996 the area of the former Apostolic Administration forms the bulk of the new Roman Catholic Diocese of Ostrava-Opava, a suffragan of Olomouc.

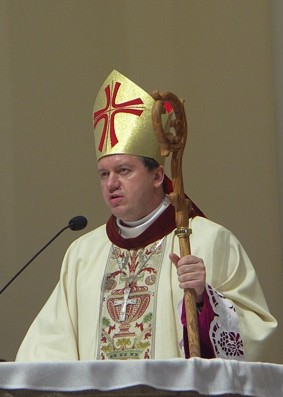
Józef Kupny, 6th and current Archbishop of Wrocław

The expelled German priests and German Silesian laypeople from the now Polish part of the original Archdiocese of Breslau were granted the privilege of an apostolic visitator, given all diocesan jurisdiction required, by Pope Paul VI in 1972, in order to serve the Catholic Heimatvertriebene from Silesia, in West Germany, their new home. The first apostolic visitator was Hubert Thienel, the present and second visitator is Winfried König.

On November 6, 2020, The Holy See's nuncio to Poland announced that following a Vatican investigation regarding sex abuse allegations, prominent Cardinal Henryk Gulbinowicz, the former Archbishop of Wroclaw whose support of the trade union Solidarity played a critical role in the collapse of communism in Poland, was now "barred from any kind of celebration or public meeting and from using his episcopal insignia, and is deprived of the right to a cathedral funeral and burial." Gulbinowicz was also ordered to pay an "appropriate sum" to his alleged victims. On November 16, 2020, 10 days after the Vatican action, Gulbinowicz died, but, as a result of the Vatican disciplinary action, could not have a funeral in Wroclaw's Cathedral of St. John the Baptist or be buried in the cathedral.

== Suffragan dioceses ==
=== Present suffragans ===
- Diocese of Legnica (since 1992)
- Diocese of Świdnica (since 2004)

=== Former suffragans within Wrocław ecclesiastical province ===
- Diocese of Gorzów (1972–1992)
- Diocese of Opole (1972–1992)

=== Former suffragans within the Eastern German ecclesiastical province ===
In 1930 the see was elevated to the rank of archdiocese and three suffragans were subordinated to its jurisdiction, forming together with Breslau's own territory the Eastern German Ecclesiastical Province.

- Diocese of Berlin (1930–1972)
- Diocese of Ermland/Warmia (1930–1972)
- Roman Catholic Territorial Prelature of Schneidemühl/Piła (1930–1972)

== See also ==
- List of bishops of Wrocław
