= Bishop of Wrocław =

Catholic ecclesial title

List of Bishops of the Wrocław Bishopric, Prince-Bishopric (1290–1918), and Archdiocese (since 1930; see Roman Catholic Archdiocese of Wrocław for details).

== Bishops ==
- 1000–? – John (Jan)
- 1051–1062 – Hieronymus
- 1063–1072 – John I
- 1074–1111 – Piotr I
- 1112–1120 – Żyrosław I
- 1120–1126 – Haymo
- 1127–1140 – Robert I I
- 1140–1142 – Robert II
- 1145–1146 – Konrad
- 1146–1149 – Jan
- 1149–1169 – Walter
- 1170–1198 – Siroslaus II
- 1198–1201 – Jarosław, Duke of Opole
- 1201–1207 – Cyprian, (1196–1201 Bishop of Lubusz)
- 1207–1232 – Wawrzyniec
- 1232–1268 – Tomasz I
  - 1268–1270 – Ladislaus of Salzburg, administrator
- 1270–1290 – Tomasz II Zaremba.

== Prince-Bishops ==
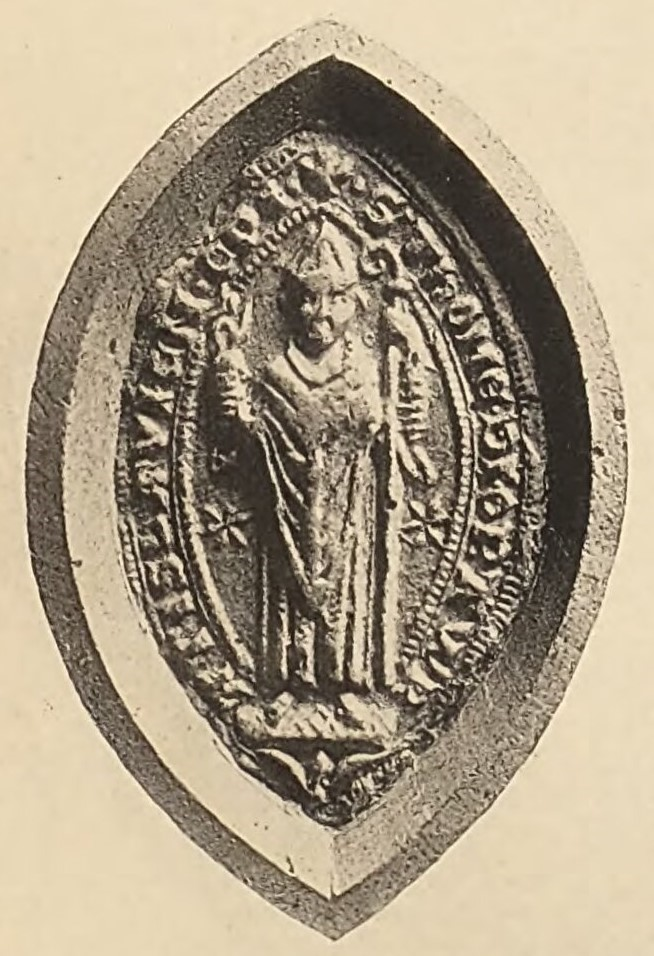
Seal of Tomasz II Zaremba, first Prince-Bishop of Wrocław

- 1290–1292 – Tomasz II Zaremba, granted princely regalia by Henry IV Probus for the episcopal Duchy of Nysa and Castellany of Otmuchów on 23 June 1290
- 1292–1301 – Jan Romka
- 1302–1319 – Henry of Wierzbna
- 1319–1326 – sede vacante after double election:
  - Vitus of Habdank;
  - Lutold of Kroměříž
    - 1319–1326 – Nikolaus of Banz, administrator due to sede vacante
- 1326–1341 – Nanker (Nankier Kołda), bishop of Kraków (1320–1326)
- 1342–1376 – Przecław of Pogorzela
- 1376–1382 – sede vacante due to double election:
  - Dietrich of Klatovy 1376, verified 1378 by Avignon Pope Clemens VII;
  - Johann von Neumarkt (Johannes Noviforensis) 1380, verified by Roman Pope Urban VI, died before taking office
    - 1381–1382 – Wenceslaus I of Legnica, administrator due to sede vacante

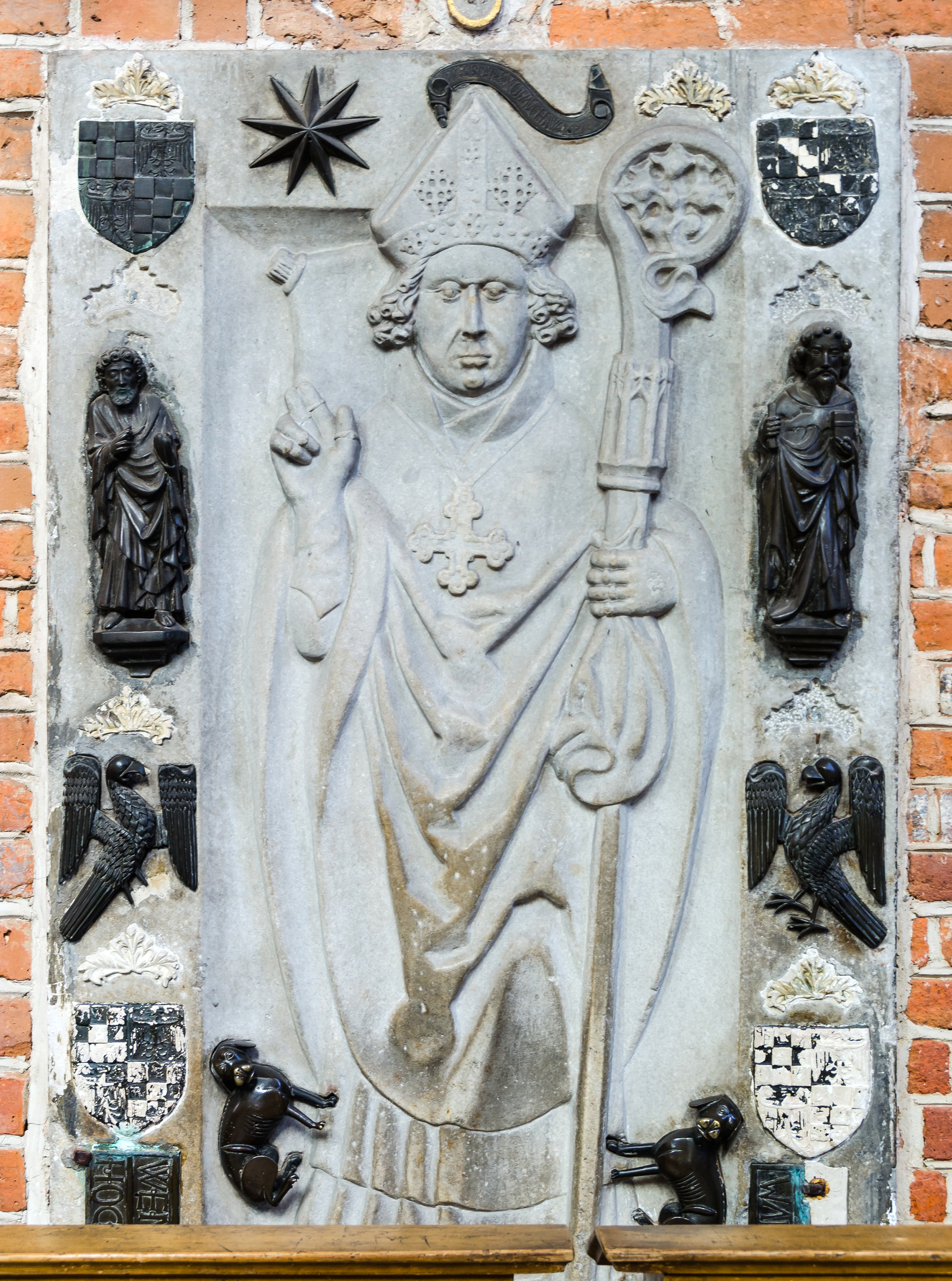
Tombstone of Wenceslaus II of Legnica in Nysa

- 1382–1417 – Wenceslaus II of Legnica, 1417 resignation
- 1417–1447 – Konrad IV the Elder
- 1447–1456 – Peter II Nowak
- 1456–1467 – Jošt of Rožmberk
- 1468–1482 – Rudolf of Rüdesheim
- 1482–1506 – Johann IV Roth
- 1506–1520 – John V Thurzó
- 1520–1539 – Jakob of Salza
- 1539–1562 – Balthasar of Promnitz
- 1562–1574 – Kaspar of Logau
- 1574–1585 – Martin of Gerstmann
- 1585–1596 – Andreas of Jerin
- 1596–1599 – Bonaventura Hahn, 1596 annulled by emperor, 1599 forced to resign by pope
- 1599–1600 – Paul Albert von Radolfzell
- 1600–1608 – Johann VI of Sitsch
- 1608–1624 – Archduke Charles Joseph of Inner Austria
- 1625–1655 – Prince Charles Ferdinand Vasa
  - 1635–1655 – Johann Balthasar Liesch von Hornau, administrator, because Charles Ferdinand Vasa did not reside in Wrocław
- 1656–1662 – Archduke Leopold Wilhelm of Austria
- 1663–1664 – Archduke Charles Joseph of Austria
- 1665–1671 – Sebastian von Rostock
- 1671–1682 – Frederick of Hesse-Darmstadt
- 1682–1683 – Karl von Liechtenstein, resignation by papal order
- 1683 + Wolfgang Georg von Pfalz-Neuburg, had died before election
- 1683–1732 – Count Palatine Francis Louis of Neuburg
- 1732–1747 – Philipp Ludwig von Sinzendorf
- 1748–1795 – Philipp Gotthard von Schaffgotsch, since 1744 coadjutor
  - 1757–1781 – Johann Moritz von Strachwitz, administrator of Prussian part, since 1761 auxiliary bishop
  - 1781–1795 – Anton Ferdinand von Rothkirch und Panthen, administrator of Prussian part, since 1781 Auxiliary bishop
- 1795–1817 – Joseph Christian Franz zu Hohenlohe-Waldenburg-Bartenstein, 1787 coadjutor of Prussian part
- 1817–1824 – sede vacante with Emanuel von Schimonsky as capitular vicar and apostolic administrator
- 1824–1832 – Emanuel von Schimonsky
- 1832–1836 – sede vacante with Leopold von Sedlnitzky as capitular vicar
- 1836–1840 – Leopold von Sedlnitzky, resignation, later convert to Protestantism
- 1840–1843 – sede vacante with Ignaz Ritter as capitular vicar
- 1843–1844 – Joseph Knauer, elect 1841, Grand Dean of the County of Kladsko between 1809–1843
- 1844–1845 – sede vacante with Daniel Latussek as capitular vicar, since 1838 auxiliary bishop
- 1845–1853 – Melchior Freiherr von Diepenbrock, Cardinal
- 1853–1881 – Heinrich Förster
- 1881–1882 – sede vacante with Hermann Gleich as capitular vicar, since 1875 auxiliary bishop
- 1882–1886 – Robert Herzog, Prince-Episcopal Delegate for Brandenburg and Pomerania (1870–1882)
- 1886–1887 – sede vacante Hermann Gleich as capitular vicar
- 1887–1914 – Georg von Kopp, Cardinal
- 1914–1930 – Adolf Bertram, Cardinal since 1916 (public announcement 1919), title of prince-bishop voided in 1918 (but he continued to use the princely title until his death).

== Archbishops ==
- 1930–1945 : Adolf Bertram (d. 6 July 1945), Cardinal since 1916 (public announcement 1919), archbishop since 13 August 1930
- 1945–1972 : sede vacante (see list of administrators, below)
- 1972–1974 – Bolesław Kominek, card., papally appointed as archbishop
- 1974–1976 – sede vacante with Wincenty Urban as capitular vicar
- 1976–2004 – Henryk Gulbinowicz, card.
- 2004–2013 – Marian Gołębiewski
- since 2013 – Józef Kupny

== Post-War Administrators ==
Breslau and most of the archdiocesan territory (like most of Silesia) were annexed to the People's Republic of Poland in July 1945. On 1 September 1945 the archdiocese was de facto divided into four separate areas; Görlitz, Gorzów Wielkopolski, Opole, and Wrocław. In 1972 the Holy See redrew the archdiocesan boundaries, effectively dividing the former Archdiocese of Breslau into four new dioceses.

From 1951-1958, Teodor Bensch served as a spiritual assistant with episcopal jurisdiction for the remaining non-expelled Germans in the Polish part of the archdiocese (residing in Gorzów Wielkopolski). That is, the Germans in Gorzów Wielkopolski, Opole, and Wrocław.

=== Görlitz Vicariate ===
After the division of Germany and Poland, only a small part of the territory of the Diocese of Wrocław became part of East Germany.

- 16 July 1945 - 1963 : Capitular vicar Ferdinand Piontek (bishop-elect until 31 August 1945). He remained undisputedly in office since his election on 16 July 1945, Pope Pius XII granted him on 28 February 1946, when still residing in Wrocław, the rights of a residing bishop. Piontek was expelled from Poland to the British zone of occupation on 9 July, he could return to the archdiocese in March 1947, then taking residence in East German Görlitz.
- 1963–1972 : Capitular Vicar Gerhard Schaffran, also Bishop of Meissen (1970–1987)

In 1972, the vicariate was disentangled from the archdiocese and established as the exempt Apostolic Administration of Görlitz (in 1994 elevated to diocese).

=== Gorzów Wielkopolski Vicariate ===
This Vicariate was also responsible for the Polish-annexed diocesan areas of the archepiscopal suffragans, such as the Diocese of Berlin and the Territorial Prelature of Schneidemühl).

- 1945–1951 : Administrator Edmund Nowicki, appointed for the Gorzów Wielkopolski district with effect of 1 September 1945, deposed and expelled by Communist Polish government on 26 January 1951
- 1951–1952 : Capitular Vicar Tadeusz Załuczkowski
- 1952–1955 : Capitular Vicar Zygmunt Szelążek
- 1956–1958 : Capitular Vicar Teodor Bensch
- 1958 : Capitular Vicar Józef Michalski
- 1958–1972 : Capitular Vicar Wilhelm Pluta, thereafter bishop of the Diocese of Gorzów Wielkopolski newly established from the archdiocese in 1972

In 1972, the vicariate was established as a suffragan of Wrocław as the Diocese of Gorzów Wielkopolski. It was renamed in 1992.

=== Opole Vicariate ===
- 1945–1951 : Administrator Bolesław Kominek, appointed administrator for the Opole district with effect of 1 September 1945, deposed and expelled by Communist Polish government on 26 January 1951
- 1951–1956 : Capitular Vicar Emil Kobierzycki
- 1956–1972 : Franciszek Jop, Special Delegate (for Opole) of Primas Stefan Wyszyński, administrator since 1967, thereafter bishop of the Diocese of Opole newly established from the archdiocese in 1972

In 1972, the vicariate was established as a suffragan of Wrocław as the Diocese of Opole.

=== Wrocław Vicariate ===
This vicariate was also responsible for the Czechoslovak archdiocesan area until 1978.

- 1945–1951 : Administrator Karol Milik, appointed for the Wrocław district by August Hlond on 15 August with effect of 1 September 1945, not recognized as archbishop by the Holy See, deposed and expelled by Communist Polish government on 26 January 1951
- 1951–1956 : Capitular Vicar Kazimierz Lagosz, not recognized as archbishop by the Holy See
- 1956–1972 : Capitular Vicar Bolesław Kominek, not recognized as archbishop by the Holy See, thereafter appointed as archbishop of Wrocław with a sharply belittled archdiocesan area

In 1972, the vicariate resumed its place as the archepiscopal see. Its bishops are listed above.

== Auxiliary bishops ==
- 1251–1260 – Wit
- 1268 – Salwiusz
- 1270 – Herbord
- 1294 – Iwan
- 1302 – Paweł
- 1303 – Mikołaj
- 1303 – Hartung
- 1307–1323 – Paweł
- 1339–1345 – Stefan
- 1346–1365 – Franciszek Rothwitz
- 1352–1378 – Tomasz
- 1355–1370 – Maciej
- 1365–1398 – Dersław
- 1390–1411 – Mikołaj
- 1410–1431 – Tyleman Wessel
- 1405–1435 – Bernard
- 1331–1446 – Jan Panwitz
- 1447–1453 – Bernard
- 1456–1461 – Jan Pelletz
- 1432–1470 – Jan Erler
- 1455–1457 – Franciszek Kuhschmalz
- 1476–1504 – Jan
- 1505–1538 – Heinrich Füllstein
- 1539–1545 – Johann Thiel
- 1577–1605 – Adam Weisskopf
- 1604–1613 – Georg Skultetus
- 1614–1615 – Franz Ursinus
- 1617–1624 – Martin Kolsdorf
- 1625–1661 – Johann Balthasar Liesch von Hornau
- 1640–1646 – Kaspar Karas
- 1662–1693 – Franz Karl Neander
- 1693–1703 – Johann Brunetti
- 1703 – Stefan Antoni Medzewski
- 1704–1706 – Franz Engelbert Barbo
- 1709–1714 – Anton Ignaz Münzer
- 1714–1742 – Elias Daniel Sommerfeld
- 1743–1760 – Franz Dominik
- 1761–1781 – Jan Maurycy Strachwitz
- 1781–1805 – Anton Ferdinand von Rothkirch und Panten
- 1798–1823 – Emanuel von Schimonski
- 1826–1830 – Karl Aulock
- 1831–1835 – Josef Schuberth
- 1838–1857 – Daniel Latussek
- 1857–1860 – Bernard Bogedain
- 1861–1875 – Adrian Włodarski
- 1875–1900 – Hermann Gleich
- 1900–1911 – Heinrich Marx
- 1910–1919 – Karl Augustyn
- 1920–1940 – Walenty Wojciech
- 1923–1929 – Josef Deitmer
- 1940–1946 – Joseph Ferche
- 1957–1974 – Andrzej Wronka
- 1961–1973 – Paweł Latusek
- 1967–1983 – Wincenty Urban
- 1973–1978 – Józef Marek
- 1977–1992 – Tadeusz Rybak
- 1978–1992 – Adam Dyczkowski
- 1985–2000 – Józef Pazdur
- 1988–2004 – Jan Tyrawa
- 1996–2012 – Edward Janiak
- 2006–2021 – Andrzej Siemieniewski
- 2016–present – Jacek Kiciński
- 2022–present – Maciej Małyga

== Apostolic visitators for the expelled German priests and faithful ==
The expelled German priests and German Silesian faithful from the original Archdiocese of Breslau were granted the privilege of an apostolic visitator, given all diocesan jurisdiction required, by Pope Paul VI in 1972, in order to serve the Catholic Heimatvertriebene from Silesia, in West Germany, their new home.

- 1972–1982 – Monsignor Hubert Thienel
- 1982–present – Monsignor Winfried König

== Notes ==
=== Further reading ===
- J. Jungnitz, Die Grabstätten der Breslauer Bischöfe, Breslau 1895
- K. Kastner, Breslauer Bischöfe, Breslau 1929
- P. Nitecki, Biskupi kościoła w Polsce w latach 965–1999. Słownik biograficzny, Warszawa 2000. ISBN 83-211-1311-7
