= Maciej Małyga =

Polish Roman Catholic prelate

The Most Reverend Maciej Małyga
- Titular Bishop of Ulcinium, Auxiliary Bishop of Archdiocese of Wrocław
- Church: Roman Catholic Church
- Appointed: 10 March 2022
- Other post: Vicar General of the Archdiocese of Wrocław (since 2022)

Orders
- Ordination: 22 May 2004 by Marian Gołębiewski
- Consecration: 24 April 2022 by Józef Kupny

Personal details
- Born: Maciej Małyga; 11 May 1979 (age 47) Środa Śląska, Poland
- Education: Major Theological Seminary in Wrocław, University of Freiburg
- Coat of arms

Bishop Maciej Małyga (born 11 May 1979) is a Polish Roman Catholic prelate, who currently serves as the Titular Bishop of Ulcinium and Auxiliary bishop of the Roman Catholic Archdiocese of Wrocław since 10 March 2022.

== Early life and education ==
Małyga was born in Środa Śląska in the Roman Catholic family. After graduation of the primary school education in 1994 and the classical liceum #12 in Wrocław in 1998, he joined Major Theological Seminary in Wrocław, Poland (1998–2004) and was ordained as a priest for the Archdiocese of Wrocław on 22 May 2004 at the Wrocław Cathedral by archbishop Marian Gołębiewski, after completed his philosophical and theological studies.

== Pastoral and educational work ==
In the years 2004–2006 he was an assistant priest in the parish of St. John the Apostle and Evangelist in Oleśnica. During 2006–2012 he continued his postgraduate studies at the University of Freiburg, Germany and in 2012 he obtained a Doctor of Theology degree and began lecturing at the Pontifical Faculty of Theology in Wrocław.

After returning from studies, he became a spiritual director at the Major Theological Seminary in Wrocław. In 2019 he became the bishop's vicar for the permanent formation of priests. He was also elected to the Priestly Council and appointed director of the House of Permanent Formation of Priests in Sulistrowiczki. In 2021, he became a spiricual director for the propaedeutic year in the Archdiocese of Wrocław.

== Prelate ==
On 10 March 2022 Fr. Małyga was appointed by Pope Francis as an auxiliary bishop of the Roman Catholic Archdiocese of Wrocław and Titular Bishop of Ulcinium. On 24 April 2022 he was consecrated as bishop by Archbishop Józef Kupny and other prelates of the Roman Catholic Church in the Cathedral of St. John the Baptist in Wrocław.

Bishop Małyga was appointed as a vicar general of the Archdiocese of Wrocław.

Catholic Church titles
Preceded by Józef Pazdur	Titular Bishop of Ulcinium; 2022–	Incumbent
