= Jošt of Rožmberk =

Bohemian nobleman and bishop (1430–1467)

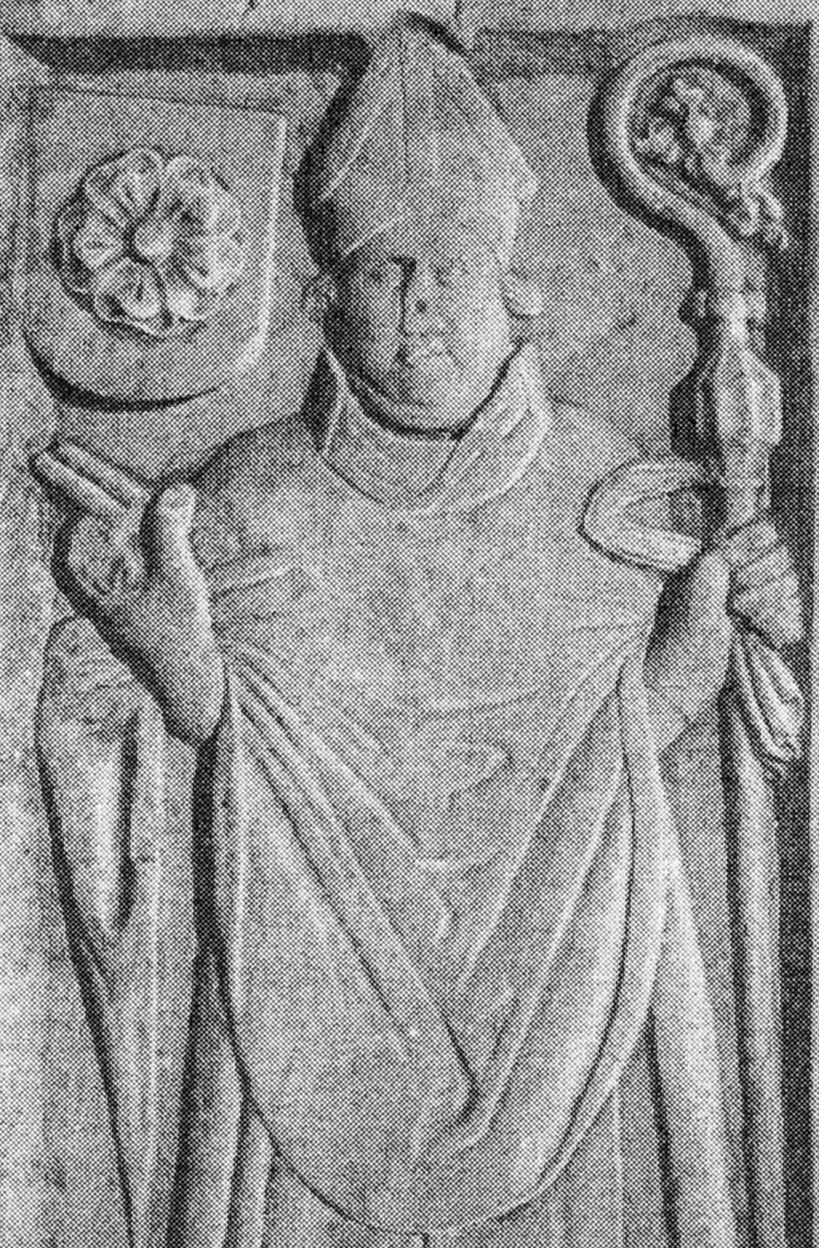
- Born: 11 November 1430
- Died: 12 December 1467 (aged 37); Nysa
- Buried: Wrocław Cathedral
- Noble family: House of Rosenberg
- Father: Ulrich II of Rosenberg
- Mother: Catherine of Wartenberg

Jošt of Rožmberk (Polish: Jodok z Rożemberka, Czech: Jošt II. z Rožmberka, German: Jost II. von Rosenberg; 11 November 1430 – 12 December 1467 in Nysa) was a Bohemian nobleman. He was Bishop of Wrocław and Grand Prior of the Order of St. John for Austria and Bohemia.

== Life ==
Jošt was a member of the south Bohemian noble Rosenberg family. His parents were Ulrich II of Rosenberg and Catherine of Wartenberg. After studying in Prague, he joined the Order of St. John; in 1451, he was documented as its Grand Prior. Already in 1450, he had achieved the dignity of provost in the St. Vitus Cathedral in Prague. On 24 August 1453, he was ordained as priest in Salzburg.

After the death of Bishop Peter II of Wrocław in 1456, the cathedral chapter elected him as their new bishop, on the recommendation of King Ladislaus the Posthumous. The fact that his older brother Henry was governor of Upper Silesia, may have played a rôle in his election. At the same time, the chapter passed a statute limiting the power of future bishops. His election was confirmed by Pope Calixtus III on 9 June 1456. The Pope also granted him dispensation, as he had not yet reached the age of 30, the minimum age to become bishop under canon law.

After the death of King Ladislaus in 1457, George of Poděbrady was one of the candidates to succeed him. Many people in Silesia, especially the clergy in Wrocław, opposed him. Jošt's brother John was a supporter of George's candidacy; Jošt himself tried to remain neutral and represent the interests of the Holy See. He nevertheless got into a difficult position when he tried to take the interests of the Bohemian King into consideration during his negotiations with the Vatican and the council of Wrocław.

In 1458, George of Poděbrady was elected King of Bohemia. Mamy people in Bohemia preferred him over the other candidates, who were all foreigners. However, the citizens of Wrocław refused to recognize him as King. After lengthy negotiations, Pope Pius II intervened via Jošt, who was his representative Silesia. Only in December 1459 did the city finally recognize George as King.

In 1461, he delivered a sermon with the title About the blood of God. This sermon angered the citizens of Prague and he had to seek refuge in the King's Hory castle. His relationship with the King worsened in 1462, however, he was still able to mediate between the Roman Curia and the discontented utraquist nobility, who were more and more turning away from Rome. In an attempt to prevent renewed fighting, Jošt tried to convert King George back to Catholicism and he also tried to win Queen Joanna for his position. In 1467, he urged his brother John, who had become governor of Sileasia in 1457, after their eldest brother Henry had died, to switch to the Catholic Alliance again. In the same year, Jošt founded an anti-Hussite league. However, Rudolf of Rüdesheim, who was Bishop of Lavant and also the papal legate in Wrocław, and later Jošt's successor as bishop, soon gained control of this league.

Jošt divided his time between Wrocław, Nysa, the seat of his bishopric, Strakonice, the seat of his Grand Priory of the Order of St. John, and Český Krumlov, the family seat of the House of Rosenberg. He was responsible for the addition of the western vestibule to Wrocław Cathedral.

He died in his episcopal residence in Nysa in 1467, at the age or 37 and was buried in Wrocław Cathedral. He was succeeded as Bishop of Wrocław by Rudolf of Rüdesheim.

== Footnotes ==
Jošt of Rožmberk House of Rosenberg Born: 11 November 1430 Died: 12 December 1467
| Preceded by Peter II Nowak | Bishop of Wrocław; 1456–1467 | Succeeded by Rudolf of Rüdesheim |
