= Philipp Ludwig von Sinzendorf =

Austrian Catholic cardinal (1699–1747)

- Cardinal-Priest of Santa Maria sopra Minerva
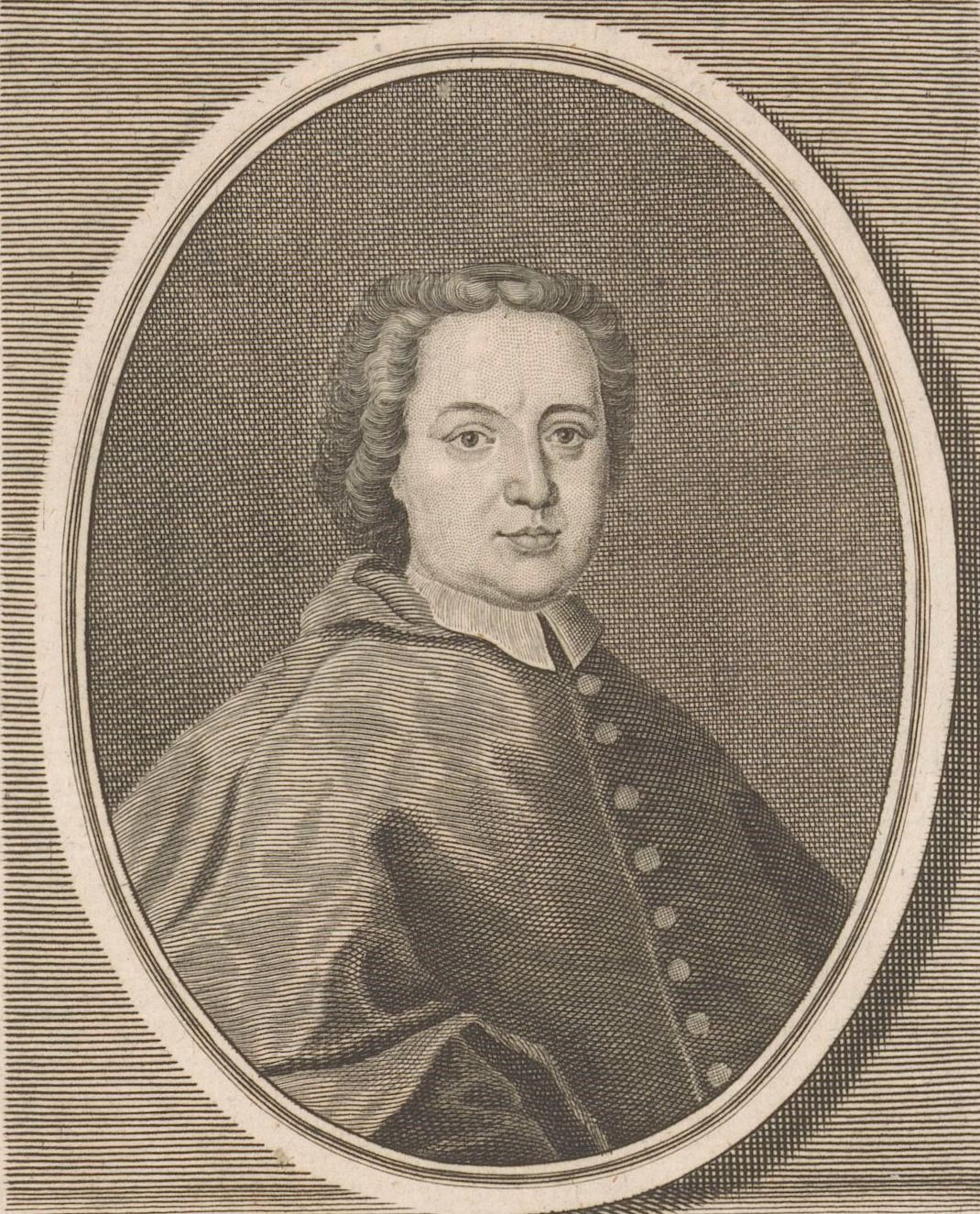
- Church: Catholic Church
- See: Santa Maria sopra Minerva
- In office: 14 August 1730 – 287 September 1747
- Predecessor: Agostino Pipia
- Successor: Daniele Dolfin
- Other post: Prince-Bishop of Wrocław (1732-1747)
- Previous post: Bishop of Győr (1726-1732)

Orders
- Ordination: 1722
- Consecration: 17 November 1726 by Girolamo Grimaldi
- Created cardinal: 26 November 1727 by Pope Benedict XIII

Personal details
- Born: 14 July 1699 Paris, Kingdom of France
- Died: 28 September 1747 (aged 48) Breslau, Kingdom of Prussia, Holy Roman Empire
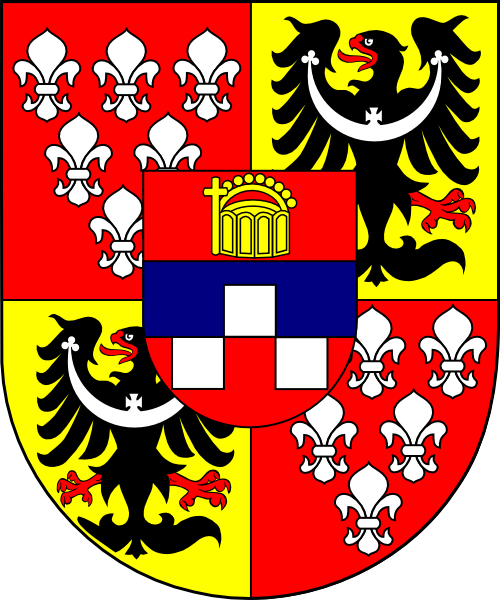
- Coat of arms

Philipp Ludwig von Sinzendorf (14 July 1699 – 28 September 1747) was an Austrian cardinal of the Catholic Church.

He was born in Paris, France as the son of Philipp Ludwig Wenzel von Sinzendorf, who was Austrian Ambassador there. The House of Von Sinzendorf was a member of the Upper Austrian nobility. (It became extinct with Prince Prosper of Sinzendorff in 1822. The family castle at Ernstbrunn, Austria, was inherited by the House of Reuss).

Philipp Ludwig was bishop of Györ in Hungary from 1726 to 1732; after that, he was Prince-Bishop of Breslau (1732 – 1747; until 1742 completely part of Austria, later mostly part of Prussia).

He was made a cardinal in November 1727 by Pope Benedict XIII and was Cardinal-Priest of Santa Maria sopra Minerva from 1730 to 1747.

He died in Breslau.
