= Przecław of Pogorzela =

Polish cardinal (1310–1376)

- Bishop of Wrocław
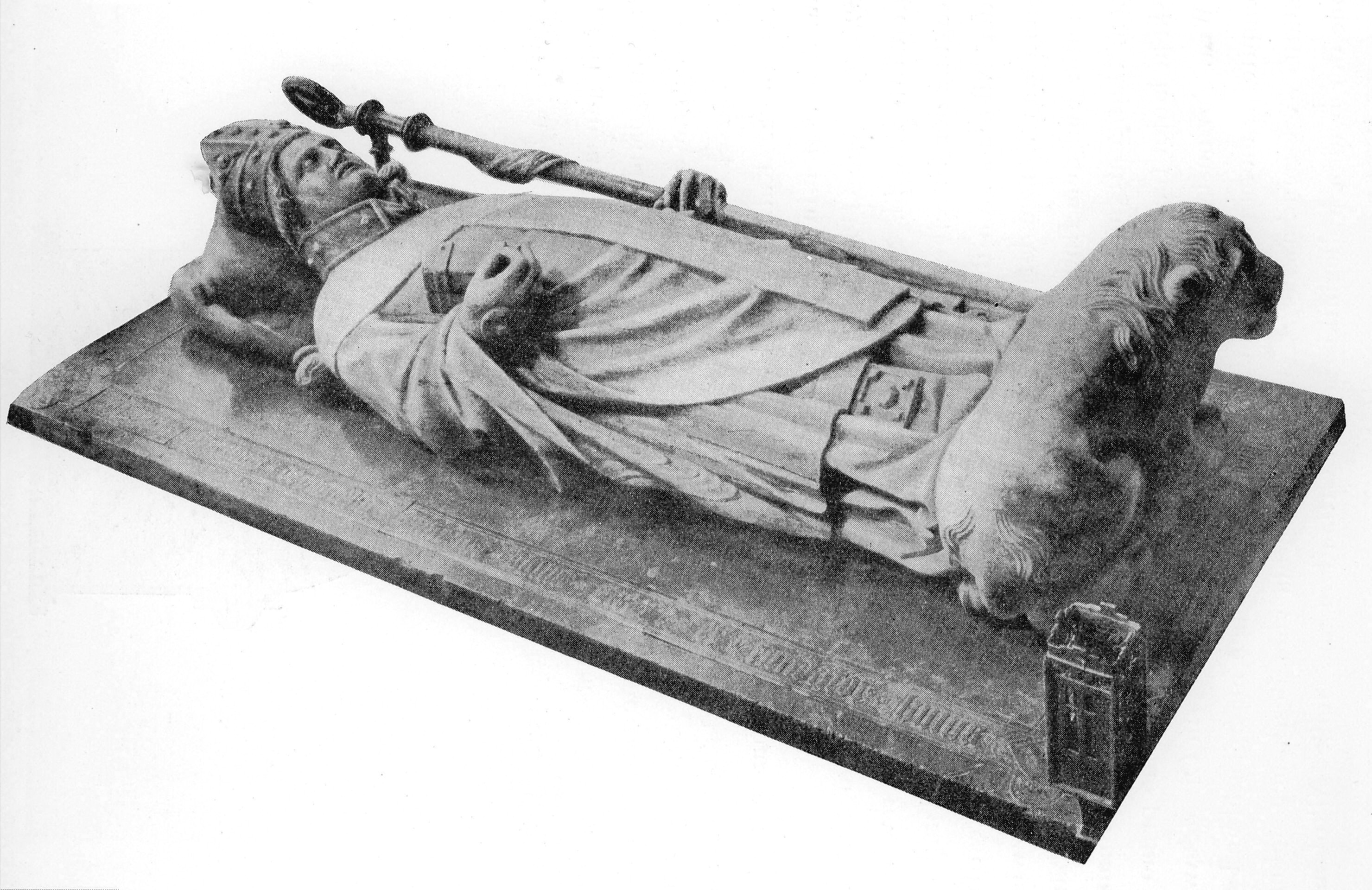
- Tomb of Bishop Przecław of Pogorzela
- Native name: Przecław z Pogorzeli
- Church: Roman Catholic
- Diocese: Diocese of Wrocław
- Appointed: 5 May 1341
- In office: 1342–1376
- Predecessor: Nanker
- Successor: Wenceslaus II of Legnica

Personal details
- Born: 5 March 1310
- Died: 6 April 1376 (aged 66); Otmuchów
- Buried: Wrocław Cathedral

Przecław of Pogorzela (Polish: Przecław z Pogorzeli; 5 March 1310 – 6 April 1376 in Otmuchów) was a Cardinal of the Roman Catholic Church and Bishop of Wrocław and Duke of Nysa from 1342–1376.

Przecław of Pogorzela was born in 1310 into a noble family in the Duchy of Brześc. By April 1329 he was Canon of Wrocław. In 1336 he visited Bologna to study. On 5 May 1341, he was elected Bishop of Wrocław, but due to the opposition of the Archbishop of Gniezno, Janisław, he had to personally go to Avignon for Papal approval, which was confirmed on 28 January 1342.

A tireless builder, he oversaw the completion of Wroclaw Cathedral, built the Church of St. Stanislaus and Dorothy, the chapel of St. Mary's Church and Joseph's Hospital in Nysa. He also founded Carmelite, Carthusian, Augustinian and Benedictine monasteries. He introduced the feast of St. Jadwiga and also had audiences with Emperor Charles IV of Luxembourg and King Casimir III the Great. In 1348, he purchased the castle of Jánský vrch from Bolko II of Świdnica, and turned it into the palace of the prince-bishops of Wrocław.

He died on the night of 5-6 April 1376 in Otmuchów, and was buried in the chapel of St. Mary's Church, Wrocław Cathedral, in a marble sarcophagus. His time has been considered a "golden age" of the bishopric of Wrocław.

== Footnotes ==
Religious titles
Preceded by Henryk z Wierzbnej	Bishop of Wrocław; 1342–1376	Succeeded by Wenceslaus II of Legnica
