= Żyrosław I =

Polish bishop

Żyrosław I (Latin: Siroslaus) was Bishop of Wrocław from 1112 to 1120.

Little is known about his origins, career or his Episcopal work, however, he was the first local Silesian Bishop of Wrocław. His predecessors, known only by name, appear to have been from the area of the Holy Roman Empire.

His tenure saw the foundation of the monastery in Głogów, the Augustinian monastery in Gorkau near Zobten, the Benedictine monastery on the Elblag, as well as Cistercians in Rauden, Magdalene gutters in Nowogrodziec, and Franciscans in Lwówek Śląski.

He died in 1120.

Religious titles
| Preceded by Piotr I | Bishop of Wrocław; 1112–1120 | Succeeded by Haymo |
