= Marian Gołębiewski =

Polish Catholic archbishop (1937–2024)

His Excellency Marian Gołębiewski
- Archbishop Emeritus of Wrocław
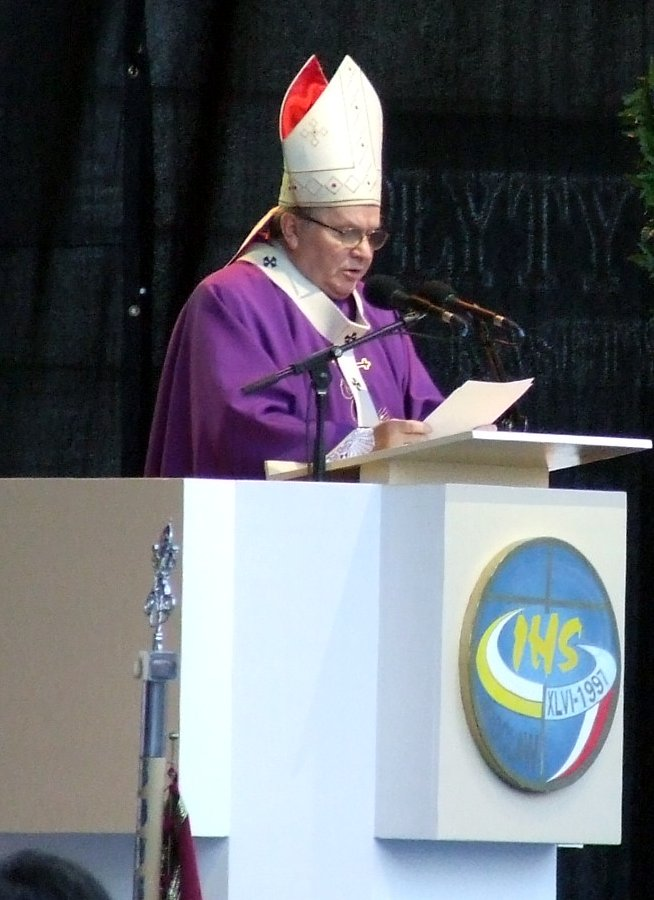
- Church: Roman Catholic
- Archdiocese: Wrocław
- See: Wrocław
- Appointed: 3 April 2004
- Installed: 24 April 2004
- Term ended: 18 May 2013
- Predecessor: Henryk Gulbinowicz
- Successor: Józef Kupny
- Previous post: Bishop of Koszalin-Kołobrzeg (1996–2004)

Orders
- Ordination: 24 June 1962 by Antoni Pawłowski
- Consecration: 31 August 1996 by Józef Kowalczyk

Personal details
- Born: 22 September 1937 Trzebuchów, Poland
- Died: 11 March 2024 (aged 86) Wrocław, Poland
- Denomination: Roman Catholic
- Motto: AD IMAGINEM TUAM
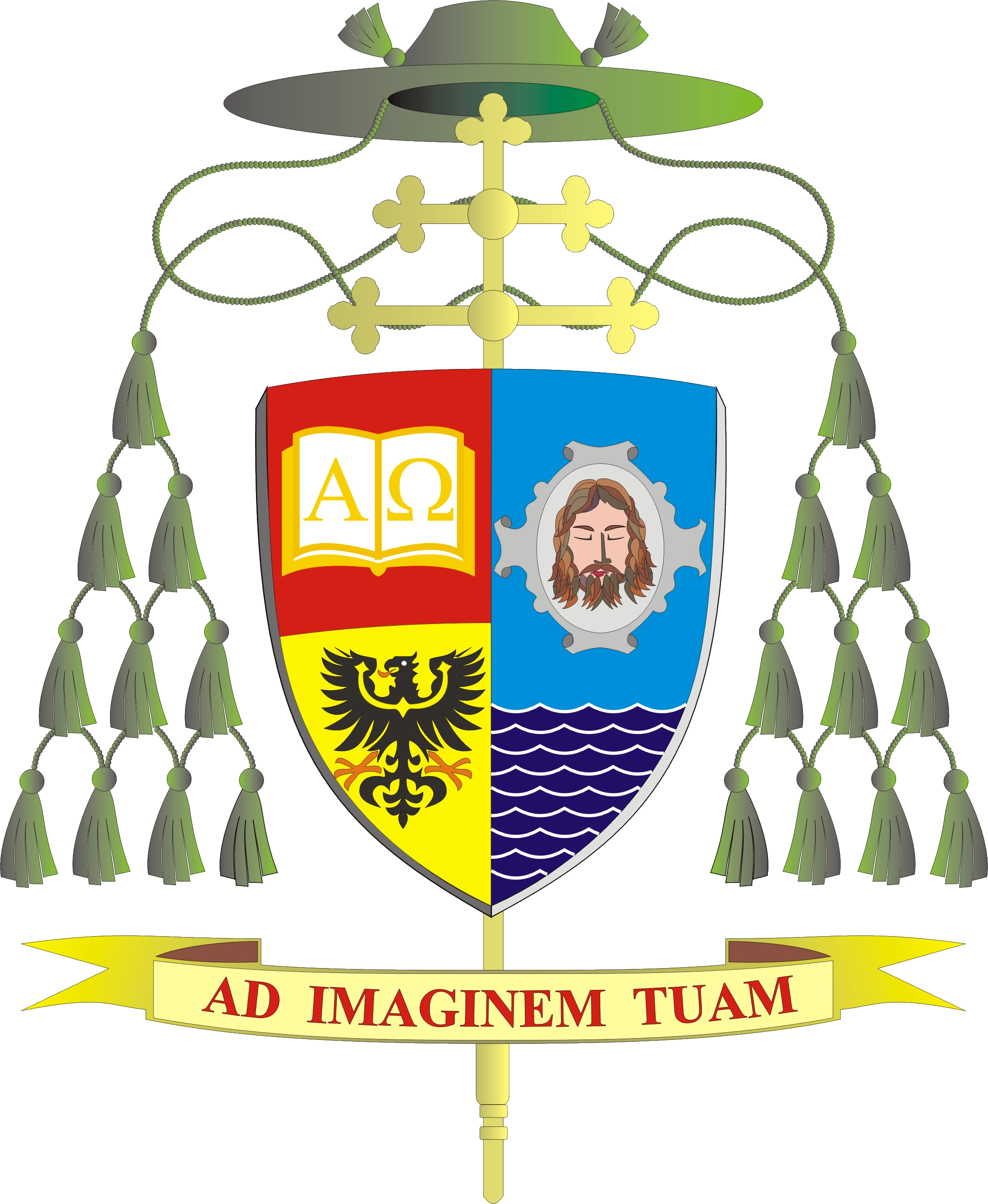
- Coat of arms

Styles of Marian Gołębiewski
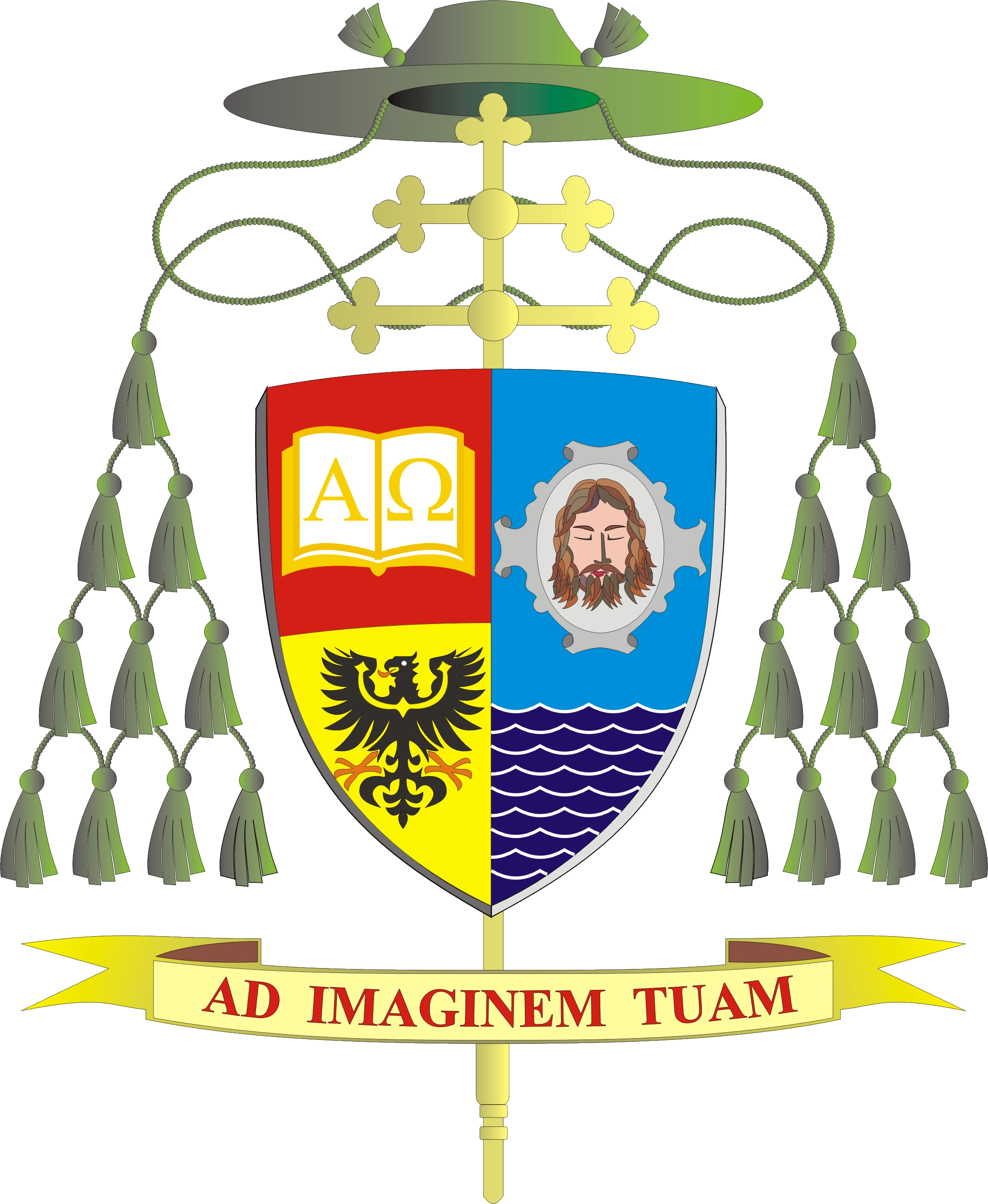
- Reference style: His Excellency; The Most Reverend
- Spoken style: Your Excellency
- Religious style: Archbishop

Marian Gołębiewski (22 September 1937 – 11 March 2024) was a Polish Roman Catholic prelate, who served as an archbishop of Wrocław from 2004 to 2013. From 1996 to 2004, he was Bishop of Koszalin-Kołobrzeg.

== Early life ==
Marian Gołębiewski was born in Trzebuchów on 22 September 1937. From 1952 to 1956, he was a student at the Jan Długosz Minor Seminary in Włocławek, in which he completed an internal exam. He passed a state maturity exam extramurally at Jan Matejko High School in 1956 in Poznań.

From 1956 to 1962, he studied philosophy and theology at the Major Seminary in Włocławek. On 24 June 1962 in the Cathedral of Włocławek he was ordained to the priesthood by Antoni Pawłowski, the diocesan bishop of Włocławek.

From 1966 to 1968, he undertook specialized studies of Sacred Scripture at the Faculty of Theology of the Catholic University of Lublin, which earned him a master's degree and a licentiate in theology. Then, in 1969–1971 he continued to biblical studies at the Pontifical Biblical Institute in Rome, obtaining a bachelor's degree in teachings of the Bible. In 1976 he received his doctorate, which was recognized at the Catholic University of Lublin.

In the academic year 1992–1993 he was a scholarship student at the Institut catholique de Paris in Paris, and in 1994 he attended the Academy of Catholic Theology in Warsaw, where his studies centered on hymns in Deutero-Isaiah (40-48) and he was awarded a PhD in theology.

== After retirement ==
In 2021 the Holy See punished Gołębiewski together with around ten other Polish bishops and archbishops over reported cover-ups of sexual abuse of minors by priests under their authority.

The Vatican had reviewed reports of alleged negligence by the retired archbishop. The probe covered the years from 1996 to 2004, when Gołębiewski was head of the Koszalin diocese, and 2004 to 2013, when he led the Wrocław archdiocese.

As a result, the Vatican banned Gołębiewski from appearing at any public religious or lay ceremonies and ordered him to donate from his own pocket to a foundation preventing sexual abuse and supporting its victims. He was made to do repentance.

Gołębiewski died on 11 March 2024, at the age of 86.

Catholic Church titles
Preceded by Henryk Gulbinowicz	Archbishop of Wrocław; 2004–2013	Succeeded by Józef Kupny
Preceded by Czesław Domin	Bishop of Koszalin-Kołobrzeg; 1996–2004	Succeeded by Kazimierz Nycz
