= Leopold von Sedlnitzky =

German bishop (1787–1871)

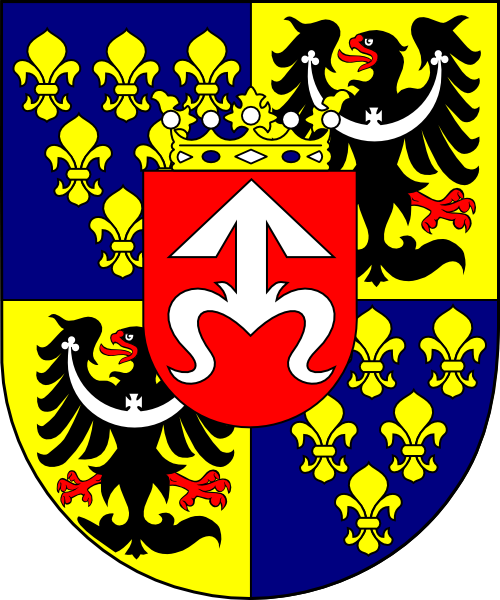
Coat of arms of bishop Sedlnitzky Leopold

Leopold von Sedlnitzky (29 July 1787 – 25 March 1871) was a Roman Catholic bishop of Breslau, who converted to Protestantism after abdicating as bishop.

== Early life ==
Leopold von Sedlnitzky also known as Count Leopold Sedlnitzky Odrowąż Choltitz was born on 29 July 1787 in Geppersdorf, Austrian Silesia. He came from the Moravian-Silesian noble family of Sedlnitzky Choltitz. His parents, Joseph Imperial Count of Sedlnitzky and Maria Josepha, Countess of Haugwitz influenced his spiritual outlook early on. His brother Joseph was an Austrian civil servant.

== Career ==
He studied philosophy and theology at the University of Breslau but returned home to continue his studies privately in 1807 when Wrocław was affected by the Napoleonic Wars. He graduated and was ordained in 1811.

In 1819 he became a canon in Breslau (Wrocław) and in 1830, with royal support, provost. In December 1832 he was made a vicar.

The Prussian government chose him to be bishop of Breslau in 1835, but he resigned in October 1840. After abdicating he moved to Berlin where he was made a privy-councillor by King Friedrich Wilhelm IV.

Then in 1863 he became a Protestant.

His interest in education continued as a Protestant. He founded the Paulinum, a dormitory for Protestant high school students, and in 1869 the Johanneum, a boarding school for Protestant theology students. In his will, he also gave to the Breslau Evangelical Theological college.

== Churchmanship ==
In his youth he was accused of membership of the Johann Michael Sailer Society, and as Prince-Bishop he was neither clear nor firm in his maintenance of the doctrines of the Church including on the question of mixed marriages. As Bishop held a toleration of non-Catholic children's education. Pope Gregory XVI, asked him to resign his see in 1840, after which he went to Berlin, where he became a Protestant in 1862.

In 1871 he died in Berlin and was buried in the Protestant cemetery in Ręków, Sobótka (modern Poland).

Religious titles
Preceded by Emanuel von Schimonsky	Bishop of Breslau; 1836–1840	Succeeded by Joseph Knauer
