= John (bishop of Wrocław) =

Polish bishop

John I of Nysa, born in Nysa, in the Silesian Piast family, he received a high rank nobile title as Prince-Bishop of Nysa later known as Bishop of Wrocław was a Bishop of Wrocław. Very little is known of him except his office was from 1063 till his death in 1072. The historical records from his time in office are very sparse. Poland had been ravaged by a pagan uprising that left diocese of Wroclaw, founded a generation earlier, in a precarious condition. He spent most of his bishopric rebuilding the church. It is probable that he was the bishop who consecrated the cathedral built by Casimir the Restorer. He was succeeded by Piotr I.
