= Peter II Nowak =

Bishop of Wrocław, 1447–1456

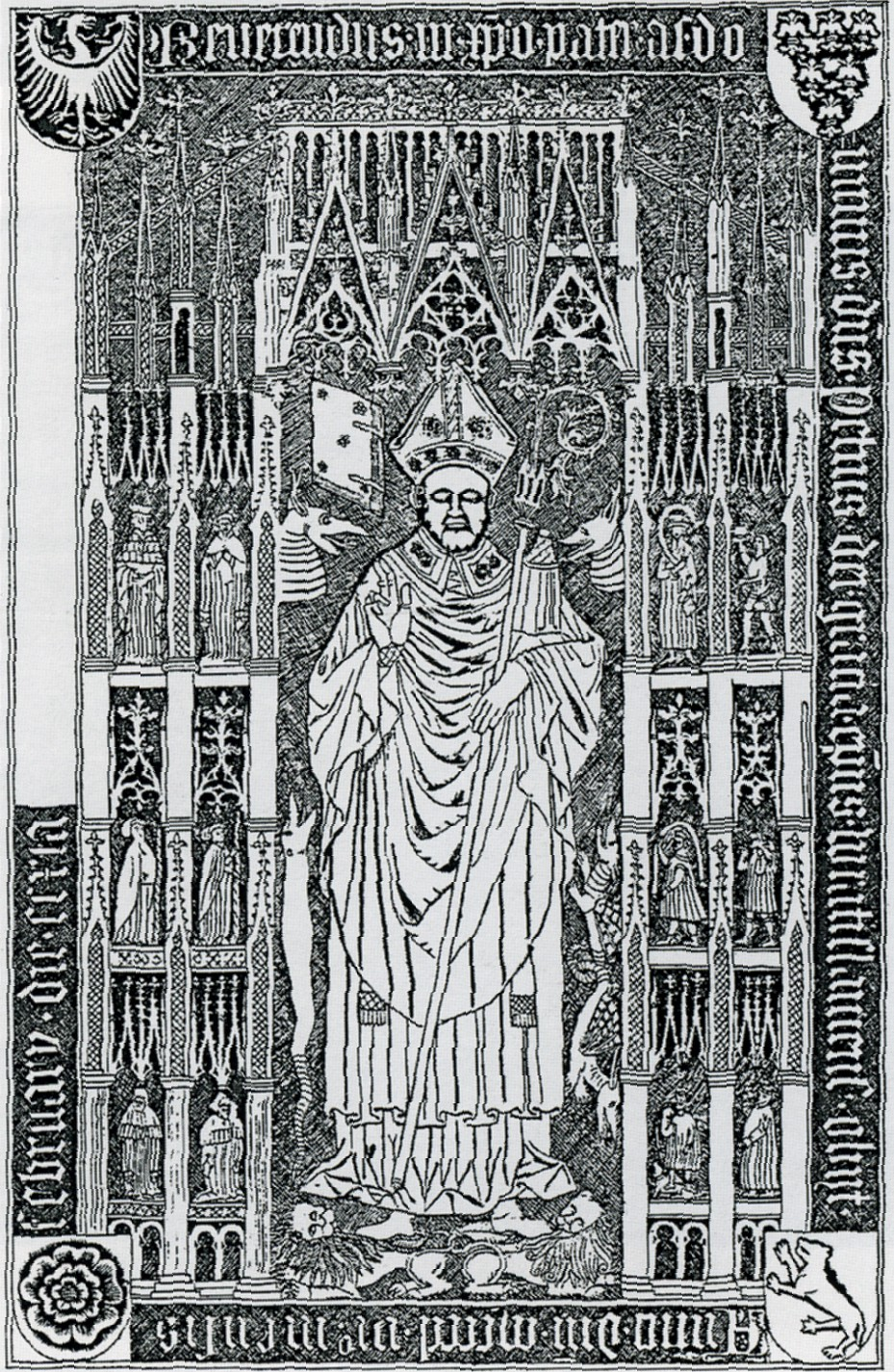
Biskup Piotr Nowak.

Peter II Nowak was a 15th-century Bishop of Wrocław, Poland.

Peter, as provost of the cathedral succeeded Konrad IV the Elder as Bishop of both Wrocław and the Ecclesiastical Duchy of Nysa.

As bishop Peter succeeded in restoring the diocesan finances and redeeming most of the church lands which his predecessor had mortgaged. He also sought, at the 1454AD synod to restore discipline within the diocese.

Religious titles
Preceded by Konrad IV the Elder	Bishop of Wrocław; 1447–1456	Succeeded by Jošt of Rožmberk
