= Emanuel von Schimonsky =

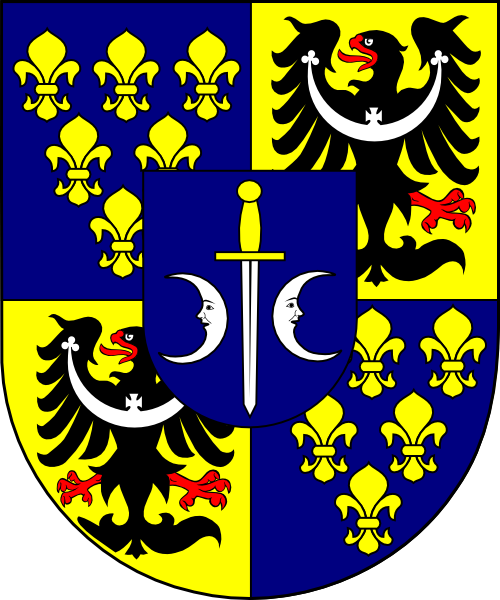
Coat of arms of Bishop Emanuel Schimonsky

Emmanuel von Schimonsky (1752-1832) was Prince-Bishop of Wrocław from 1823 to 1832.

== Early life ==
Emmanuel von Schimonsky was born on 23 July 1752 in Brzeźnica, the son of alderman Joseph von Schimonsky. He studied in Wrocław, and later at the Lateran in Rome where he was ordained in 1775. He returned to Silesia and was a pastor in Łany. At the same time, he served as dean and episcopal commissioner.

In 1793 he became a canon and vicar general of the diocese of Wrocław, and in 1797AD an auxiliary bishop. In 1817 AD he was appointed by Pope Pius VII administrator of the bishopric. In 1823 he became bishop of the diocese of Wrocław. He died on 27 December 1832.

A conservative, he fought the effects of the French Revolution in the form of Josephinism and teachings of the Enlightenment amid a backdrop of changing relationships between the Church, the Roman Curia and the Prussian government. He died on 27 December 1832 in Wrocław.
