= Martin of Gerstmann =

Polish bishop and governor

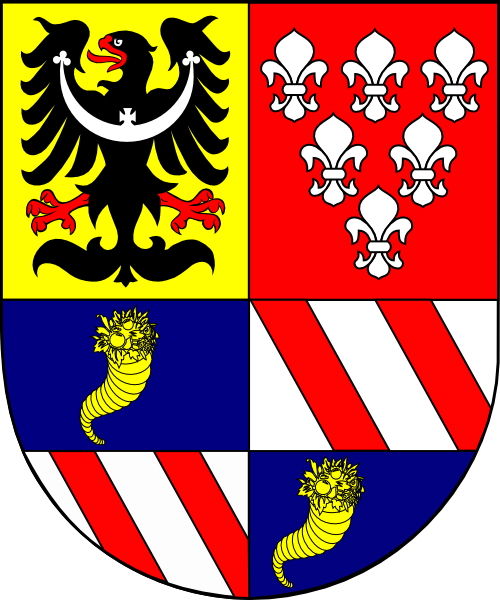
Gerstmann Martin coat of arms

Martin von Gerstmann (1527–1585) was Bishop of Breslau in the years 1574 to 1585, and governor of Silesia.

Martin Gerstmann was born into a family of Protestant clothier, on March 8, 1527, in Bunzlau. He studied in Frankfurt an der Oder and Padua, where he earned a doctorate in both Canon and civil law. In Padua he converted to Catholicism. In 1561. He became a canon of the cathedral of Breslau, in 1571 and dean in 1558. He was Chancellor of the bishopric of Olmütz, and then tutor the children of the emperor and the secretary of Emperor Maximilian II.

In 1571 he was made a noble and on July 1, 1574AD his Chapter elected him bishop. As bishop he tried to keep a good relationship with Protestants and allow for freedom of religion in the principality. On the other hand, at the Synod in 1580. Adopted the provisions of the Council of Trent. Martin Gerstmann died 23 June 1585AD In Neisse and was buried in the church of St. James in Nysa.
