= Józef Kupny =

Polish archbishop

His Excellency Józef Piotr Kupny
- Archbishop of Wrocław
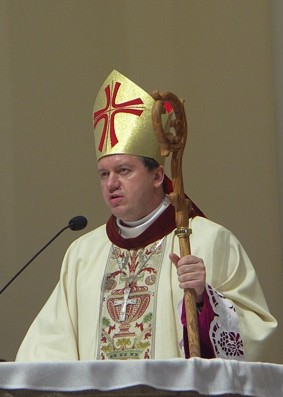
- Church: Roman Catholic
- Archdiocese: Roman Catholic Archdiocese of Wrocław
- Appointed: 18 May 2013
- Installed: 16 June 2013
- Predecessor: Marian Gołębiewski

Orders
- Ordination: 31 March 1983 by Herbert Bednorz
- Consecration: 4 February 2006 by Damian Zimoń

Personal details
- Born: February 23, 1956 (age 70) Piekary Śląskie, Poland
- Motto: Christus dilexit nos (English: Christ loved us)
- Coat of arms

Józef Piotr Kupny (born 23 February 1956) is a Polish Roman Catholic prelate. He has been archbishop of Wrocław since 2013 and vice president of the Polish Episcopal Conference since 2024. He was previously auxiliary bishop of the Archdiocese of Katowice from 2006 to 2013.

Kupny is also an academic and author of various sociological publications. He has worked primarily in the sociology of religion and ethics.

== Biography ==
Kupny was born on 23 February 1956 in the Dąbrówka Wielka district of Piekary Śląskie to John and Matilda Kupny.

At 27 years old, after completing studies at the Major Seminary of Katowice, Kupny was ordained a priest on 31 March 1983 by Herbert Bednorz, bishop emeritus of Katowice.

Kupny completed his undergraduate studies at the Pontifical University of John Paul II in Krakow and his master's degree in sociology from John Paul II Catholic University of Lublin (KUL). He completed the S.T.L. in 1986. In 1993, Kupny earned the S.T.D. at KUL with a thesis titled Antropologiczne podstawy nauczania społecznego Jana Pawła II (English: Anthropological foundations of the social teaching of John Paul II).

He was appointed an auxiliary bishop of Katowice on 21 December 2005 by Pope Benedict XVI.

He consecrated bishop on 4 February 2006, at the age of 49. The principal consecrator was Archbishop Damian Zimoń assisted by co-consecrators Bishop Wiktor Skworc and Bishop Stefan Cichy.

Kupny is a member of the Order of the Holy Sepulchre, and, because of his episcopal title, holds the rank of Knight Commander with Star. He has presided over the Order's activities within Wrocław.

On 18 May 2013, Pope Francis appointed Kupny archbishop of Wrocław. With that appointment, he also became Grand Chancellor of the Pontifical Faculty of Theology in Wrocław.

On March 14, 2024, Kupny was elected vice president of the Polish Episcopal Conference (KEP).

| Preceded by Marian Gołębiewski | Archbishop of Wrocław since 2013 | incumbent |
