= Heymo (bishop of Wrocław) =

Polish bishop

- Diocese: Wrocław
- In office: 1120–1126

Heymo was a medieval Bishop of Wrocław, Poland from 1120–1126.

Little is known about his origins, career or his Episcopal work, although he was probably from Lorraine or Flanders. He founded the Benedictine Abbey in Ołbin.

Religious titles
| Preceded by Siroslaus I | Bishop of Wrocław; 1120–1126 | Succeeded by Robert I |
