= Rudolf of Rüdesheim =

German Bishop of Breslau and papal legate

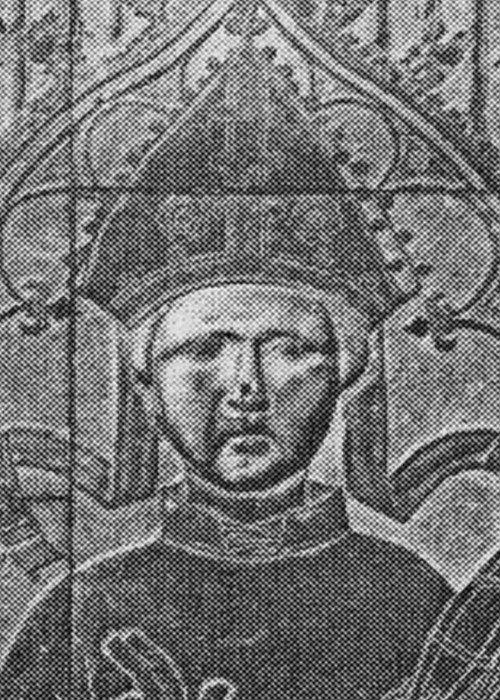
Rudolf von Ruedesheim.

Rudolf of Rüdesheim (about 1402 at Rüdesheim on the Rhine – January 1482 at Breslau) was a German Bishop of Breslau and papal legate.

From 1422 to 1426 he studied at the University of Heidelberg from which he graduated as a master. He then proceeded to Italy, graduated as a doctor in ecclesiastical law and became an auditor of the Rota.

Numerous benefices were conferred upon him at an early date, particularly in the diocese of Mainz and diocese of Worms. From 1438 onward he represented the cathedral chapter of the latter city at the schismatic Council of Basle, where he formed a friendship with Enea Silvio de' Piccolomini, subsequently Pope Pius II. The latter, his successor Pope Paul II, and Emperor Frederick III entrusted Rudolf with important missions and difficult negotiations.

Pius II named him in 1463 Bishop of Lavant in Tyrol. The See of Breslau was conferred on him in 1468, at a time when the inhabitants were resisting their ruler, George Podiebrad, King of Bohemia. The latter had been deposed and excommunicated, but maintained his position as ruler.

The war which resulted was protracted beyond Podiebrad's lifetime and terminated, with Rudolf's co-operation, in the Peace of Olomouc in 1479. The bishop sought to heal the wounds of the war, and insisted upon the importance of theological training of the clergy. Synods held in 1473 and 1475 record his acts.
