= Piotr I (bishop of Wrocław) =

Polish bishop (died 1111)

Piotr I (died 29 January 1111) was a Roman Catholic priest and bishop of Wrocław.

In 1074 after death of bishop Jan he became bishop of Wrocław. According to trustworthy tradition in 1110 he consecrated a church in Ślęża.
