= Paweł z Krosna =

Ruthenian poet and philosopher (1470–1517)

- Born: Paweł Procler c. 1470; Krosno, Subcarpathian Voivodeship, Crown of the Kingdom of Poland
- Died: November 1517 (age c. 47-48; Stary Sącz, Lesser Poland Voivodeship, Crown of the Kingdom of Poland
- Other name: Paweł Rusyn from Krosno

Academic background
- Education: Krakow Academy; University of Greifswald (Bachelor's degree); University of Krakow (Master's degree)

Academic work
- Era: Renaissance in Poland
- School or tradition: Renaissance humanism
- Institutions: University of Krakow

Paweł z Krosna (Note: Latin: Paulus Ruthenus, Ukrainian: Павло́ Ру́син, Polish: Paweł Krosneńczyk, Paweł Procler) (c. 1470 - November 1517) was a Ruthenian poet and philosopher during the Renaissance in Poland. As a poet and philosopher, he wrote in Latin on Statius, drew heavily on the literary tradition of the "Leipzig School", and also heavily incorporated Italian humanist ideas. In addition, he drew on Horatian motifs in correspondences and adopted the model of atopic portraiture.

Born in c. 1470 in Krosno, he came from a partician family of German origin, although he frequently called himself Ruthenian. He first studied at Kraków Academy, but later went to the University of Greifswald to obtain his Bachelor's degree in 1500. Returning to the now Kraków University, he became a guest lecturer and graduated with a Master's degree from the school in 1506. After moving to Hungary in 1508 following an epidemic Krakow, he moved around the courts of Stanisław Thurzon and Gábora Perényiego, while also going to Vienna to publish his works. In 1511 he returned to Poland to work at the University of Krakow, where he worked at until 1516. Leaving Krakow in 1517 following another epidemic, he traveled back to Hungary to escape the Bubonic plague but died from apoplexy in 1517.

== Early life ==
Pavlo was born in c. 1470 in Krosno, which was then part of the Subcarpathian Voivodeship in the Crown of the Kingdom of Poland but mostly inhabited by Lemkos. It was first thought he came from a poor family and was called Gruelus, but it was later established that he came from a patrician family. His father, Jan Procler, was either the Mayor of Krosno or a proconsul and of German origin. Although he signed himself off with "Ruthenus", there has been a debate about whether he is Ruthenian or a Ruthenian of German origin. He also had a stepmother named Katarzyna.

In 1491, he started marticulating at Kraków Academy as "Paulus Johannis de Crosna", but did not take systematic studies and just attended the teachings. After a while, he went to the University of Greifswald where he obtained his Bachelor's degree on 29 January 1500. He met Peter of Ravenna there, who taught Roman and canon law. He immediately went back to Kraków after finishing his studies there alongside Johannes Dantiscus, whom he was tutoring. He then started lecturing as an extraneus (guest lecturer) at Kraków University, graduating with a master's degree from the university in 1506.

== Career ==
In the summer of 1508 he was due to start working as a junior colleague and also do lectures, particularly on Persius. In 1508, during an epidemic in Kraków, he left the city on 21 July to go to Hungary. After arriving, he stayed in Great Varadyn at the court of Stanisław Thurzon, the future Bishop of Olomouc and the brother of Johann V Thurzo. At the court he wrote numerous Latin works, including two works praising Thurzon and Ladislaus I of Hungary, which he published through Hieronymus Vietor. He then stayed at the court of chamberlain Gábora Perényiego in Vynohradiv. From January to June 1509 he stayed in Vienna for a scientific trip to get acquainted with the University of Vienna, but other details of the trip are unknown. He also managed to get published a volume of his works there by Hieronim.

In 1511 he returned to Poland to work again at the University of Krakow until 1516, where he wrote new poems and got them published in Vienna and in Krakow. In 1513 he dedicated poems to Jan Lubrański and celebrated the royal marriage of Sigismund the Old and Barbara Zapolya. In 1514 he was given permission to go on leave to Hungary to reunite with the patron Perényiego, where he read poetry by Virgil extensively.

Due to another epidemic of the Bubonic Plague in Krakow in 1517, he traveled again to Hungary in 1517, taking refuge in Stary Sącz. He died of apoplexy in November 1517 while staying in Sącz.

== Works ==
In his poems, he primarily wrote in Latin, and was work was part of the Renaissance in Poland. He was one of the first Polish humanist to write on the themes of Statius after Angelo Poliziano's annotation of his work, and drew heavily on the literary tradition of the "Leipzig School" led by Christoph Sutchen while also incorporating Italian humanist ideas from Filippo Beroaldo and Politianus.

His work also drew on Horatian motifs, similarly to Nicolas Copernicus. While he never followed Conrad Celtis's school, Celtis also had an influence on his work, particularly in his 1513 edition of Troas by Seneca the Younger. He adopted the model of atopic portraiture, which came from Plato's Symposium, particularly in his correspondences and letters and would later adopt the title of "patron of the Muses".
