= Królowe =

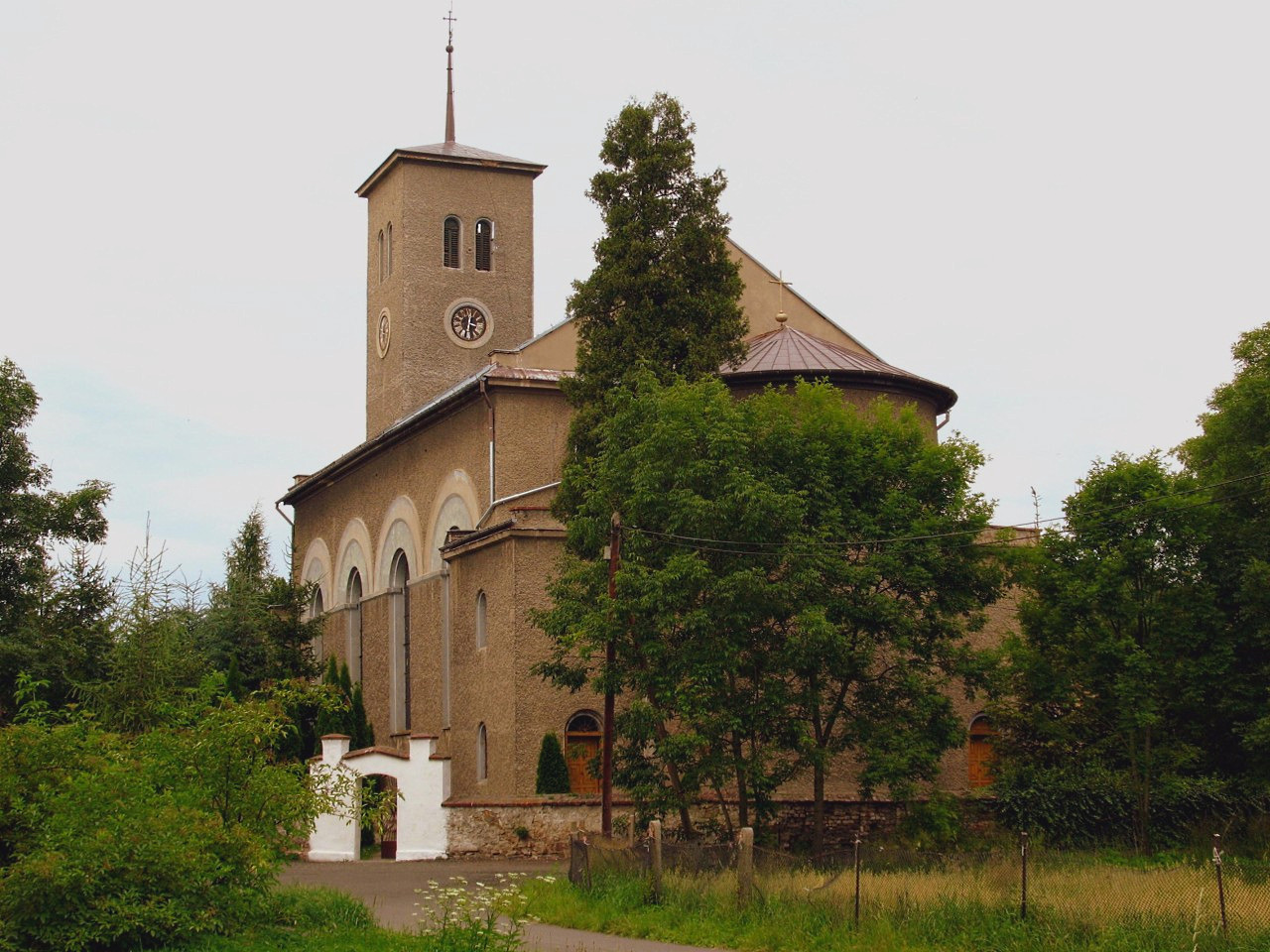
- Saint Lawrence church

- Location within Poland
- Coordinates: 50°15′22″N 17°50′13″E
- Country: Poland
- Voivodeship: Opole
- County: Głubczyce
- Gmina: Głubczyce
- Time zone: UTC+1 (CET)
  - Summer (DST): UTC+2 (CEST)
- Postal code: 48-118
- Area code: +48 77
- Car plates: OGL

Królowe [kruˈlɔvɛ] is a village located in the Opole Voivodeship (south-western Poland), Głubczyce County, Gmina Głubczyce.

== Monuments ==
The following monuments are listed by the Narodowy Instytut Dziedzictwa.

- kościół par. pw. św. Wawrzyńca, z l. 1847–1849

19th century Parish church.

- zagroda nr 10, z XIX w.

Historic homestead from the 19th century.

- zagroda nr 33

Historic homestead.

- zagroda nr 44

Historic homestead.

- zagroda nr 55/57, XIX w.

Historic homestead from the 19th century.

- zagroda nr 73

Historic homestead.

== Notable peoples ==
Anton Froehlich (1860, Królowe – 1931, Chorzów), Upper Silesian wholesale merchant, mill owner 'First Königshütte Steam Mill', chairman of the supervisory board of Śląski Bank Ludowy Królewsk Huta, G.-Śl., father of Silesian priest and martyr August Froehlich

== See also ==
- Królowe Stojło
