= August Froehlich =

Upper Silesian Roman Catholic priest (1891-1942)

August Froehlich (26 January 1891 – 22 June 1942) was an Upper Silesian Roman Catholic priest. In his pastoral activity he opposed National Socialism. He campaigned in the name of German Catholics and of Polish forced labourers. He died in Dachau concentration camp.

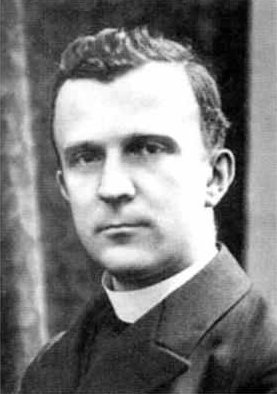
August Froehlich

== Biography ==
August Froehlich was born in 1891 in a well-to-do indigenous Upper Silesian business family in Königshütte (now Chorzów) in Upper Silesia. He was one of the six children of Johanna and Anton Froehlich. His father, originally from Królowe/Leobschütz district, owned the 'First Königshütte Steam Mill' and was chairman of the supervisory board of Śląski Bank Ludowy Królewska Huta. In 1912 young Froehlich started (after education stations in Beuthen and Liegnitz) theological studies in Breslau to become a priest, but before completing it, at the break of the First World War, he was mobilized. He served in the elite 1st (Emperor Alexander) Guards Grenadiers. Soon, while on the Russian front, on 3 July 1915, in one of the first battles, he was seriously injured. Mistakenly taken for dead, he was left on the battlefield and found alive only the following day by German military medics. After his recovery, he resumed his military service, this time in France. Among other medals he received the Iron Cross – first and second class. He was wounded again and became a POW. He returned home to Breslau from British imprisonment in the autumn of 1920, two years after the end of the war. He continued his theological studies in the theology faculty at the Breslau University. On 19 June 1921 August Froehlich was ordained a priest by Cardinal Adolf Bertram in the cathedral of Breslau Diocese. After his first Mass in his home parish Saint Barbara in Königshütte, he was appointed by the Bishop of Breslau to the autonomous Berlin ecclesiastic province. He worked in Berlin and Pomerania.

He spent his first years in Berlin as an assistant priest. The German economy was in post-war crisis, with high inflation. For the young priest it was natural to use a large part of his inheritance and his income to support impoverished families. He supported the "press apostolate" by distributing Catholic daily media and a church bulletin. Thus Catholics had access to newspapers, which were an alternative to non-Christian and, indeed, anti-Christian militant Nazi party press. He showed passive opposition to the Nazi regime. e.g. he refused to join a 1935 collection for the Nazi state, in order to be able to support his own charity works. This caused local group leader of NSDAP to organise a public confrontation. He would also refuse to say the Nazi greeting Heil Hitler and encouraged his parishioners to use traditional greeting Grüß Gott – praised be God. In his letter to the Reichsarbeitsdienstgruppe in Bad Polzin dated 23 September 1935, Father Froehlich explained his reasons why he would end also his letters with the Praise God greeting:

Grüß Gott" ends my letters for the following reasons: for all Christians the greeting "Praise God" is an old German greeting, as is also "Gelobt sei Jesus Christus" ("Praise Jesus Christ") for the Catholics. ... In your previous letter you forebade me to do church announcements after the Sunday Mass because, according to you, the faithful would feel pressure. I request that also you avoid any pressure in spreading your political world view, as you expect from me regarding my religious world view. Political and religious world views may win ... by conviction, never, however, by pressure. According to Concordat, i.e. on the word of the leader (führer), free religious activity is promised to every Catholic. I wear therefore proudly the uniform of a priest and use a Catholic greeting, as you do it also with your uniform and greeting. I have at least just as much courage to show my uniform and my greeting, as I assume you do with yours.

From 1937 to 1942 he lived in Rathenow as a parish priest in the church of Saint Georg. Numerous Polish forced labourers worked in the Rathenow area at the optical armaments company Emil Busch A.G. Because Polish Catholics were not allowed to participate in German worship, August Froehlich and his assistant priest celebrated separate Sunday Masses for them. When he heard about maltreatment of Polish forced labourers (e.g. of a pregnant woman), he brought that courageously into public and spoke about it during church announcements. He contacted the employment office and the management of the Busch company, probably not knowing that their responsible human resources officer Heinrich Meierkord as SA leader had also brought his Jewish brother Max Abraham to the concentration camp.

That caused reaction by Nazi authorities. He was arrested. On 28 July 1941 he was transferred from Potsdam prison to a concentration camp. In the period of eleven months he was in three concentration camps: Buchenwald, Ravensbrück and, finally, Dachau, where he died because of bad prison conditions on 22 June 1942.

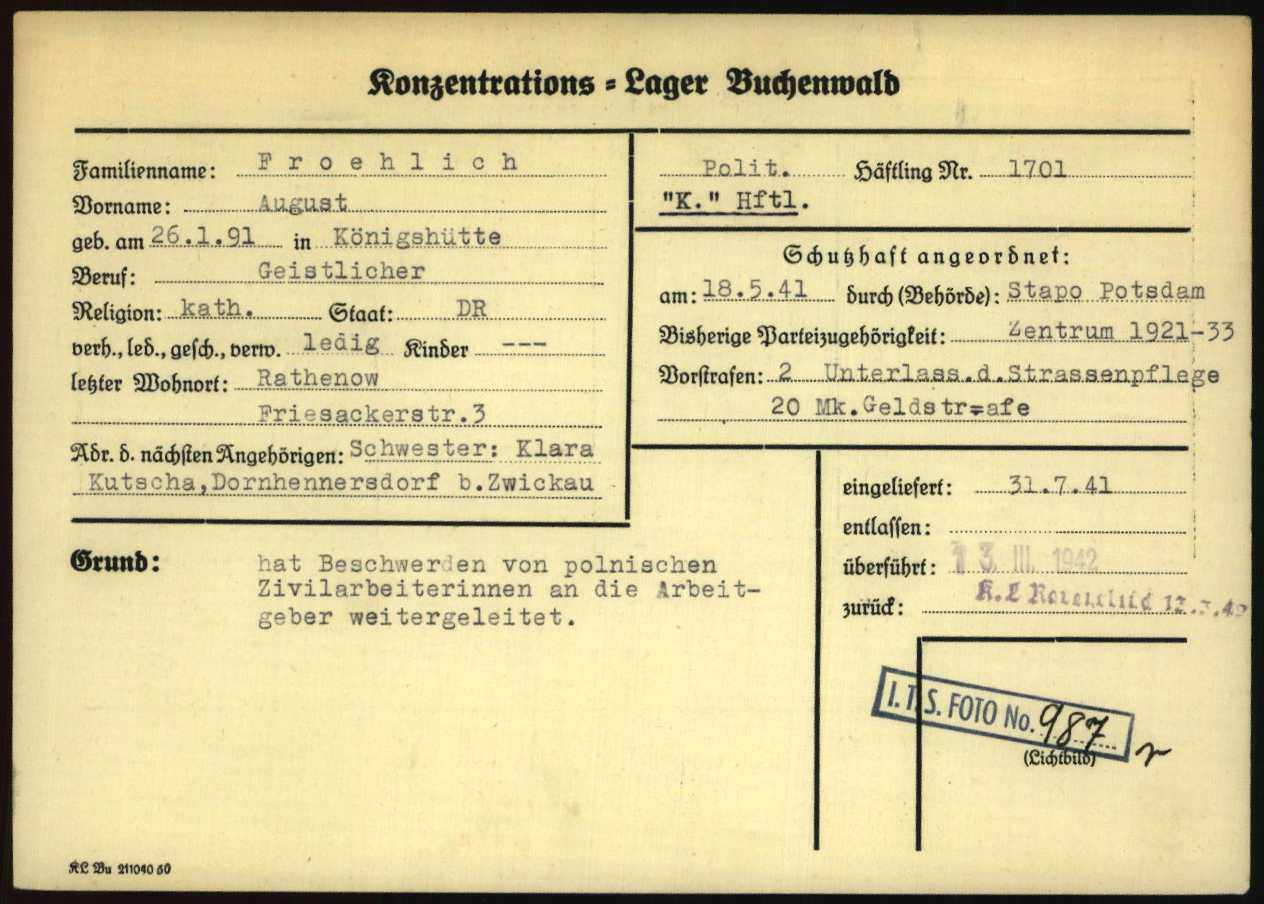
Registration card of August Froehlich as a prisoner at Buchenwald Nazi Concentration Camp.
Reason ("Grund") for imprisonment: "forwarded complaints from Polish civil workers to employers."

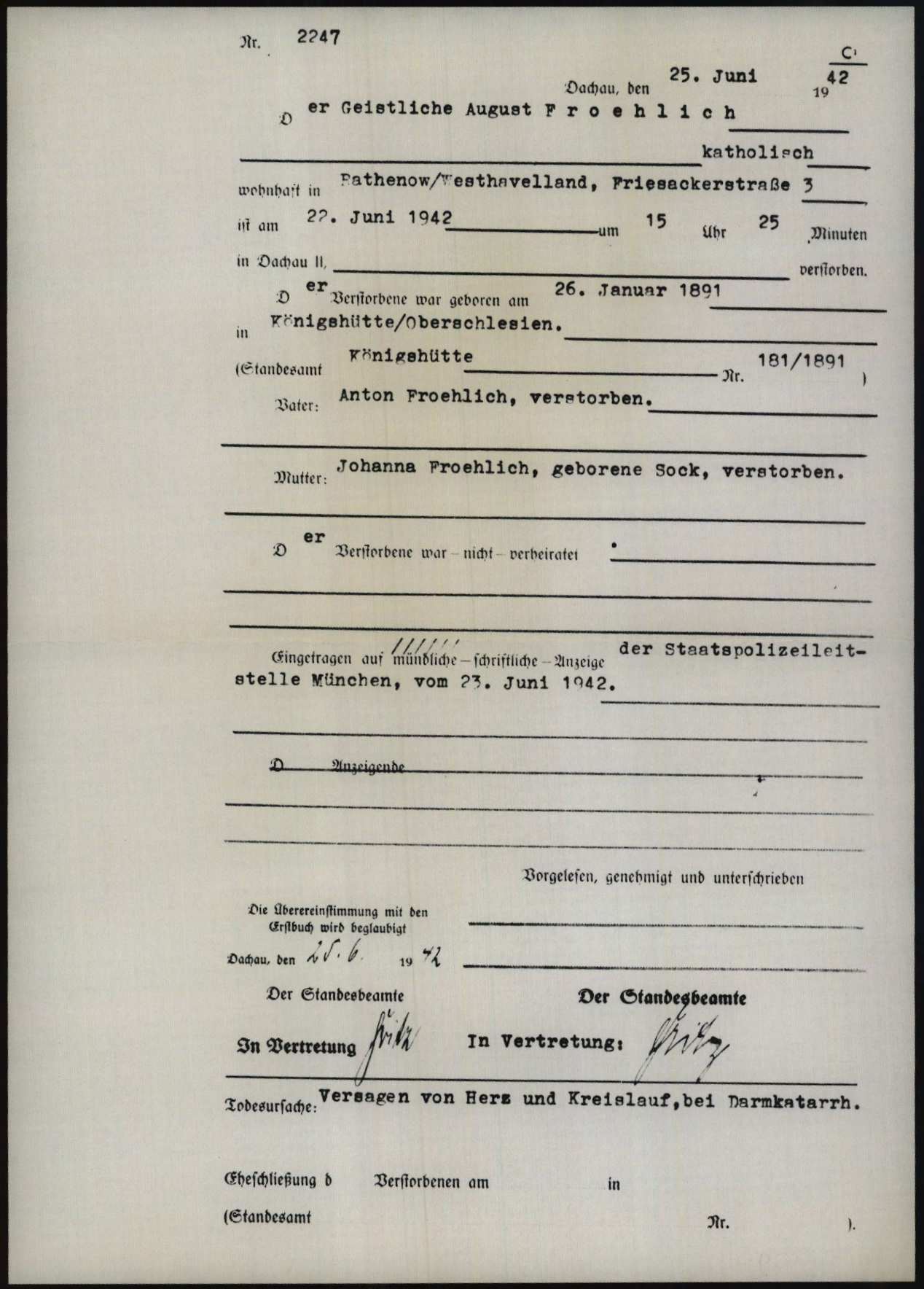
Death certificate (Dachau)
Reported cause of death: "Heart and circulation failure caused by intestinal catarrh."

== Education ==
In 1912 August started his studies in Philosophy, but he could not continue because of the First World War. But finally he was able to finish his studies.

== See also ==
- Priest Barracks of Dachau Concentration Camp

== Memory ==
- Commemorative plaque in a crypt of St. Hedwig's Cathedral in Berlin,
- Commemorative plaque in a church of St. Josef in Berlin-Rudow,
- Commemorative plaque in a church of St. Paul in Drawsko Pomorskie,
- Street named his name August-Froehlich-Straße in Berlin-Rudow,
- Street named his name Pfarrer-Froehlich-Straße in Rathenow.
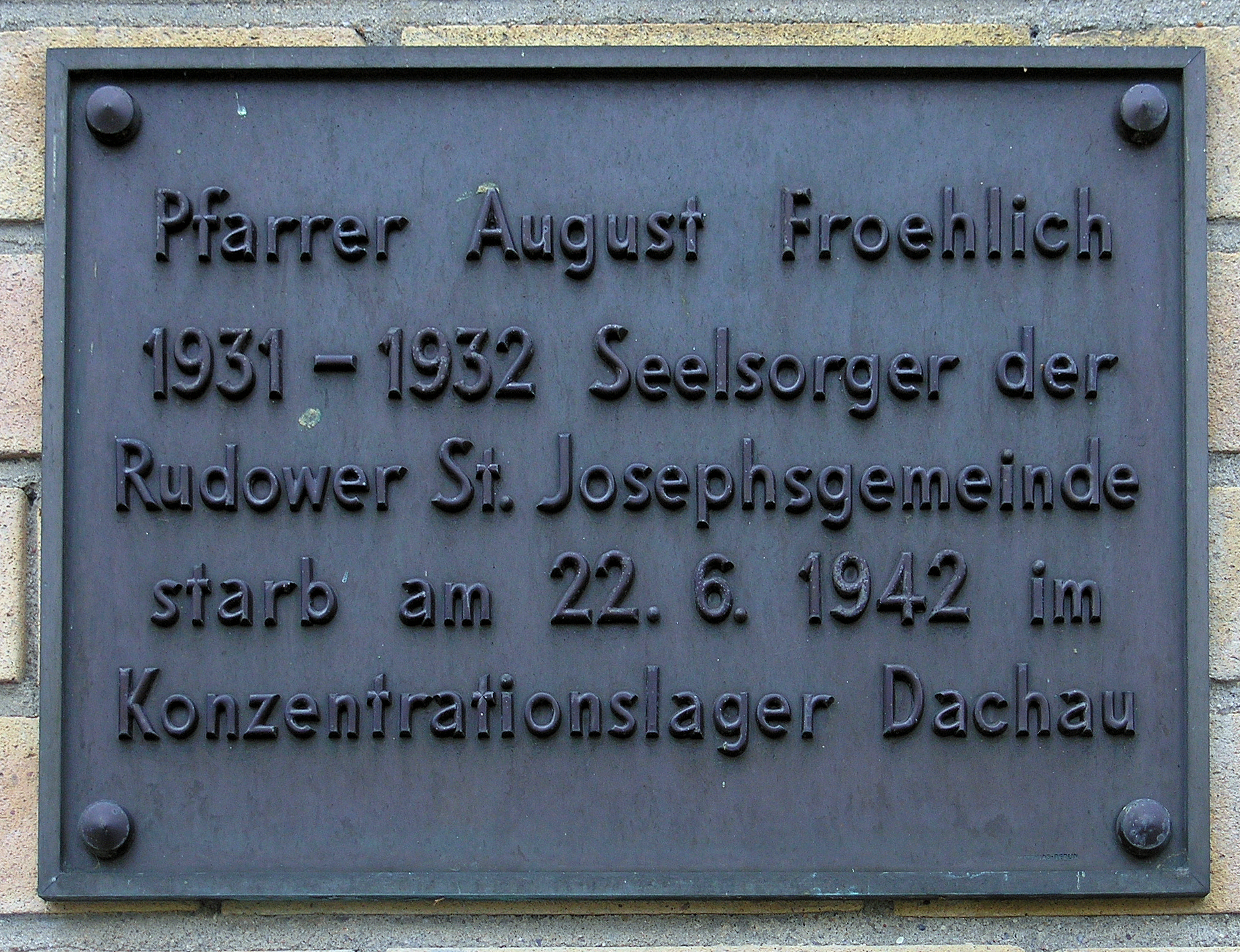
Commemorative plaque in memorial of August Froehlich, in front of St Josef's parish in Berlin-Rudow.

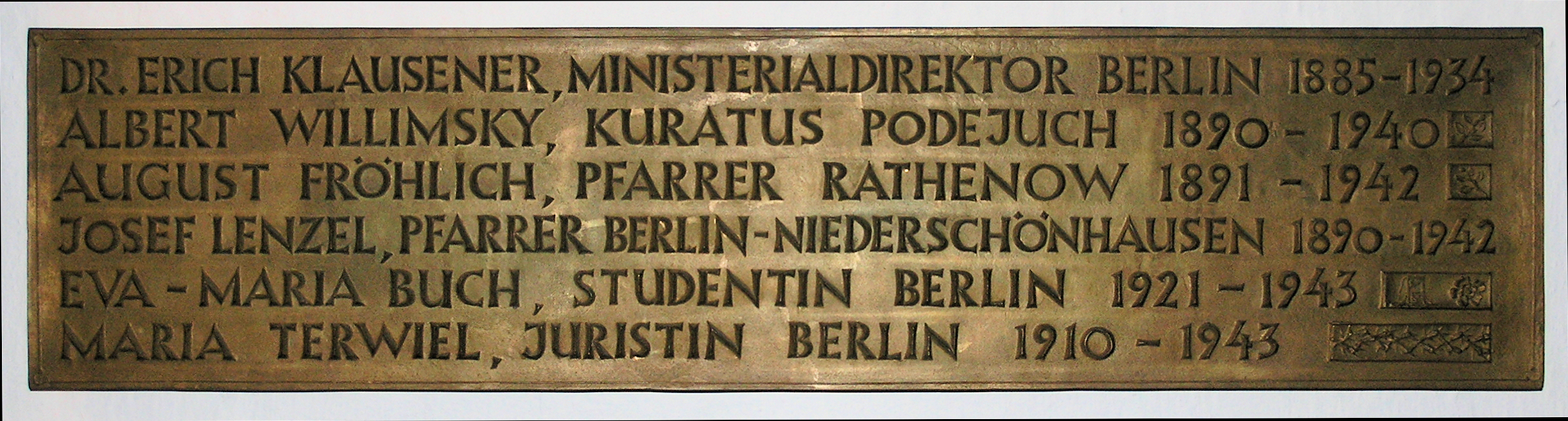
A part of a commemorative plaque in memorial of Catholics of Archdiocese of Berlin murdered during the war, in a crypt of St. Hedwig's Cathedral in Berlin.

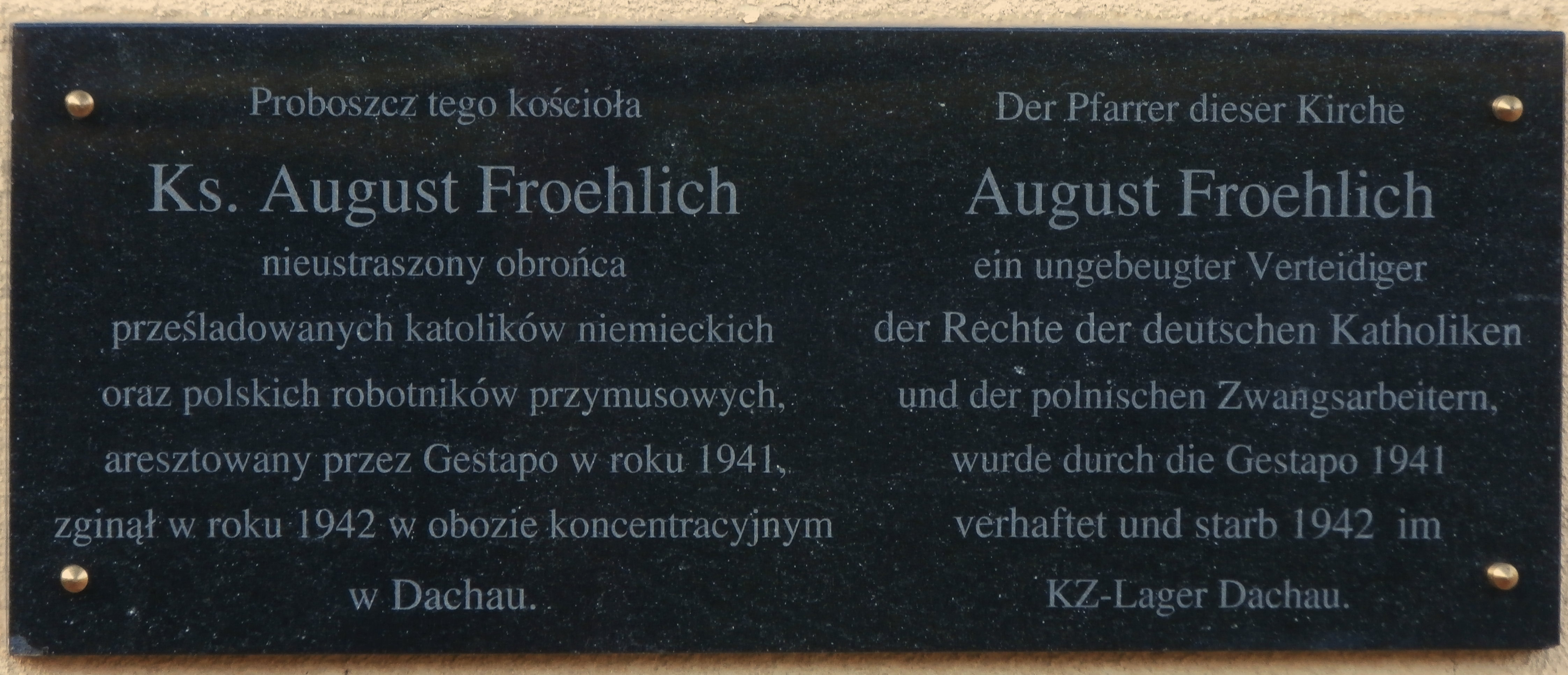
Bilingual commemorative plaque in memorial of Priester August Froehlich in front of St Paul's church in Drawsko Pomorskie.

== Bibliography ==
- Annette Froehlich: Pfarrer August Froehlich : vom Widerstand gegen NS-Willkür zum Märtyrer. Bautz, Nordhausen 2009. ISBN 978-3-88309-494-6
- Karl-Joseph Hummel, Christoph Kösters, Zwangsarbeit und katholische Kirche 1939-1945. Verlag Ferdinand Schöningh, Paderborn 2008. ISBN 978-3-506-75689-3
- Gerhard Lange: Pfarrer August Froehlich. In: Zeugen für Christus. Das deutsche Martyrologium des 20. Jahrhunderts. Hrsg. von Helmut Moll im Auftrag der Deutschen Bischofskonferenz. Paderborn 1999, S. 94–97
- Benedicta Maria Kempner: Priester vor Hitlers Tribunalen, str. 87-91. Verlag Rütten & Loening, München 1966, 1967, 1996. ISBN 978-3-570-12292-1
- Reimund Schnabel: Die Frommen in der Hölle, Geistliche in Dachau. Berlin 1966
- Heinz Kühn: Blutzeugen des Bistums Berlin. Klausener, Lichtenberg, Lampert, Lorenz, Simoleit, Mandrella, Hirsch, Wachsmann, Metzger, Schäfer, Willimsky, Lenzel, Froehlich. Morus-Verlag, Berlin 1952
- Josef Mörsdorf: August Froehlich. Pfarrer von Rathenow. Morus-Verlag, Berlin 1947
- Kurt Willig: Berliner Priester im Konzentrationslager in: Petrusblatt Nr. 4, Bistum Berlin 1945
