= Johann IV Roth =

Roman Catholic bishop of Lavant

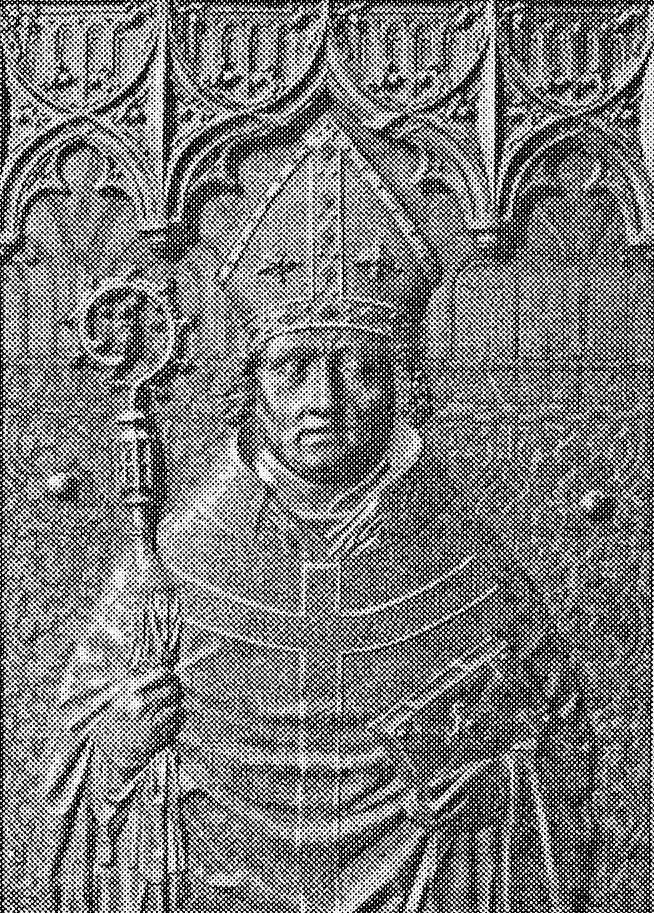
Epitaph by Peter Vischer (1496), Wrocław Cathedral

Johann Roth (Polish: Jan Roth; 30 November 1426 – 21 January 1506) was Bishop of Lavant from 1468 to 1482 and Prince-Bishop of Wrocław (Breslau) from 1482 until his death. He was known as a brilliant speaker, humanist and supporter of the arts and learning.

The son of the shoemaker Seyfried Roth, John was born in the Swabian town of Wemding (in present-day Bavaria). A gifted young man, John studied in Rome with Lorenzo Valla, and then in 1459 at the University of Padua, where he served as rector of the law school and in 1460 earned a doctorate.

== Career ==
He befriended Italian humanists including Enea Silvio and held an office in the papal chancery. Johann already served as a secretary of the Habsburg king Ladislaus the Posthumous until his early death in 1457 and then worked in the chancery of Emperor Frederick III who ennobled him in 1464.

In 1460 he served as a priest in Sankt Georgen, Austria, in 1464 he was dean of the cathedral in Passau and in 1466 he was made dean of the chapter of Wrocław. In 1468 he accompanied Emperor Frederick proceeding to the papal court of Pope Paul II and was appointed Bishop of Lavant in Inner Austria, succeeding Rudolf of Rüdesheim who was elected Prince-Bishop of Wrocław.

John served as an emissary to Rome, to Venice, and most notably to the Hungarian king Matthias Corvinus rivalling with George of Poděbrady in the Bohemian–Hungarian. In 1482 he was appointed coadjutor in Wrocław and upon Rudolf's death succeeded him as Prince-Bishop, elected under pressure from King Matthias. He also served as governor of the Bohemian Duchies of Silesia from 1490 to 1497. On 26 June 1497 he held a synod and later became the target of an assassination attempt by Nicholas II of Niemodlin, who would be executed the following day.

As Bishop Johann constantly conflicted with his cathedral chapter as well as with the Silesian estates and the Piast dukes. Nevertheless he held three diocesan synods, and arranged for the printing of missals, breviary, liturgical and song books. He also amassed a considerable collection of books, of which, however, few remains are left. He was also skilled in finance and administration redeeming several mortgaged estates and castles for the diocese. In 1502 he appointed Johann V Thurzo coadjutor.

== Death ==
John IV Roth died in 1506 in his episcopal residence at Nysa (Neisse) and was buried in Wrocław Cathedral. His epitaph is one of the most significant works by Peter Vischer the Elder.

Religious titles
Preceded by Rudolf of Rüdesheim	Bishop of Lavant; 1468–1482	Succeeded by George I
Preceded by Rudolf of Rüdesheim	Bishop of Wrocław; 1482–1506	Succeeded by John V Thurzó
