= Johann V Thurzo =

15th-century Catholic bishop in Silesia (Poland) (1466–1520

Johann Thurzo
- Bishop of Wrocław
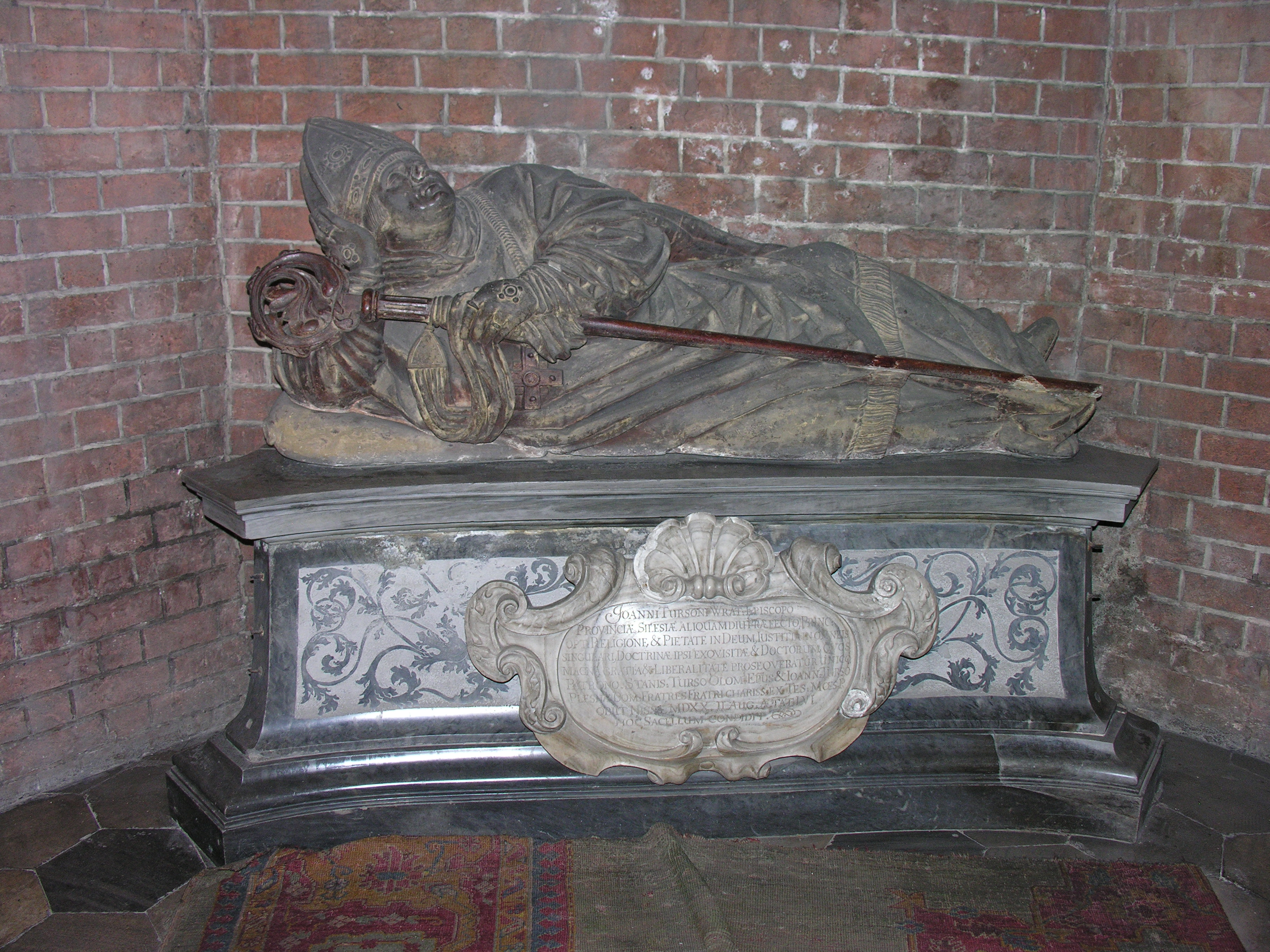
- Church: Catholic
- Diocese: Wrocław
- In office: 21 January 1506 – 2 August 1520
- Predecessor: Johann Roth von Wemding
- Successor: Jakub von Salza
- Previous post: Coadjutor Bishop of Wrocław

Personal details
- Born: 16 April 1464 (Note: Catholic-Hierarchy.org reports that the year of his birth, 1464, as uncertain.) Kraków, Silesia
- Died: 2 August 1520 (aged 56)
- Parents: János Thurzó (father)
- Education: Bachelor of Arts, 1484; Master's degree, 1487

Ordination history
History
Episcopal consecration
- Principal consecrator: Stanislav I Thurzo
- Co-consecrators: John Filipec, Heinrich von Fulstein

Johann V Thurzo (Polish: Jan V Thurzo, Hungarian: Thurzó V. János; 1464–1520) was a 15th-century Bishop of Wrocław in Silesia, now Poland. A great patron and lover of the arts and sciences, Martin Luther called him "the greatest bishop of the century".

Johann was the son of János Thurzó a protestant, Zips Saxon Hungarian nobleman of the Thurzó family and mayor of Kraków, and his first wife, Ursula Bem. Johann gained a Bachelor of Arts in 1484 and a master's degree in 1487, and then studied canon law in Italy.

He was Dean of Wrocław Cathedral from March 1502 and Bishop of Wrocław from 1506 to 1520, while his brother Stanislav was Bishop of Olomouc. As bishop, Johann Thurzo was patron of artists, including Albrecht Dürer and Lucas Cranach, and poets. He corresponded with Martin Luther on matters of theology and was involved in the founding of University of Wittenberg.

== See also ==
- History of Wrocław

== Notes ==
Religious titles
| Preceded by Johann IV Roth | Bishop of Wrocław; 1506–1520 | Succeeded by Jakob of Salza |
