= Stanislav I Thurzo =

Stanislav Thurzó
- Bishop of Olomouc
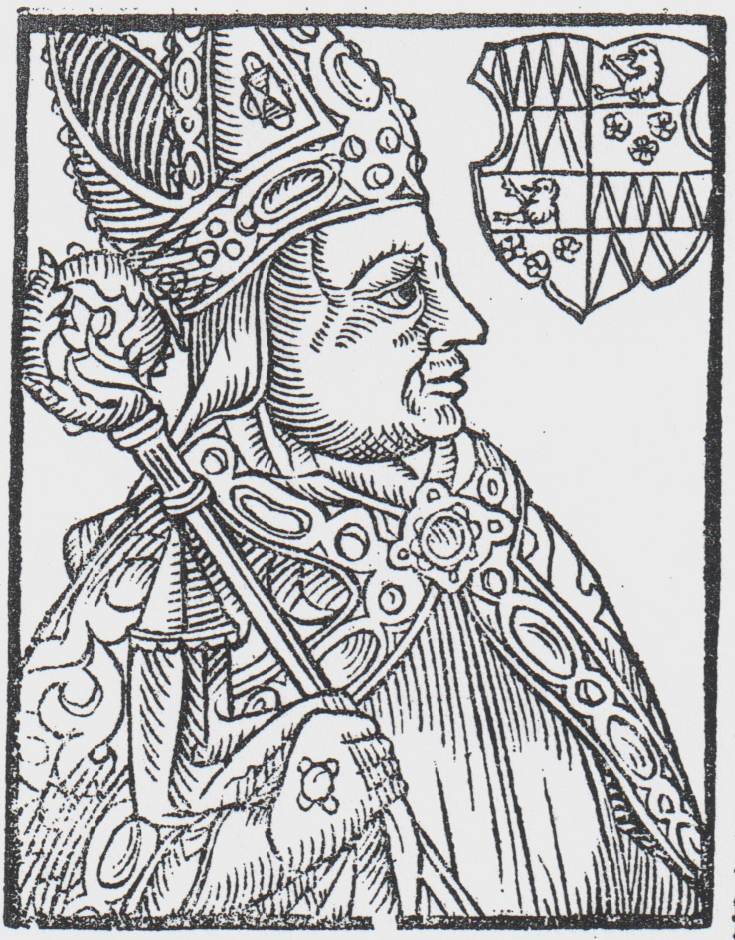
- Stanislav I Thurzó
- Church: Catholic Church
- Diocese: Diocese of Olomouc
- In office: 30 January 1497 – 17 April 1540
- Predecessor: Juan de Borja Lanzol de Romaní, el mayor
- Successor: Bernard Zoubek ze Zdětína

Orders
- Consecration: 30 January 1497

Personal details
- Born: 1470 Kraków, Kingdom of Poland
- Died: 17 April 1540 (aged 69–70) Olomouc, Kingdom of Bohemia, Holy Roman Empire

Stanislav I Thurzo (c. 1470 in Kraków – 16 or 17 April 1540 in Olomouc) was a bishop of the Diocese of Olomouc. Although a Catholic, he was the son of János Thurzó, a protestant Hungarian nobleman of the Thurzó family who was mayor of Kraków, and his first wife, Ursula Boehm. He was educated at Padua in theology and law and was made canon in Olomouc.

He was a humanist and patron of the arts and science, but also undertook radical moral reforms in his diocese, and persecution of protestant groups. He and his brother jointly crowned both Louis II of Hungary, and King of Bohemia Ferdinand I.

Stanislav died in the night 17 April 1540 and was buried in Saint Wenceslas Cathedral, Olomouc.

Religious titles
Preceded by Juan de Borja Lanzol de Romaní, el mayor	Bishop of Olomouc; 1497–1540	Succeeded by Bernard Zoubek of Zdětín
