= Wrocław Cathedral =

Gothic cathedral in Wrocław, Poland

St. John the Baptist Archcathedral
- Archikatedra św. Jana Chrzciciela
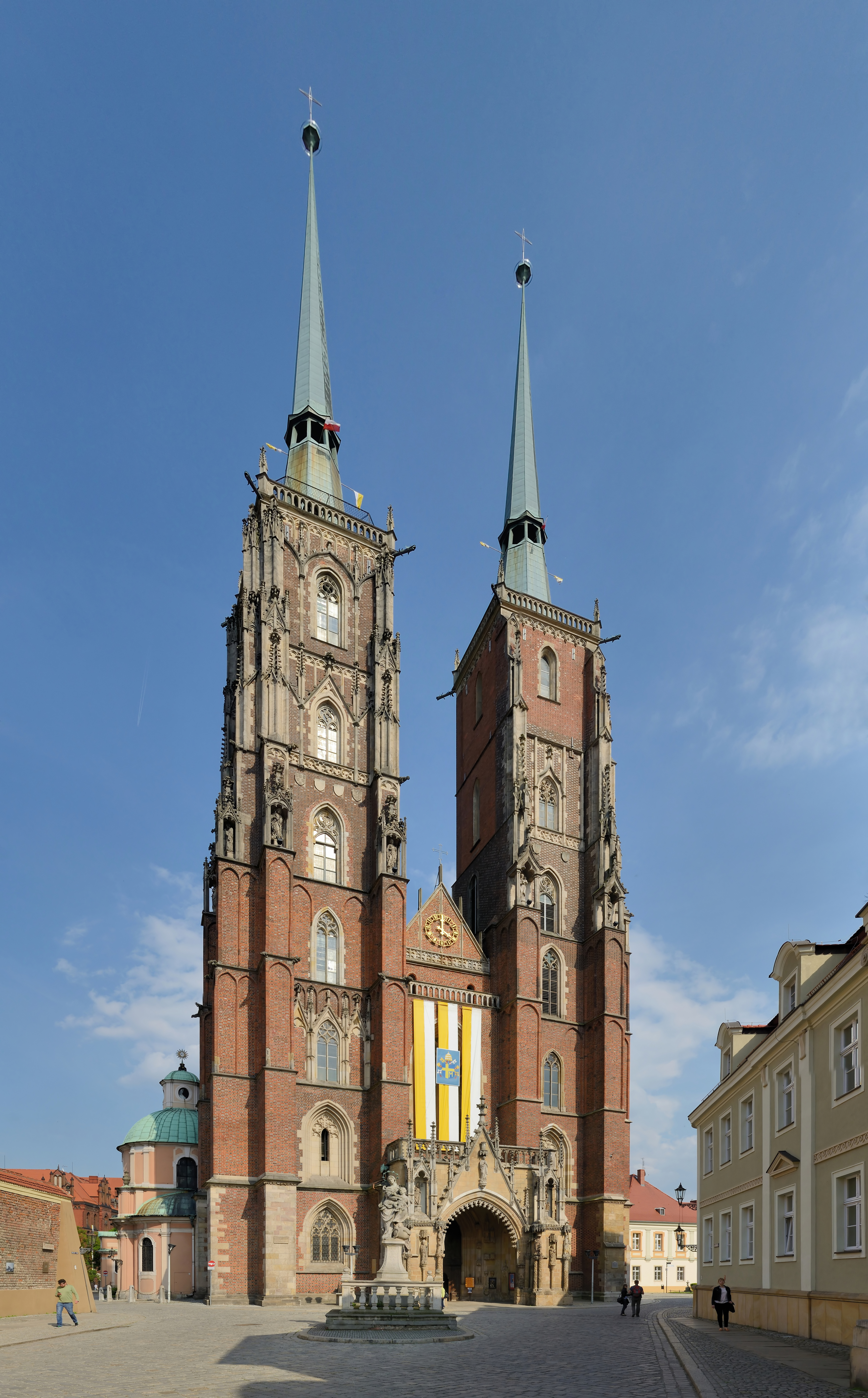

Religion
- Affiliation: Catholic
- Province: Archdiocese of Wrocław
- Rite: Roman Rite
- Year consecrated: 1272

Location
- Location: Cathedral Island, Wrocław
- Interactive map of St. John the Baptist Archcathedral
- Coordinates: 51°06′51″N 17°02′46″E

Architecture
- Style: Gothic
- Completed: 1272 (choir), 1341 (nave), 1951 (roof and vault reconstruction)

Specifications
- Direction of façade: west
- Spire: 2
- Spire height: 98 m (322 ft)
- Materials: stone, brick

Historic Monument of Poland
- Designated: 1994-09-08
- Part of: Wrocław – historic city center
- Reference no.: M.P. 1994 nr 50 poz. 425

The St. John the Baptist Archcathedral (Polish: Archikatedra św. Jana Chrzciciela, German: Breslauer Dom, Kathedrale St. Johannes des Täufers) is the seat of the Archdiocese of Wrocław and a landmark of the city of Wrocław in Poland. The cathedral, located in the Cathedral Island, is a Gothic church with Neo-Gothic additions. The current cathedral is the fourth church to have been built on the site.

Along with the Old Town of Wrocław, it is designated a Historic Monument of Poland.

== History ==
The first church at the location of the present cathedral was built under Přemyslid rule in the mid-10th century, a fieldstone building with one nave about 25 m (82 ft) in length, including a distinctive transept and an apse. After the Polish conquest of Silesia and the founding of the Wrocław diocese under the Piast duke Bolesław I the Brave in 1000, this Bohemian church was replaced by a larger basilical structure with three naves, a crypt, and towers on its eastern side. The first cathedral was however soon destroyed, probably by the invading troops of Duke Bretislaus of Bohemia around 1039. A larger, Romanesque-style church was soon built in its place in the times of Duke Casimir I, and expanded similar to Płock Cathedral on the behest of Bishop Walter of Malonne in 1158.

After the end of the first Mongol invasion of Poland, the church was again largely rebuilt in the present-day Brick Gothic style. It was the first building of the city to be made of brick when construction of the new choir and ambulatory started in 1244. The nave with sacristy and the basements of the prominent western steeples were added under Bishop Nanker until 1341.

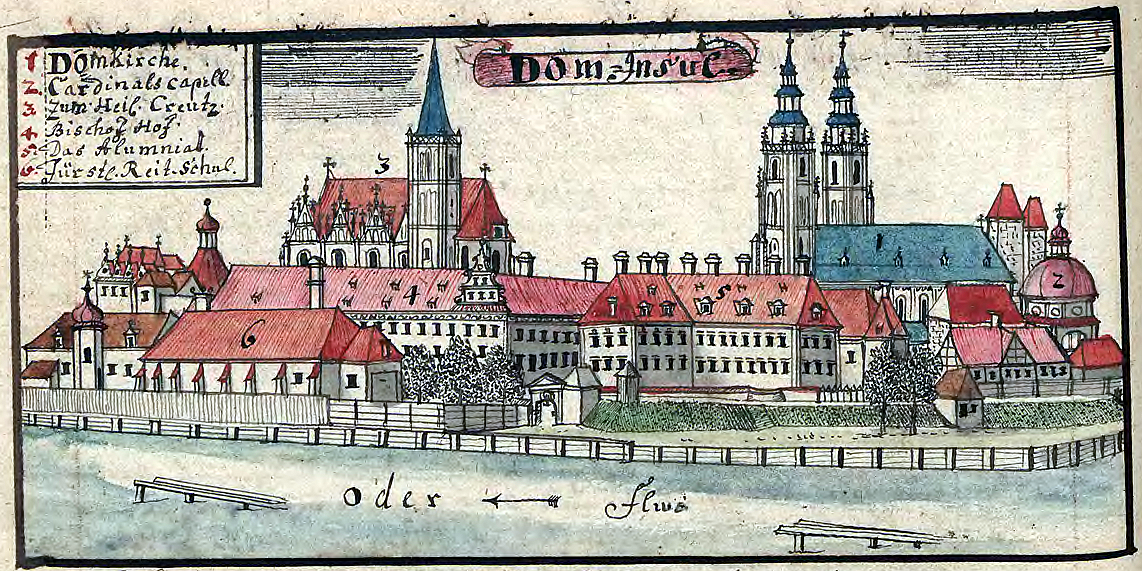
The Cathedral Island in Wrocław, 18th century

On 19 June 1540 a fire destroyed the roof, which was restored 16 years later in Renaissance style. Another fire, on 9 June 1759, burnt the towers, roof, sacristy and quire. The damage was slowly repaired during the following 150 years. Between 1873 and 1875, Karl Lüdecke rebuilt the interior and western side in neogothic style. Further work was done at the beginning of the 20th century by Hugo Hartung, especially on the towers ruined during the 1759 fire.

The cathedral survived the war but was severely damaged (about 70% of the building by that meaning vaults, roof, spires, decoration and the damaged church) during the Siege of Breslau and heavy bombing by the Red Army in the last days of World War II but the medieval gothic structure survived the war. Parts of the interior fittings were saved and are now on display at the National Museum in Warsaw. The initial reconstruction of the roof and vaults of the church lasted until 1951, when it was reconsecrated by Archbishop Stefan Wyszyński. In the following years, additional aspects were rebuilt, renovated and restored. The original, conical shape of the towers was restored only in 1991.

The cathedral holds the largest pipe organ in Poland, built in 1913 by E.F. Walcker & Sons of Ludwigsburg, Baden-Württemberg, Germany, for the Centennial Hall — formerly the largest organ in the world.

== Architecture and furnishings ==
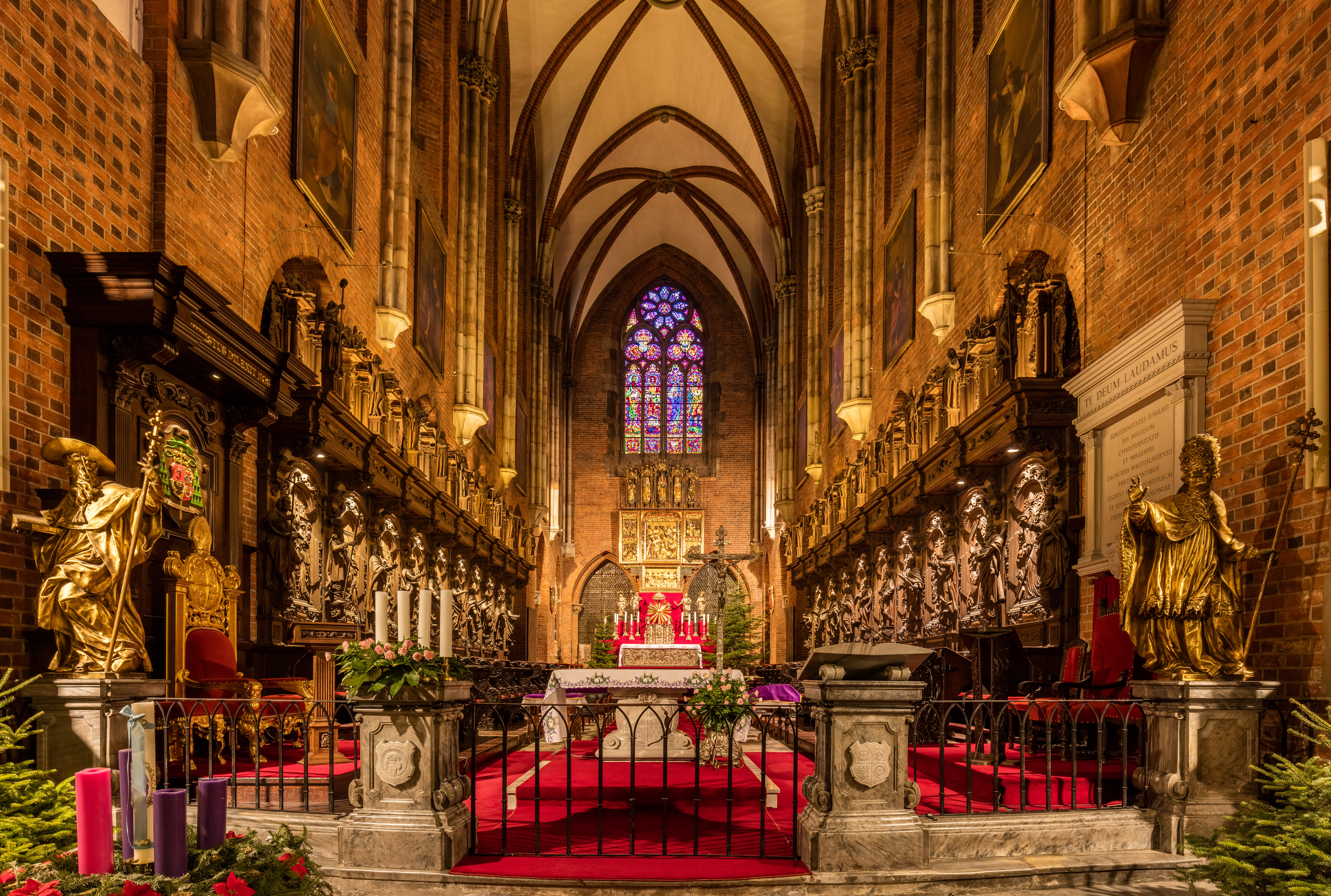
Interior of Wrocław Cathedral

The current cathedral is a three-nave Gothic oriented basilica surrounded by an ambulatory. The cathedral has three entrances: the main western portal and two later entrances from the north and south.

=== Chapels ===
- Behind the choir are three chapels:
  - Chapel of St. Elizabeth in the south was built 1682-1700 as the mausoleum of Bishop Frederick of Hesse-Darmstadt. The chapel was dedicated to St. Elizabeth of Hungary, whose cult had been popular in the city since the Middle Ages. It is a fine example of baroque architecture and forms the counterpoint of the Elector's Chapel. The design was probably the work of Giacome Schianzi, who is also credited with the paintings in the dome, which, along with wall paintings by Andreas Kowalski, show the death, burial, and heavenly glory of St. Elizabeth. The statue of St. Elizabeth was created by Ercole Ferrata, a student of Bernini's. Facing the altar on the other side of the chapel is the cardinal's tomb, the work of Domenico Guidi, another of Bernini's pupils. It depicts the kneeling cardinal surrounded by allegories of Truth and Eternity. Above the door to the church is a bust of the cardinal executed by the workshop of Bernini.
  - The Gothic Marian Chapel directly behind the choir was built by the architect Peschel under the orders of Bishop Przecław of Pogorzela from 1354 to 1365. Apart from the tomb of its founder it also contains the tomb of Bishop Johann IV Roth, the work of Peter Fischer the Elder of Nuremberg. A famous story from World War II concerned a famously beautiful marble statue of the Virgin and Child, created by Carl Johann Steinhäuser in 1854, that was kept in the chapel. When the Russians bombed the cathedral, the flames miraculously stopped in front of the fallen statue, preserving the three back chapels from destruction. Despite the fall, bombing, and general destruction, the statue remained unharmed.
  - The northern Baroque Elector's Chapel, or the Chapel of Corpus Christi, was built from 1716 to 1724 as the mausoleum of bishop Count Palatine Francis Louis of Neuburg. Francis Louis was also bishop of Trier and Magdeburg, making him one of the electors eligible to choose the Holy Roman Emperor, hence the name of the chapel. The designer was the Viennese architect Johann Bernhard Fischer von Erlach. The decorative paintings were the work of Carlo Carlone and the sculptures that of Ferdinand Brokoff.
- The Chapel of St. John the Baptist, adjacent to the north-east tower of the cathedral, was built in 1408 and later rebuilt as the mausoleum of bishop Johann V Thurzo.
- The Redeemer Chapel, now the Chapel of the Blessed Sacrament, was built 1671-72 by the order of the canon Johann Jacob Brunetti to a design by Carlo Rossi. The stucco decoration was the work of Domenico Antonio Rossi. The chapel contains epitaphs or its founder and his brother, auxiliary bishop Johann Brunetti. It is located at the fourth bay of the south aisle.
- The Chapel of the Resurrection, formerly the Mortuary Chapel, was built in 1749 through a donation of Dean Johann Christoph von Rummerskirch to a possible design by Bartholomäus Wittwer. The screen was the work of Felix Anton Scheffler: the stucco work and paintings by Raphael Joseph Albert Schall and Theodor Hamacher. It is located in the second bay of the north aisle.
- The Chapel of St. Casimir, formerly dedicated to St. Leopold, was formerly the home of a famous triptych commissioned in 1468 by the canon Peter von Wartenberg. However, after World War II the painting was sent to the National Museum, Warsaw.

=== Bells ===
	Weight	Tone	Year cast	Caster
Small Bell	~ 600 kg	ais’	1921	Mitteldeutsche Stahlwerke Lauchhammer AG
Medium Bell	~ 850 kg	gis’	1921	Mitteldeutsche Stahlwerke Lauchhammer AG
Large Bell	~ 1400 kg	f’	1921	Mitteldeutsche Stahlwerke Lauchhammer AG
Largest Bell	~ 2500 kg	cis’	1921	Mitteldeutsche Stahlwerke Lauchhammer AG

== Burials ==
- Prince-Bishop Przecław of Pogorzela, 1376
- Duke Henry VIII of Legnica, 1398
- Duke and Bishop Konrad IV the Elder, 1447
- Prince-Bishop Johann IV Roth, 1506
- Prince-Bishop Johann V Thurzo, 1520
- Maria Kazimiera Sobieska, granddaughter of Polish King John III Sobieski, 1723
- Prince-Bishop Count Palatine Francis Louis of Neuburg, 1732
- Protonotary apostolic Karol Milik, 1951
- Archbishop Bolesław Kominek, 1974
- Bishop Wincenty Urban, 1983
- Archbishop Adolf Bertram, 1991

== Gallery ==
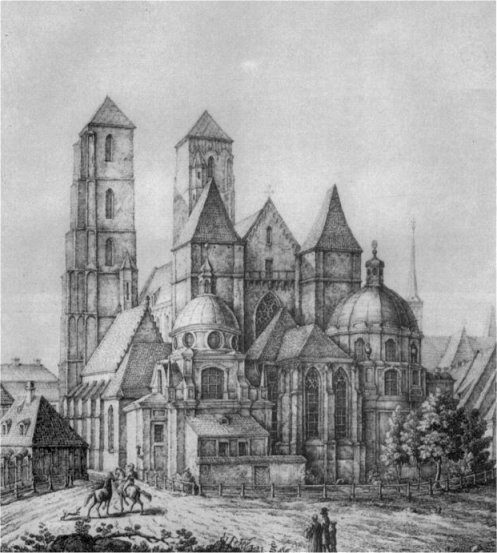
Eastern side of St. John Cathedral in Wrocław, 18th century

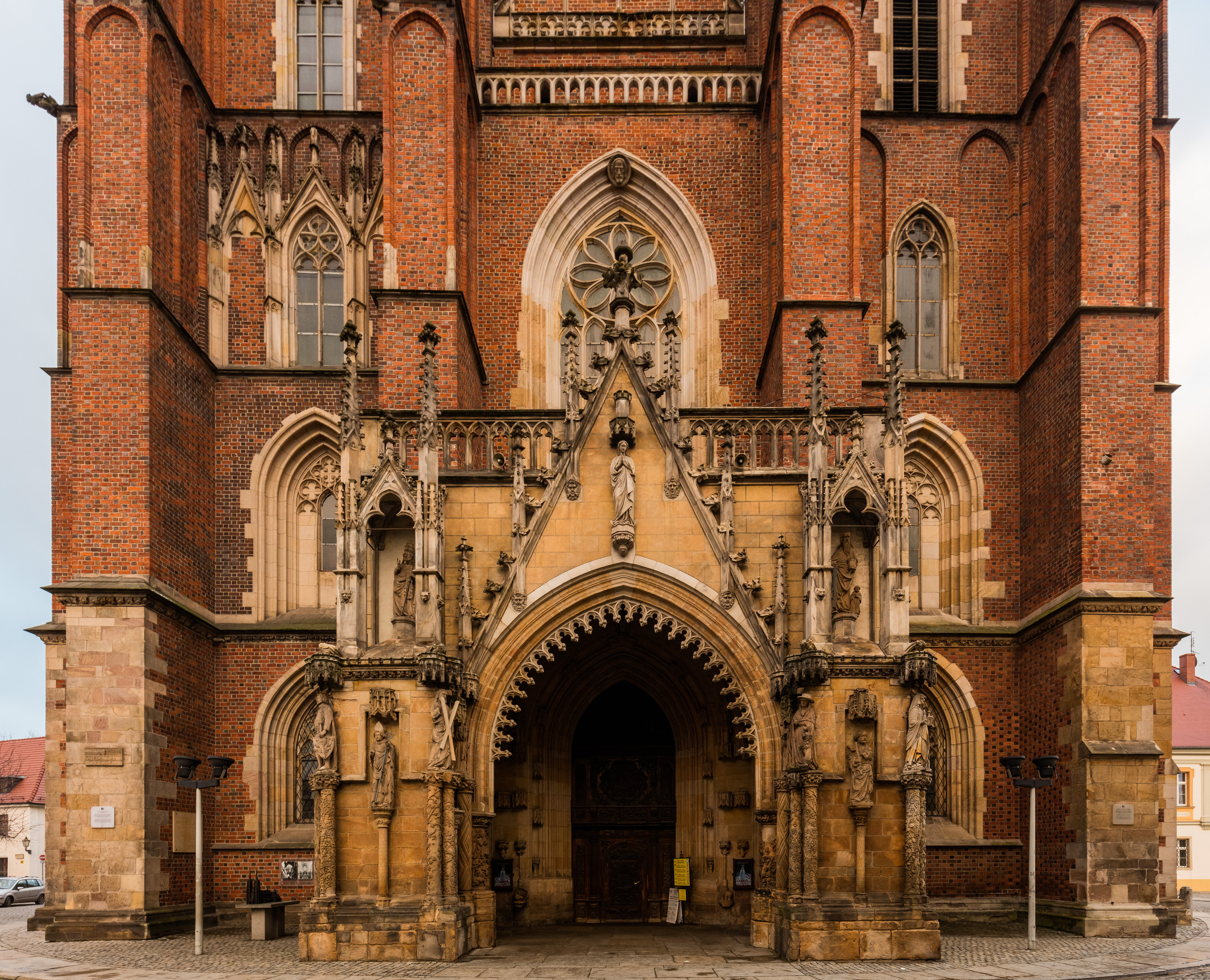
Main portal

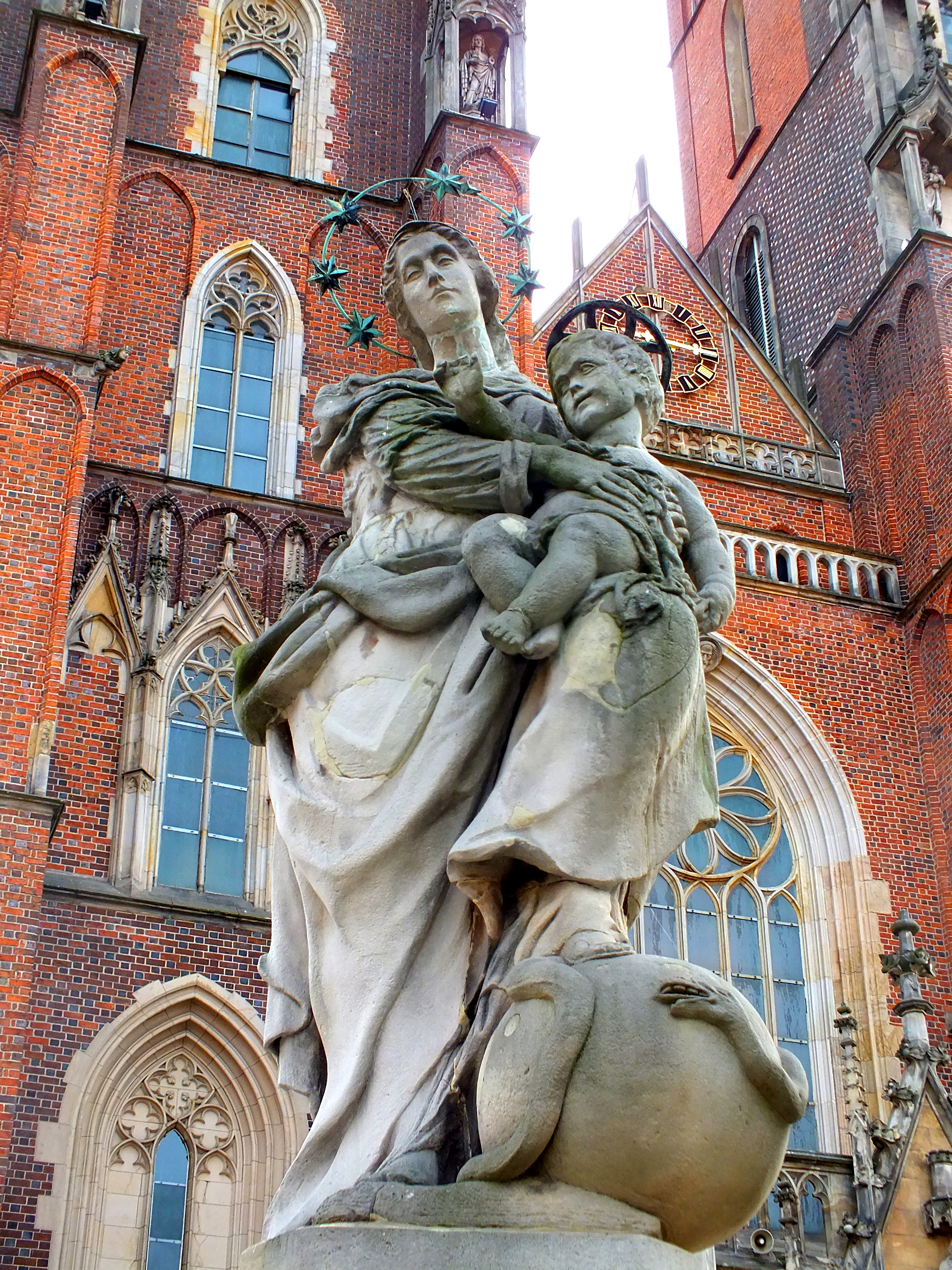
Statue of Madonna and Child at the Wroclaw Cathedral Square

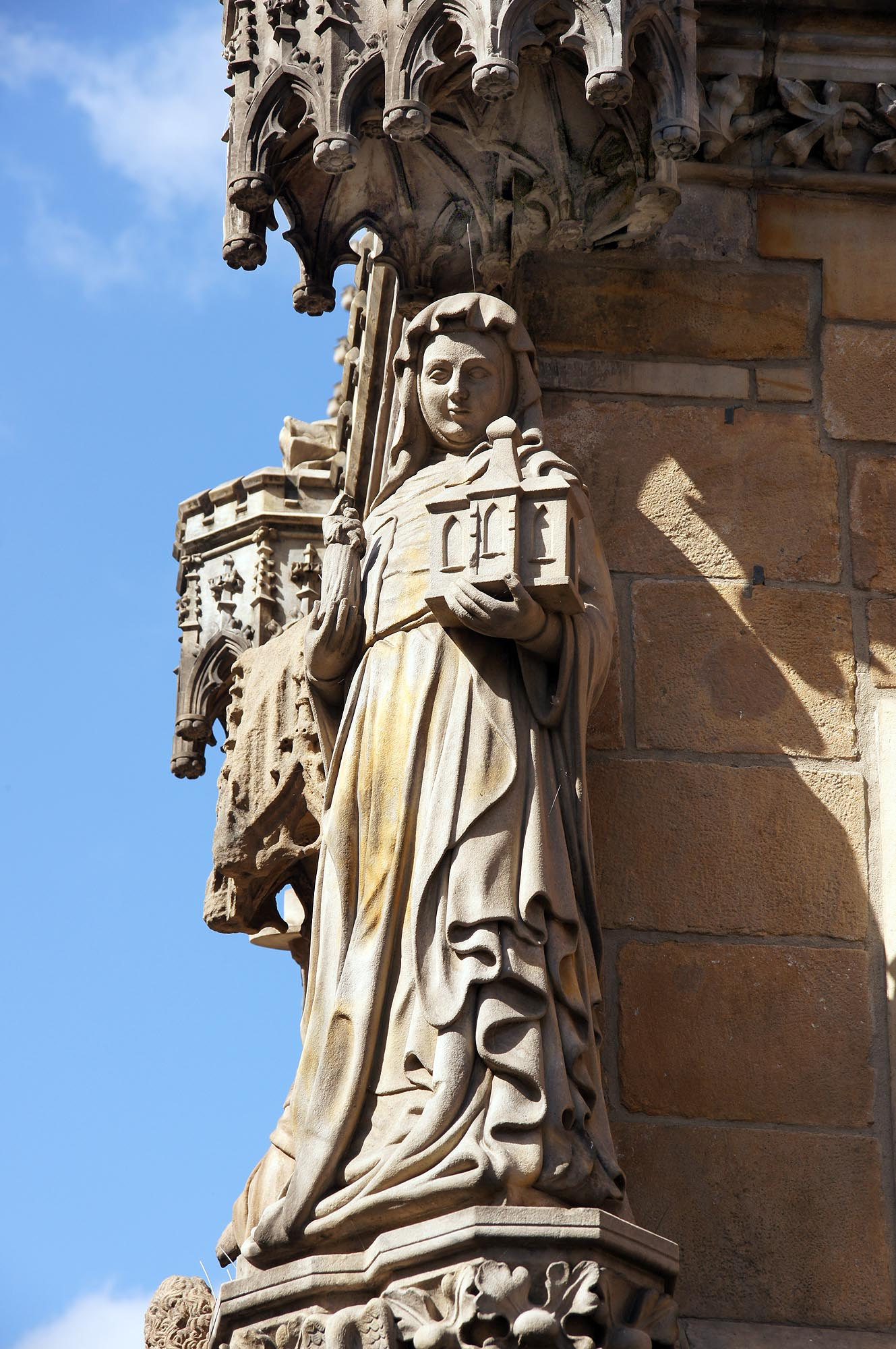
Architectural details at the entrance to the cathedral

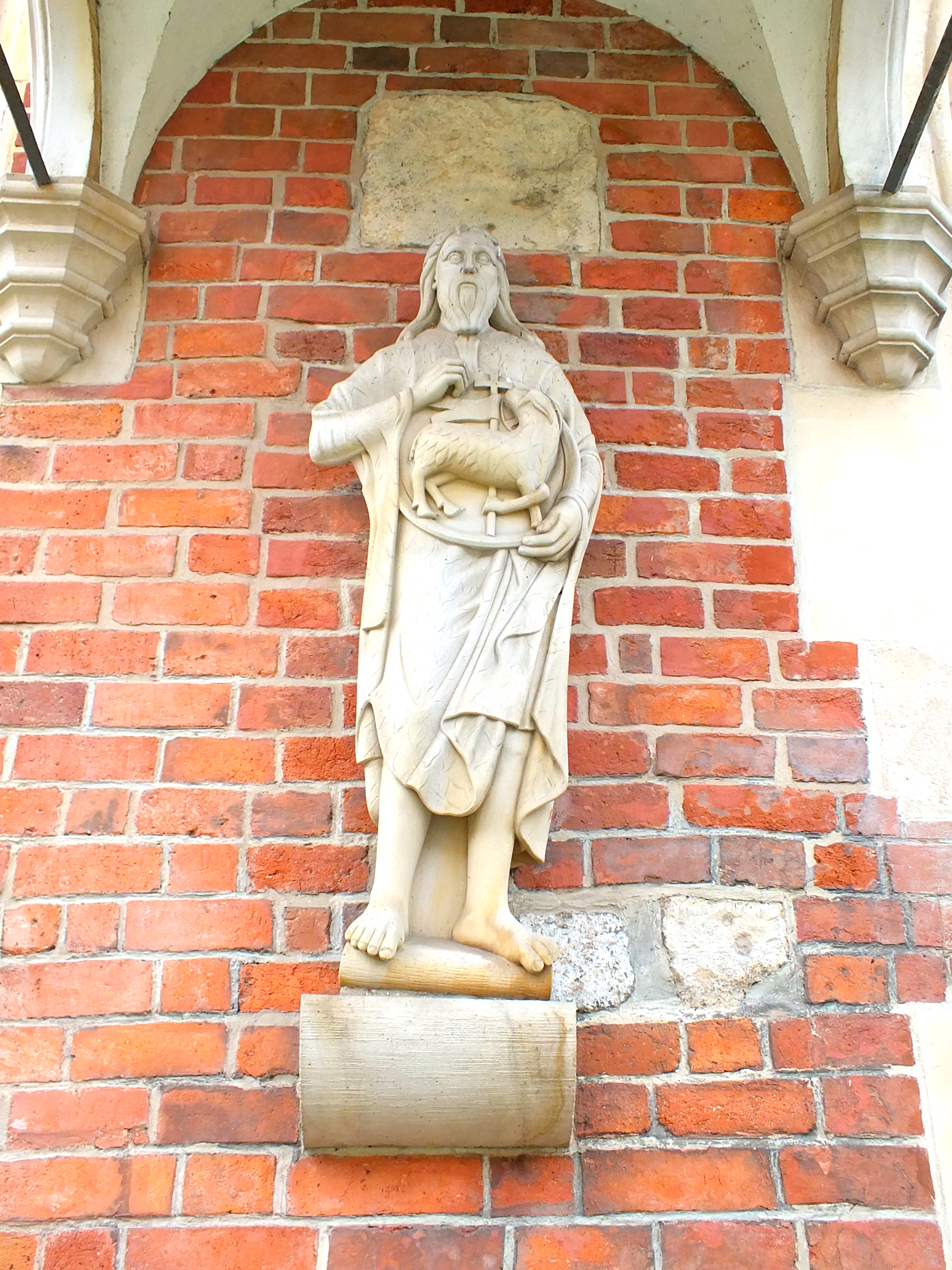
Architectural detail - statues of Saint John the Baptist

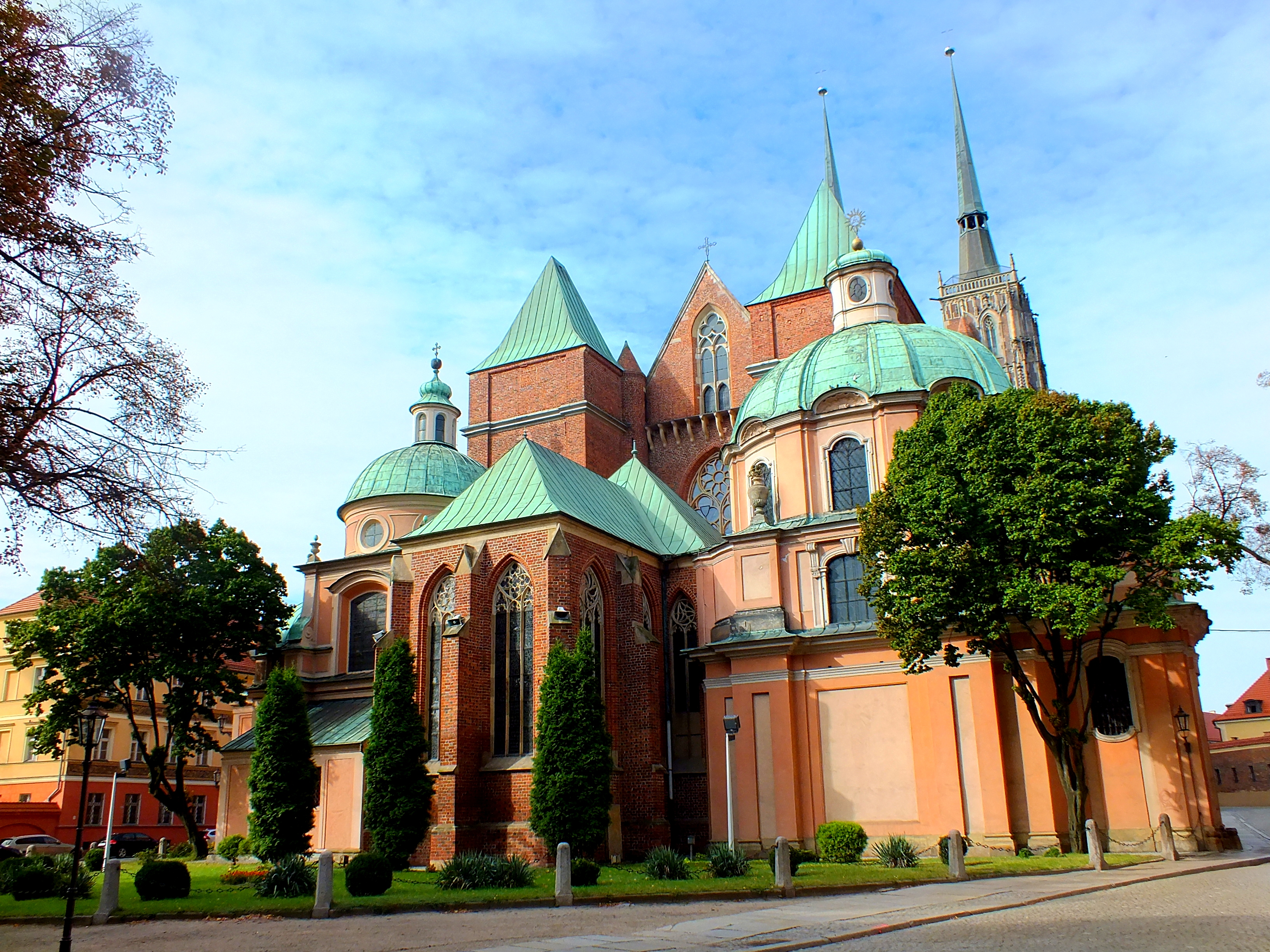
Rear view

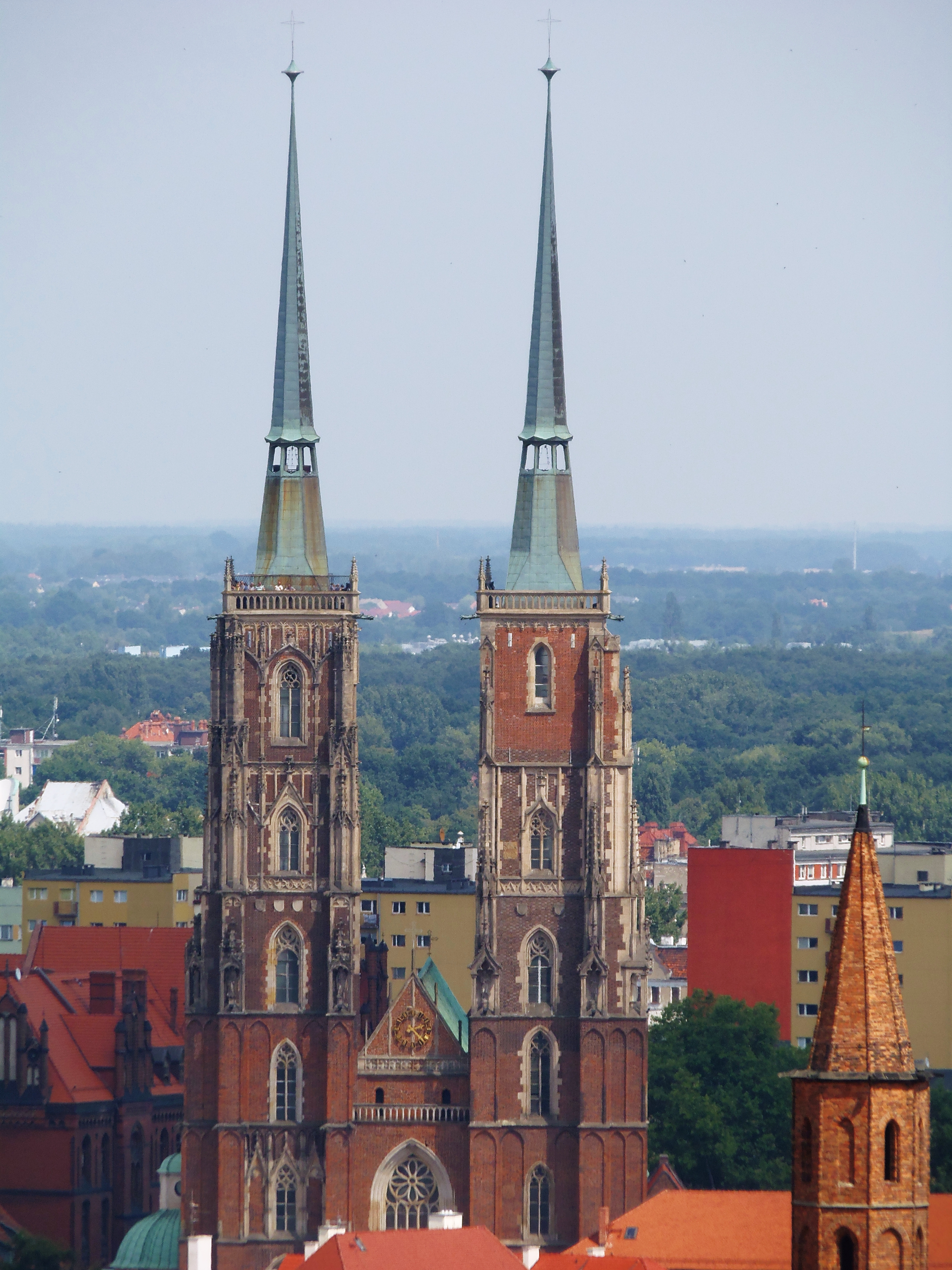
Cathedral towers

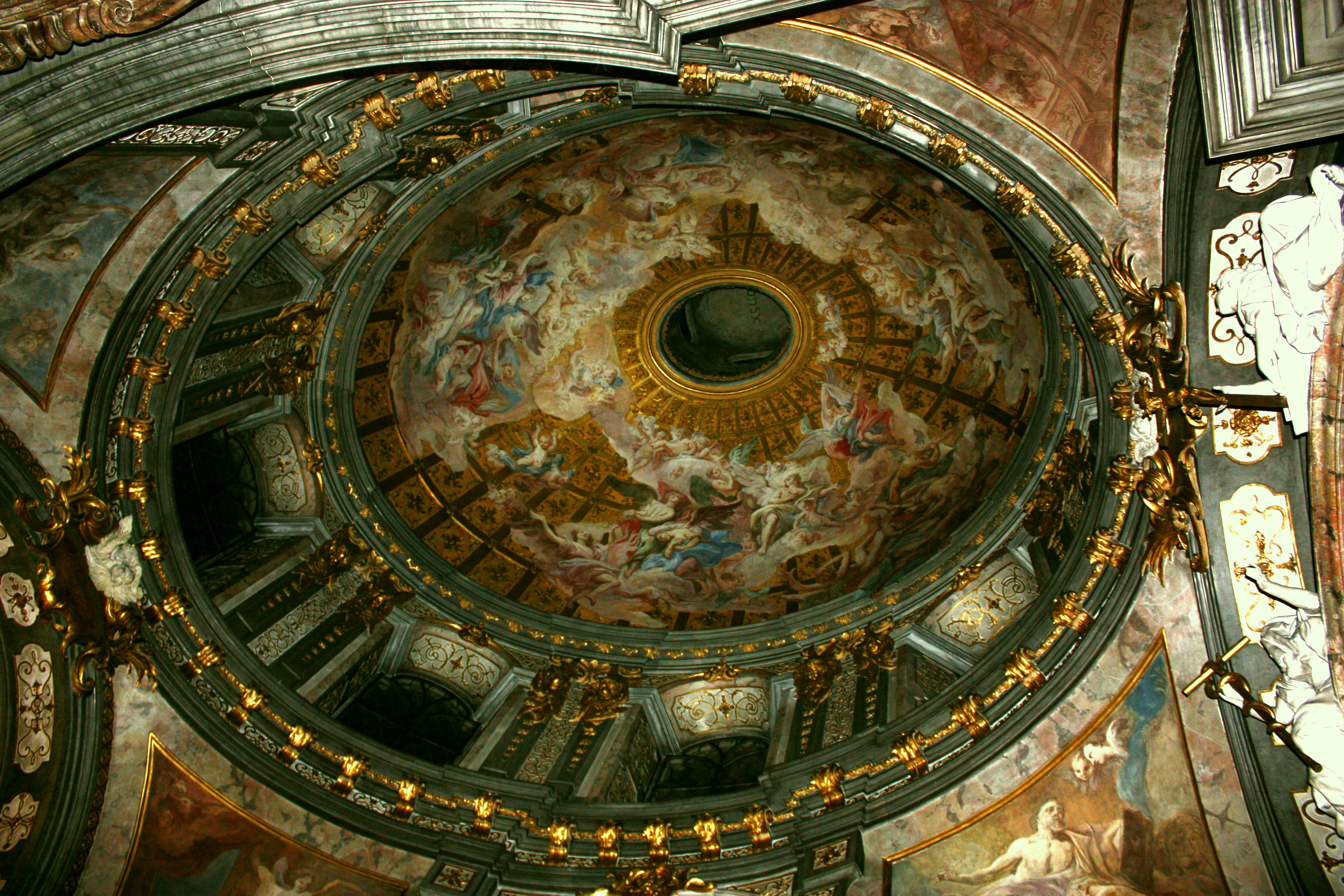
The dome of Corpus Christi Chapel

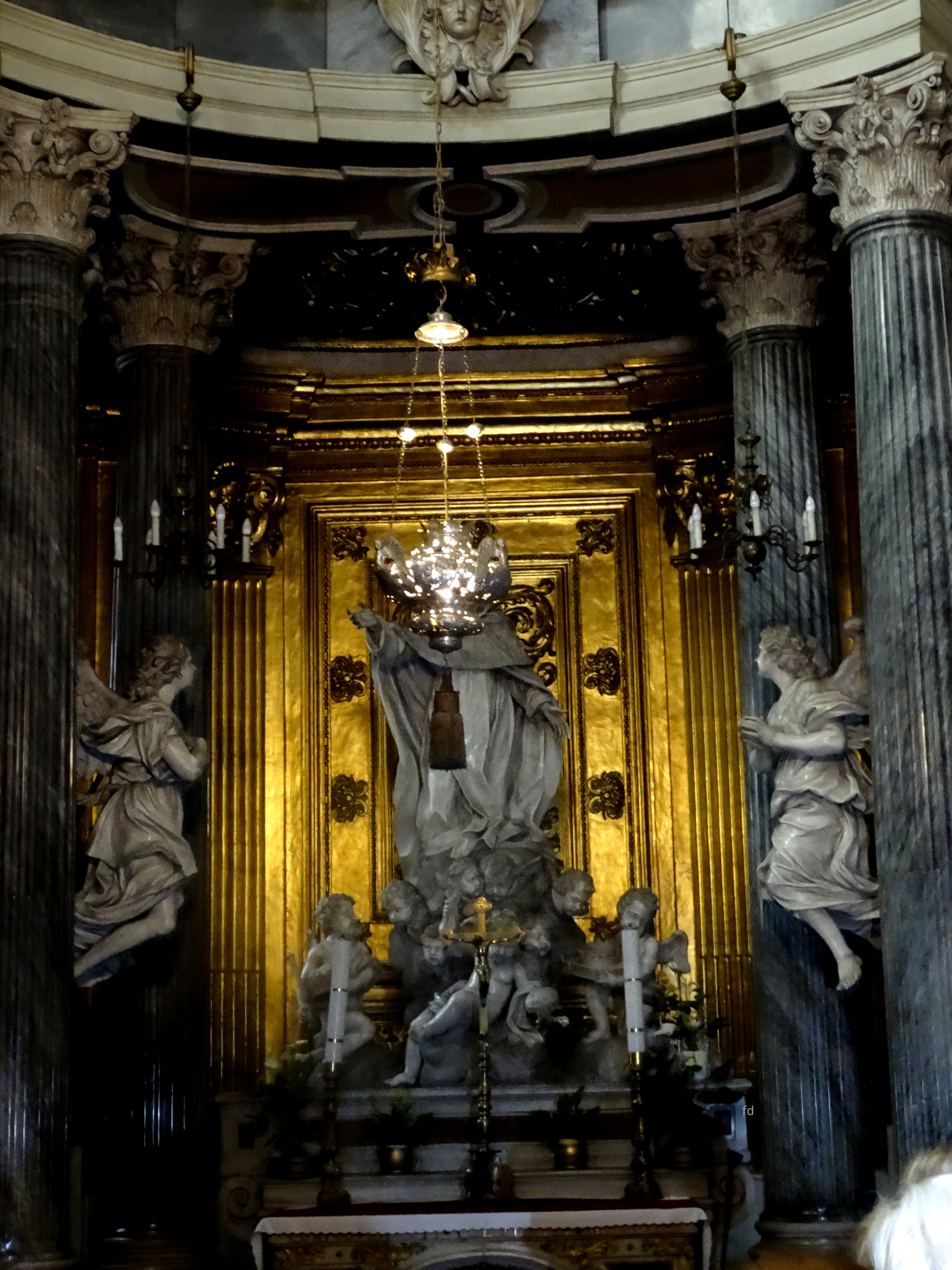
Baroque interior of the cathedral

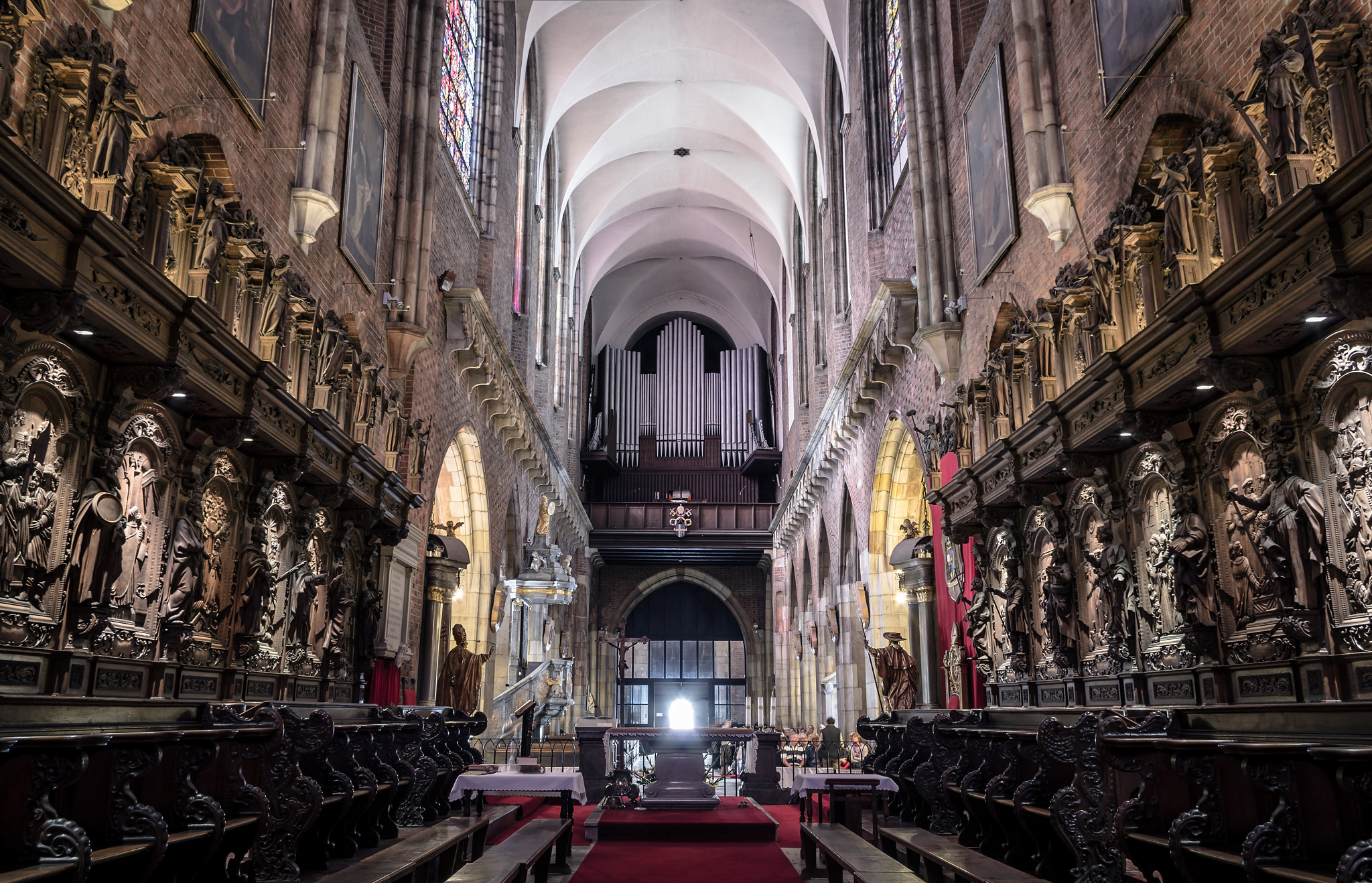
View towards the entrance

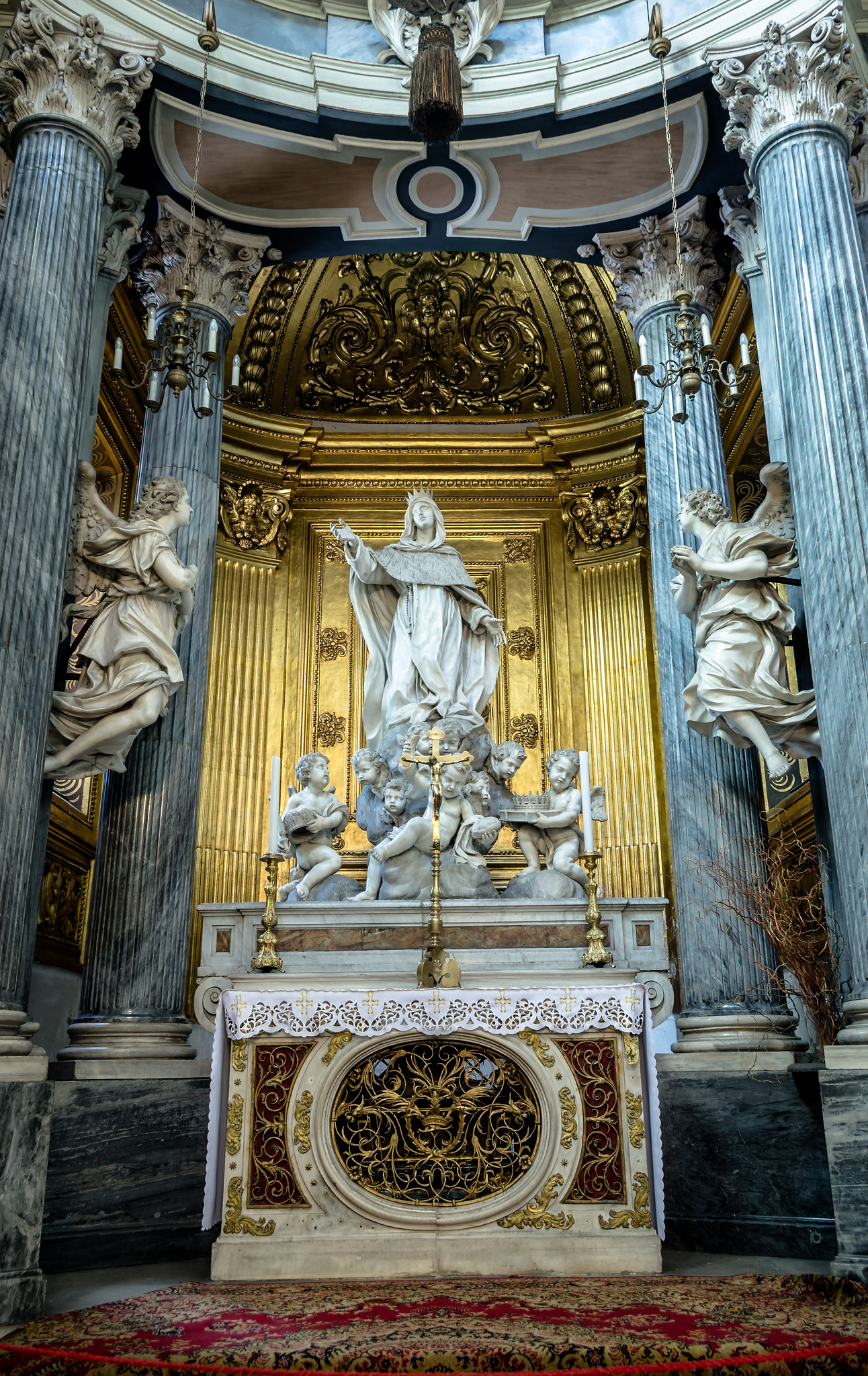
St. Elizabeth's Chapel

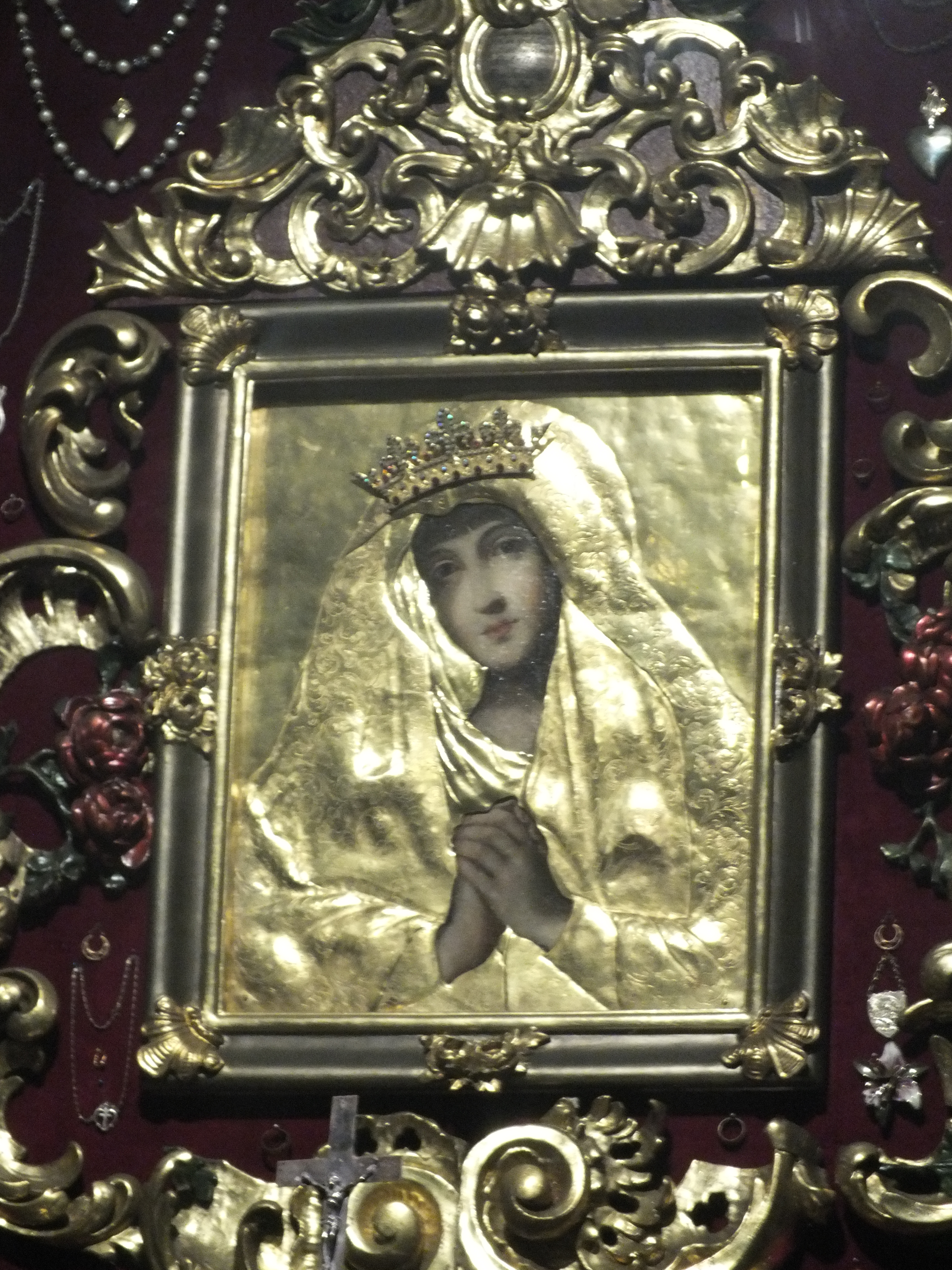
Mater Adoramus (Matka Boża Adorująca)

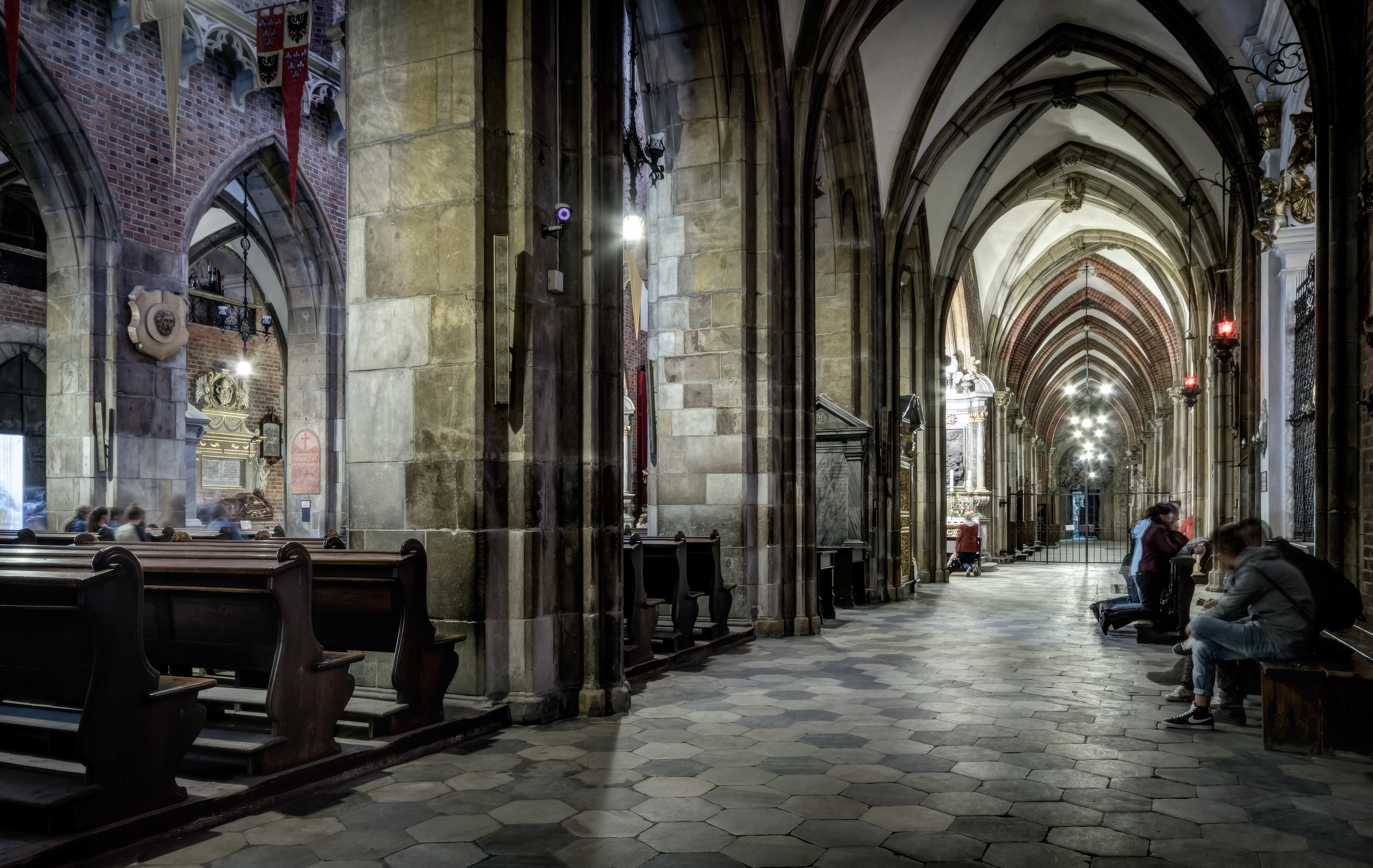
An aisle inside the cathedral

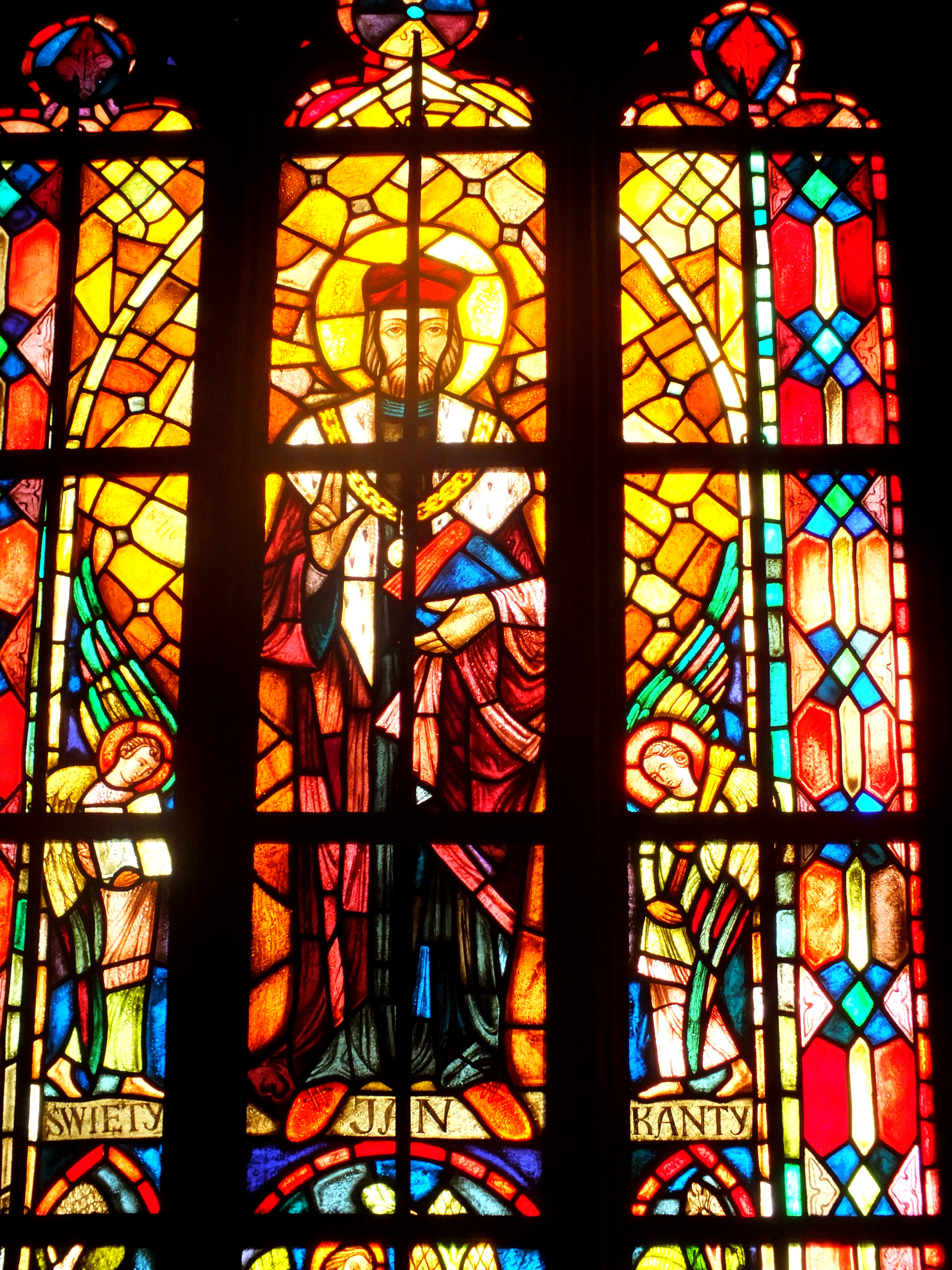
A stained glass window depicting Saint John Cantius

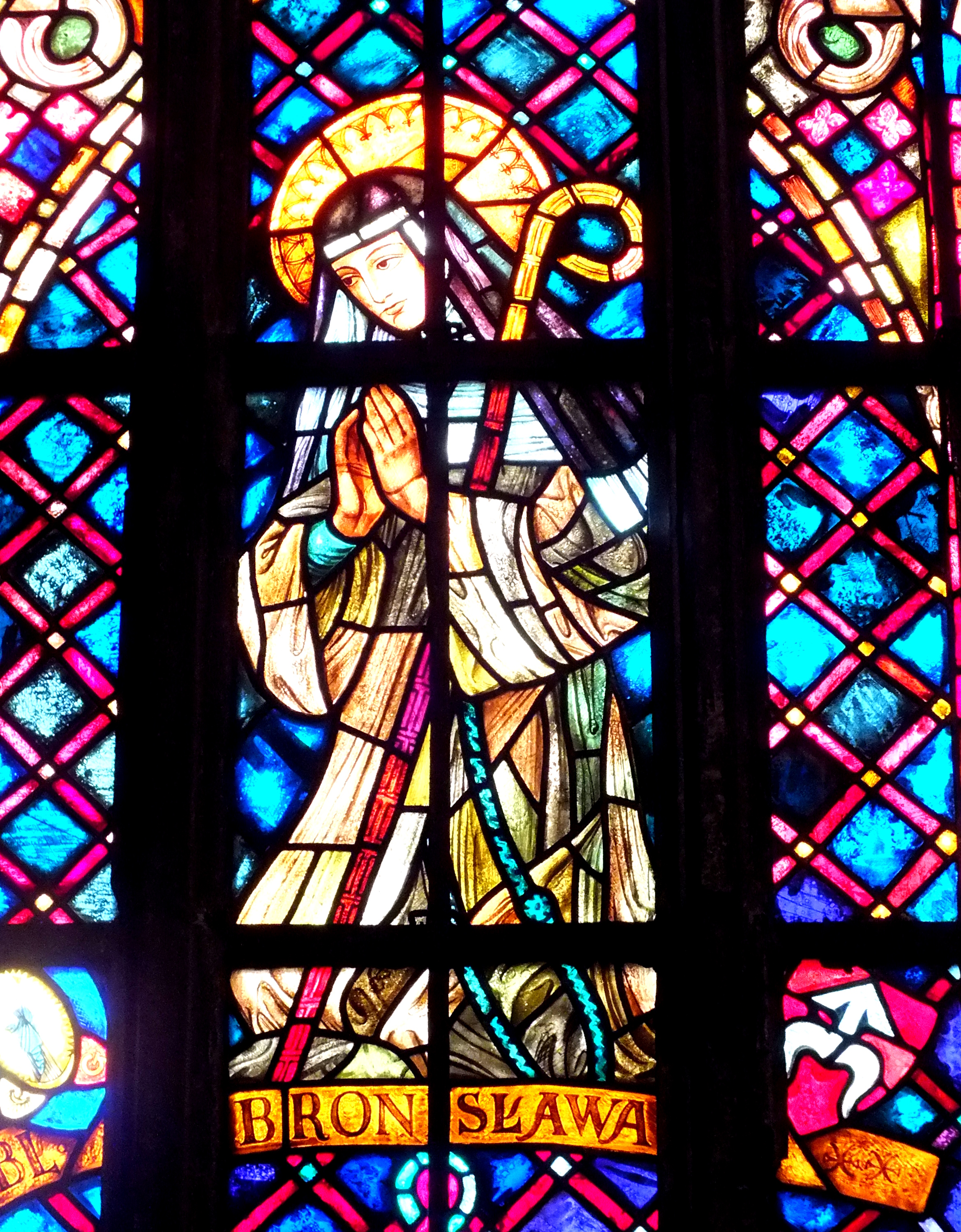
Stained glass blessed Bronislava

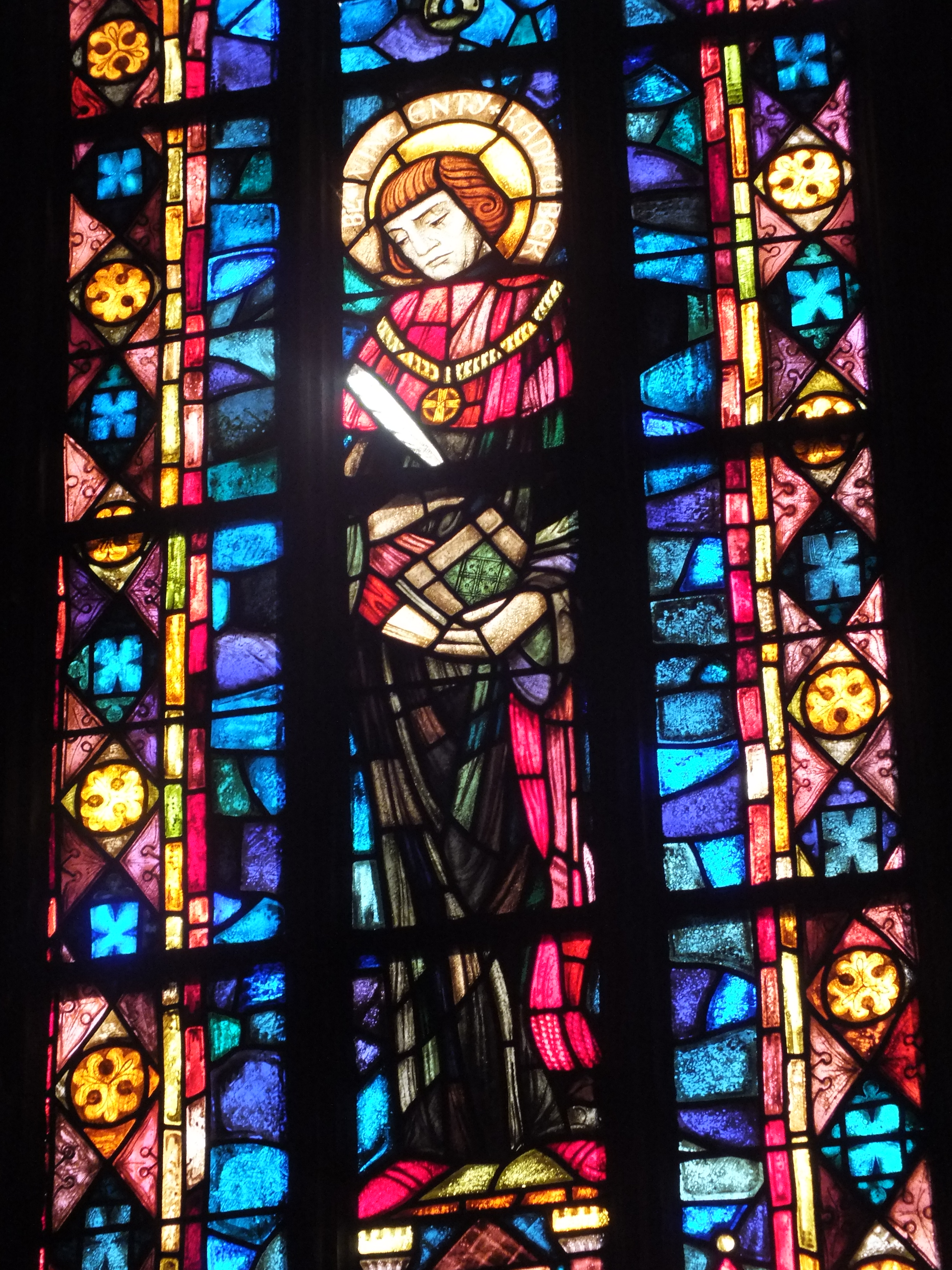
Stained glass blessed Wincenty Kadłubek

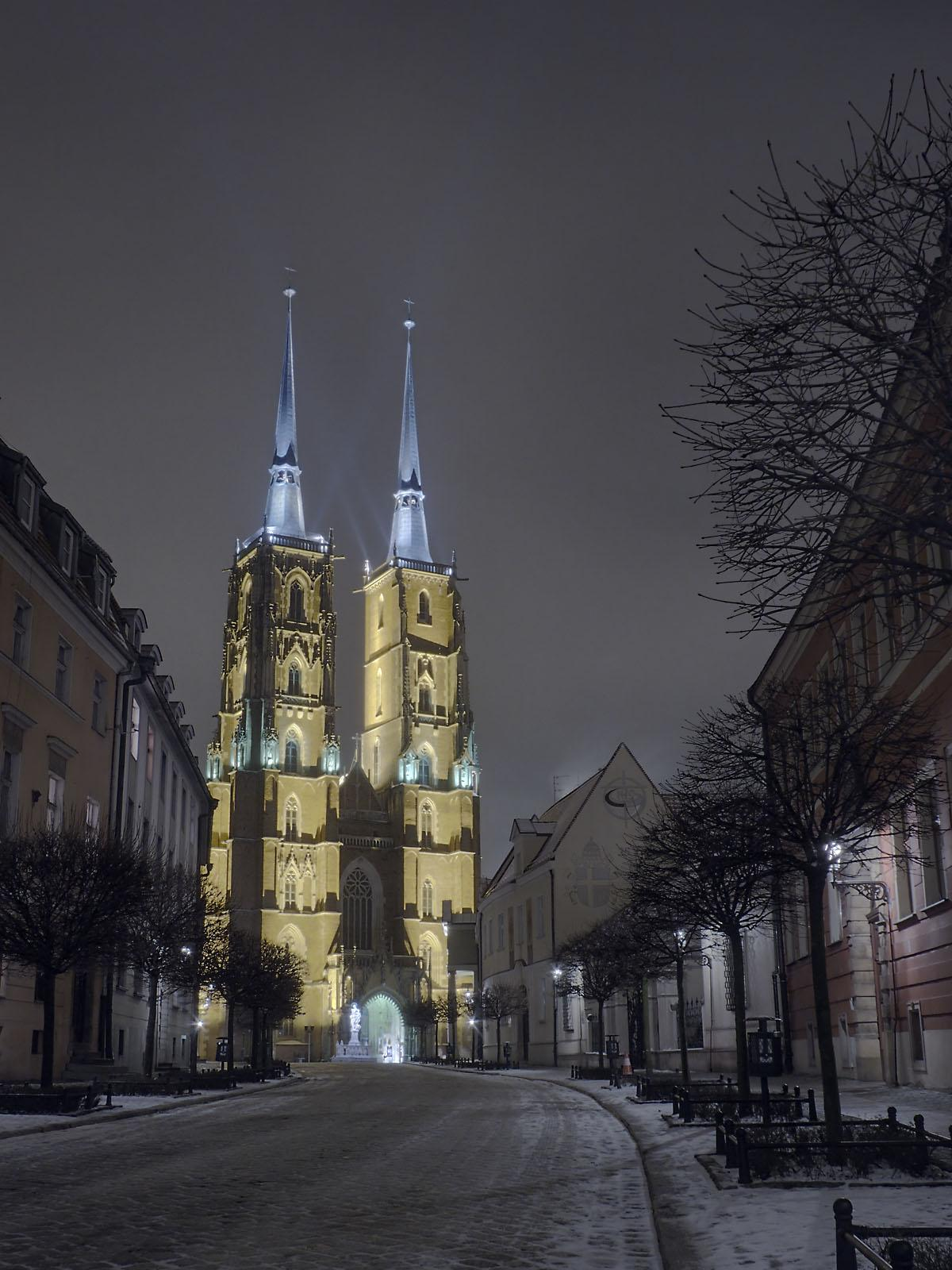
View of the cathedral in the evening

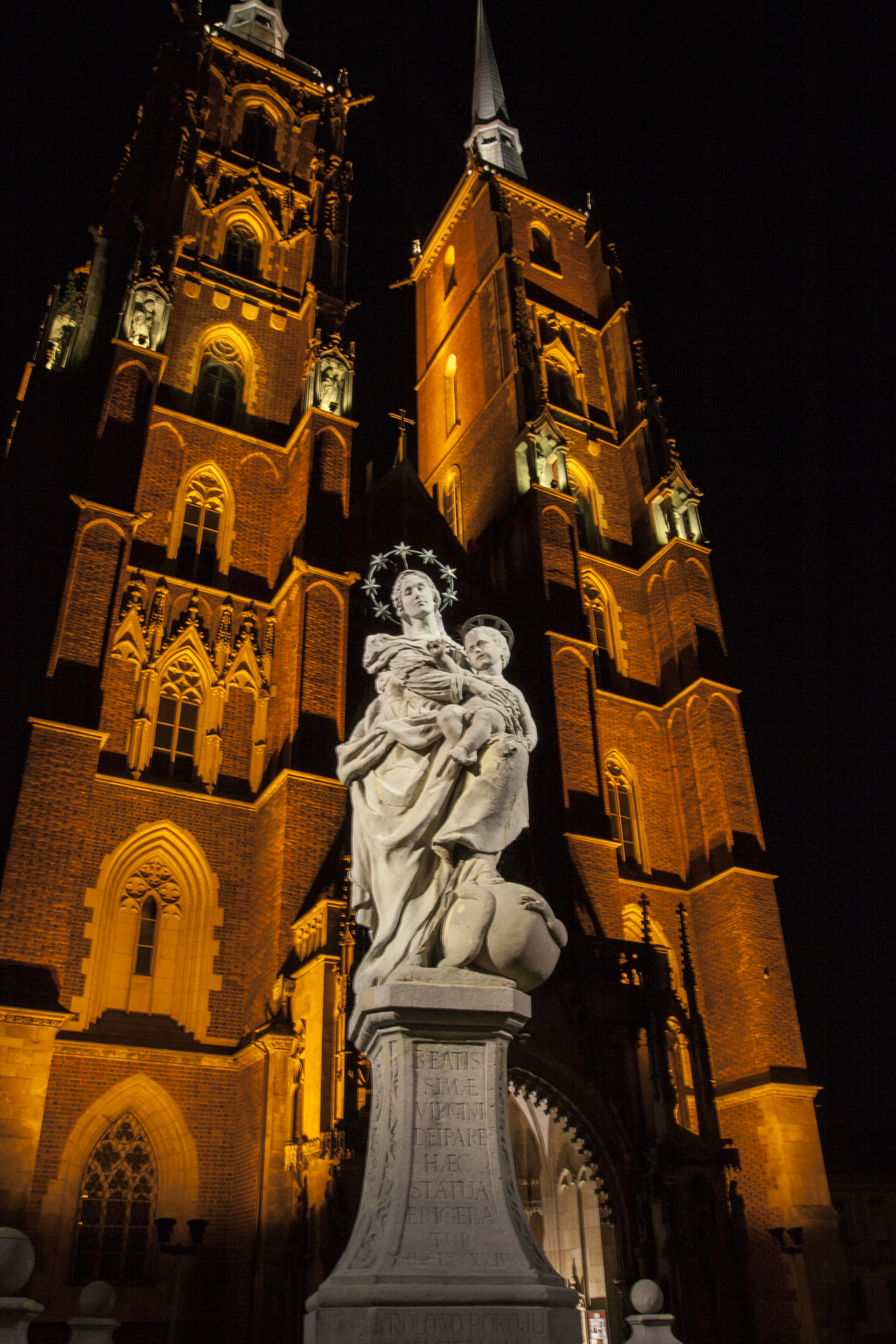
View of the cathedral at night

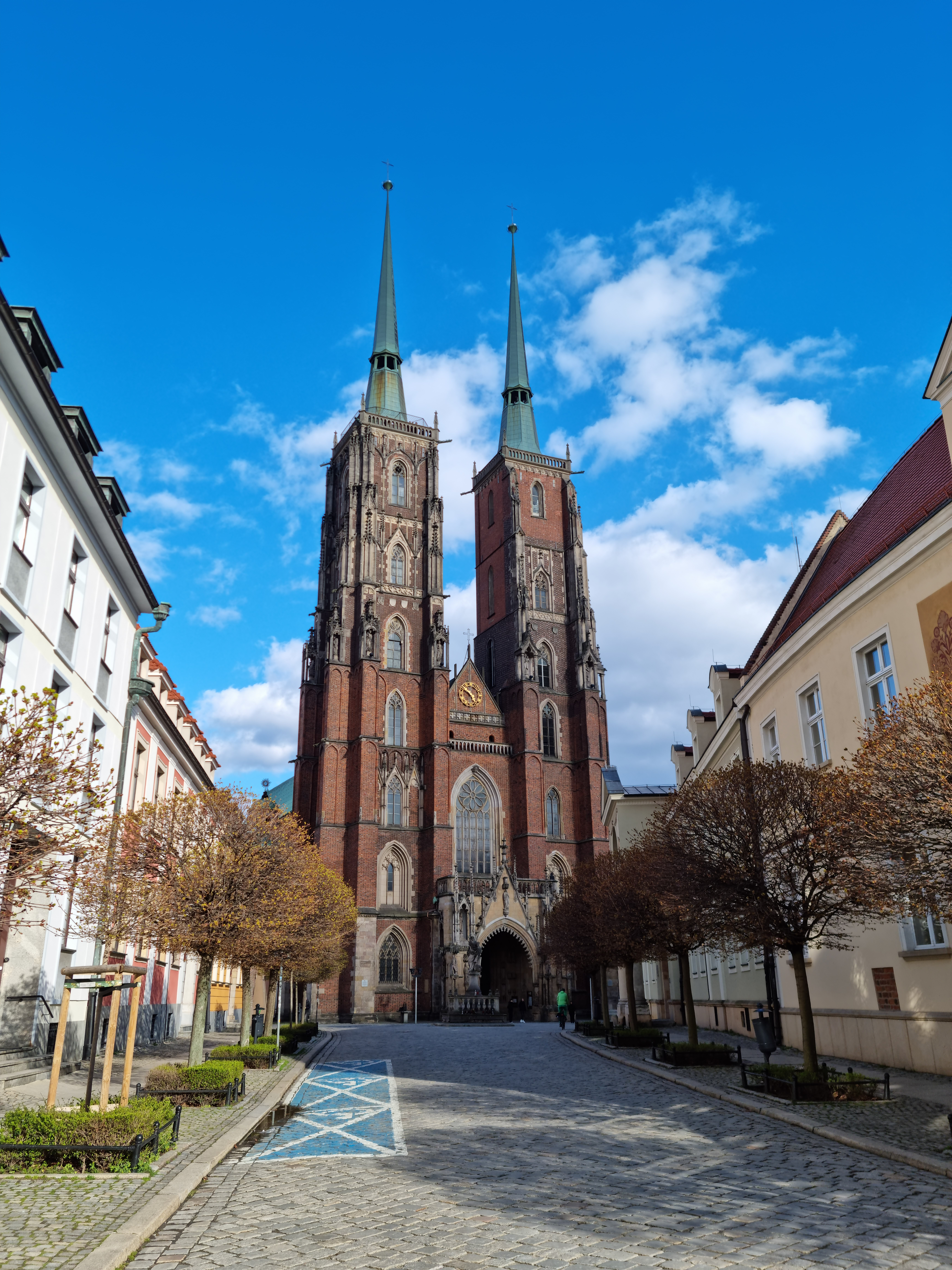
The Cathedral in 2023

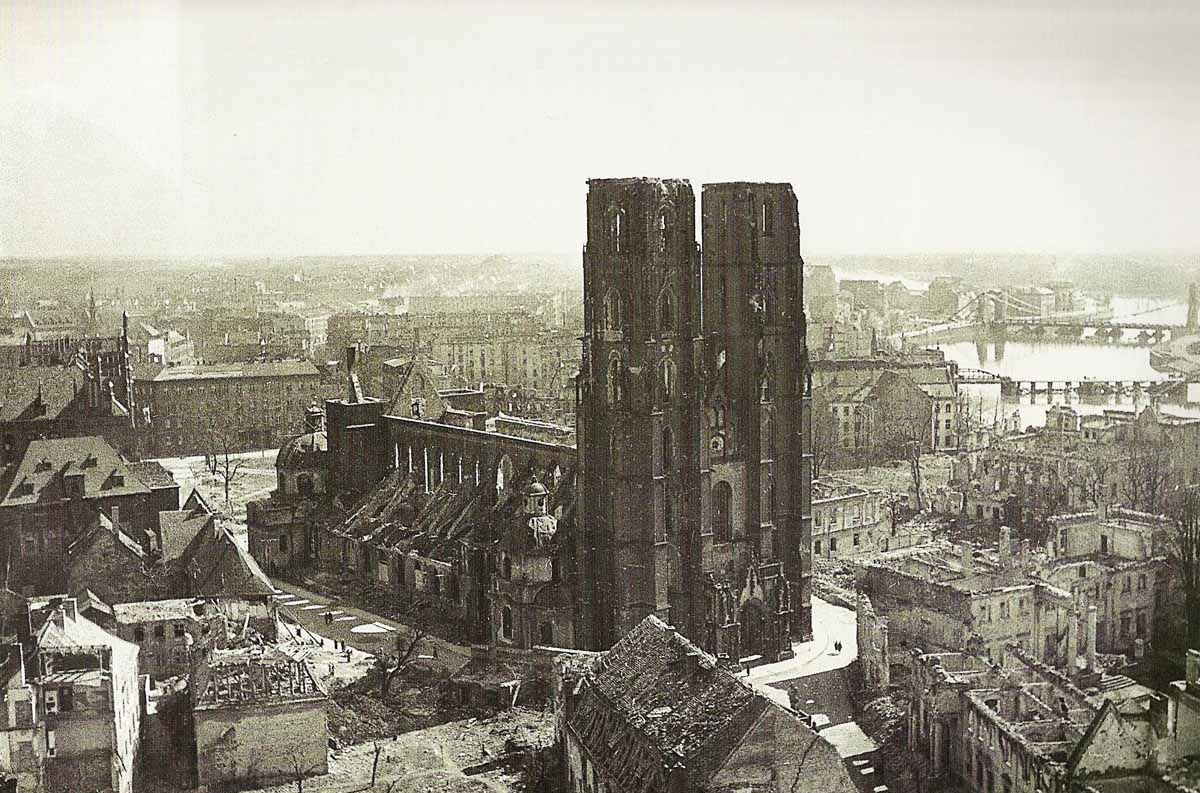
Surviving medieval structure of Wroclaw cathedral at the end of World War II

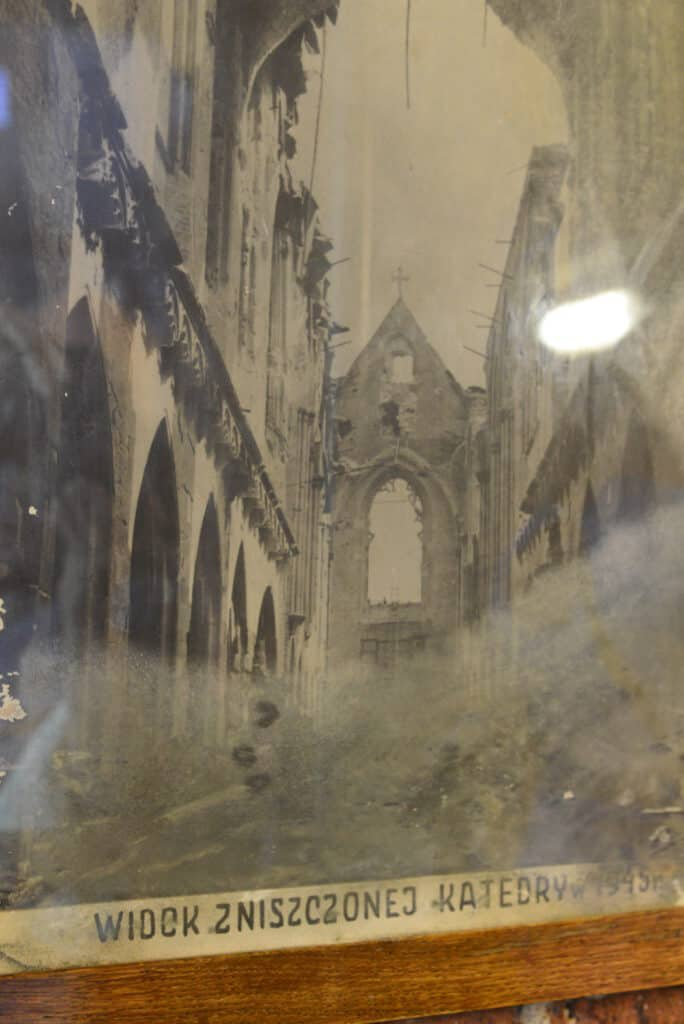
Interior of the surviving structure of Wroclaw cathedral in 1945 shortly after the siege of Breslau

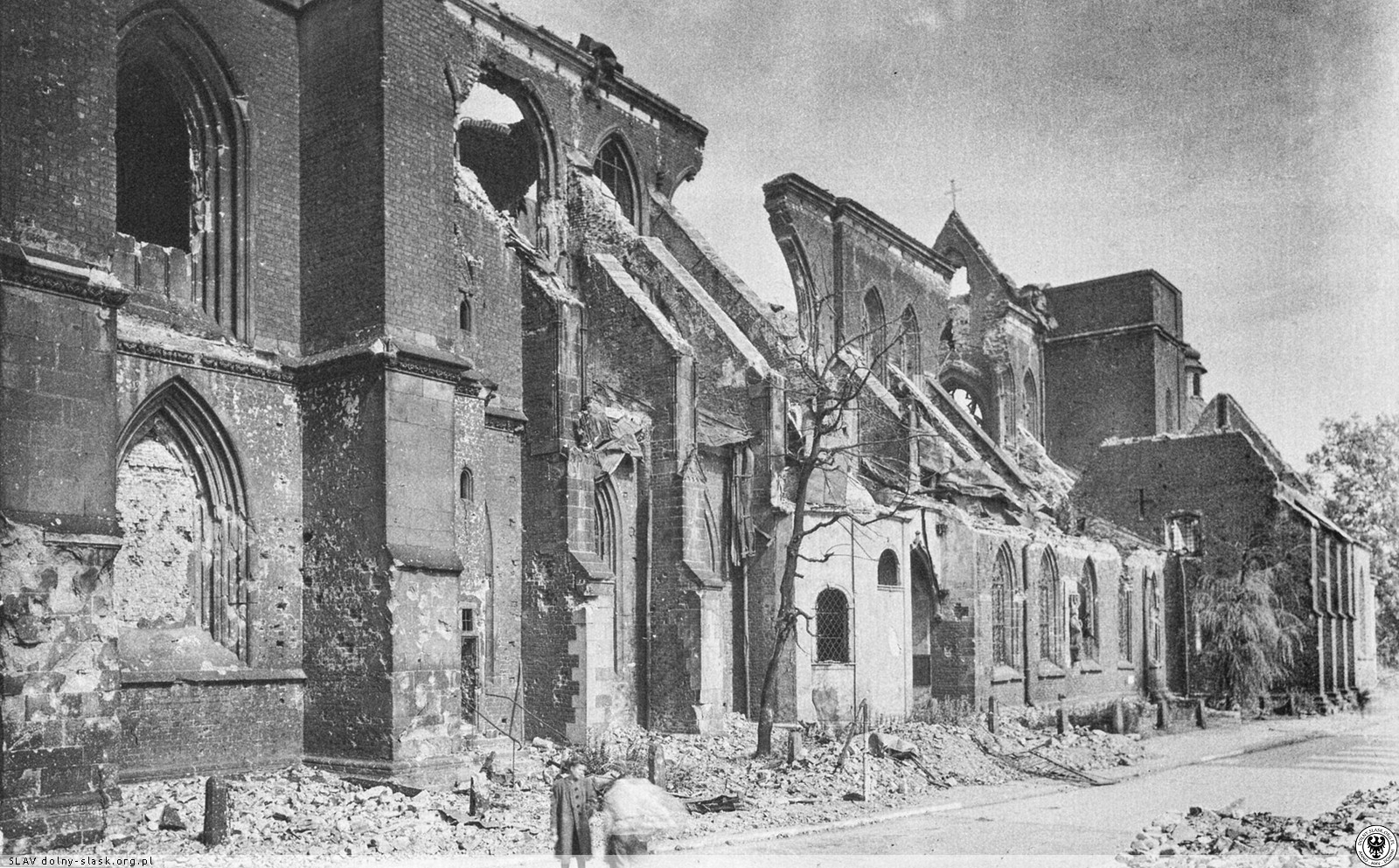
Exterior of Wroclaw cathedral in 1945

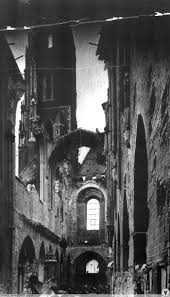
Towers and medieval interiors of Wroclaw cathedral in 1945

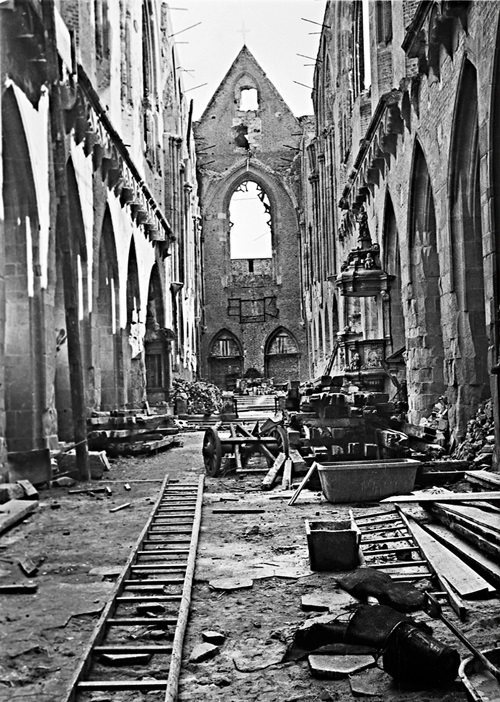
Nave of Wroclaw cathedral in 1945

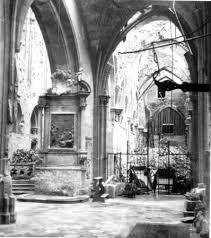
Surviving artworks in one of the Naves in Wroclaw cathedral.

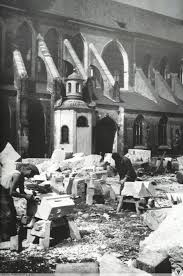
Restoration and reconstruction works in Wroclaw cathedral circa 1949

== See also ==
- Wrocław archdiocese
- Church of St Mary on the Sand
