= Królowe Stojło =

- Village
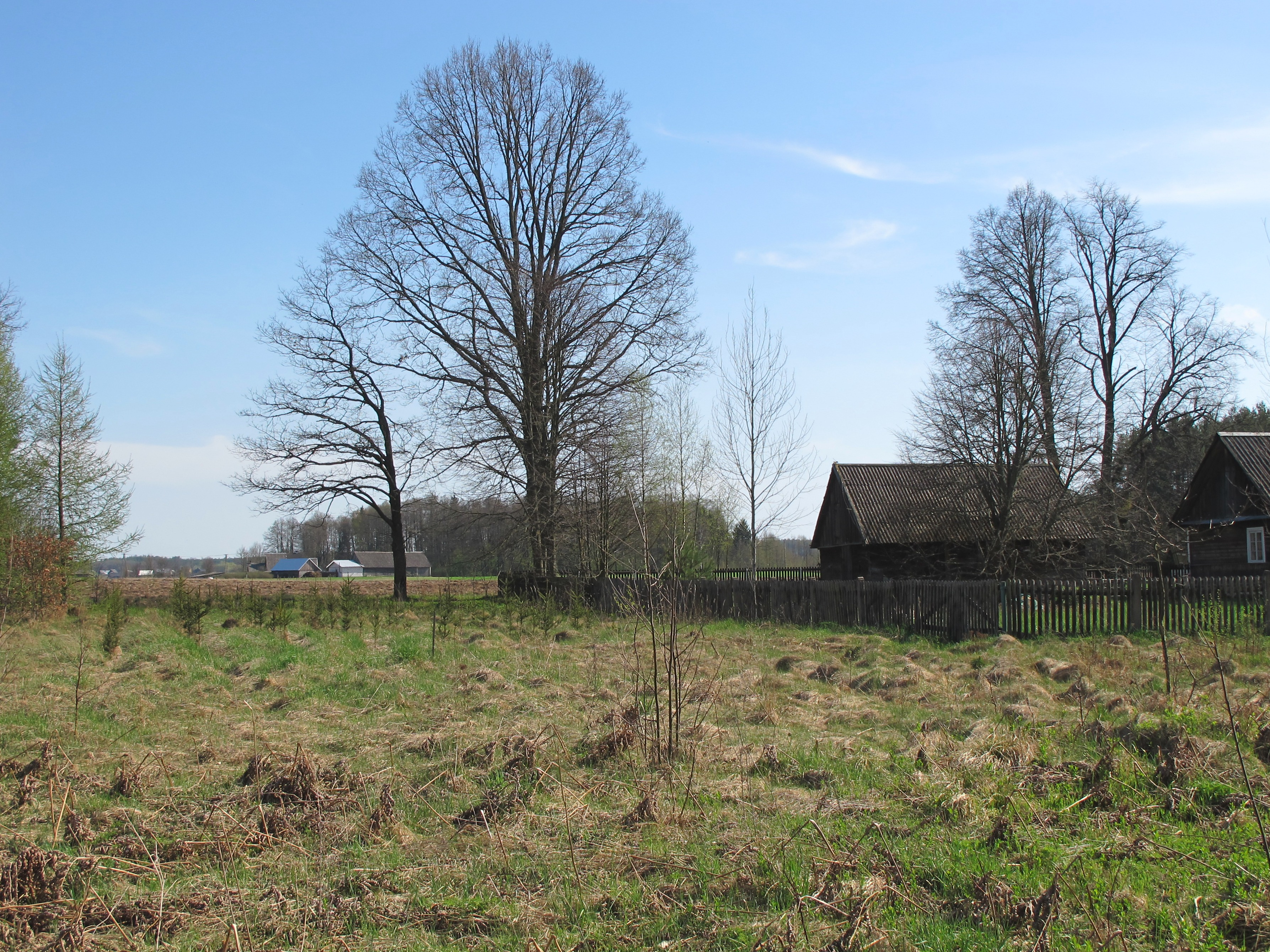
- View of Królowe Stojło, commune of Gródek

- Coat of arms

- Location within Poland
- Coordinates: 53°08′31″N 23°37′20″E
- Country: Poland
- Voivodeship: Podlaskie
- County: Białystok
- Gmina: Gródek

Królowe Stojło [kruˈlɔvɛ ˈstɔi̯wɔ] is a village in the administrative district of Gmina Gródek, within Białystok County, Podlaskie Voivodeship, in north-eastern Poland, close to the border with Belarus.
