= Chudów =

- Village
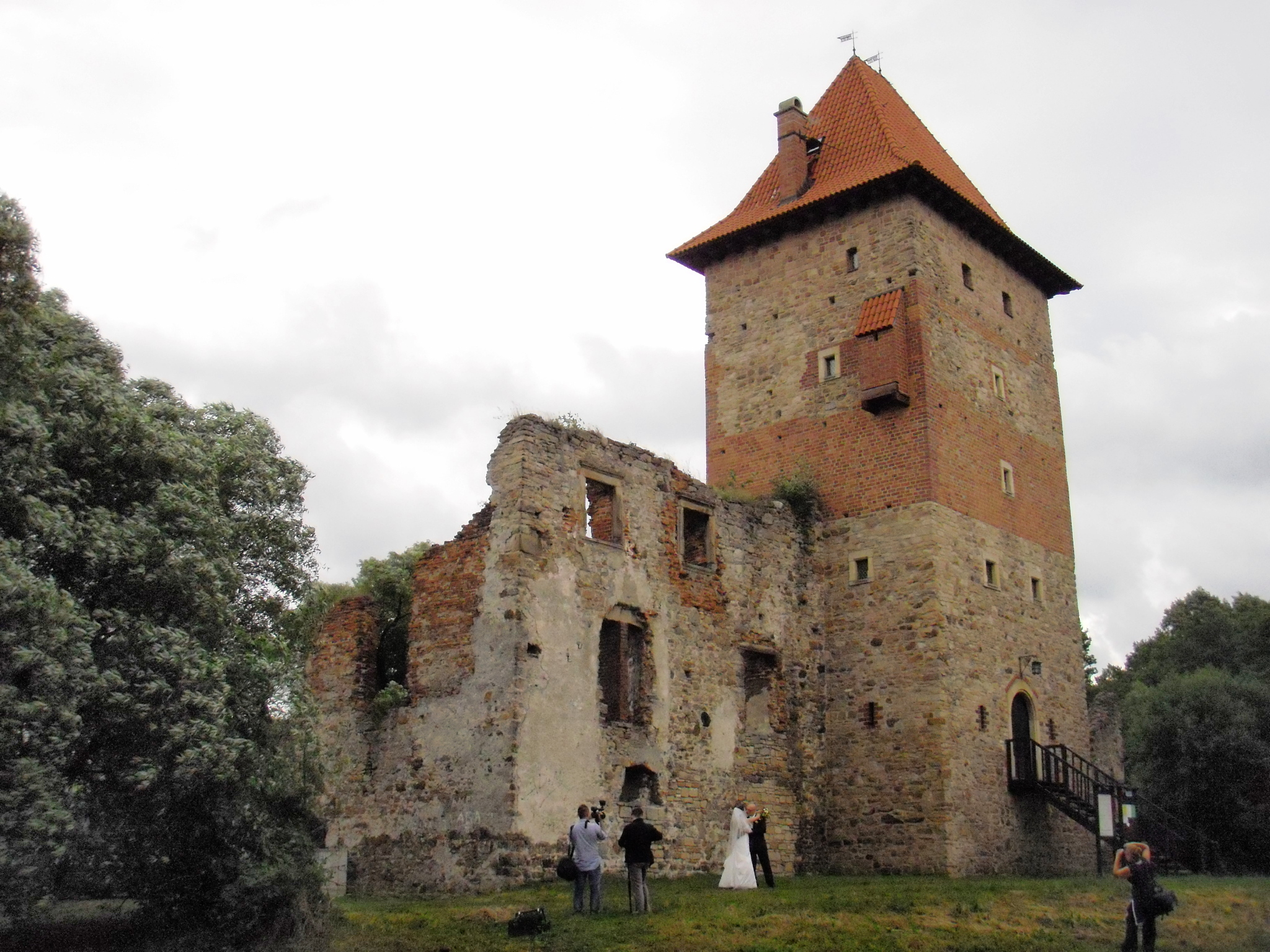
- Chudów Castle ruins, constructed after 1532

- Coat of arms

- Location within Poland
- Coordinates: 50°13′0″N 18°47′0″E
- Country: Poland
- Voivodeship: Silesian
- County: Gliwice
- Gmina: Gierałtowice
- Population (2022): 1,807
- Website: Chudów

Chudów ([ˈxuduf], German: Chudow, Chutow) is a village in Poland, situated in Gliwice County within the municipality of Gmina Gierałtowice, Silesian Voivodeship, in the historical region of Silesia.

From 1945 to 1954, Chudów served as the seat of the Chudów commune. Between 1954 and 1972, it was part of—and the administrative seat of—the Chudów district. From 1975 to 1998, the village was administratively included in the Katowice Voivodeship.

== History ==
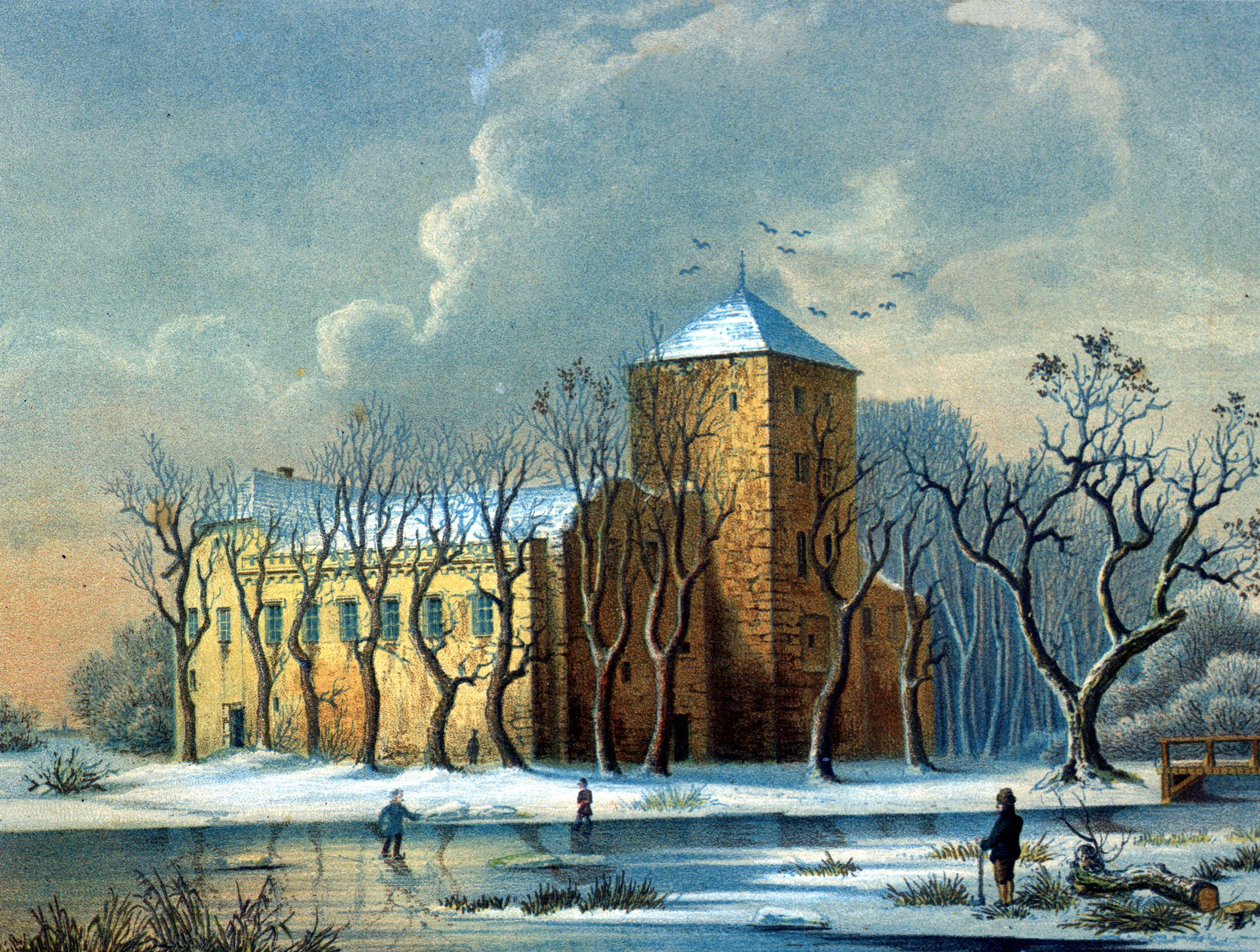
Original 19th-century illustration of Chudów (Chutow) Castle, created on location by German publisher Alexander Duncker between 1859 and 1860

The village was first mentioned between 1295 and 1305 as Cudow, attested in the Latin manuscript Liber fundationis episcopatus Vratislaviensis (Tithe Register of the Roman Catholic Archdiocese of Breslau). In 1466, it appeared under the name Chudorf. Over the centuries, Chudów—located in the historical and geographical region of Silesia, specifically Upper Silesia—has undergone numerous shifts in political control, sovereignty, and cultural identity.

From its early history, the region formed part of Great Moravia and the Duchy of Bohemia. It later transitioned from Polish rule under Mieszko I and the Duchy of Silesia to the Lands of the Bohemian Crown within the Holy Roman Empire, eventually forming the Duchies of Upper and Lower Silesia under Habsburg rule. In time, it became the Province of Silesia under German Prussian administration. After World War I, the region was divided between Weimar Germany and the newly re-established Second Polish Republic. Following World War II, most of the territory was transferred to Poland.

These transitions reflect the region's strategic significance, the shifting political landscape, and the evolving cultural influences of Central Europe. Over the centuries, the village has been known by various names, including Cudow, Hudow, Chudoba, Khudow, Kudow, Chudow, Chutow, and finally Chudów. Historically, the main strategic route from the city of Breslau to the former Polish capital of Kraków passed through the Chudów dominion.

=== 15th century ===
According to historical sources, the earliest confirmed owner of Chudów was the nobleman Johannes de Hodow, who is recorded as serving as a judge on 15 October 1434. He acted as a representative of Wenceslaus I, Duke of Cieszyn, in the dispute between Silesia and Jagiellonian-ruled Poland. Documents from 1459 mention the nobleman Jan Sudiss von Khodow as the owner of the rural village estate during the period when Chudów was part of the Duchy of Bytom. In 1483, the nobleman Mikulasz Chudowsky is also recorded as the owner.

Archaeological research suggests that by the 15th century, a timber, tower-like fortified structure (Keep), resembling a motte castle, stood on a small elevated island—partially enlarged through artificial means—measuring approximately 30 to 40 metres in diameter. The island was encircled by a moat reinforced with fascines, providing an additional layer of defence. The tower, which functioned both as a defensive structure and a residence, was encircled by a palisade and further reinforced around the island's perimeter with a stockade. A section of these fortifications was uncovered during earlier archaeological investigations. The tower was likely destroyed by fire around the turn of the 15th and 16th centuries, although some sources suggest the event occurred earlier, in the first half of the 15th century.

=== 16th to 17th century ===
In 1532, the domain of Chudów became an allodial estate under the ownership of the House of Saszowski (a later Slavicized form of the name, with Latinized and Germanic variants recorded as de Scassowe or von Schassowe (Note: Throughout the medieval period, deeds and land records reveal a fluid orthography in the naming of this Roman-German noble family. The name circulated in parallel across German- and Slavic-speaking regions: Latinized and Germanic forms such as de Schassowe, von Schassowe, de Scassowe, von Schassow, and de Schassow appear in German contexts, while Slavic variants like Schassowski, Sassowsky, Saschowsky, and Schaschowsky emerged in Slavic-speaking areas of the Margraviate of Lusatia, and in Polish-speaking regions of Silesia and Greater Poland. Over time, the name stabilized into fully Slavicized forms—Szaszowski or Saszowski—in Polish regions, while Germanic variants such as von Schassowe persisted in German-speaking lands.))—a knightly noble family of Roman-German origin that had expanded into, and firmly established itself within, the Duchy of Greater Poland and the Duchies of Silesia during the early 14th century, under the reign of King Wenceslaus II of Bohemia. Bearing the Saszor coat of arms, the family came to be recognised as one of the most eminent and affluent noble lineages in the Silesian duchies. Among their many holdings, they already possessed the neighbouring estate village of Gierałtowice.

Chudów is renowned for its imposing 16th-century Renaissance stone castle, which replaced the fortified timber castle keep erected by the 15th century. This transformation was initiated by the nobleman and scion Jan Saszowski von Geraltowitz—also known as Jan Geraltowsky in German and Jan Gierałtowski in Polish. The castle was constructed in at least two distinct phases. The initial structure—a fortified, multi-storey tower with a barrel-vaulted basement—was integrated into the perimeter of the stone castle walls. Later, a master residential wing was added on the southeast side, and a rectangular service building was erected on the northwest, either simultaneously or shortly thereafter. The presence of heating devices on two of the tower's upper floors suggests these levels were originally used for residential purposes. All interiors, except for the basement and entrance level, were originally plastered. The tower was likely crowned with timber hoarding supported by corbels, traces of which remain visible as holes in the masonry.

The master residential wing, located in the southeastern part of the castle and rectangular in plan, comprised three floors, including a top storey built into the roof space. The lower level was covered by a barrel vault and divided into three rooms. The northeasternmost room—the northernmost part of this wing—housed the kitchen; remnants of pillars, likely supporting the stove's hood, along with a stone gutter used to drain kitchen waste, have been preserved. One of the ground-floor rooms was vaulted perpendicular to the building's axis and accessed from the courtyard near the tower. A postern gate was located opposite the entrance, in the outer wall. Living quarters occupied the upper floors, including the top storey built into the roof space.

The northwestern service wing featured a vaulted ground floor divided into two rooms. Based on architectural evidence and surviving illustrations, this wing comprised four floors, including a top storey built into the roof space, and was slightly narrower than the master residential wing.

Inside the castle, a rectangular courtyard featured covered arcades, with a well positioned at its centre. Foundations and sections of the ground floor stone pillars—forming the base of the arcaded structure—were uncovered during archaeological excavations. The space was bounded by a curtain wall—or possibly by an additional building at the far end—that linked the residential wing on the southeast side with the service wing on the northwest. Measuring up to 1.65 metres thick, this wall underscored the castle's defensive character. The original entrance to the castle was a drawbridge spanning the moat, leading directly to the first floor of the castle tower. The doorway was flanked by two loopholes, with a third shooting hole positioned on the northwest side. Internally, this door could be secured by three horizontal bars, inserted into sockets carved into the surrounding masonry.

The lordship remained part of the House of Saszowski estates for over a century, serving as a fortified residence for multiple generations of the family, known at times as Geraltowsky von Geraltowitz (in Polish: Gierałtowski z Gierałtowic). Historical sources describe it as one of the most magnificent castle residences in Upper Silesia, renowned for hosting lavish banquets and sport hunting events attended by the aristocracy. In later years, the castle estate featured its own brewery and inn, located outside the main residence.

Following the death in 1633 of Joanna Geraltowska von Geraltowitz (née Sedlnitzka, Sedlnická), who had inherited Chudów in 1622 as the widow of her first husband, Wenzel the Younger Geraltowsky von Geraltowitz, the estate was managed by her nephew, Johann Skal von Elgot. He also briefly assumed guardianship of her only child, Beata Elisabeth, a young daughter from her second marriage to the late Karl Pražma (†1628), Lord of Wagstadt (Bílkov).

In 1669, the village estate changed hands twice. By 1687, it was recorded as the property of Baron Jerzy von Welczek, governor of the Duchy of Opole and Racibórz (Herzogtum Oppeln und Ratibor). Between 1687 and 1704, the estate was held by the noblewoman Anna Zuzanna von Reuthen, who later transferred ownership to the nobleman Jerzy Franciszek von Holly.

=== Area of lordship ===
The lordship encompassed Chudów Castle, the village of Chudów, and the surrounding villages of Klein Paniow and Antheil Neudorf, along with several farm outworks (Vorwerks): Schlosshof, Dorfhof, Grosshof, Wallhof, Wachhof, Neuhof, and Ballhof. The total land area comprised 3,965 morgens (approximately 991.25 hectares), and in total, 7,000 morgens (approximately 1,750 hectares) of dominial, jurisdictional, and hunting territory. This equated to roughly 27.41 square kilometres (10.58 mi^{2}).

The estate included:

- 2,600 morgens of farmland (approx. 650 hectares)
- 565 morgens of wetland (approx. 141.25 hectares)
- 310 morgens of meadow (approx. 77.5 hectares)
- 440 morgens of forest, ponds, peatland, and marl pits (approx. 110 hectares)

=== 18th century to present-day ===
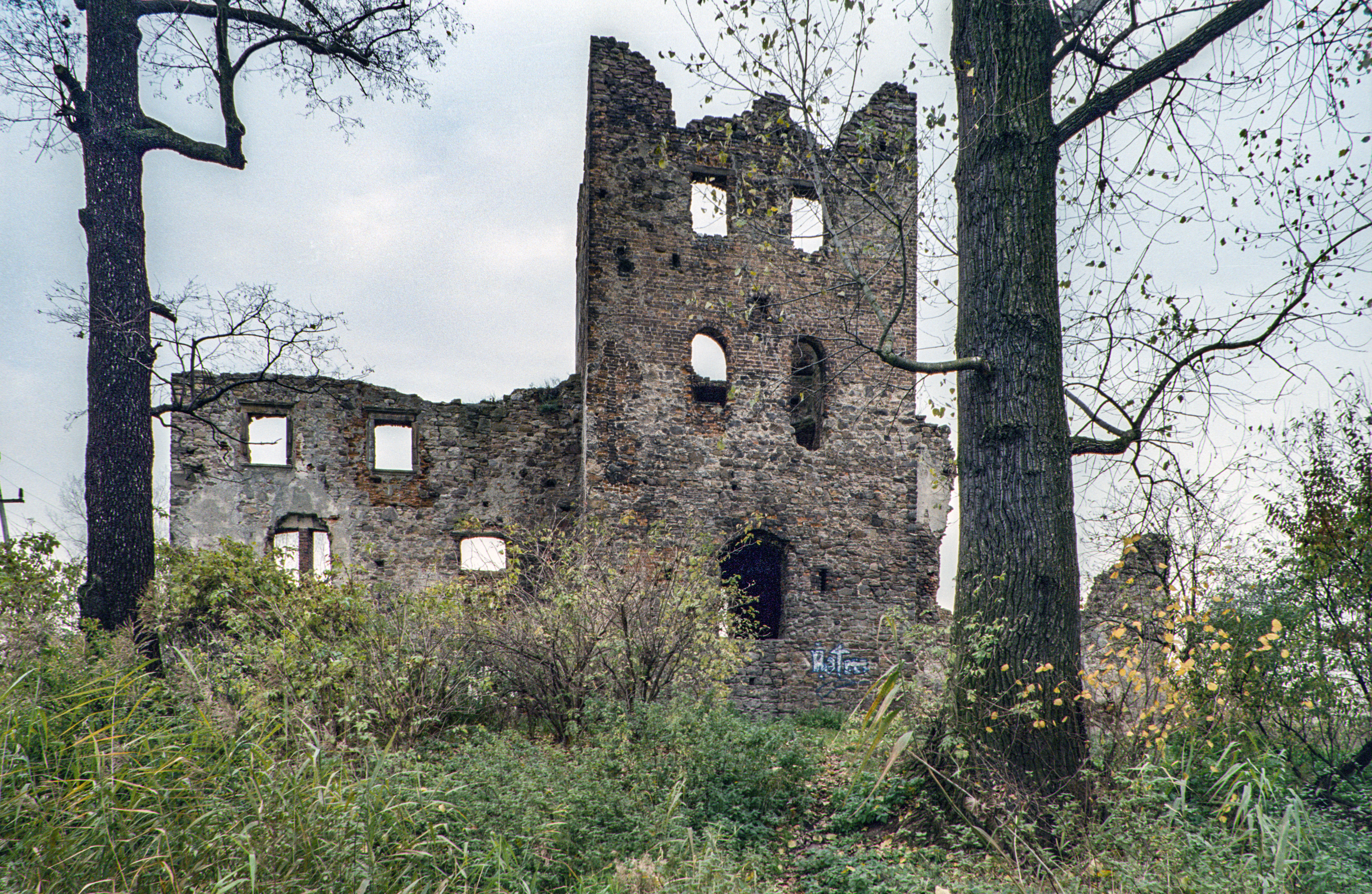
The castle ruins following the severe fire of 1875, prior to the gradual restoration efforts that began in 1995

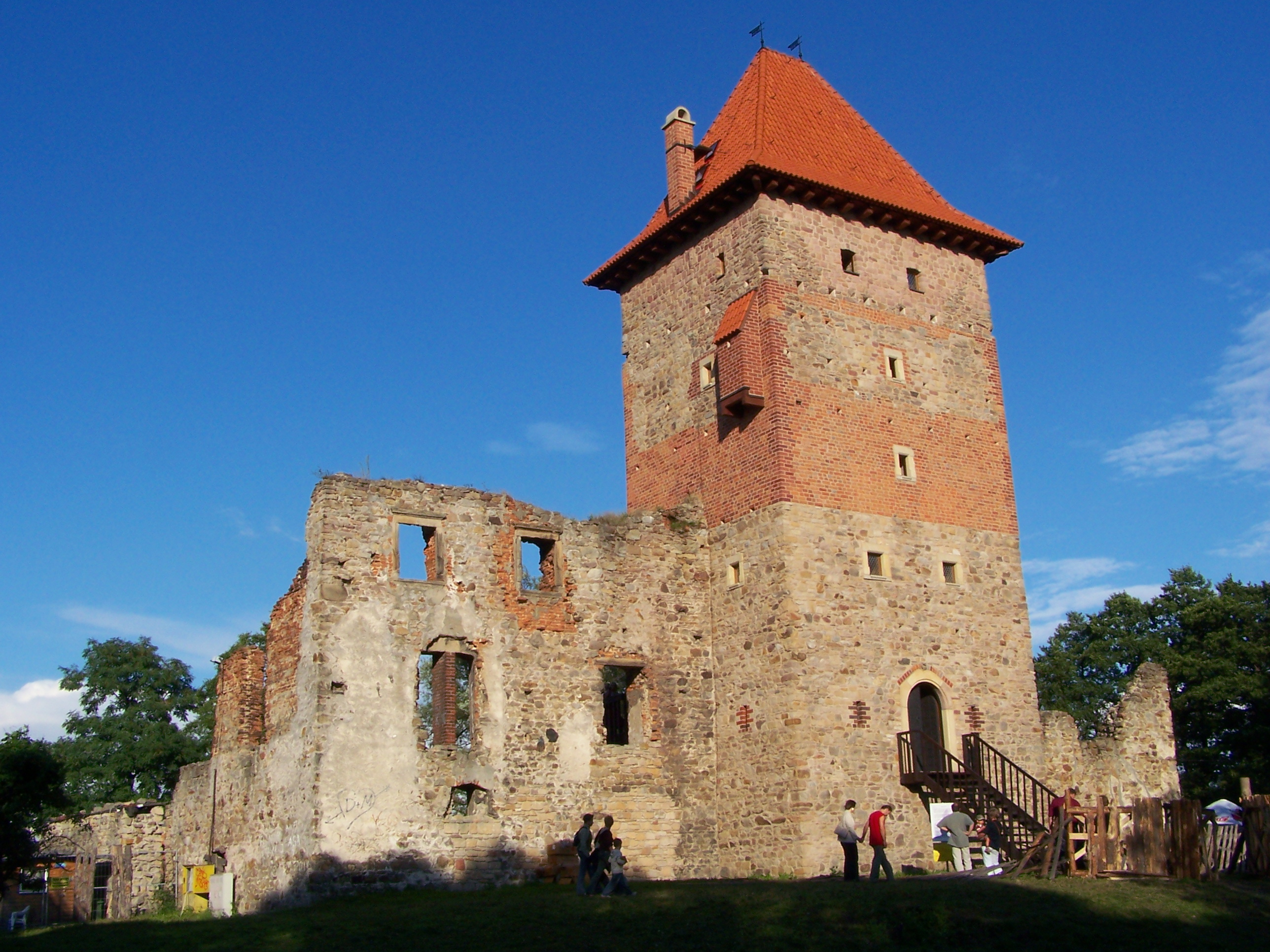
Chudów Castle in 2006, featuring the restored tower

The village estate came under the ownership of the Foglar family in 1706. Later, in 1753, Freiherr Carl von Foglar und Kaltwasser is documented as residing in Chudow. After 1768, the estate changed hands frequently, gradually losing its former significance. In 1837, the castle's owner—German jurist and administrator of the Duchy of Racibórz (Herzogtum Ratibor), Alexander von Bally—carried out several alterations to its original design, resulting in the irreversible loss of its Renaissance character. Von Bally later lost his assets due to unsuccessful investments in hard coal exploration, and in 1844, his estates were put up for auction.

The castle suffered severe fire damage in 1875, after which its final owner, Graf Hans Ulrich Gotthardt von Schaffgotsch, left it as a picturesque ruin. Abandoned since the late 19th century, only fragments of the walls, the four-sided tower, and the outline of the moat have survived to the present day. Since 1966, the castle ruin has been registered under No. A/568 and designated as a site of significant cultural value by the National Heritage Board of Poland. It is officially recognised as an object of cultural heritage. The only known lithograph of the castle, created by Alexander Duncker between 1859 and 1860, depicts the structure after several architectural alterations made by Alexander von Bally in the first half of the 19th century, which significantly altered its original Renaissance form.

In 1995, the newly established Chudów Castle Foundation undertook the gradual restoration of the site. Within the restored tower, a small museum now houses one of Poland's most remarkable exhibitions of ceramic medieval Gothic cocklestove tiles. These tiles were uncovered on the castle grounds during restoration efforts and archaeological excavations.

Since 2000, the Chudów Castle Foundation has hosted an annual medieval fair each August, featuring historical reenactments of tournaments and warfare on the castle grounds.

== Gallery ==
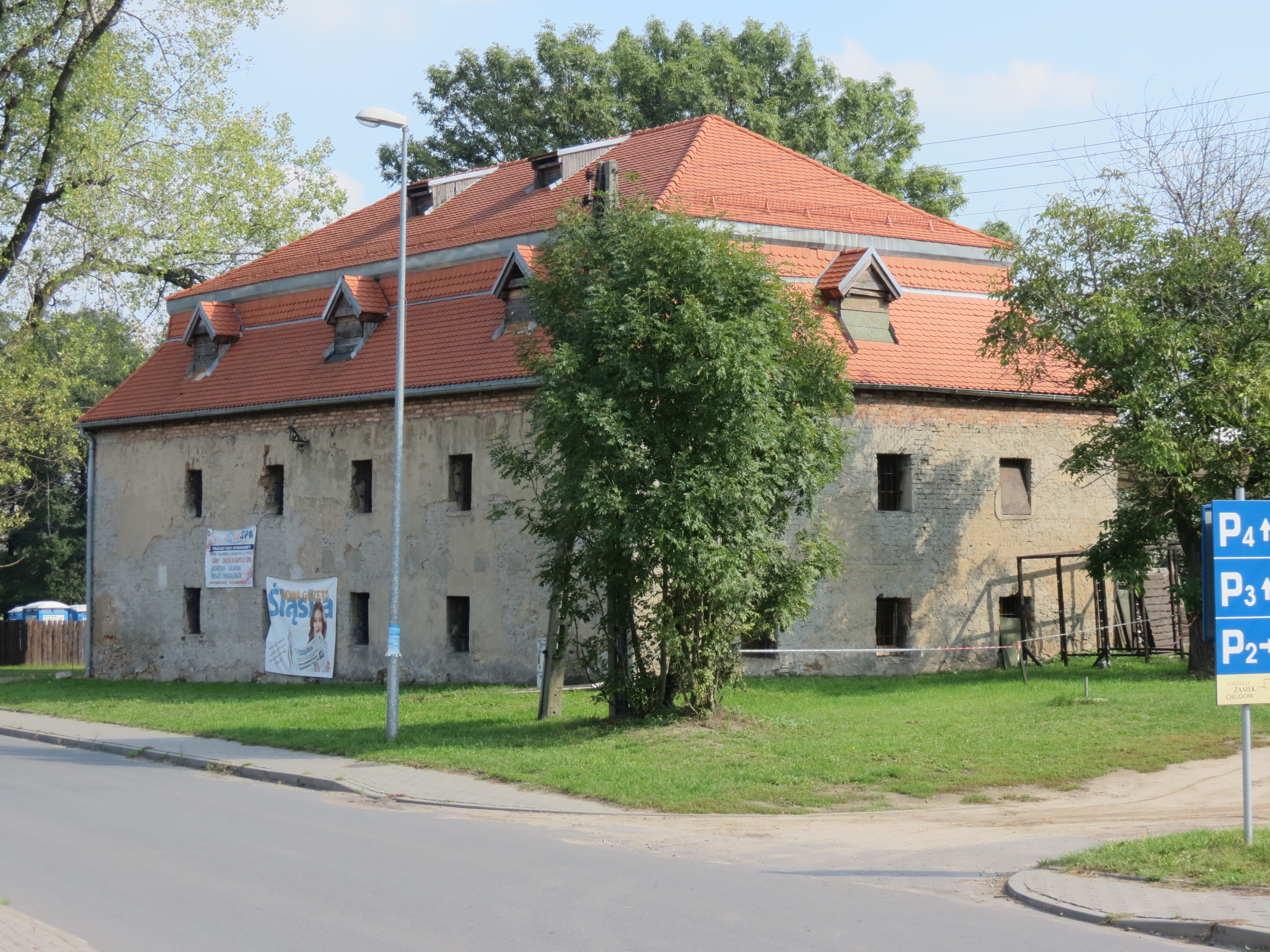
Chudów, Wiejska Street — 18th-century estate granary with brick construction (Monument No. A/569/66)

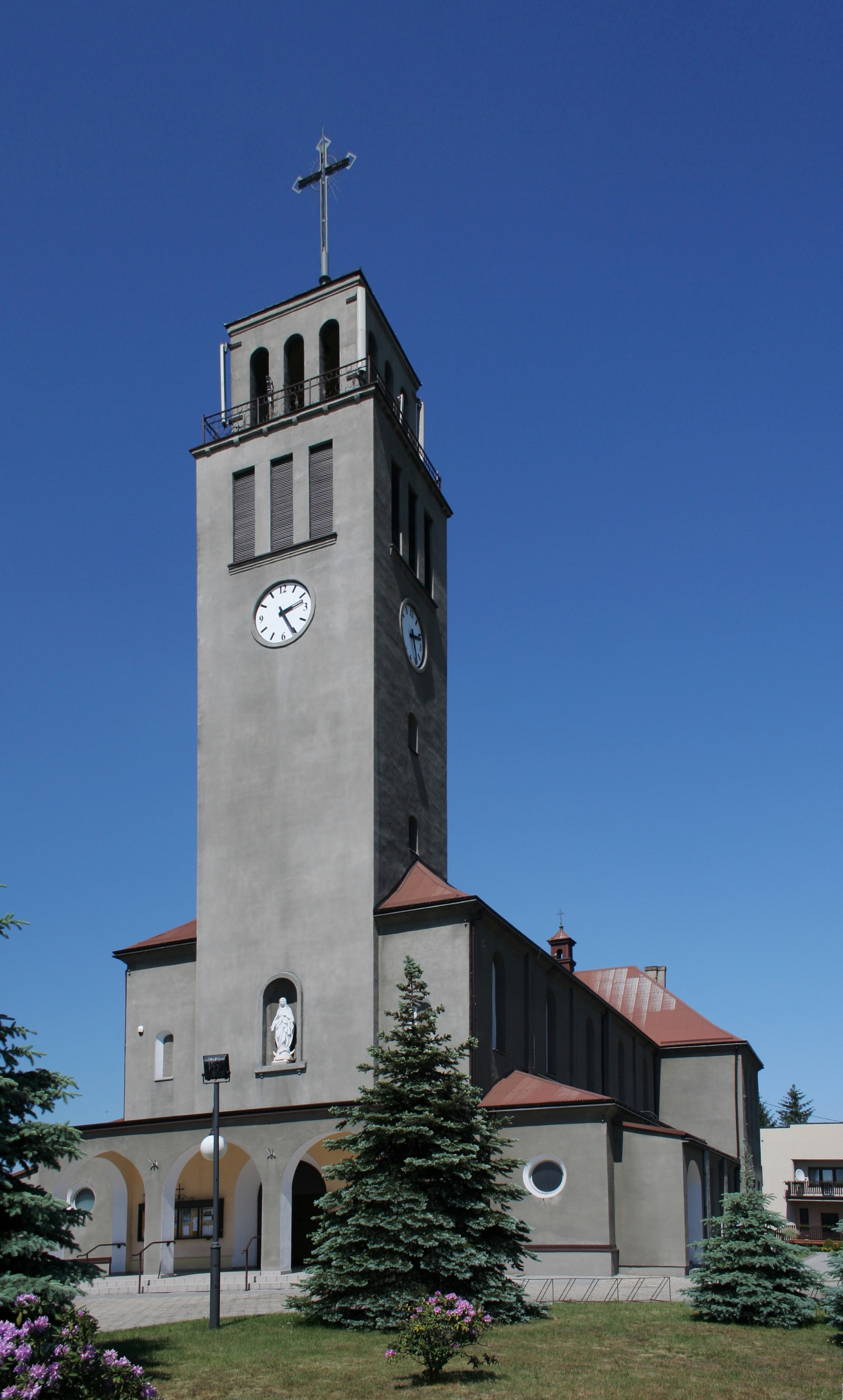
Chudów — Church of Our Lady Queen of Angels (Kościół NMP Królowej Aniołów w Chudowie)

== See also ==
- List of castles in Poland
