= Stefan Cichy =

Polish Roman Catholic prelate

- Bishop Emeritus of Legnica, Auxiliary Bishop of Katowice
- Church: Roman Catholic Church
- Diocese: Legnica

Orders
- Ordination: 22 June 1963 by Bishop Herbert Bednorz
- Consecration: 12 September 1998 by Archbishop Damian Zimoń

Personal details
- Born: 30 March 1939 (age 87) Przyszowice, Poland
- Denomination: Catholic Church
- Education: University of Vienna
- Motto: Per Crucem ad Lucem
- Coat of arms

Bishop Stefan Cichy is a Roman Catholic bishop emeritus of Legnica in Poland.

He was born on 30 March 1939 in Przyszowice, Poland and was a survivor of the Przyszowice massacre.

He was ordained a priest on 23 June 1963 and on 12 September 1998 was consecrated Bishop. From 26 August 1998 until 19 March 2005 he was Auxiliary Bishop of the Archdiocese of Katowice and Titular Bishop of Bonusta in Tunisia. He was Bishop of Legnica from 19 March 2005 until 16 April 2014.

In 2013, a water-filled vessel appearing with a red discoloration; this followed a Christmas Day Mass at the Sanctuary of St. Hyacinth where a host fell during the distribution of communion. The priest involved during said Mass reported it to Bishop Cichy, who in 2014 sent a particle of the host to research labs in Wrocław and Szczecin. The results of the labs' investigations were presented to the Congregation of the Doctrine of the Faith in 2016, which declared it to be an eucharistic miracle.

His motto is "Per Crucem ad Lucem".

Religious titles
Preceded by Tadeusz Rybak	Bishop of Legnica; 2005-2014	Succeeded by Zbigniew Kiernikowski
