= Andrzej Siemieniewski =

Auxiliary bishop of Wrocław

Andrzej Henryk Siemieniewski
- Bishop of Legnica
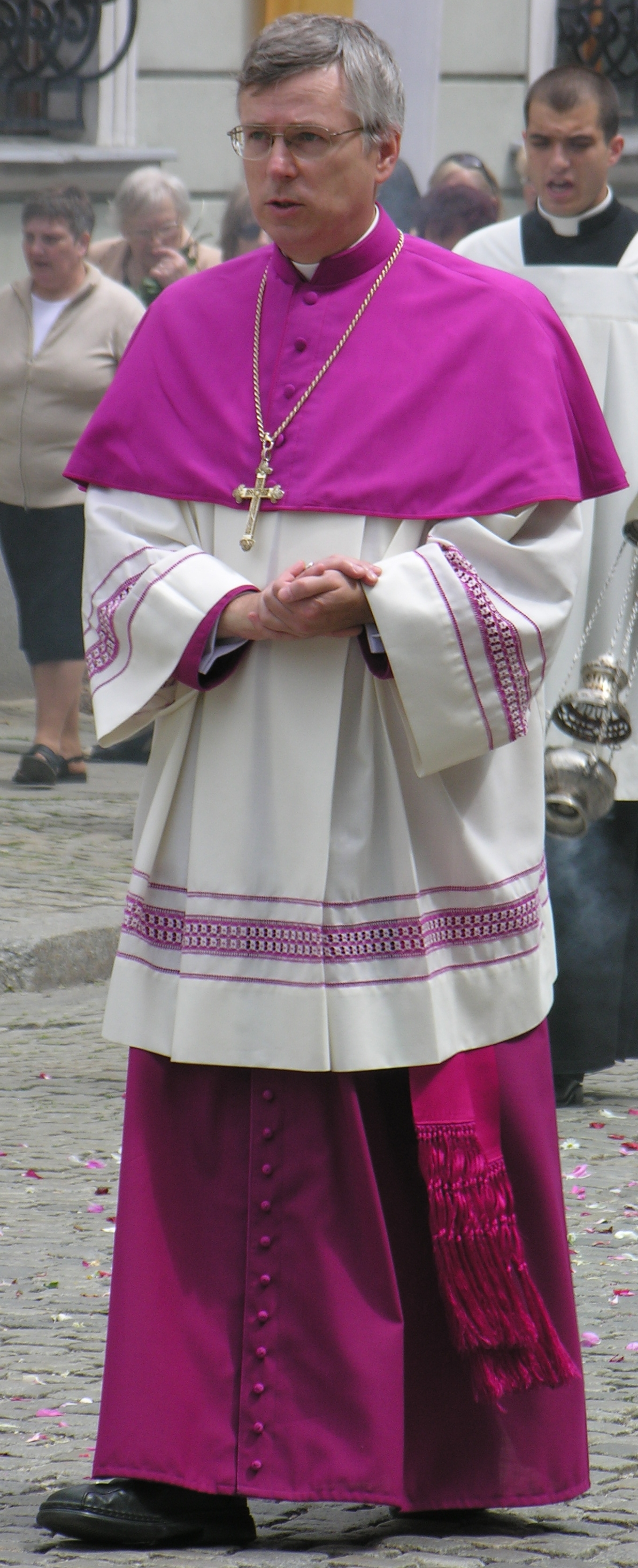
- Church: Catholic Church
- Diocese: Diocese of Legnica
- Appointed: 28 June 2021
- Predecessor: Zbigniew Kiernikowski
- Previous posts: Titular Bishop of Theuzi (2006-2021); Auxiliary Bishop of Wrocław (2006-2021)

Orders
- Ordination: 1 June 1985 by Henryk Gulbinowicz
- Consecration: 11 February 2006 by Marian Gołębiewski

Personal details
- Born: 8 August 1957 (age 69) Wrocław, Wrocław Voivoidship, Polish People's Republic

Styles of Andrzej Siemieniewski
- Reference style: His Excellency
- Spoken style: Your Excellency
- Religious style: Bishop
- Posthumous style: not applicable

Andrzej Henryk Siemieniewski (Polish: [ˈandr̝ɛj ɕɛmʲɛˈɲɛfski] (approx. pron.: /'andjay sheme'neffskee/), born 8 August 1957) is the Polish Roman Catholic bishop of Legnica (since 2021).

== Biography ==
=== Early life ===
Andrzej Henryk Siemieniewski was born in Wrocław, the son of Henryk and Teresa, née Hofman. He attended the Second High School in Wroclaw, where he graduated in 1976.

=== Education ===
He began studies at the Faculty of Fundamental Problems of Technology at the Wroclaw University of Technology. In 1979, he joined the Metropolitan Seminary in Wroclaw. In 1985, at the Pontifical Faculty of Theology in Wroclaw he defended his thesis, ‘The Relationship of Man and God in the Light of Martin Buber’s Philosophy of Dialogue’, written under the direction of Ignacy Dec (formerly the first bishop of Świdnica).

On 1 June 1985, he was ordained a priest by Cardinal Henryk Gulbinowicz, archbishop of Wroclaw.

=== Pastoral activity ===
After his ordination, he worked for two years as a vicar and a catechist in Ss. Stanislaus and Wenceslas Parish in Świdnica. In 1994–2006, he served as assistant to youth movements and religious associations, including Hallelu Jah Community. Since 1998, he has been the archbishop's vicar for priestly formation. He served retreats mainly in Light-Life Movement (widely known as the Oasis Movement) and in Catholic Charismatic Renewal.

=== Educational and scientific activity ===
In 1987, he obtained a master of theology at the Pontifical Faculty of Theology in Wroclaw and was sent to Rome for further studies at Pontifical University of Saint Thomas Aquinas, which he ended in 1991, defending his academic dissertation in Italian ‘Gli Elementi della spiritualità sacerdotale nel pensiero di Hans von Balthasar’ (English: The Components of Priestly Spirituality in the Thought of Hans von Balthasar). After returning to Poland, he served as spiritual director at the Metropolitan Seminary in Wroclaw and taught at the Pontifical Faculty of Theology, there. In 1993–1995, he served as director of the library of both the Seminary and the Faculty. In 1997, he was did habilitation of theology on the basis of his work, ‘Ewangelikalna duchowość nowego narodzenia a tradycja katolicka’ (English: Evangelical Spirituality of the New Birth and Catholic Tradition). In 1998–2001, he was vice-rector of the Pontifical Faculty of Theology. He is the head of the Department of Theology of Spirituality at the Pontifical Faculty of Theology in Wroclaw.

=== Episcopate ===
On 5 January 2006, Pope Benedict XVI appointed him auxiliary bishop of the Archdiocese of Wroclaw (titular bishop of Theuzi). He was consecrated on 11 February 2006, by Archbishop Marian Gołębiewski with the assistance of Cardinal Henryk Gulbinowicz and Bishop Ignacy Dec. For his motto, Bishop Siemieniewski adopted the words from the Scripture: God Is Love (Latin: Deus caritas est).

He is the General Vicar of the Archdiocese of Wroclaw, a delegate of the Conference of the Polish Episcopate for the Movement of Nazareth Families and the ‘FIDES’ Federation of Church Libraries. In Wroclaw Metropolitan Curia, he is also prosynodal examiner and censor. In 2012, he was appointed provost of the Metropolitan Capital of Wroclaw [1].

He is the chairman of the St. Hedwig Dortmund – Wroclaw Interparochial Partnership Foundation.

Because of his passion for Christian apologetics, he is co-founder and custodian of the Catholic Apologetical Portal, Apologetyka.katolik.pl. He is also the chairman of the program counsel of The Wroclaw Theological Review.

On 29 June 2021 Pope Francis appointed Siemieniewski as the new bishop of the Diocese of Legnica, replacing the retiring Zbigniew Kiernikowski.

== Selected publications ==
‘Gli Elementi della spiritualità sacerdotale nel pensiero di Hans von Balthasar’ (English: The Components of Priestly Spirituality in the Thought of Hans von Balthasar — the academic dissertation), Rome 1991.
