= Cathedral of Saint Apostles Peter and Paul, Legnica =

Cathedral of Saints Peter and Paul
- Cathedral of Saint Apostles Peter and Paul in Legnica
- Katedra Świętych Apostołów Piotra i Pawła w Legnicy
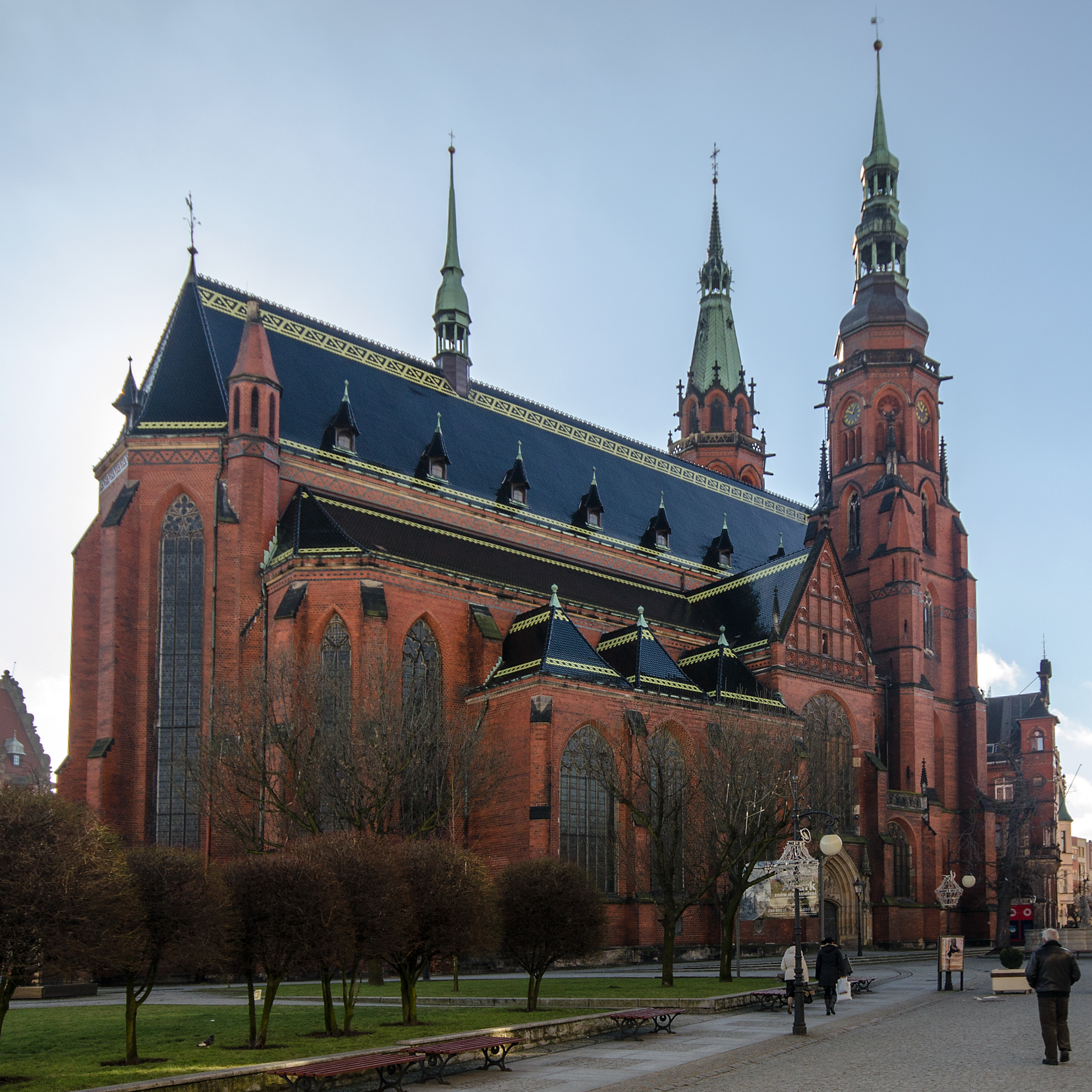
- Cathedral from the intersection of Blessed Virgin Mary and Tadeusz Łączynski Streets

- 51°12′25″N 16°09′42″E
- Location: Legnica
- Country: Poland
- Language: Polish
- Denomination: Catholic

History
- Status: Cathedral
- Dedication: Saint Peter, Saint Paul

Architecture
- Functional status: Active
- Heritage designation: Cultural heritage site
- Designated: 25 November 1949

Administration
- Archdiocese: Wrocław
- Diocese: Legnica

The Cathedral of Saint Apostles Peter and Paul in Legnica is located at Cathedral Square in the city of Legnica, Poland. The present building was erected between 1333 and 1380. A chapel was added in the fifteenth century, and in the late nineteenth century the church was converted into the neo-Gothic style. Over the centuries the church has acquired numerous statues and decorative features. Pope John Paul II established the church as a cathedral on March 25, 1992 and visited the cathedral on June 2, 1997.

== History and architecture ==
First mentioned in 1208, the present building was erected between 1333 and 1380. Among its builders is the bricklayer Wiland, probably the son of a Wroclaw bricklayer of the same name, operating in the 13th century. A chapel was added in the fifteenth century, and in the years 1892-1894 the church was converted into the neo-Gothic style. From 1338 to 1341 the western portal was decorated with a Gothic stone statue of the Blessed Virgin Mary with the Child Jesus. The northern portal shows the bowing of the Three Kings in a rare example of Gothic art. There is also a pentaptych from the fifteenth century with scenes depicting St. Anna Samotrzec, St. Hedwig and scenes of the Passion of Christ - the most valuable, but also the only, historical Gothic painting, located in the chapel on the northern side of the church. Inside there are numerous epitaphs, a Renaissance pulpit from the years 1586–1588, a Baroque altar, a bronze baptismal font in the shape of a 13th-century mass chalice, statues of apostles from the 14th century, a tombstone of the Duke of Brzeg and Legnica Louis II and his wife Elizabeth Brandenburg. In 1645 a captain-lieutenant of the imperial majesty Joachim Friedrich from the Prudnice family of Bilicer was buried in the cathedral.

On March 25, 1992 Pope John Paul II established the church as a cathedral with the bull Totus Tuus Poloniae Populus. The Pope visited the cathedral on June 2, 1997.

On April 10, 2011 in the vestibule of the main entrance to the temple a plaque commemorating the victims of the Polish catastrophe Tu-154 in Smolensk was unveiled. In addition to the list of victims, the plaque also features the following sentence: "The President was humiliated and scoffed at by others during his lifetime and after his death, but for numerous fellow countrymen he was the hope of rebuilding an independent and just Poland".

On November 5, 2014, Father Władysław Bochnak (1934-2014), a long-time priest of the cathedral parish, was buried in the crypt. On March 11, 2017, the first bishop of Legnica, Tadeusz Rybak, was buried there as well.

== Gallery ==
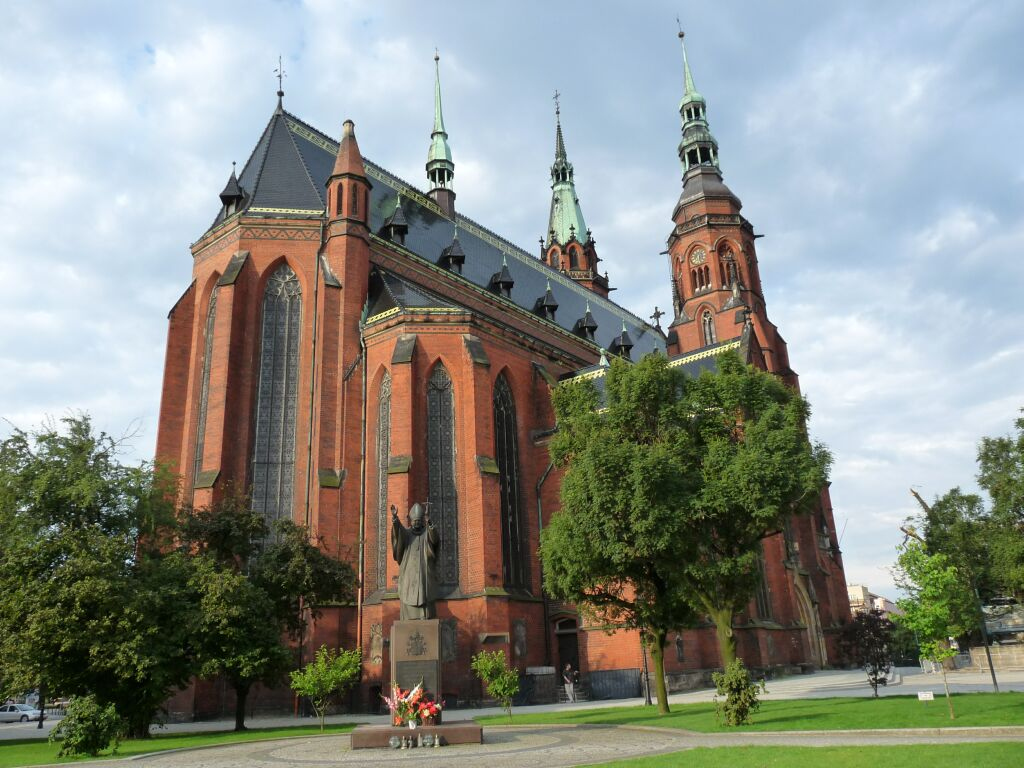
Photo taken from Powstańców Wielkopolskich Square. The monument of John Paul II in the foreground

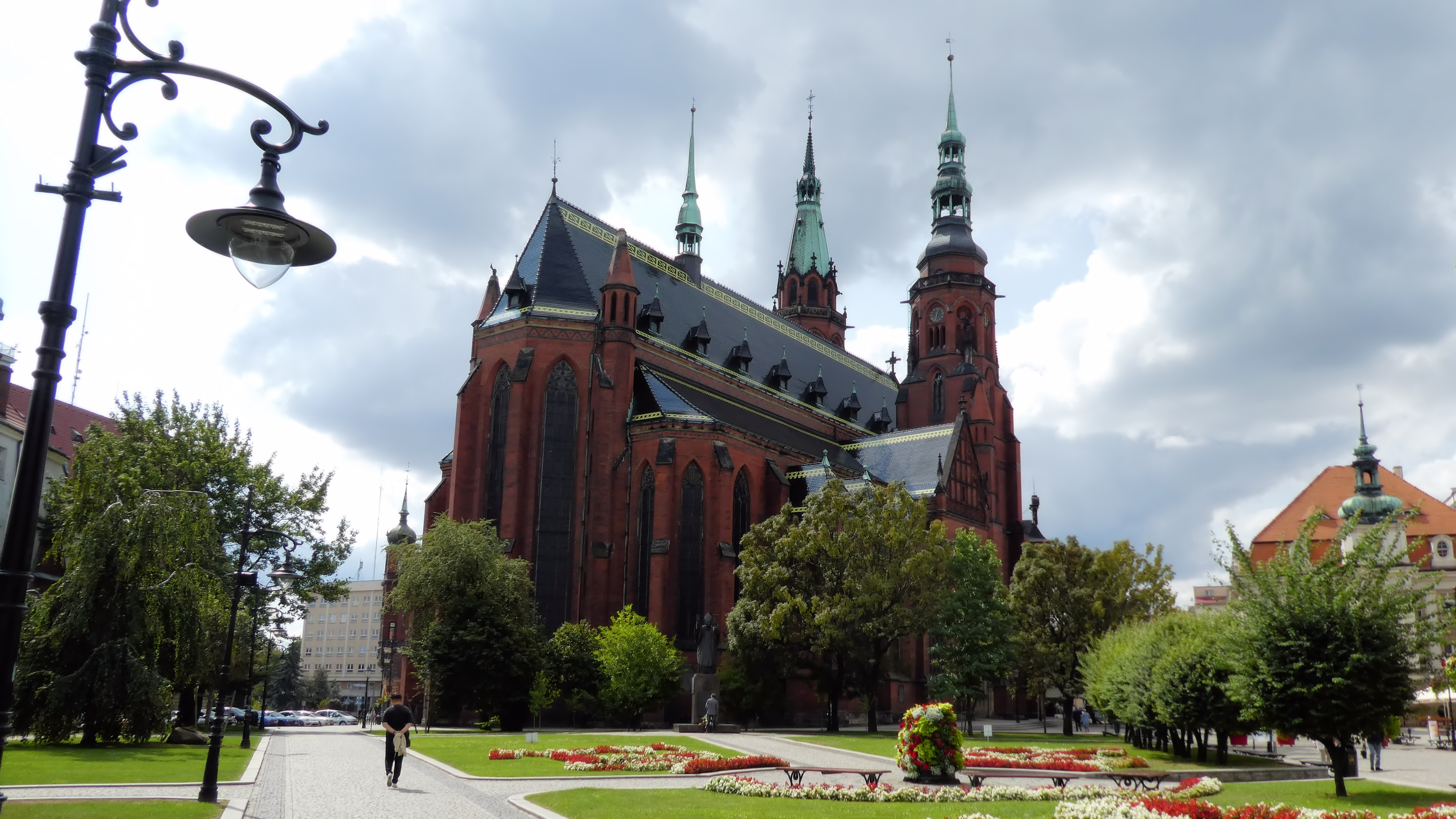
Shot from the northern part of Powstańców Wielkopolskich Square.

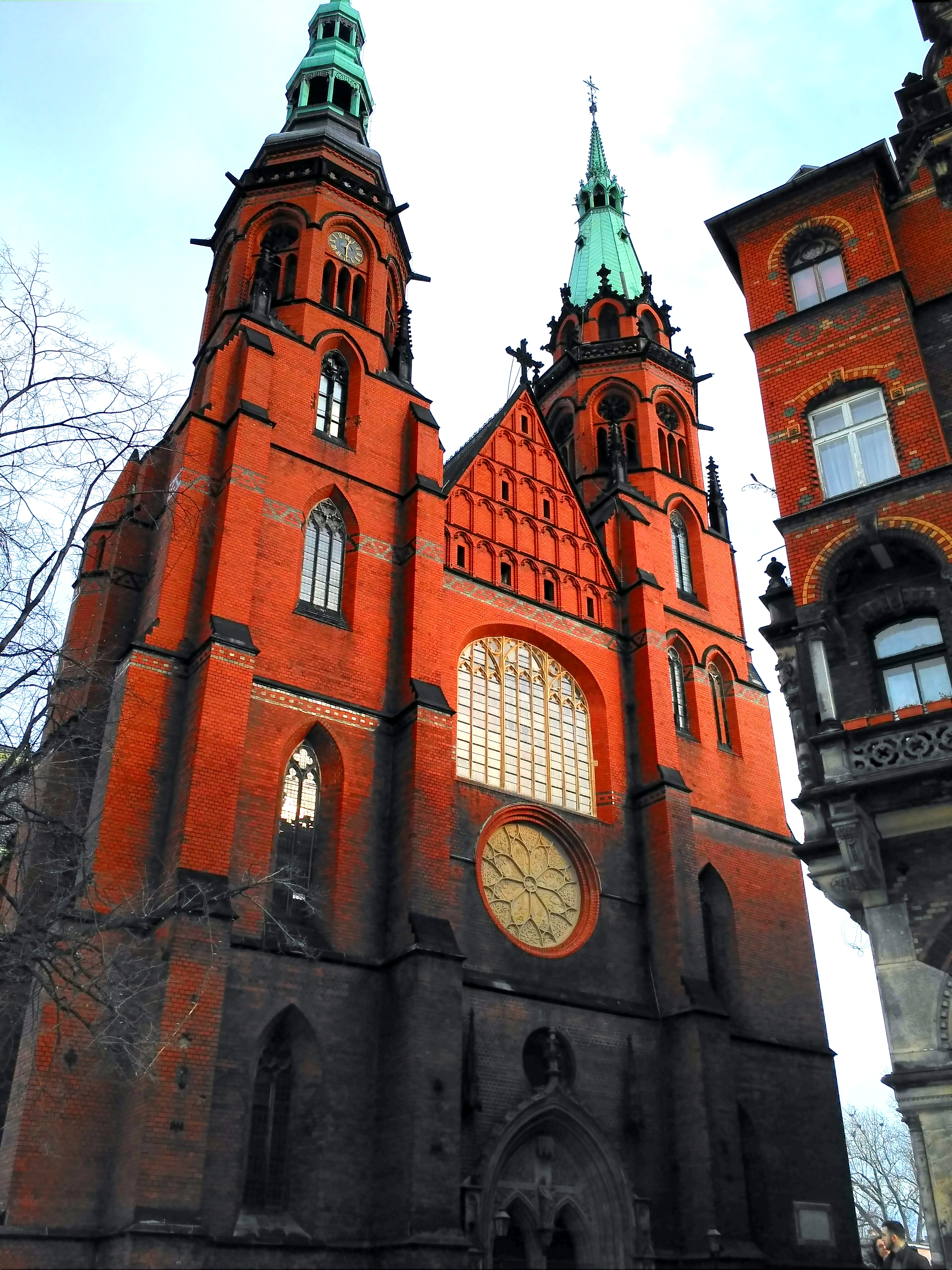
Cathedral towers

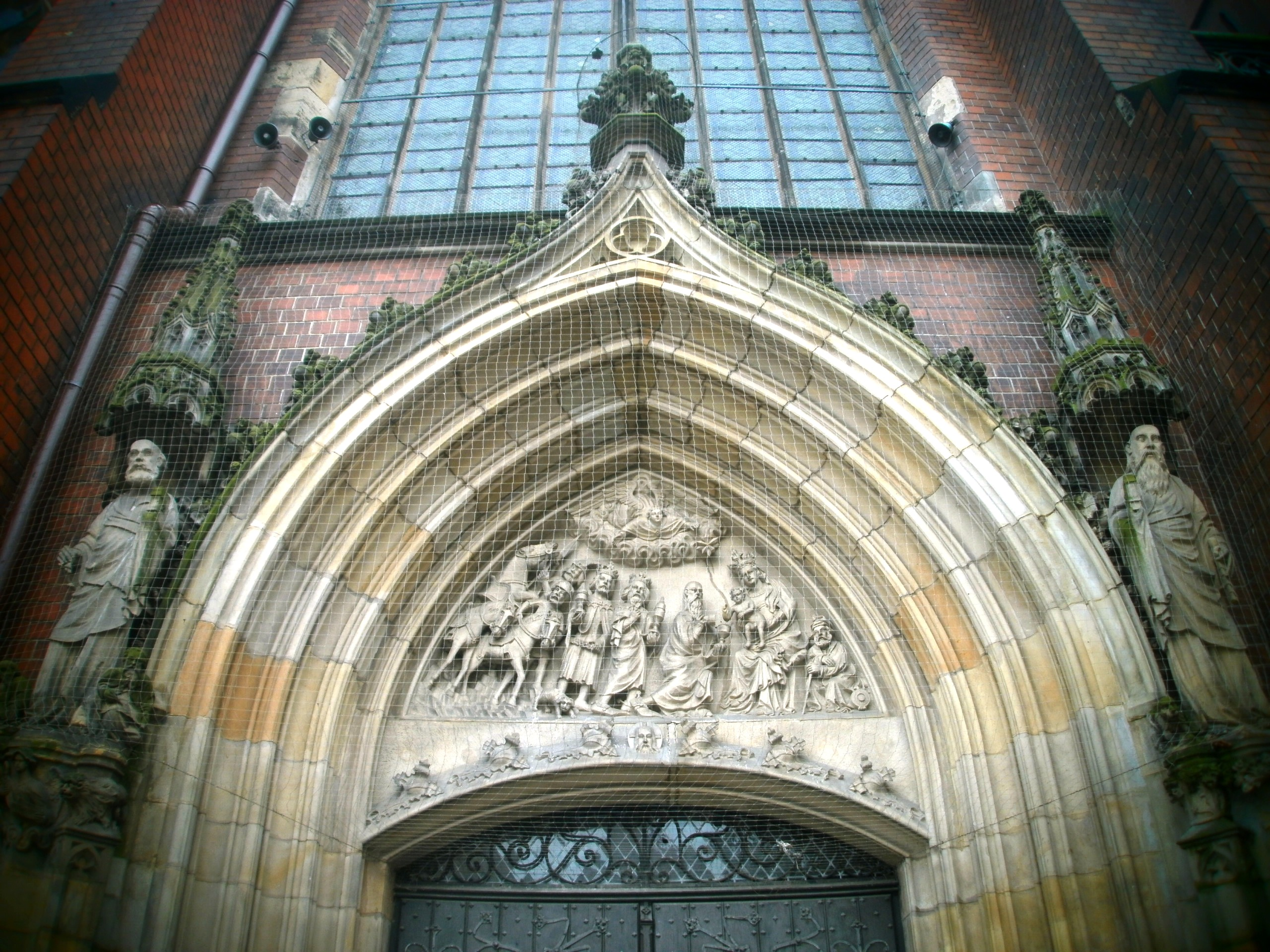
Northern Portal - Bow of the Three Kings

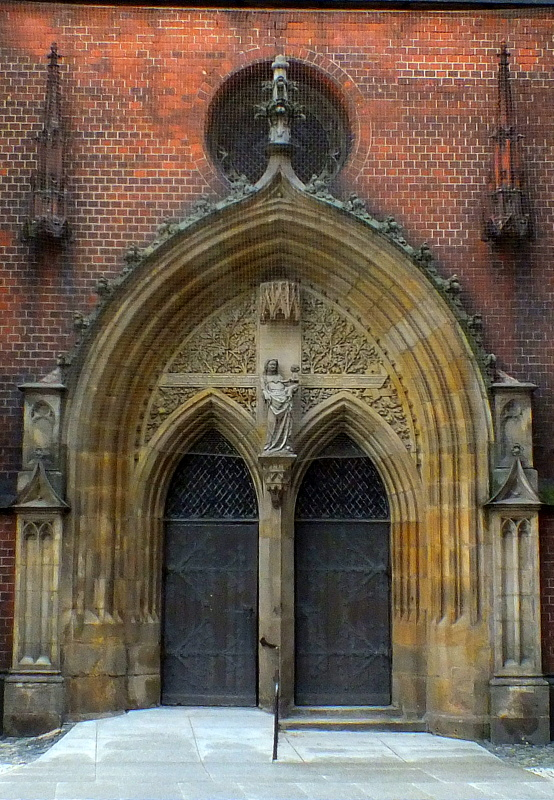
Western Portal

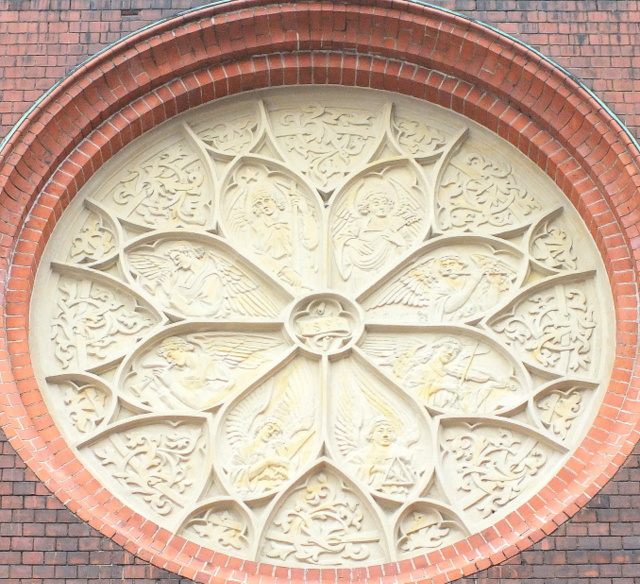
Rosette over the Western Portal

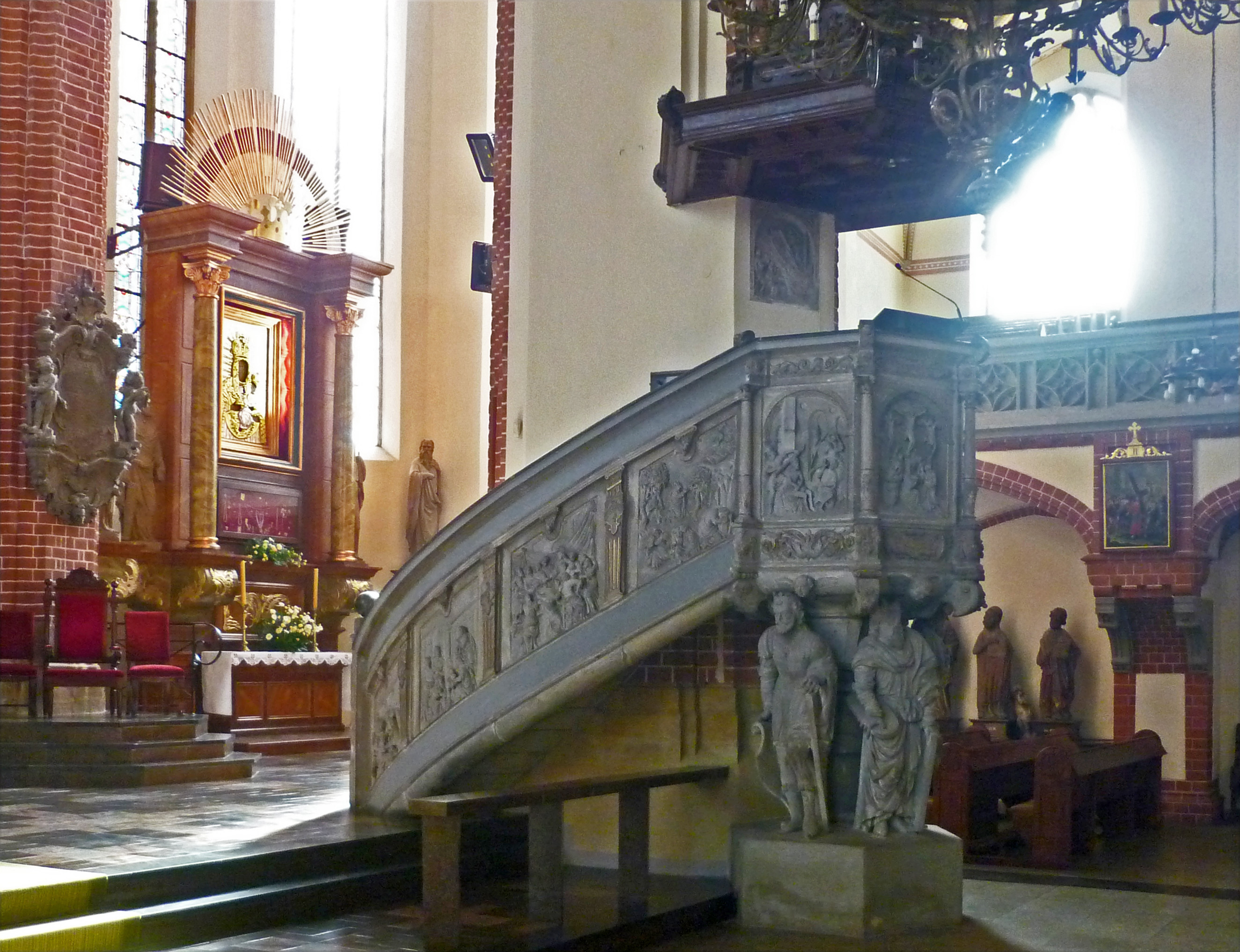
Renaissance pulpit from 1586 to 1588

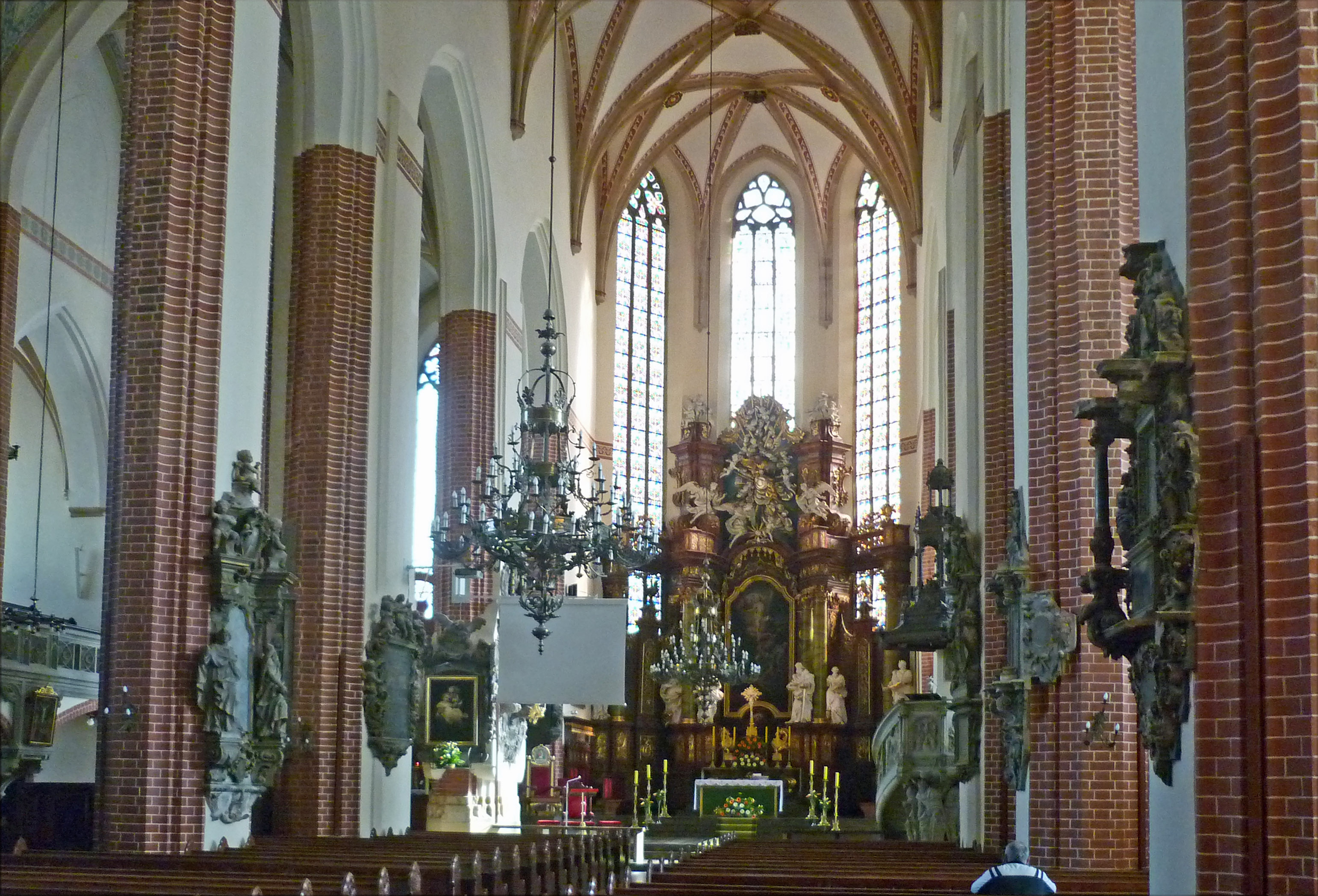
Baroque altar

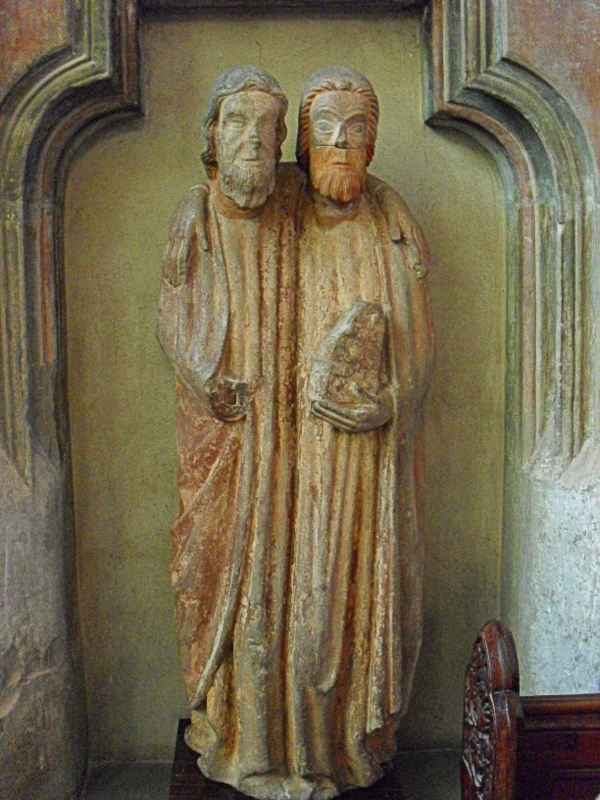
Patrons of the Diocese - St. Peter and Paul

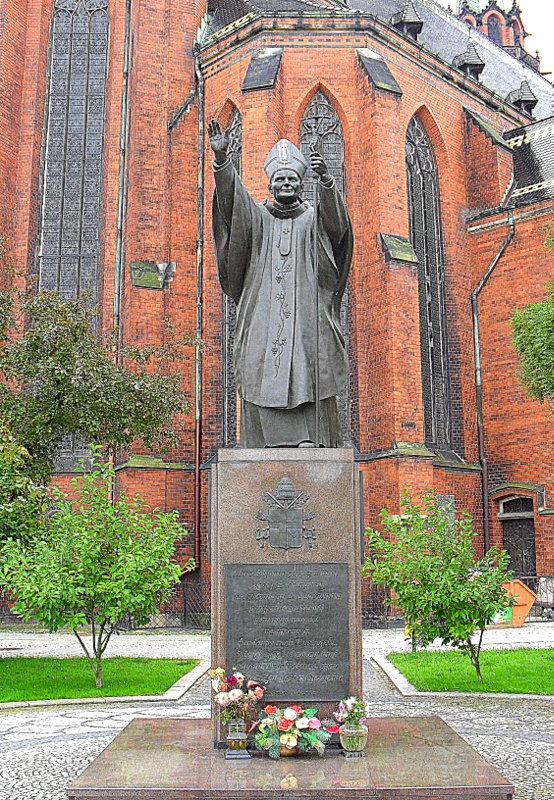
Monument to Pope John Paul II

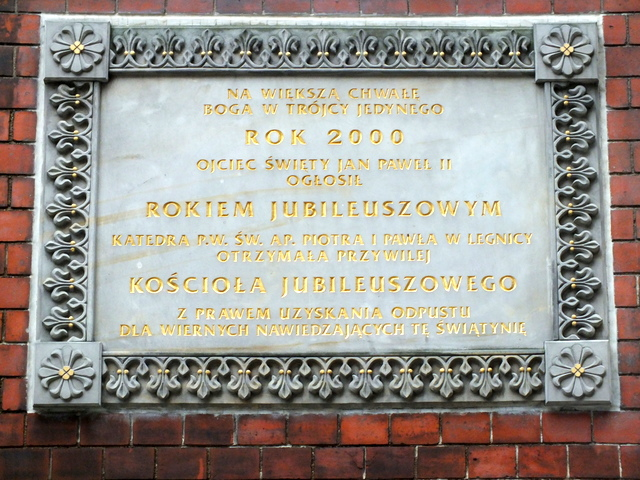
Plaque commemorating the Great Jubilee of the Year 2000
