= Benepota =

The diocese of Benepota (Latin: Dioecesis Benepotensis) is a suppressed and titular see of the Roman Catholic Church.

== History ==
Benepota, in today's Algeria, is an ancient bishopric of the Roman province of Mauretania Caesariensis. The location of the see is not currently known, But what is known is that the Bishop of the town attended a meeting of bishops convened in Carthage in 484 by King Huneric the Vandal.

Today Benepota survives as a titular bishopric and the current bishop is Leopold Hermes Garin Bruzzone, of Canelones.

== Known bishops ==
- Honorius (fl.484 AD)
- Francisco Rendeiro, (1965–1967)
- José Cerviño Cerviño (1968–1976)
- Tadeusz Rybak (1977–1992)
- Leopoldo Hermes Garin Bruzzone, (2002–current)
