= Czeslaw Sokolowski =

Polish Catholic priest, academic, and Nazi collaborator

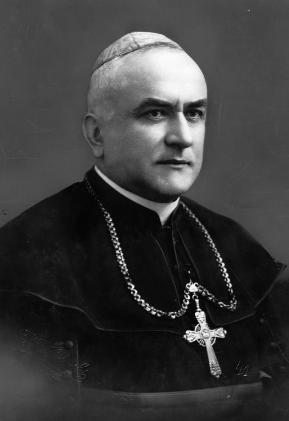
Bishop Czesław Sokołowski

Czesław Sokolowski (July 9, 1877, in Warsaw – November 11, 1951, in Michalin) was a Polish Catholic priest, theologian, academic, and Nazi collaborator.

He served as rector of the Catholic University of Lublin from 1924–1925, and of the Faculty of Catholic Theology at the University of Warsaw. He was auxiliary bishop of Siedlce from 1919 to 1940, titular bishop of Pentacomia and apostolic administrator of the diocese of Siedlce from 1940–1946.

After World War II, he was one of 4 bishops convicted as a Nazi collaborator for striking a deal with the Nazi occupation forces. He was sentenced to death by the Warsaw Area Special Military Court of the Polish Home Army. The verdict was later downgraded to a sentence of loss of civil rights and public reputation.
