= Tadeusz Rybak =

Polish Roman Catholic bishop

- Bishop Emeritus of the Diocese of Legnica, Auxiliary Bishop of Wrocław
- Church: Roman Catholic Church
- Diocese: Legnica
- In office: 1992 – 2002

Orders
- Ordination: 2 August 1953
- Consecration: 28 April 1977 by Pope Paul IV

Personal details
- Born: October 7, 1929 Milanówek, Poland
- Died: 7 March 2017 (aged 87)
- Education: John Paul II Catholic University of Lublin (ThD)
- Motto: Per Christum in Spiritu ad Patrem

Tadeusz Rybak (October 7, 1929 – March 7, 2017) was a Polish Roman Catholic bishop. He served as the first Bishop of the Diocese of Legnica between 1992 and 2002; he was also titular bishop of Benepota between 1977 and 1992.

Ordained to the priesthood in 1953, Rybak served as auxiliary bishop of the Roman Catholic Archdiocese of Wrocław from 1977 to 1992; he then served as bishop of the Roman Catholic Diocese of Legnica from 1992 to 2002. He was also titular bishop of the diocese of Benepota, having been appointed on 28 April 1977.

Tadeusz died on 7 March 2017. He is buried at the Cathedral of Saint Apostles Peter and Paul in Legnica.

== Notes ==
Religious titles
New diocese	Bishop of Legnica; 1992 – 2002	Succeeded by Stefan Cichy
Preceded by José Cerviño Cerviño	Titular Bishop of Benepota; 1977 – 1992	Vacant Title next held by Leopoldo Hermes Garin Bruzzone
