= Przyszowice massacre =

Massacre in Przyszowice, Poland

Coordinates: 50°15′00″N 18°45′00″E

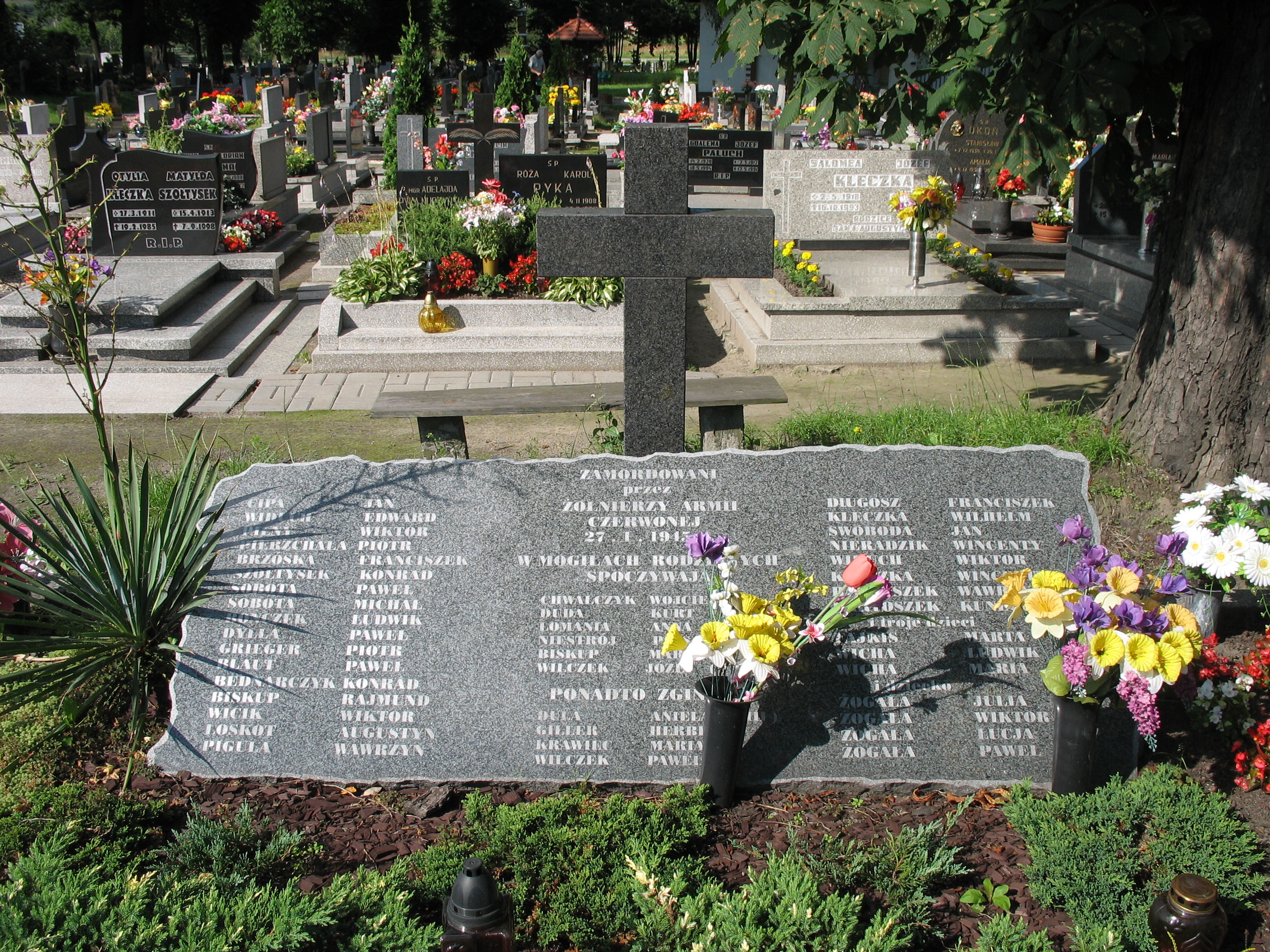
- Tombstone to the victims of Przyszowice massacre. It lists the victims with the statement: "Murdered by the Red Army." Placed during the 2005 commemorative event
- Location: Przyszowice, Upper Silesia, occupied Poland
- Date: January 26, 1945
- Target: Poles
- Attack type: Shooting
- Deaths: 54 to 69
- Perpetrator: Red Army
- Motive: Unknown

The Przyszowice massacre (Polish: Zbrodnia przyszowicka or tragedia przyszowicka) was a massacre perpetrated by the Red Army against civilian inhabitants of the Polish village of Przyszowice in Upper Silesia during the period January 26 to January 28, 1945. Sources vary on the number of victims, which range from 54 to over 60 – and possibly as many as 69. The Institute of National Remembrance, a Polish organization that carried out research into these events, has declared that the Przyszowice massacre was a crime against humanity.

== History ==
After the start of the Soviet January offensive in early 1945, the Red Army broke through from the line of the Vistula River well into German-held territory in occupied Poland. By late January, the scattered forces of the Wehrmacht were withdrawn to the line of the Oder River, which was on the pre-war territory of the Third Reich. However, several German units were ordered to prepare tactical counter-attacks, notably in the region of Upper Silesia, on the Polish-German borderland. On January 23, Soviet forces seized the town of Gleiwitz (Gliwice), one of the major industrial centres of the area. On the following day, the Germans counter-attacked, precipitating a three-day-long battle for the area. Eventually victorious, on January 26 the Russians entered the village of Przyszowice, the last Polish village before the Polish-German border.

During the following two days, a massacre of local inhabitants ensued. The Soviet soldiers set several dozen houses on fire and began shooting at the civilians trying to extinguish the flames. It is believed that over 60 civilians lost their lives, Polish newspapers gave the high-end number of 69. Men, women and children aged between 10 days and 78 years were killed, although most of the victims were adult men. Among the victims were four former prisoners of the Auschwitz concentration camp who had escaped from a death march the previous day. Except for two of the escapees who were Italian and Hungarian, the rest of the victims were Polish civilians – including two former soldiers of the Polish Army, who had recently been freed by the Soviets from a prisoner of war camp. According to Polish media, in addition to the mass murder of civilians, the Soviet forces looted the village and raped an unknown number of women.

The reason for the massacre remains unknown. Some authors believe that the Soviet soldiers wanted to take revenge for the losses suffered by the Red Army during the recent skirmishes with the Wehrmacht in the area. During the fighting for Przyszowice, the Soviets suffered 101 casualties and lost roughly 40 tanks. It is also likely that the Soviet soldiers did not know they were still on Polish soil and instead believed they had finally entered the territories of Nazi Germany; Przyszowice was one of the westernmost villages of the Second Polish Republic, on the pre-war border between Poland and Germany.

Following the massacre, the victims were buried in a mass grave in a local cemetery. Polish newspapers also note that two more civilians were killed in the summer of that year, after the end of the war, when Red Army troops were returning from Germany. A man was strafed by a Soviet plane in June, and a woman killed in July by a group of Soviet soldiers stealing a cow. During the years of Communist rule in Poland (which lasted until 1989), factual knowledge of these events was censored by the communist government, and the mass grave was kept anonymous. It was not until the 60th anniversary of the event in 2005 that a memorial stone was erected at the cemetery. The commemorative ceremony was performed by the bishop of Legnica, Stefan Cichy, who was personally an eye-witness to the events, as well as a relative of one of the victims.

Around that time, the Katowice branch of the Institute of National Remembrance (IPN) started an investigation into the events, as well as on similar massacres carried out in Gliwice and Ruda Śląska-Halemba. During the investigation, various documents provided by the Defence Ministry of the Russian Federation were examined, however, there was insufficient information to determine which units of the Red Army participated in the massacre or who was responsible for the killings. In reporting the results of its investigation, the IPN declared the 1945 events in Przyszowice a crime against humanity. It is estimated that at least a thousand civilians were killed by the Soviets in Silesia, many of whom were ethnic Poles and Silesians; most of these deaths, about 800, occurred in the Gliwice massacre.

== See also ==
- Soviet war crimes
- List of massacres in Poland
- World War II atrocities in Poland
