= Gmina Gierałtowice =

Gmina Gierałtowice Gierałtowice Commune
- Gmina
- Coat of arms
- Interactive map of Gmina Gierałtowice
- Coordinates (Gierałtowice): 50°13′0″N 18°43′0″E
- Country: Poland
- Voivodeship: Silesian
- County: Gliwice
- Seat: Gierałtowice

Area
  - Total: 39 km^{2} (15 sq mi)

Population (2019-06-30)
  - Total: 12,096
  - Density: 310/km^{2} (800/sq mi)
- Website: http://www.gieraltowice.pl/

Gmina Gierałtowice is a rural gmina (administrative district) in Gliwice County, Silesian Voivodeship, in southern Poland. Its seat is the village of Gierałtowice, which lies approximately 9 kilometres (6 mi) south-east of Gliwice and 21 km (13 mi) west of the regional capital Katowice.

The gmina covers an area of 39 square kilometres (15.1 sq mi), and as of 2019 its total population is 12,096.

== Villages ==
Gmina Gierałtowice contains the villages of Chudów, Gierałtowice, Paniówki and Przyszowice.

== Neighbouring gminas ==
Gmina Gierałtowice is bordered by the towns of Gliwice, Knurów, Mikołów, Ruda Śląska and Zabrze, and by the gmina of Ornontowice.
