= Szamarzewo =

- Village
- Location within Poland
- Coordinates: 52°14′14″N 17°43′52″E
- Country: Poland
- Voivodeship: Greater Poland
- County: Września
- Gmina: Kołaczkowo

Szamarzewo (German 1939-1945 Ellerode) [ʂamaˈʐɛvɔ] is a village in the administrative district of Gmina Kołaczkowo, within Września County, Greater Poland Voivodeship, in west-central Poland.

== People ==
- Zbigniew Kiernikowski (b. 1946), Roman Catholic bishop
