= Eugene Rozhitsky =

Father Eugene Ionnikievich Rozhitsky (Polish: Eugeniusz Różycki, born on 24 December 1896, Litvinkov, Russian Empire - ?) was an Eastern Orthodox (later the Greek Catholic) priest.

== Biography ==
Eugene Rozhitsky was born on 24 December 1896 in the Litvinkov village, Ukraine in the family of John and Anastasia Rozhitsky. In 1921 he was ordained an Orthodox priest. In February 1925 Eugene, in his work "Adultery as a legal ground for divorce" received the title of Doctor of Laws. On 16 October 1925 he converted to Catholic Church due to the work of Bishop Henryk Ignacy Przeździecki, and served in the Latin Diocese of Siedlce in villages strips and Dokudovo. On 21 February 1927 Rozhistsky was appointed rector of the Byzantine Catholic parish in Kostomlotah, but soon returned to the Orthodox Church and as Orthodox priest ministered in Vilnius in the Izha village (now Vileyka Raion, in the Minsk Region). Father Eugene Rozhitsky was subsequently re-admitted in the Catholic Church, but he could not continue to serve as a priest because he worked as a teacher in Lutsk.
