= Diocese of Legnica =

Diocese of the Catholic Church in Poland

Coordinates: 51°12′25″N 16°09′42″E

Diocese of Legnica Dioecesis Legnicensis Diecezja Legnicka

Catholic
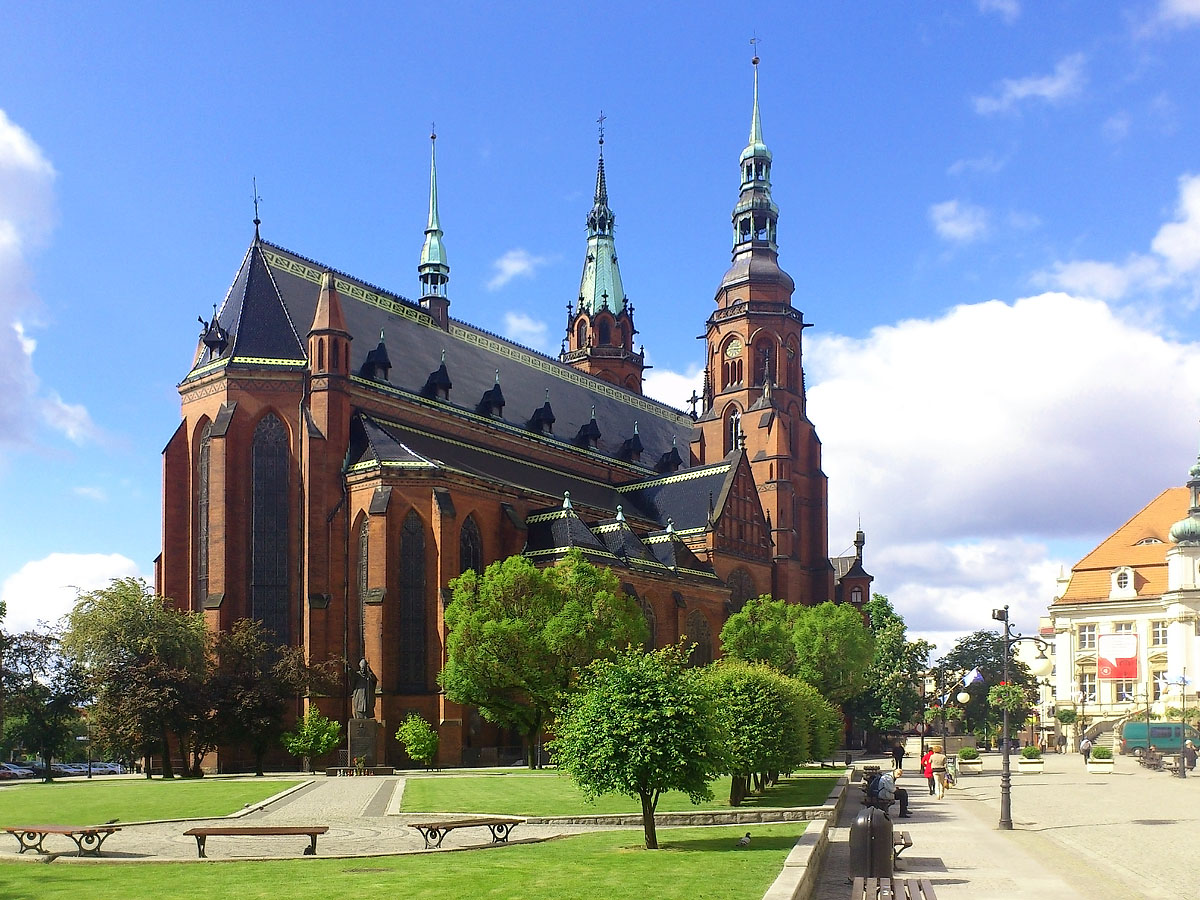
- Cathedral of Sts. Peter and Paul in Legnica

Location
- Country: Poland
- Ecclesiastical province: Wrocław
- Metropolitan: Wrocław

Statistics
- Area: 7,100 km^{2} (2,700 sq mi)
- Population: Total; Catholics: (as of 2019); 839,700; 816,100 (97.2%)

Information
- Denomination: Catholic Church
- Rite: Latin Rite
- Established: 25 March 1992
- Cathedral: Katedra św. Apostołów Piotra i Pawła (Cathedral of Sts. Peter and Paul)

Current leadership
- Bishop: Andrzej Siemieniewski
- Metropolitan Archbishop: Józef Kupny
- Auxiliary Bishops: Piotr Wawrzynek
- Bishops emeritus: Stefan Cichy; Zbigniew Kiernikowski

Website
- Website of the Diocese

Map of Roman Catholic Diocese of Legnica

The Diocese of Legnica (Latin: Dioecesis Legnicensis) is a Latin Church diocese of the Catholic Church located in the city of Legnica in the ecclesiastical province of Wrocław in Poland. According to the Catholic Church statistics 30.1% of the population attended a church every Sunday and holy obligation day or more often in 2013.

== History ==
- March 25, 1992: Established as Diocese of Legnica from the Metropolitan Archdiocese of Wrocław
- December 25, 2013: An Eucharistic Miracle known as Eucharistic Miracle of Legnica happened. A consecrated host transformed into heart muscle human tissue in agony. This was confirmed by the University of Wrocław and University of Szczecin.

== Special churches ==
- Minor Basilicas:
  - Bazylika św. Erazma i św. Pankracego w Jeleniej Górze
  - Bazylika Wniebowzięcia Najświętszej Marii Panny, Krzeszów
  - Bazylika Wniebowzięcia Najświętszej Maryi Panny i św. Mikołaja w Bolesławcu

== Leadership ==
- Bishops of Legnica (Roman rite)
  - Bishop Tadeusz Rybak (1992.03.25 – 2005.03.19)
  - Bishop Stefan Cichy (2005.03.19 – 2014.04.16)
  - Bishop Zbigniew Kiernikowski (2014.04.16 – 2021.06.28)
  - Bishop Andrzej Siemieniewski (since 2021.06.28)

== See also ==
- Roman Catholicism in Poland

== Sources ==
- GCatholic.org
- Catholic Hierarchy
- Diocese website
