= Paniówki =

- Village
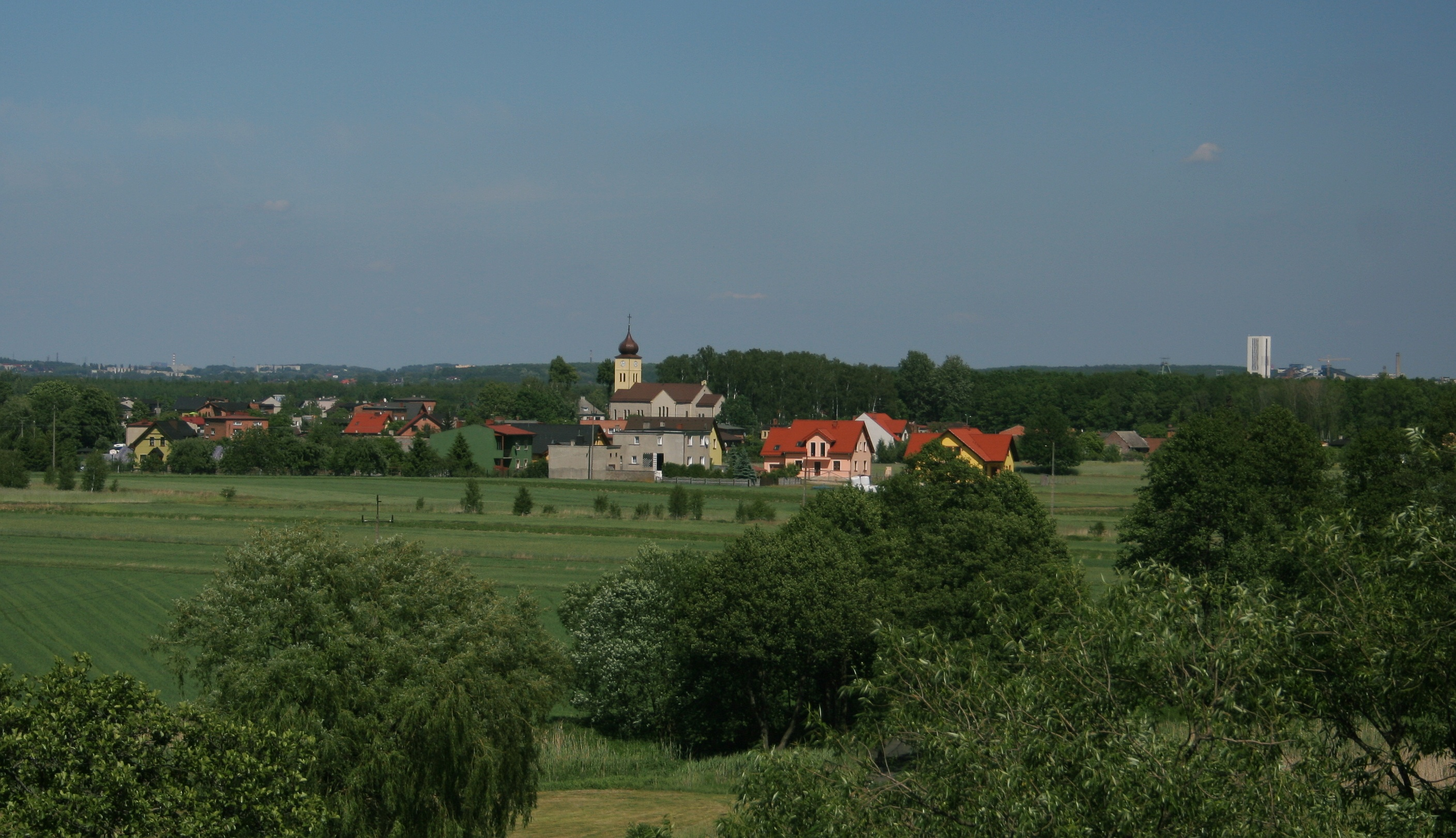
- Paniówki seen from the Chudów Castle

- Coat of arms

- Location within Poland
- Coordinates: 50°14′N 18°46′E
- Country: Poland
- Voivodeship: Silesian
- County: Gliwice
- Gmina: Gierałtowice

Population
  - Total: 2,297
- Website: http://www.paniowki.pl/

Paniówki [paˈɲufki] is a village in the administrative district of Gmina Gierałtowice, within Gliwice County, Silesian Voivodeship, in southern Poland.
