= Gierałtowice, Silesian Voivodeship =

Gierałtowice
- Village
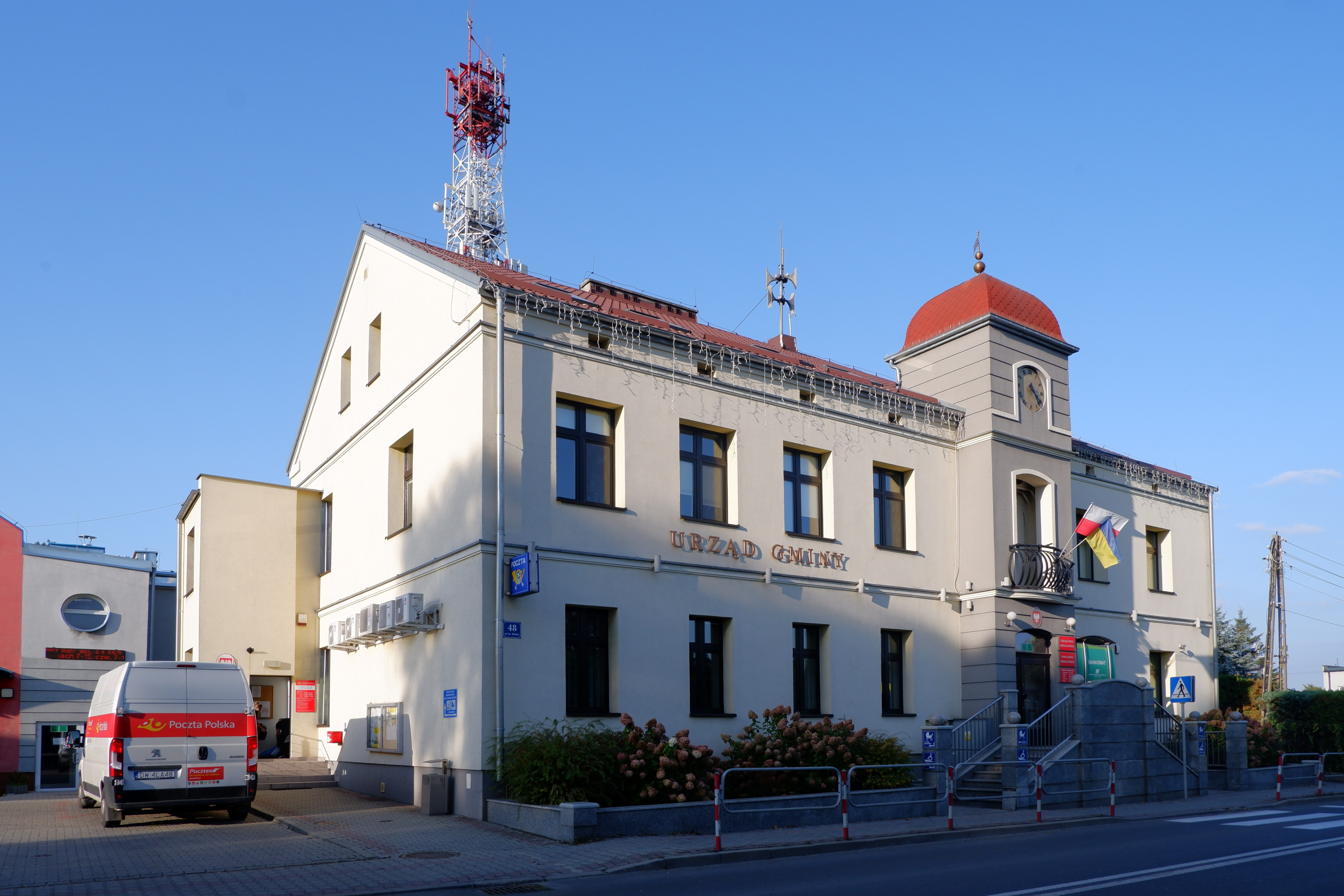
- Gmina administration building

- Coat of arms

- Location within Poland
- Coordinates: 50°13′N 18°43′E
- Country: Poland
- Voivodeship: Silesian
- County: Gliwice
- Gmina: Gierałtowice

Population
  - Total: 3,752
- Time zone: UTC+1 (CET)
  - Summer (DST): UTC+2 (CEST)
- Vehicle registration: SGL

Gierałtowice [ɡʲɛrau̯tɔˈvit͡sɛ] (Silesian: Gierołtowice) is a village in Gliwice County, Silesian Voivodeship, in southern Poland. It is the seat of the gmina (administrative district) called Gmina Gierałtowice.

== History ==
Following the German-Soviet invasion of Poland, which started World War II in September 1939, Gierałtowice was occupied by Germany until 1945. The local Polish police chief and three other policemen from Gierałtowice were murdered by the Russians in the Katyn massacre in 1940.
