= Diocese of Siedlce =

Roman Catholic diocese in Poland

Coordinates: 52°10′11″N 22°16′27″E

Diocese of Siedlce Dioecesis Siedlecensis Diecezja Siedlecka

Catholic
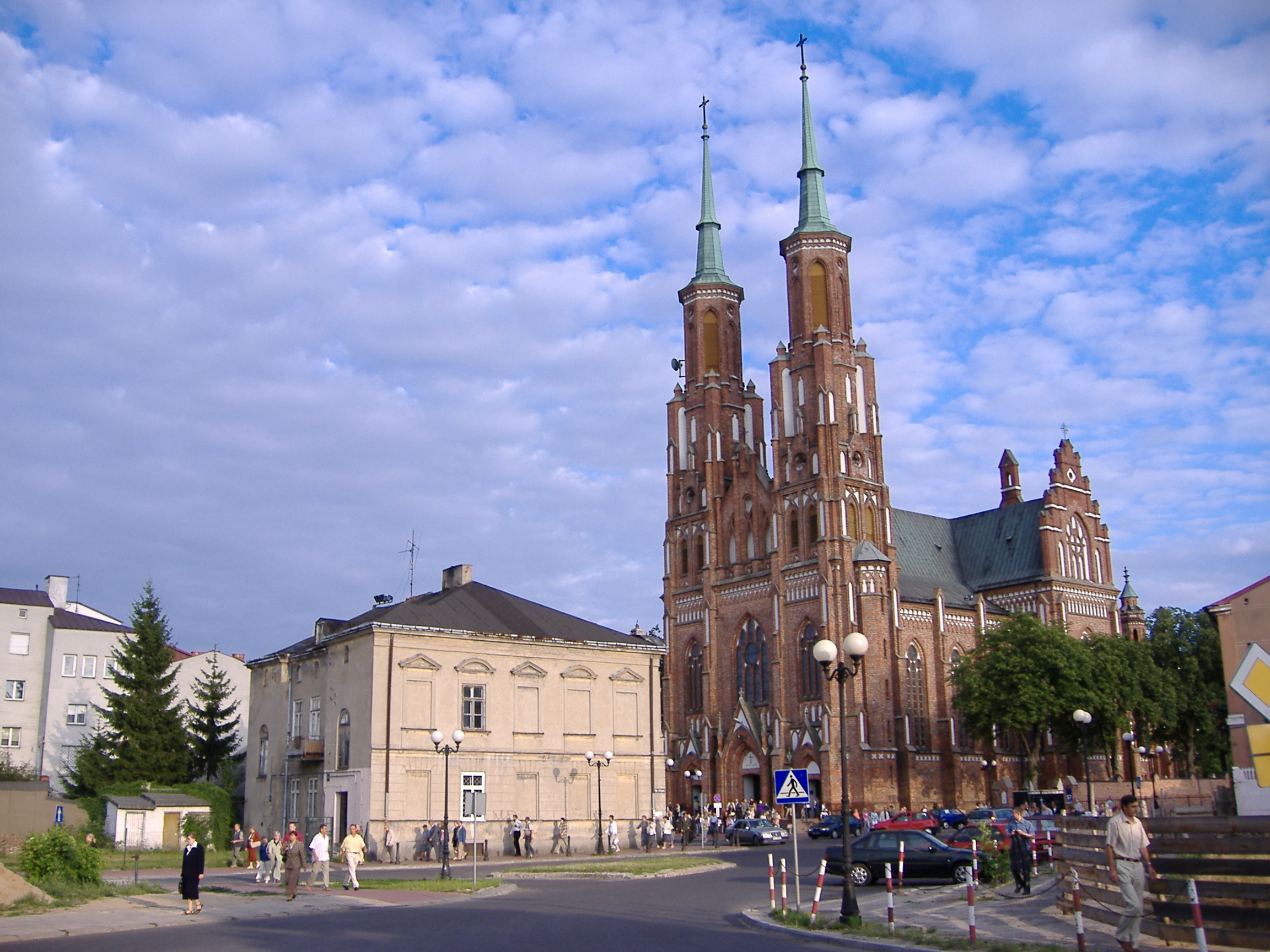
- Cathedral of the Immaculate Conception in Siedlce

Location
- Country: Poland
- Ecclesiastical province: Lublin
- Metropolitan: Archdiocese of Lublin

Statistics
- Area: 11,440 km^{2} (4,420 sq mi)
- Population: Total; Catholics: (as of 2020); 705,250; 695,940 (98.7%)

Information
- Denomination: Catholic Church
- Sui iuris church: Latin Church
- Rite: Roman Rite
- Cathedral: Katedra Niepokalanego Poczęcia NMP (Cathedral of the Immaculate Conception of the Blessed Virgin Mary)

Current leadership
- Pope: Leo XIV
- Bishop: Kazimierz Gurda
- Metropolitan Archbishop: Stanisław Budzik
- Auxiliary Bishops: Grzegorz Suchodolski

Map

Website
- Website of the Diocese

The Diocese of Siedlce (Latin: Siedlecen(sis)) is a Latin Church ecclesiastical territory or diocese of the Catholic Church in Poland. Its episcopal see is Siedlce. The Diocese of Siedlce is a suffragan diocese in the ecclesiastical province of the metropolitan Archdiocese of Lublin.

== History ==
- June 30, 1818: Established as Diocese of Podlachia
- 1867: Suppressed to Diocese of Lublin
- 1918: Restored as Diocese of Podlachia
- October 28, 1925: Renamed as Diocese of Siedlce

== Special churches ==
- Minor Basilicas:
  - Bazylika św. Anny (Sanktuarium Maryjne), Kodeń
    (Basilica of St. Ann)
  - Bazylika św. Jana Chrzciciela Sanktuarium Maryjne, Parczew
    ( Basilica of St. John the Baptist)
  - Sanktuarium Maryjne, Leśna Podlaska

== Leadership ==
- Bishops of Siedlce
  - Bishop Kazimierz Gurda (since 2014.05.24)
  - Bishop Zbigniew Kiernikowski (2002.03.28 – 2014.04.16)
  - Bishop Jan Wiktor Nowak (1996.03.25 – 2002.03.25)
  - Bishop Jan Mazur (1968.10.24 – 1996.03.25)
  - Bishop Ignacy Świrski (1946.04.12 – 1968.03.25)
  - Bishop Henryk Ignacy Przeździecki (1925.10.28 – 1939.05.09)
- Bishops of Podlachia (Roman rite)
  - Bishop Henryk Ignacy Przeździecki (1918.09.24 – 1925.10.28)
  - Bishop Piotr Paweł Beniamin Szymański (1856.09.18 – 1867)
  - Bishop Jan Marceli Gutkowski (1826.07.03 – 1842.05.19)
  - Bishop Feliks Łukasz Lewiński (1819.03.29 – 1825.04.05)

== See also ==
- Roman Catholicism in Poland
- Eugene Rozhitsky, an Eastern Orthodox (later the Byzantine Catholic) priest who served the diocese

== Sources ==
- GCatholic.org
- Catholic Hierarchy
- Diocese website
