= Przyszowice =

- Village
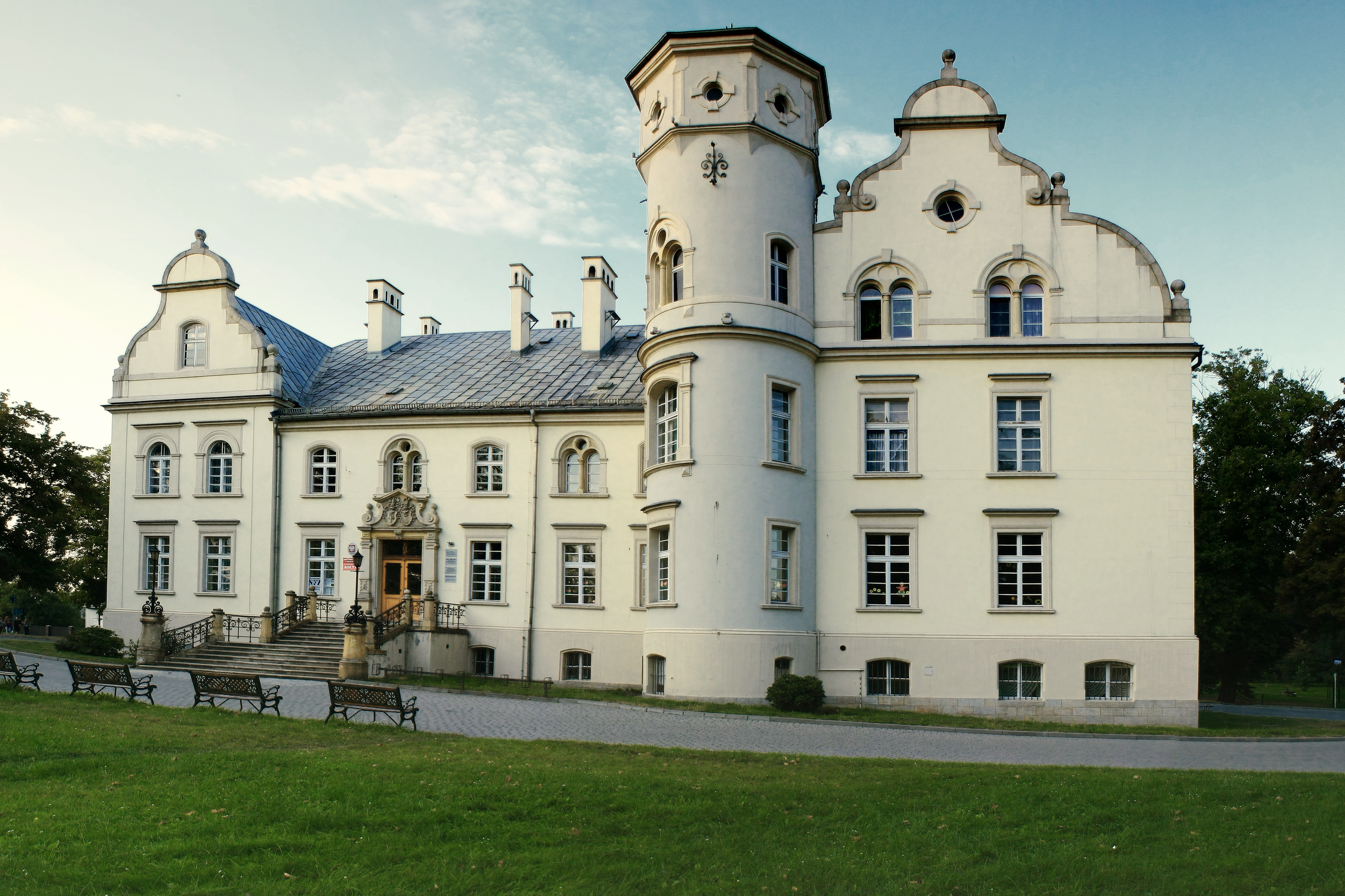
- Palace in Przyszowice

- Location within Poland
- Coordinates: 50°15′N 18°45′E
- Country: Poland
- Voivodeship: Silesian
- County: Gliwice
- Gmina: Gierałtowice

Population
  - Total: 3,199
- Time zone: UTC+1 (CET)
  - Summer (DST): UTC+2 (CEST)
- Vehicle registration: SGL
- Website: https://www.przyszowice.com/

Przyszowice [pʂɨʂɔˈvit͡sɛ] is a village in the administrative district of Gmina Gierałtowice, within Gliwice County, Silesian Voivodeship, in southern Poland.

Among the most notable landmarks of the area is an eclectic palace of the von Raczek family built between 1890 and 1895, the St. John of Nepomuk's Church built in 1938 and a wooden granary of 1829.

During the final stages of World War II the village was the site of the Przyszowice massacre in which roughly 70 Polish civilians were murdered by the Red Army.
