= Zbigniew Kiernikowski =

Polish Roman Catholic bishop (born 1946)

- Bishop emeritus of Legnica
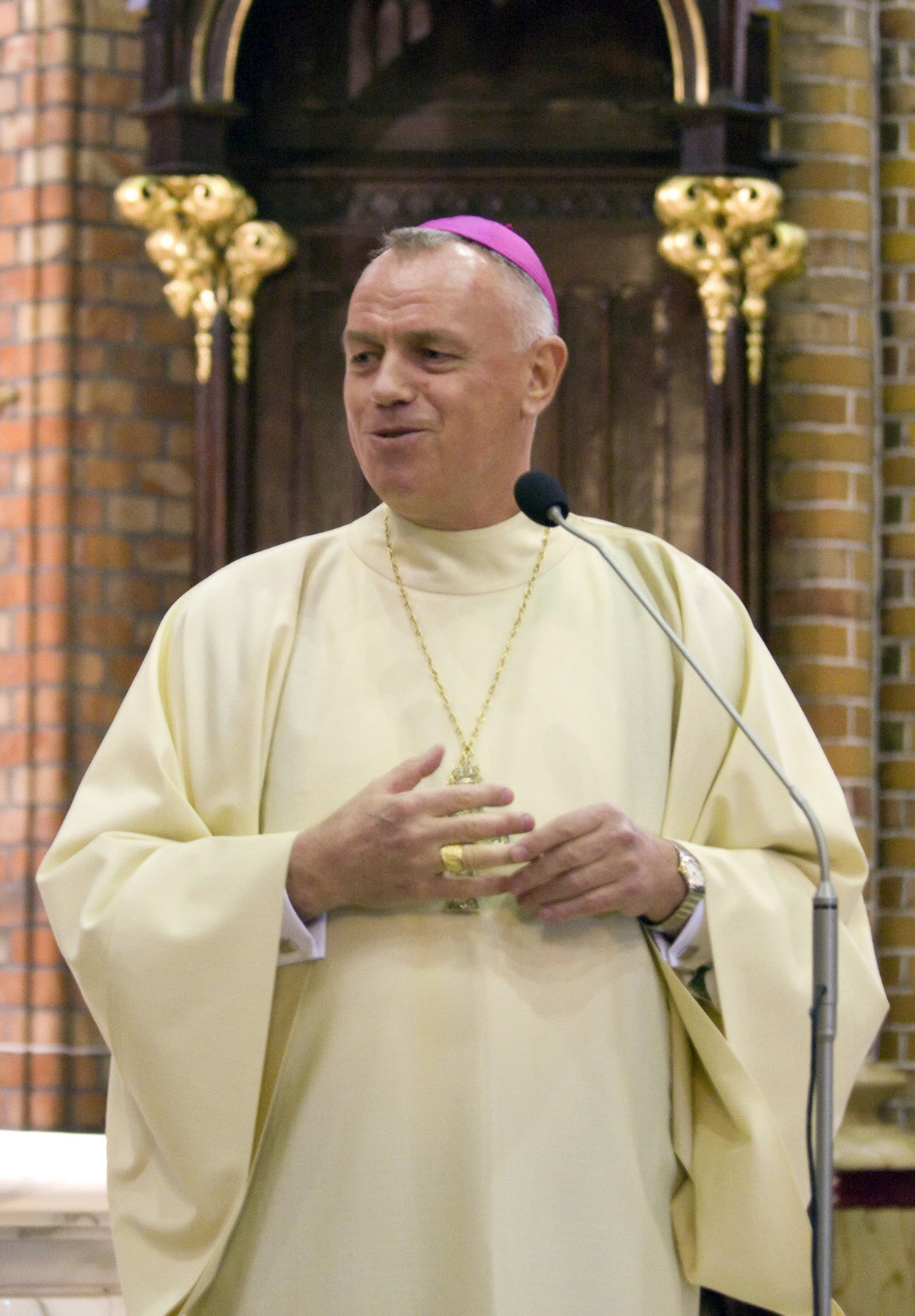
- Zbigniew Kiernikowski in March 2008
- Church: Roman Catholic Church
- Diocese: Legnica
- Other post(s): Bishop of Siedlce (2002 – 2014)

Orders
- Ordination: 6 June 1971
- Consecration: 28 March 2002 by Pope John Paul II

Personal details
- Motto: Evangelio oboedientia – Eucharistia
- Coat of arms

Zbigniew Kiernikowski (born 2 July 1946 in Szamarzewo) is a Polish prelate of the Catholic Church who was bishop of Legnica from 2014 to 2021 and of Siedlce from 2002 to 2014.

== Biography ==
Kiernikowski was ordained to the priesthood on 6 June 1971.

He completed a dissertation in Theology in 1983 at the Pontifical University of Saint Thomas Aquinas, Angelicum titled La crescita della comunità, Corpo di Cristo : l'identità e il dinamismo della vita cristiana rispecchiate nella dinamica del testo della Lettera ai Colossesi.

Kiernikowski was named bishop of Siedlce, Poland, on 28 March 2002. On 16 April 2014, he was named bishop of Legnica.

Pope Francis accepted his resignation on 28 June 2021, following his investigation by the Vatican into his negligence in a sexual abuse case.

== Honors and awards ==
=== National awards ===
- Poland:
  - Knight's Cross of the Order of Polonia Restituta (2009)
