= José Cerviño Cerviño =

- Bishop Emeritus of Diocese of Tui-Vigo
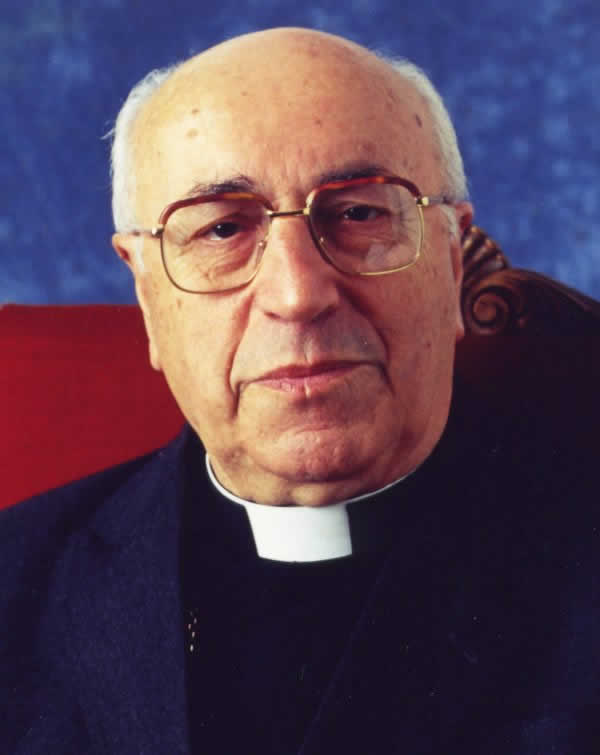
- Mons. José Cerviño Cerviño
- Church: Roman Catholic Church
- See: Diocese of Tui-Vigo
- In office: 1976 - 1996
- Predecessor: José Delicado Baeza
- Successor: José Diéguez Reboredo

Orders
- Ordination: April 6, 1946
- Consecration: July 28, 1968 by Cardinal Fernando Quiroga y Palacios

Personal details
- Born: August 21, 1920 Aldán, Spain
- Died: 18 April 2012 (aged 91) Vigo, Spain

José Cerviño Cerviño (August 21, 1920 – April 18, 2012) was a Spanish prelate of the Roman Catholic Church.

Cerviño was born in Aldán, Spain, and was ordained a priest on April 6, 1946, from the Archdiocese of Santiago de Compostela. Cerviño was appointed auxiliary bishop of the Archdiocese of Santiago de Compostela as well as titular bishop of Benepota on June 4, 1968, and ordained bishop on July 28, 1968. On November 8, 1976, Cerviño was appointed bishop of the Diocese of Tui-Vigo where he would serve until his retirement on June 7, 1996.

== See also ==
Roman Catholic Archdiocese of Santiago de Compostela
