= Osiedle Tysiąclecia =

District of Katowice

- Katowice District
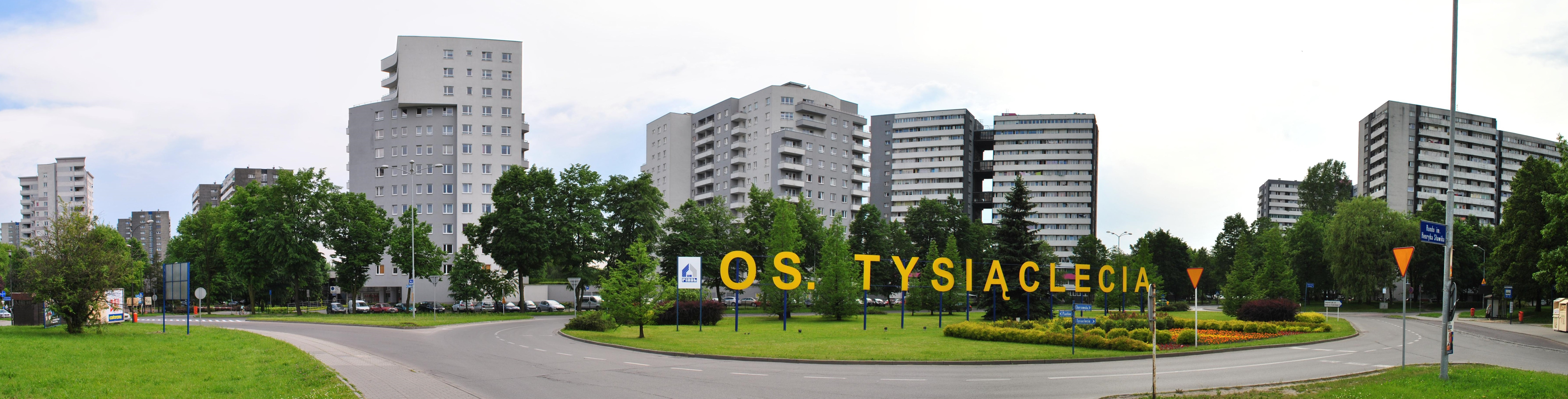

- Location of Osiedle Tysiąclecia within Katowice
- Coordinates: 50°16′45″N 18°58′24″E
- Country: Poland
- Voivodeship: Silesian
- County/City: Katowice
- Established: 1 January 1992

Area
  - Total: 1.88 km^{2} (0.73 sq mi)
- Elevation: 265–300 m (869–984 ft)

Population (2007)
  - Total: 23,501
  - Density: 12,480/km^{2} (32,300/sq mi)
- Time zone: UTC+1 (CET)
  - Summer (DST): UTC+2 (CEST)
- Area code: (+48) 032

Osiedle Tysiąclecia (Millennial District) is a housing estate and district of Katowice and one of the largest districts in Poland. It is located in the north-western part of the city, in the group of northern districts. The construction of the district began in 1961 during the times of the Polish People's Republic. The name was chosen in 1961, which was a 1000th anniversary of the founding of Poland.

The district is bordered by the town of Chorzów on the west, on the east by Bracka Street, on the south by the Rawa and Załęże district and on the north by Silesian Park (Park Śląski). The district mainly residential, formed by several dozen tall apartment buildings. The largest of those are the Kukurydze (Corn on the Cob) of 82 meters height (24 floors), which makes them the second tallest apartment buildings in Poland.

The area has been inhabited since the 17th century, when the colony of Dąb, Sośnina, was established along the Rawa stream. In the 19th century, the hamlet of Dąb, Bederowiec, was built on Chorzowska Street, while between 1947 and 1950, a colony of Finnish houses, Osiedle Wincentego Pstrowskiego, was established within Chorzów, in the area of present-day Upper Tysiąclecie. It was designed by four architects: Henryk Buszko, Aleksander Franta, Marian Dziewoński, and Tadeusz Szewczyk, the first two of whom later supervised the construction.

Osiedle Tysiąclecia is very well connected thanks to Drogowa Trasa Średnicowa and national road 79 (Chorzowska Street, along with the tram line running parallel to the street), which pass along the outer edge of the district. It has an area of 1.88 km^{2} (1.14% of Katowice's total area), and in 2007 had 23,501 inhabitants (7.4% of the city's population).

== Geography ==
=== Location ===
Osiedle Tysiąclecia is one of Katowice's administrative districts (no. 9), belonging to the group of northern districts. It borders Dąb to the east, Załęże to the south, and the city of Chorzów to the west and north (including the Centrum district and Silesian Park). The district's boundary runs as follows:

- from the north – behind the tracks on Chorzowska Street, at the border with Silesian Park (city boundary);
- from the east – along the boundary of land owned by the Piast Housing Cooperative west of Bracka Street to the Rawa river;
- from the south – along the center of the Rawa riverbed;
- from the west – behind the eastern properties of Wojska Polskiego Avenue and Jan Gałeczka Street in Chorzów, then along Jan Gałeczka Street (city boundary).

Historically, Osiedle Tysiąclecia is located partly within the territory of the former Gmina Dąb (Lower Tysiąclecie and part of Upper Tysiąclecie). According to Jerzy Kondracki's physio-geographical regionalization, the district is located in the Katowice Upland mesoregion, which forms the southern part of the Silesian Upland. The Silesian Upland itself is a part of the Silesian-Kraków Upland.

=== Geology and soils ===
Osiedle Tysiąclecia is located in the Upper Silesian Sinkhole, which forms the northern part of the large Silesian-Moravian geological structure. It is filled with Upper Carboniferous strata, mainly the coal-bearing deposits of the Ruda layers (Westphalian A), which lie within the Palaeozoic structures of the Central Polish Uplands. Beneath the sedimentary series of the Upper Silesian Sinkhole lie Precambrian crystalline rocks. Above them are diabases covered by 100 m of terrestrial sediments, consisting mainly of sandstones and conglomerates. Above these lies a 200-meter-thick Early Cambrian layer (fine-grained sandstone and mudstone), covered by Early Devonian sandstones. These layers, together with Carboniferous sediments, are covered in the southern part by Quaternary formations, mainly of glacial origin, formed during the Mindel glaciation. They consist of till, its weathered products, and glacial sands and gravels, and in the southern part also river sediments. A large part of the sedimentary layer consists of embankment fills of anthropogenic origin with an average thickness of up to 2 meters (over 5 meters in Lower Tysiąclecie and over 6 meters in Upper Tysiąclecie).

The Upper Silesian Sinkhole is characterized by poorly developed fold tectonics, while the strata in the area of Katowice (including Osiedle Tysiąclecia) lie horizontally, which is caused by the presence of a rigid crystalline massif (the Upper Silesian Block) beneath the basin. This area is highly distorted as a result of mining activity. Before the construction of the housing estate, it was classified as Category V for mining damage due to numerous irregularities and faults, as well as underground mine tunnels, which largely contributed to the final layout of the area.

The soils in Osiedle Tysiąclecia have been subjected to significant anthropogenic pressure due to urban development, resulting in a high proportion of initial soils in the area. The soils there are mainly anthrosols, formed from tills. The soils in the district have a soil quality rating of Class IV. They are contaminated with heavy metals (lead, cadmium, and zinc), which originate from industrial pollution resulting from coal combustion in neighboring districts.

=== Terrain ===
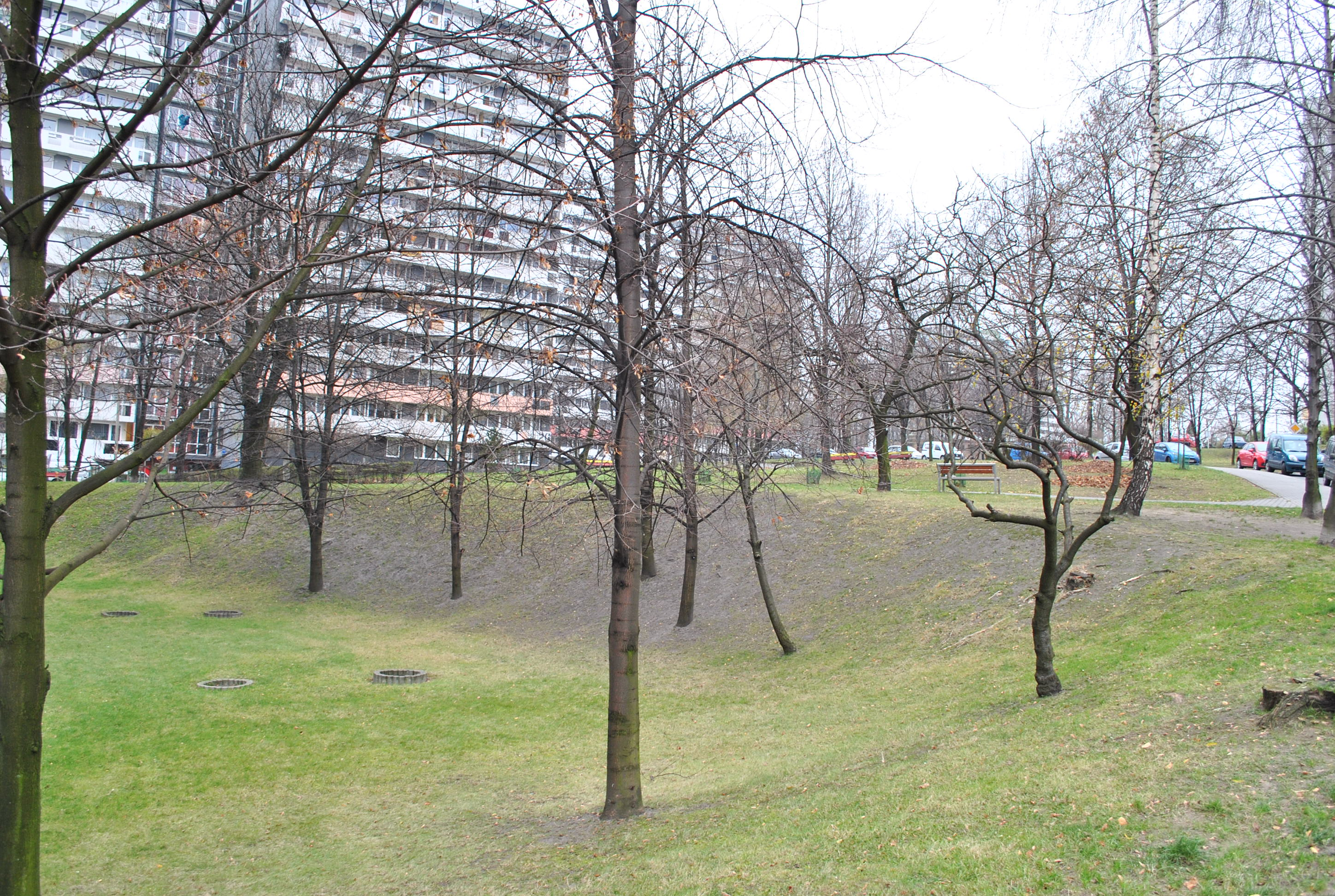
Escarpment near Bolesław Chrobry Street, formed as a result of residential development (2014)

Based on morphological units, the vast majority of Osiedle Tysiąclecia is located on the Chorzów Hills, which consist of a series of undulating, rounded, or flattened elevations that reach up to 299 meters above sea level within the district. The slope of the Chorzów Hills stretches along Chorzowska Street to the Rawa river valley. It is cut by valley depressions. The flattened areas of the hills are composed of Carboniferous rocks, partially covered by a thin layer from the Pleistocene.

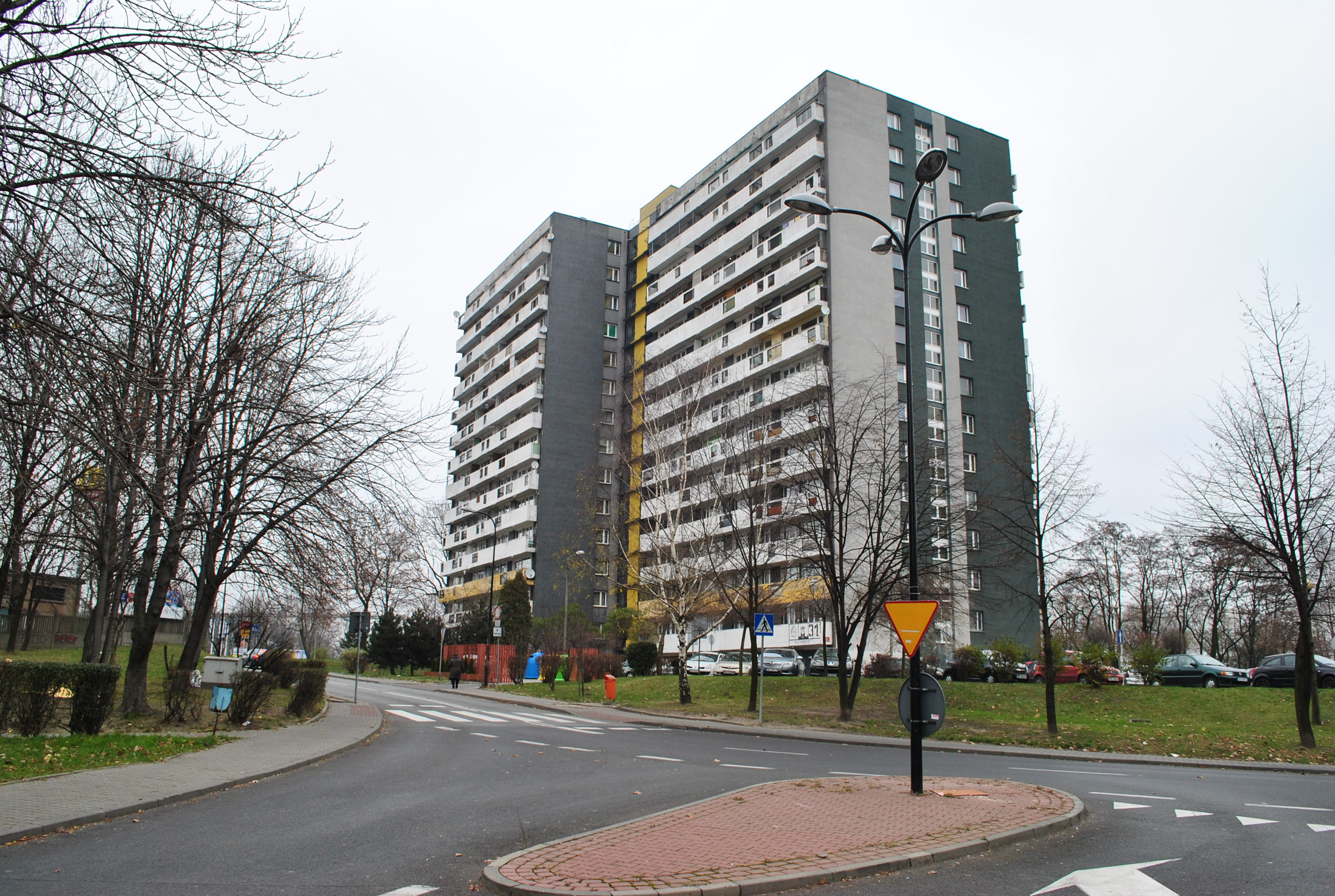
Building at 31 Bolesław Chrobry Street – one of the highest-situated buildings on the estate, at an elevation of almost 300 m above sea level (2014)

The district slopes downward toward the southwest and south. The southern part, stretching along the Rawa river valley and Bederowiec Park, is located in the Rawa Depression. It is deeply incised (over 100 m) into Carboniferous strata and forms the valley floor along with a Pleistocene terrace. The surface of Maroko Pond is located at an elevation of 264.9 m above sea level, while the level of the Rawa river at the border of Dąb, Osiedle Tysiąclecia, and Załęże is 264.7 m above sea level. The elevation difference between the highest and lowest points in the district is almost 35 meters.

The area of the district has been significantly altered by human activity, mainly through the construction of road embankments and distortions resulting from residential development. The changes in the topography of Osiedle Tysiąclecia are largely influenced by processes of leveling, sedimentation, and the settling of various materials.

=== Climate ===
The climatic conditions of Osiedle Tysiąclecia differ only slightly from those of Katowice as a whole. They are influenced by both climatic and local factors, as well as by human activity (e.g. the urban heat island effect). The district's climate is largely influenced by oceanic factors, which predominate over continental influences, as well as by tropical air masses that occasionally reach the area from the southwest through the Moravian Gate.

The average annual temperature in Katowice for the 1961–2005 period was 8.1 °C. The warmest month is July (17.8 °C), and the coldest is January (–2.2 °C). The average annual sunshine duration for the 1966–2005 period was 1,474 hours, while the average annual precipitation for the 1951–2005 period was 713.8 mm. The average duration of snow cover is 60–70 days, and the growing season lasts an average of 200–220 days. Throughout the year, westerly and southwesterly winds prevail, while northerly winds are the least frequent. The average wind speed is 2.4 m/s.

=== Hydrography and hydrogeology ===
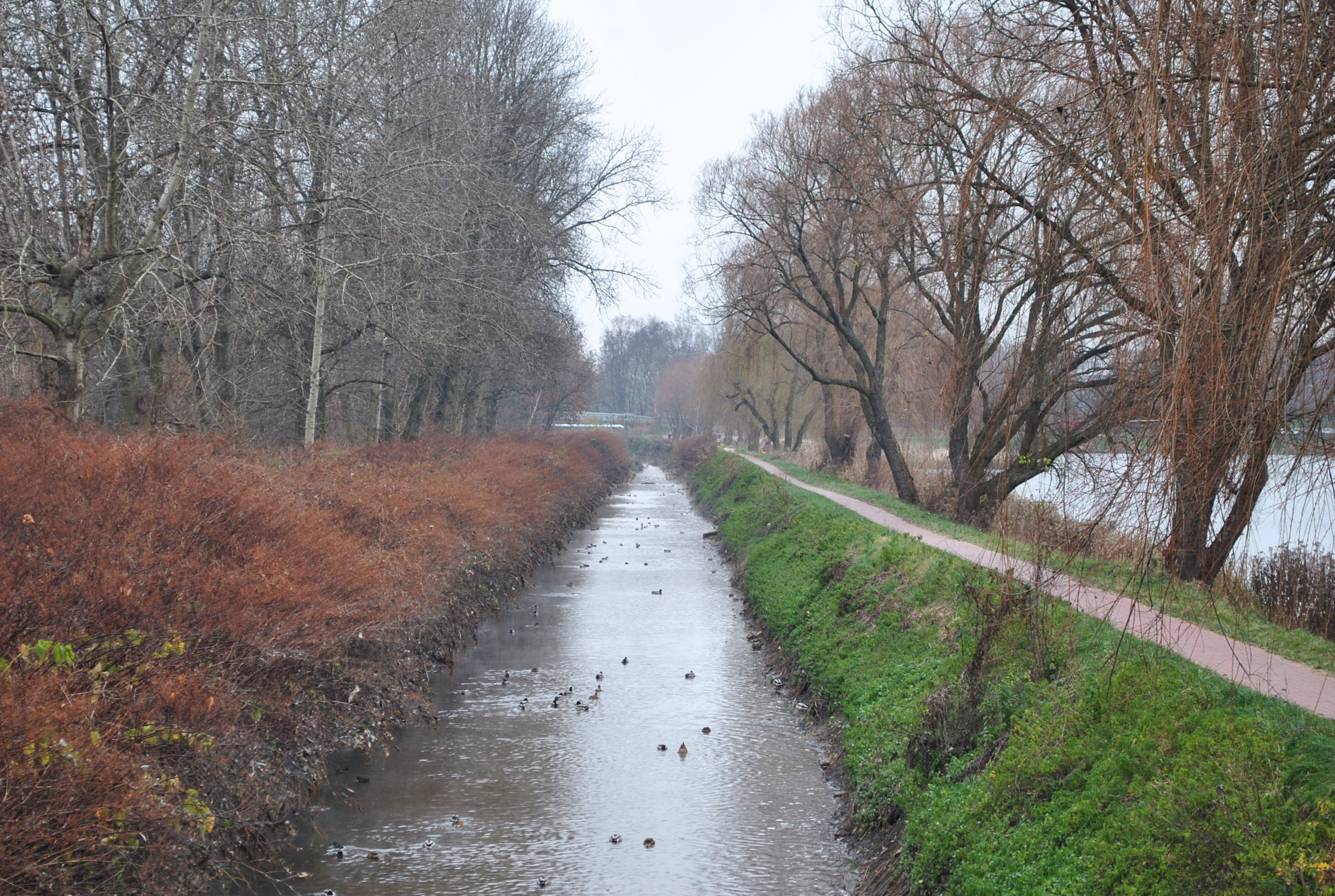
Rawa river on the boundary of Osiedle Tysiąclecia and Załęże near Maroko Pond (2014)

Osiedle Tysiąclecia is located entirely within the left bank of the Vistula drainage basin, in the basin of the Rawa river. This river, a tributary of the Czarna Przemsza, flows from west to east within the housing estate. Its entire course is regulated and it is embanked. It serves as a receiving body for treated and untreated wastewater as well as stormwater. Between 1992 and 2002, the proportion of external water (municipal and industrial wastewater) was approximately 70%, which caused significant disruption to the natural flow. The groundwater level in the river valley is low, although its depths within the district can vary significantly due to the diversity of the subsoil, the district's sewer system, and the lining of the Rawa riverbed.

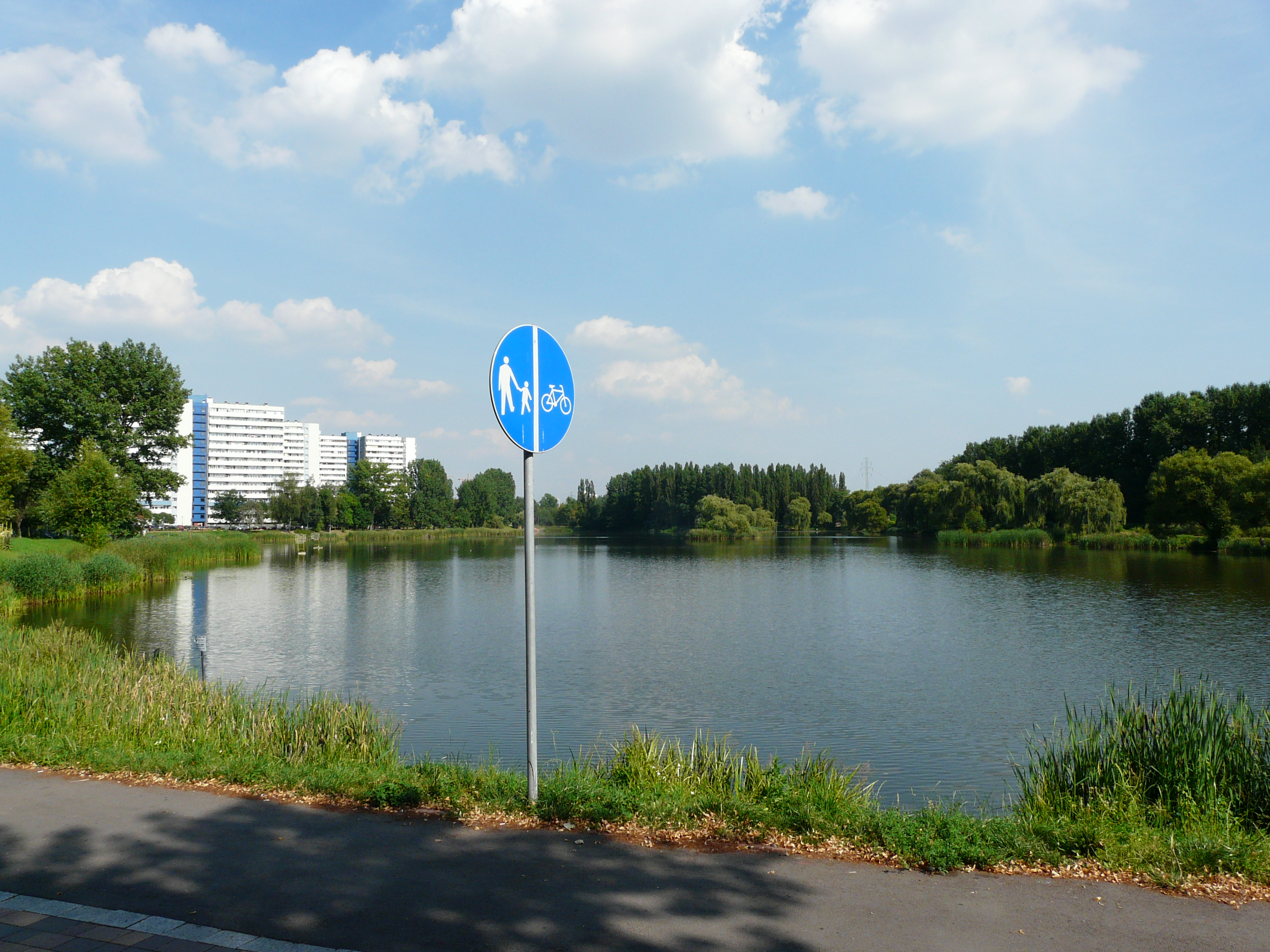
Maroko Pond from the western side (2013)

The largest body of water in the district is Maroko Pond, which was formed in a flooded post-industrial excavation site. It covers an area of 8.4 hectares and has an average depth of 1.3 meters. The pond serves as a refuge for many plant and animal species and is also a recreational site. To the west of the pond lies a marshy area overgrown with reeds. Both areas were formerly part of the Stawy na Tysiącleciu ecological reserve.

Osiedle Tysiąclecia is located within the Silesian-Kraków hydrogeological region. Aquifers are present there in all stratigraphic layers, but their significance depends on geological and hydrogeological factors, as well as human influence. Larger complexes are found in the Rawa and Kłodnica river valleys. Osiedle Tysiąclecia is also located within the Main Groundwater Reservoir No. 329 Bytom, which is of karst-fissured character, but it does not contain exploitable resources within the district.

=== Nature and environmental protection ===
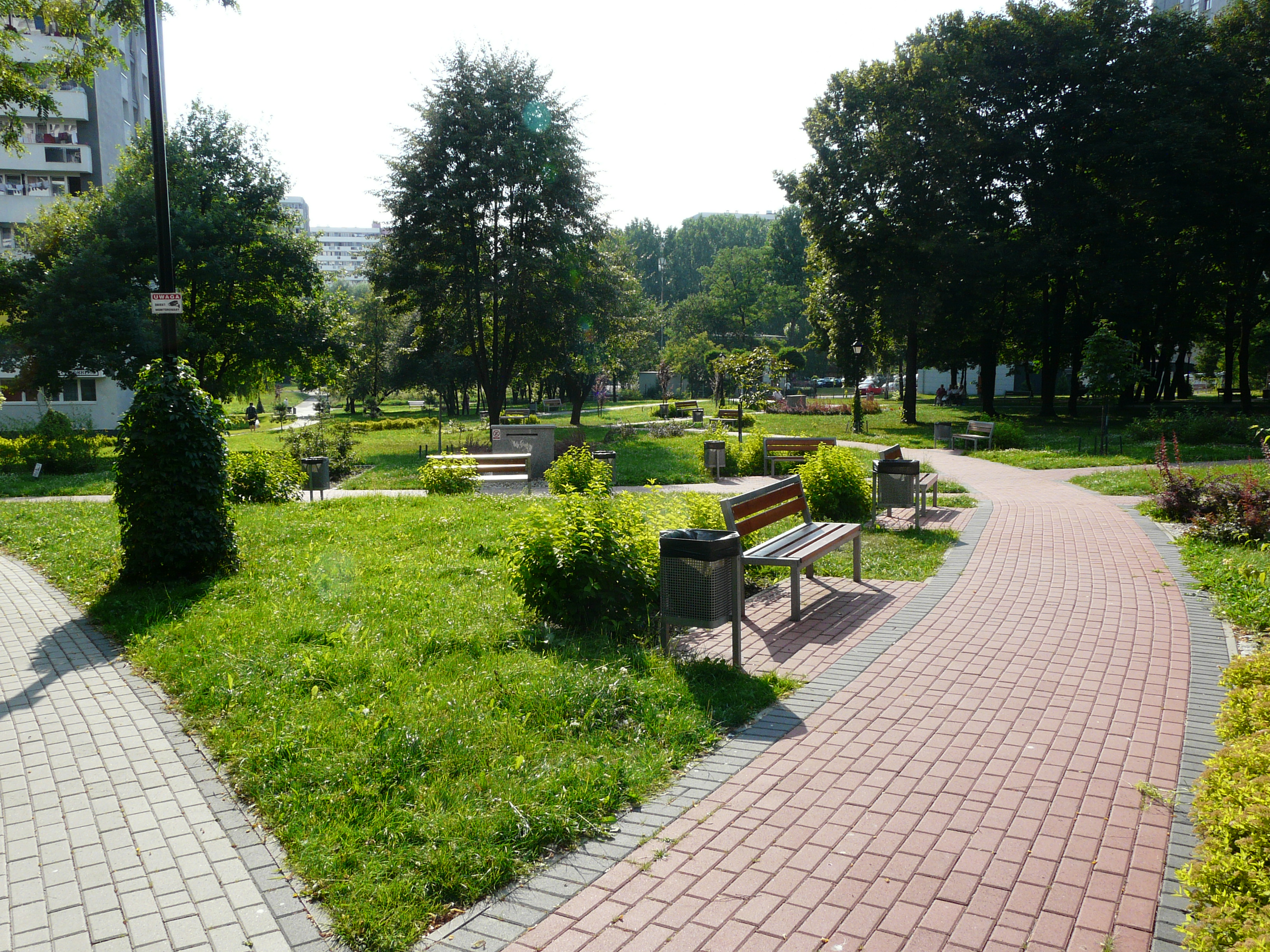
One of the squares at the estate (2013)

Despite its high population density, the district is characterized by a significant proportion of green spaces, mainly due to its proximity to two large green complexes – the former ecological reserve Stawy na Tysiącleciu (since 2012, the eastern part of the former complex has been Bederowiec Park) along with the forest complex (in the southern and southwestern parts of the district) and Silesian Park (outside the city limits; north of the housing estate). The main forms of green space within Osiedle Tysiąclecia are landscaped and residential green areas. A distinctive element of the district is the absence of allotment gardens.

The former ecological reserve known as Stawy na Tysiącleciu serves as a refuge for many plant and animal species. It is home to a variety of amphibians in particular (such as the fire-bellied toad, smooth newt, and pool frog), as well as one of the last remaining habitats of the grass snake in Katowice. The reed beds in the western part of the area are home to muskrats, moorhens, mallards, coots, and sedge warblers.

The residential part of the housing estate is home to typical synanthropic species, such as the rock dove, house sparrow, collared dove, swift, jackdaw, magpie, and blackbird. The development of fauna in Osiedle Tysiąclecia is influenced by the presence of forest, meadow, aquatic, and riparian communities. Human activity has a significant impact on the plant species composition, resulting in the presence of synanthropic and ruderal vegetation there.

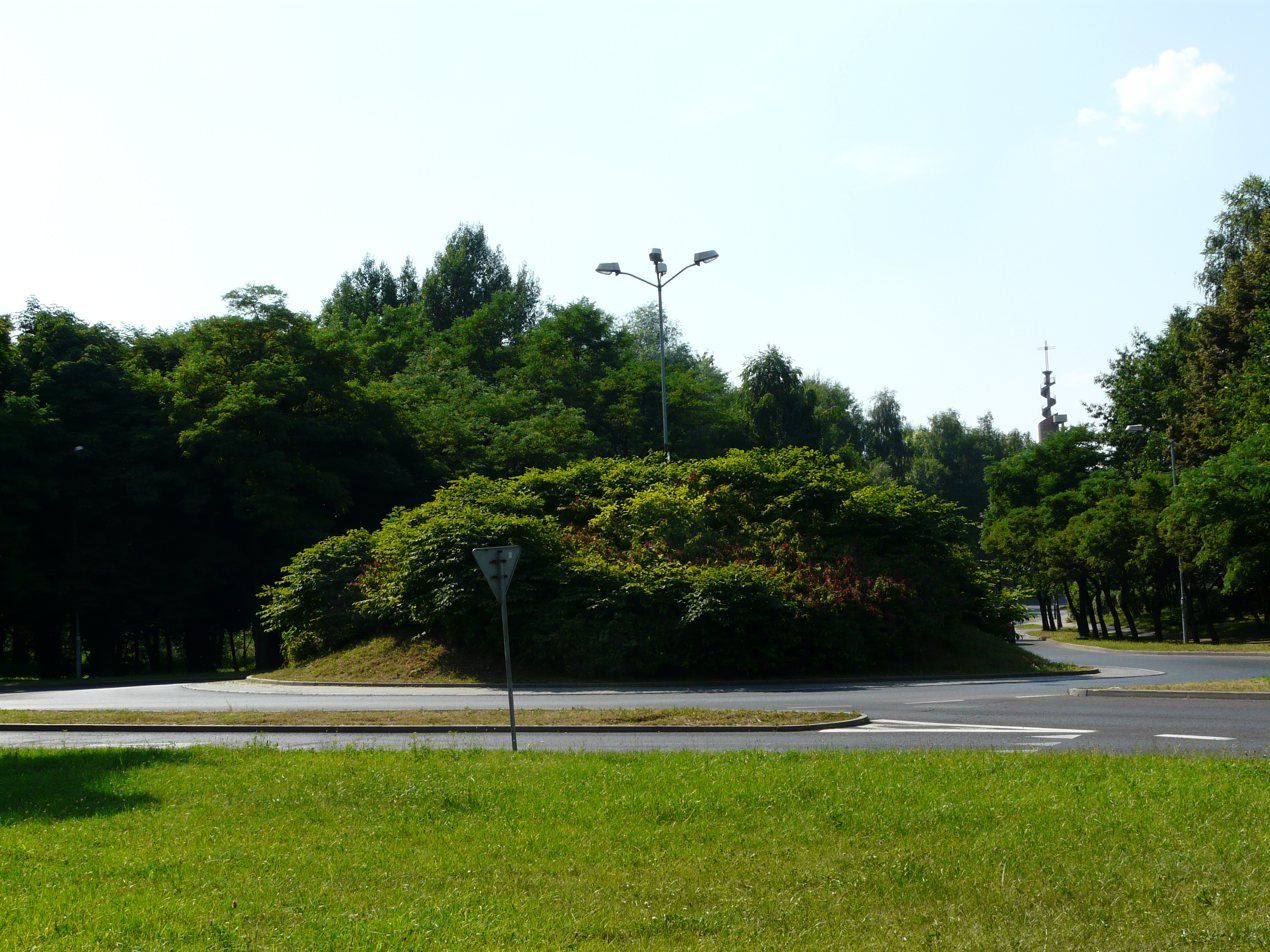
Karol Stryja Roundabout (2013)

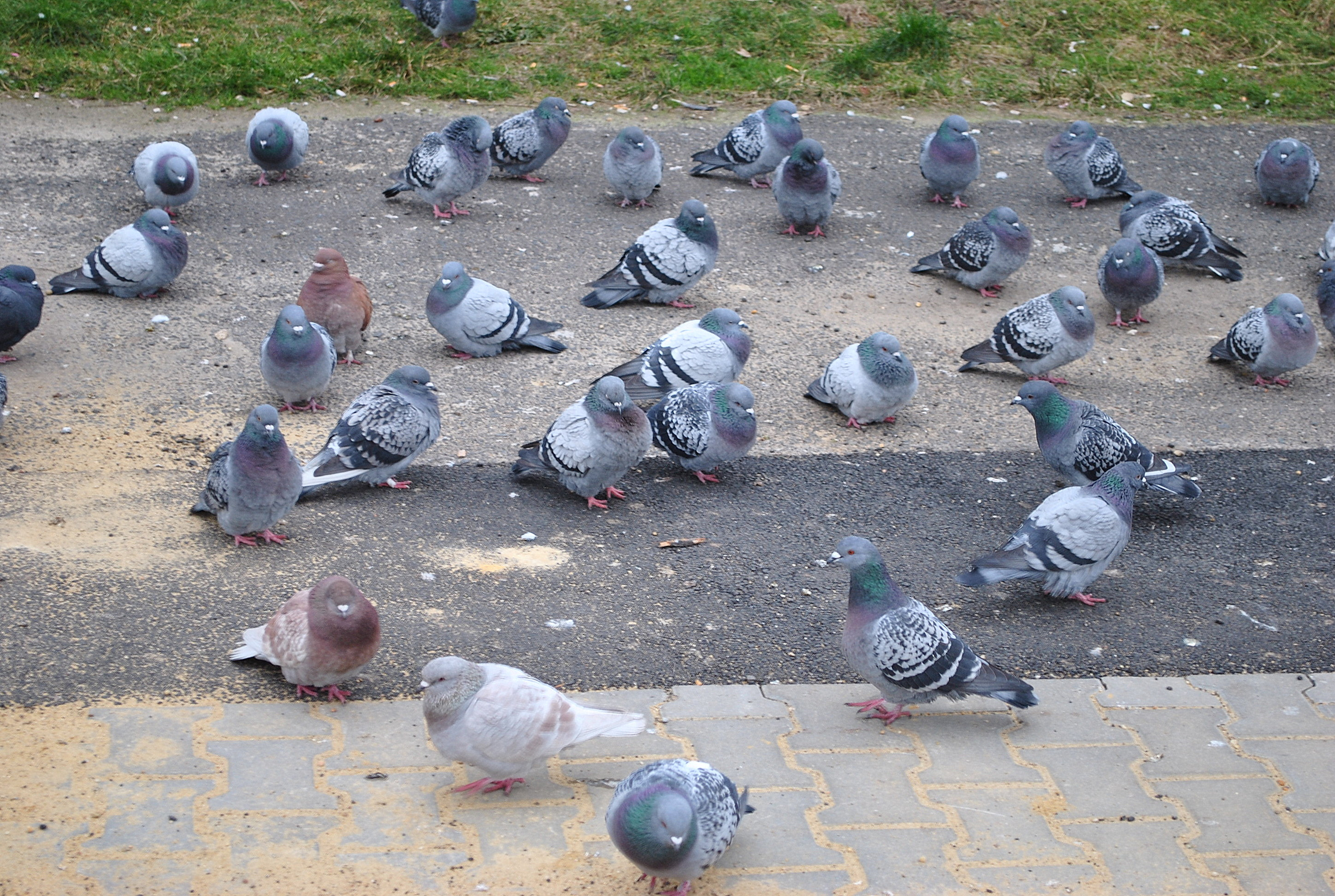
Group of feral pigeons near Osiedle Tysiąclecia (2014)

The following squares and landscaped green areas are located within the boundaries of Osiedle Tysiąclecia:

- Bederowiec Park – encompasses Maroko Pond and its immediate surroundings. It is located in Lower Tysiąclecie, near Piastów and John Paul II streets;
- Karol Hieronim Chodkiewicz Square – square between the apartment buildings at 86a and 90 Tysiąclecia Street;
- Polish Hussars Square – square between the apartment buildings at 92 Tysiąclecia Street and the Church of Our Lady of Piekary on Ułańska Street;
- Tadeusz Jasiński Square – square on Bolesław Krzywousty Avenue, between the apartment buildings at 37 and 45 Tysiąclecia Street;
- Jan Matejko Square – square on Bolesław Chrobry Street, between the apartment buildings at 78 Tysiąclecia and 2 Bolesław Chrobry streets;
- Ostashkov Prisoners Square – square in the area of Chorzowska, Ułańska, and Bolesław Chrobry streets;
- Józef Kidoń Square – square in the area of Chorzowska Street, Bolesław Chrobry Street, and Henryk Pobożny Avenue;
- Lviv Cadets Square – square on Bolesław Krzywousty Avenue, in the area of apartment buildings at 7 and 11 Tysiąclecia Street;
- Oświęcim Martyrs Square – square at the junction of Mieszko I and John Paul II streets, in the area of the Konstanty Wolny Roundabout;
- Romuald Mielczarski Square – square on Piastów Avenue, between the building of Primary School No. 66 and the apartment building on Piastów Street;
- Young Artists Square – square on Jadwiga of Silesia Avenue, between the Arts Schools Complex and apartment buildings at 7 and 9 Ułańska Street;
- Robert Oszek Square – square at the junction of Mieszko I and Tysiąclecia streets, in the area of Karol Stryja Roundabout;
- Silesian Piasts Square – square between Chorzowska Street and Henryk Brodaty Avenue, in the area of Henryk Sławik Roundabout;
- Exaltation of the Cross Square – square on Mieszko I Street, between the Church of the Exaltation of the Holy Cross and Our Lady Health of the Sick and the cemetery grounds;
- Ronald Reagan Square – square on Bolesław Krzywousty Avenue;
- Józef Ryszka Square – square between Chorzowska and Piastów streets, in the area of Henryk Sławik Roundabout;
- Chevau-légers Square – square between the apartment buildings at 88, 90, and 92 Tysiąclecia Street;
- Tysiąclecie Loop – square encompassing the bus loop area along Tysiąclecia Street;
- Piotr Urbańczyk Square – square on Jadwiga of Silesia Avenue, between the ambulance station, police juvenile detention facility, and apartment buildings at 9 and 13 Bolesław Chrobry Street;
- Janusz Korczak Pupils Square – square on Piastów Avenue, between the Primary School No. 66 and the apartment building on Piastów Street.

== History ==
=== Background ===
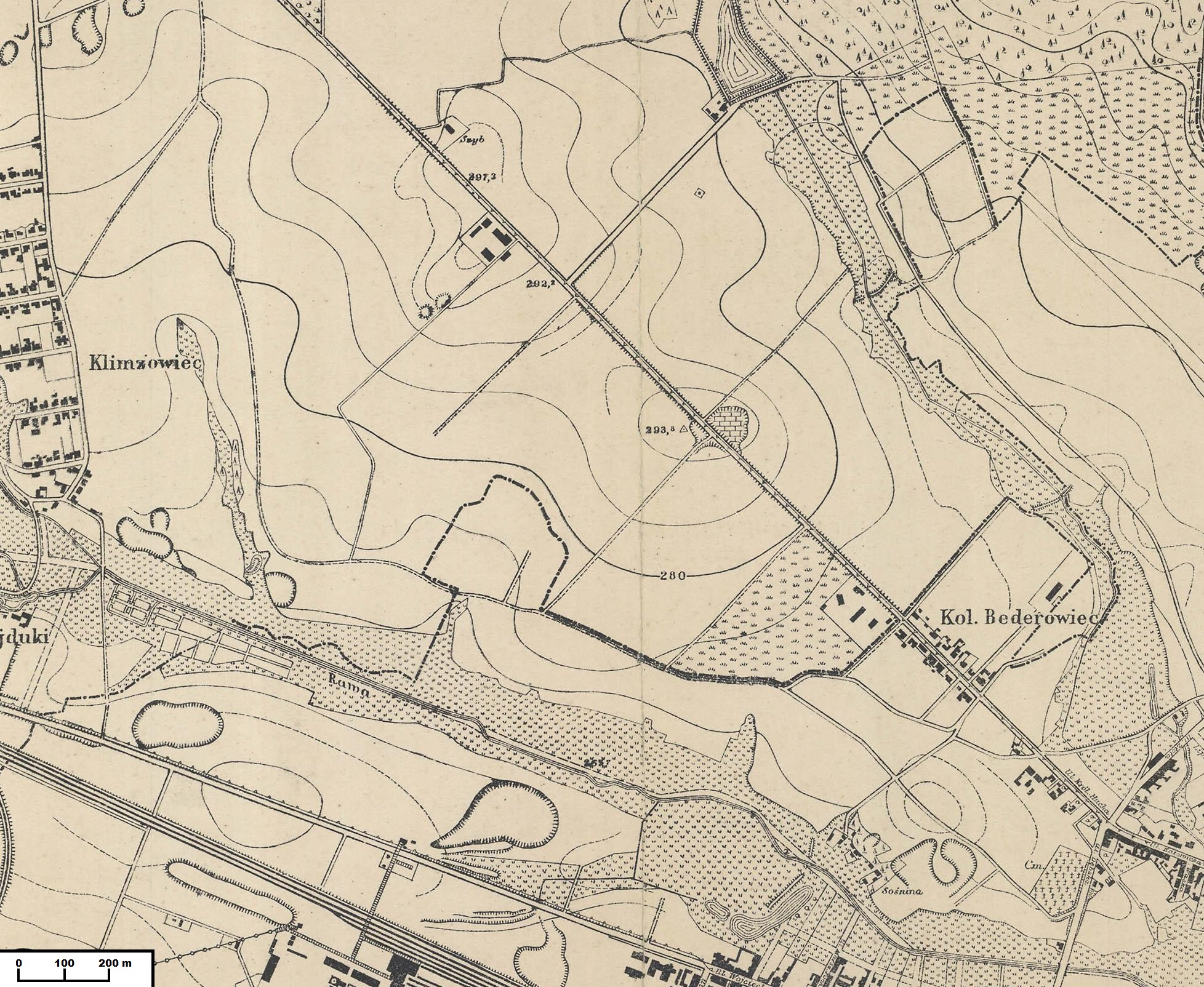
Map from 1926 showing the present-day Osiedle Tysiąclecia; at that time, this area included the Bederowiec and Sośnina settlements, as well as Szosa Chorzowska (now Chorzowska Street) along with a tram line. It shows only the boundary of Katowice, without the boundary separating Królewska Huta from Chorzów Stary and Wielkie Hajduki

The origins of settlement in Osiedle Tysiąclecia date back to the 17th century, when the Sośnina colony was established in present-day Lower Tysiąclecie (then part of the village of Dąb). Iron ore was mined in this colony for the forges in Załęże. With the closure of the forges around the 18th century, the settlement became mainly agricultural.

Further settlement development in the district took place in the first half of the 19th century, when the colony of Bederowiec was established in Dąb in 1826 by the parish priest of Chorzów, Father Józef Beder. Originally, it was an agricultural settlement, and by the end of the 19th century, there were two large steam-powered facilities there – a mechanical carpentry shop and a mill. In 1890, the hamlet had 250 residents.

In the part of the current Osiedle Tysiąclecia, which belonged to Gmina Chorzów Stary in the 19th century, a quarry was established in the middle of the royal forest (at the top of the hill crossed by present-day Chorzowska Street, near the Kukurydze residential buildings), which remained in operation until the 1940s. To the east of this forest, a folwark was built in the early 20th century (on the south side of present-day Chorzowska Street, opposite the current western tram terminus), operating until the 1960s as the Chorzów State Farm. On 25 November 1898, a narrow-gauge tram line was launched along what is now Chorzowska Street, running from the Market Square to Dąb and Królewska Huta.

In 1924, Bederowiec and Sośnina (along with Dąb) were incorporated into Katowice, while the former Chorzów Stary folwark (which became the Chorzów State Farm after World War II) remained within the boundaries of present-day Chorzów until 1968. During the Great Depression of the 1920s and 1930s, primitive shacks for the unemployed and homeless were built in Bederowiec. Due to the lack of electricity and sewage systems, the area was nicknamed, among other things, "Morocco" and "Egypt". After World War II, between 1947 and 1950, directly to the west of the former Chorzów Stary folwark (now part of Upper Tysiąclecie), a workers' housing estate was built for miners of the Prezydent Shaft in Chorzów, consisting of Finnish-style houses.

=== Origins, design, and construction ===
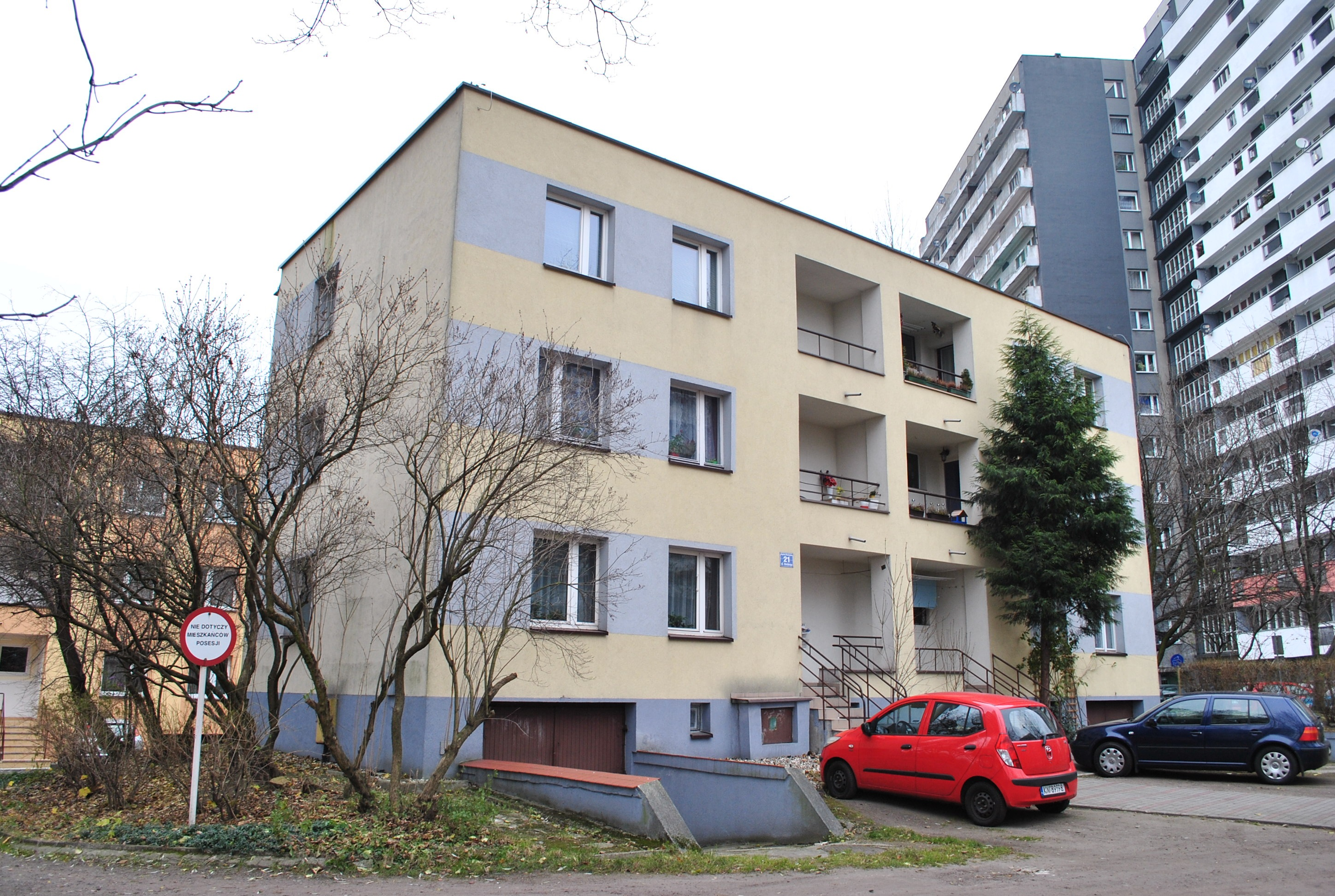
First buildings of Osiedle Tysiąclecia (on Bolesław Chrobry Street; in the center and on the left of the photo), built between 1958 and 1960 (2014)

Before construction began, Osiedle Tysiąclecia consisted mainly of farmland, as well as the remains of farm buildings on the estate and a settlement inhabited by the city's poor. The area was also marred by mining damage and suffered from severe air pollution. Its main advantage, however, was its transport connections . The decision to build a new housing estate for 20,000 people on the border between Katowice and Chorzów was made on 7 July 1959 by the Presidium of the Voivodeship National Council. Later, the target number of residents increased to 30,000. The housing estate's design was to be selected through a competition, and the then-voivode, Jerzy Ziętek, emphasized that the estate should have exemplary economic, technical, and spatial solutions. Three entries were submitted to the competition, and the concept by Henryk Buszko, Aleksander Franta, Marian Dziewoński, and Tadeusz Szewczyk from the Voivodeship General Construction Design Studio in Katowice was selected for implementation. Supervision of the housing estate's construction was later carried out by Buszko and Franta.

The location and general character of Osiedle Tysiąclecia were shaped by the following factors:

- overcrowding of the existing housing infrastructure;
- the need to build a new housing estate in the central part of the Upper Silesian Industrial Region to dispel the myth of the region's deglomeration – during the Polish People's Republic era, new housing estates were built mainly on the outskirts of the agglomeration, such as in Tychy and Pyskowice;
- mining damage – this necessitated the construction of the housing estate in two separate building groups;
- air pollution – after a study of climatic conditions, this required the construction of high-rise and point-block buildings to eliminate the phenomenon of stagnant, polluted air, as well as other architectural solutions, including orienting longer walls along a north-south axis and eliminating residential functions on the lowest level of the housing estate.

The original plan from between 1956 and 1959 called for the construction of a 145-hectare housing estate, which was ultimately intended to house 45,000 residents. It was to consist of five urban districts – the Lower Housing Estate, the Service Center, the Central Housing Estate, the Upper Housing Estate, and the Western Housing Estate. Among these, three service centers and three educational centers were also planned. The housing estate, partly due to its proximity to the then-Voivodeship Park of Culture and Recreation, was designed as a city within a city. Due to numerous faults and unevenness caused by mining damage, the area was subjected to an expert assessment by the Institute of Construction Organization and Mechanization, as a result of which the construction of 12-story buildings was permitted, which were raised by two stories based on the opinion of the Ministry of Municipal Economy.

Construction of the housing estate began in 1961, first with the low-rise buildings of the Lower Housing Estate (on the site of Bederowiec and Sośnina), and later with 14-story residential buildings for approximately 25,000 people (including low-rise buildings), two elementary schools, four kindergartens, a nursery, a student dormitory, and commercial pavilions. The first apartments were completed in 1964. The expansion of the housing estate proceeded in a northwesterly direction. A Service Center with commercial pavilions was built in the central part, followed by the Upper Housing Estate (Bolesław Chrobry Street and the final section of Tysiąclecia Street) and, right on the city limits, the Western Housing Estate (opposite the Silesian Stadium, on the site of Osiedle Pstrowskie, with 8 buildings for 7,000 residents), which were built by 1982 on the territory of Chorzów, incorporated into Katowice in 1968.

=== Further development ===
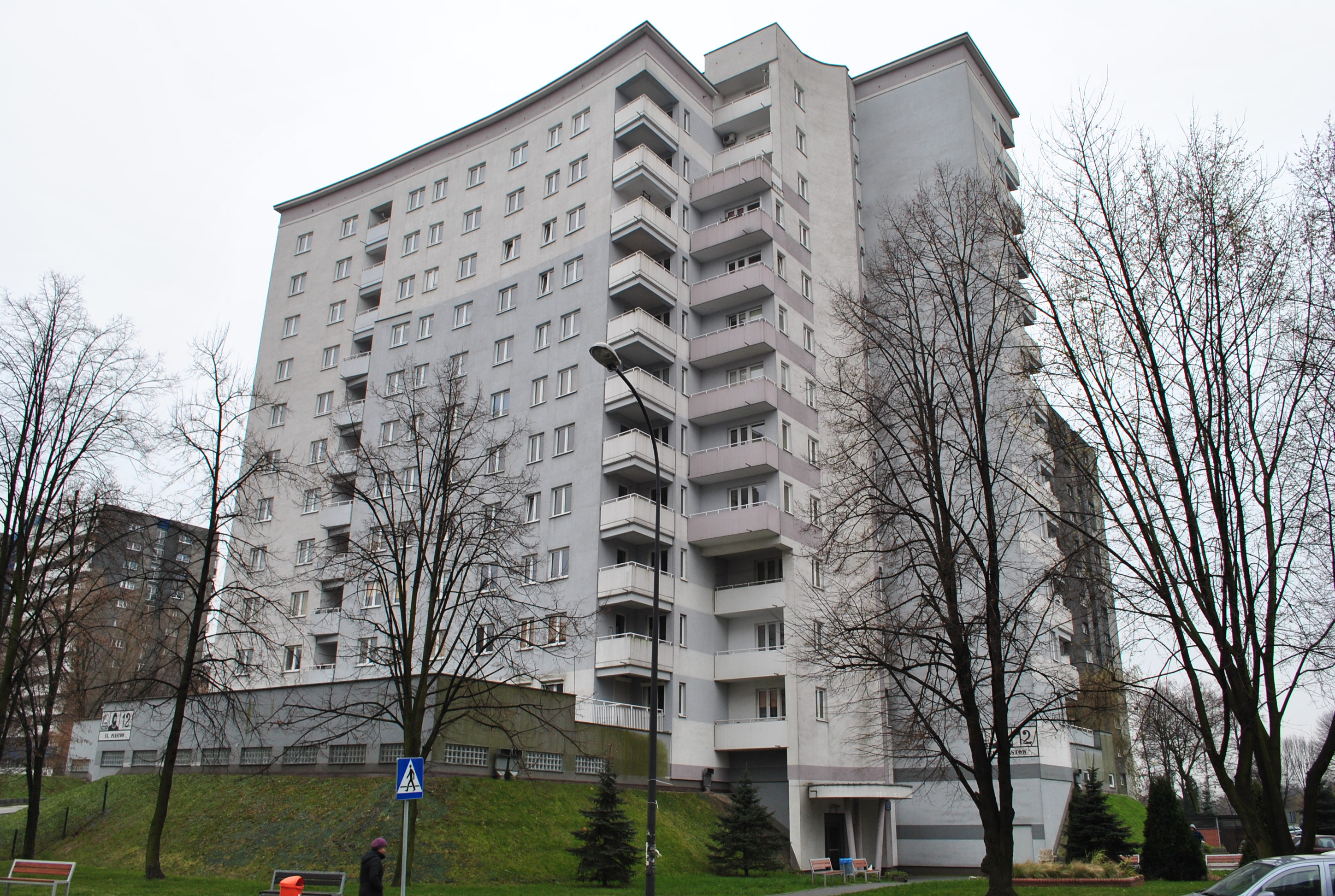
Building at 12 Piastów Street, completed in 2006 (2014)

The original housing estate, completed in 1982, was subsequently expanded with new buildings, which vary in their architectural harmony with the rest of the area. In the mid-1980s, construction began on the Central Housing Estate, consisting of five residential buildings for approximately 4,000 inhabitants – Kukurydze, which are among the largest residential buildings in Katowice.

According to the original plans, there was not supposed to be a Roman Catholic church in the housing estate, which is why the residents, with the support of then-Archbishop Karol Wojtyła, campaigned for the construction of a church for over a decade. Ultimately, a site near the Lower Tysiąclecie was selected for the construction. The estate's main architects began design work on the Church of the Exaltation of the Holy Cross and Our Lady Health of the Sick in the late 1970s. On 13 December 1981, Bishop of Katowice, Father Herbert Bednorz, consecrated the church, and on 14 September 1991 it was consecrated by Bishop Damian Zimoń.

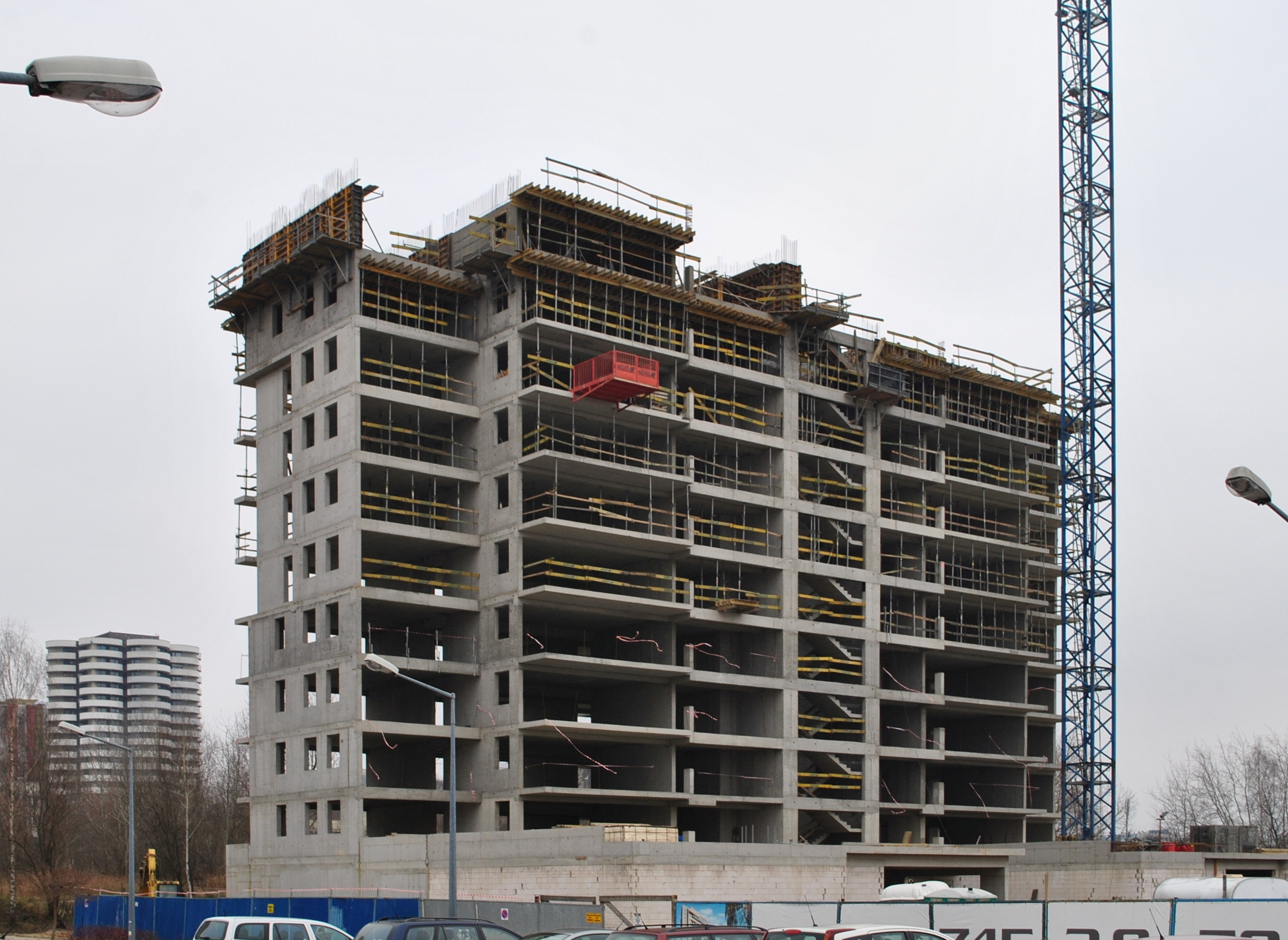
First building of Nowe Tysiąclecie complex under construction in 2014

In 1983, Bishop Herbert Bednorz decided to establish a new parish in the Upper Housing Estate. Construction of the parish church (formally designated as a chapel) began on 13 June 1984. It was erected on 1 September 1985, with Our Lady of Piekary as its patron. The parish church was consecrated on 17 December 1990 by Bishop Damian Zimoń.

Further expansion of the housing estate took place in the 21st century. In 2006, a 14-story residential building was constructed at 12 Piastów Street by the Piast Housing Cooperative, while between 2006 and 2009, the Kraków developer Activ Investment built two 14-story apartment buildings, Parkowa Strona Miasta, along with underground parking garages and retail spaces at 2, 4, and 6 Bolesław Krzywousty Avenue.

In September 2011, construction began on the Cztery Wieże (Four Towers) residential complex along Chorzowska Street. The project was carried out in phases – the first of them (Tower A) was completed in 2013, and the entire complex was finished by 2018. It consists of 348 residential units, as well as retail and service establishments on the ground floor. Construction of the Nowe Tysiąclecie (New Millennium) residential complex on Tysiąclecia Street began in October 2013, consisting of five 11- and 17-story buildings with 573 residential units. This project was fully completed in 2020.

== Demography ==
Before the housing estate was built, the area of the Osiedle Tysiąclecia district consisted mainly of farmland and forest, which is why it was not densely populated. There were also three settlements in this area: Bederowiec, Sośnina (both in the former Gmina Dąb), and Osiedle Pstrowskiego (a settlement of Finnish-style houses in Chorzów). Initial plans envisaged that the area would eventually be home to as many as 45,000 residents on 145 hectares, but later plans called for the construction of a housing estate designed for 20,000 people, with a target of up to 30,000 residents.

In 1988, 27,620 people lived within the boundaries of the Osiedle Tysiąclecia district. At that time, the population was dominated by people aged 30–44 and 45–59. In the subsequent period, the number of inhabitants declined – in 1997, the district had approximately 25,400 residents, and the population density was 13,370 people per km². In 2007, the district was home to 23,501 people, and the population density was 12,480 people per km², meaning that Osiedle Tysiąclecia was the most densely populated district in Katowice (almost seven times the average density for the entire city of Katowice, which in 2007 was 1,916 people per km²). People aged 60 and older and those aged 45–59 predominated, making Osiedle Tysiąclecia one of the districts in Katowice with the highest proportion of people of post-working age.

== Politics and administration ==
On 1 January 1992, 22 Auxiliary Local Government Units were established in Katowice. On the basis of Resolution No. XLVI/449/97 of the Katowice City Council of 29 September 1997, Osiedle Tysiąclecia is a statutory district within the northern district group and constitutes Auxiliary Unit No. 9. The resolution also defined its exact boundaries.

The District Council No. 9 Osiedle Tysiąclecia was granted its charter for the first time on 30 July 2015. The first elections to the council were held on 29 November 2015. The District Council consists of 21 members elected for a four-year term. The executive body of the council is the District Board. The Chair of the then Auxiliary Unit Council for the 2015–2019 term was Zdzisław Czenczek, while the Chair of the Board was Barbara Bańska. In elections to the Katowice City Council, the district belongs to constituency No. 4 (Osiedle Tysiąclecia, Dąb, Załęże, Osiedle Witosa, Załęska Hałda-Brynów). Between 2010 and 2014, this constituency had 6 representatives on the City Council.

== Economy ==
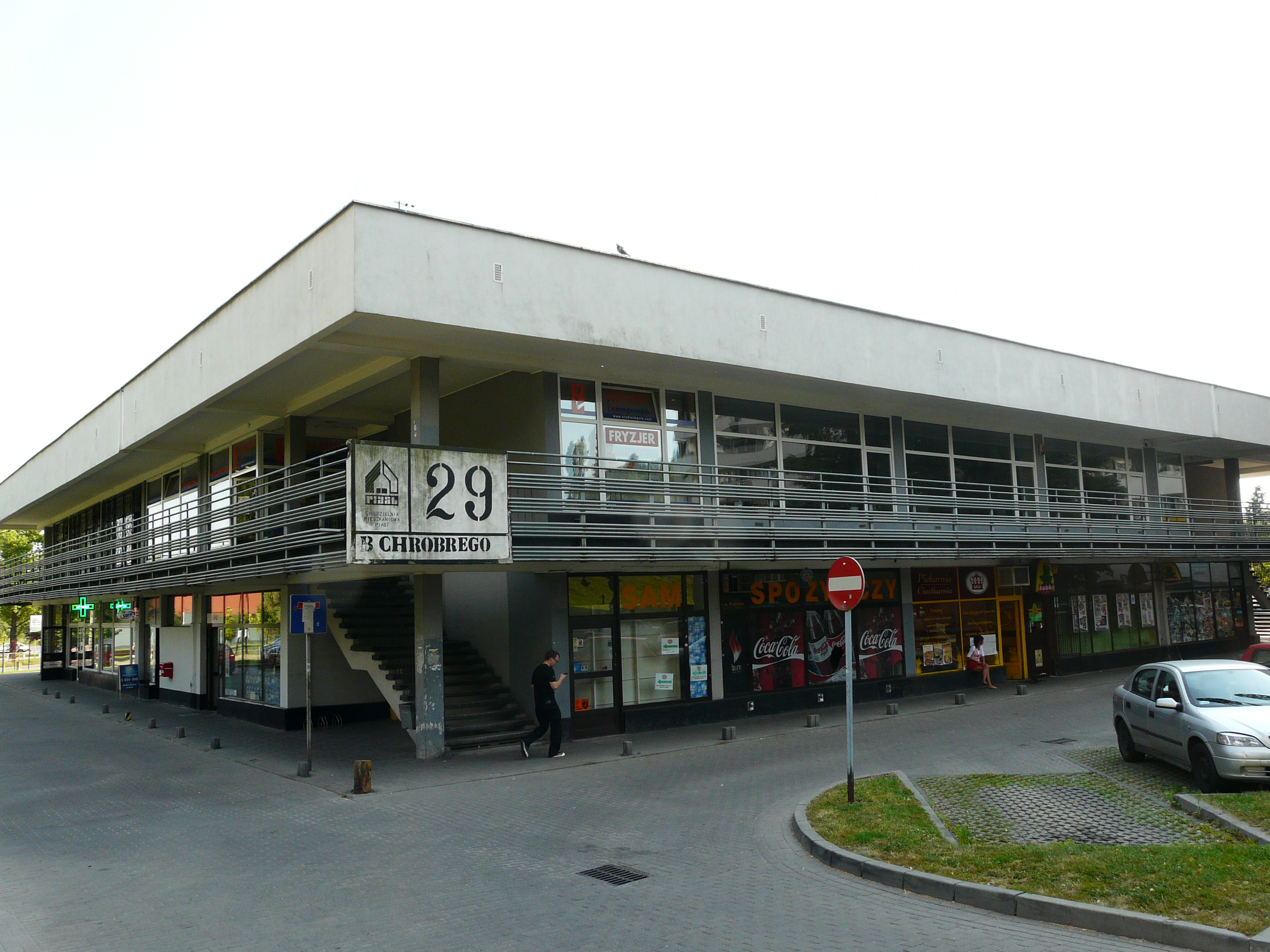
Retail and service pavilion on Bolesław Chrobry Street (2013)

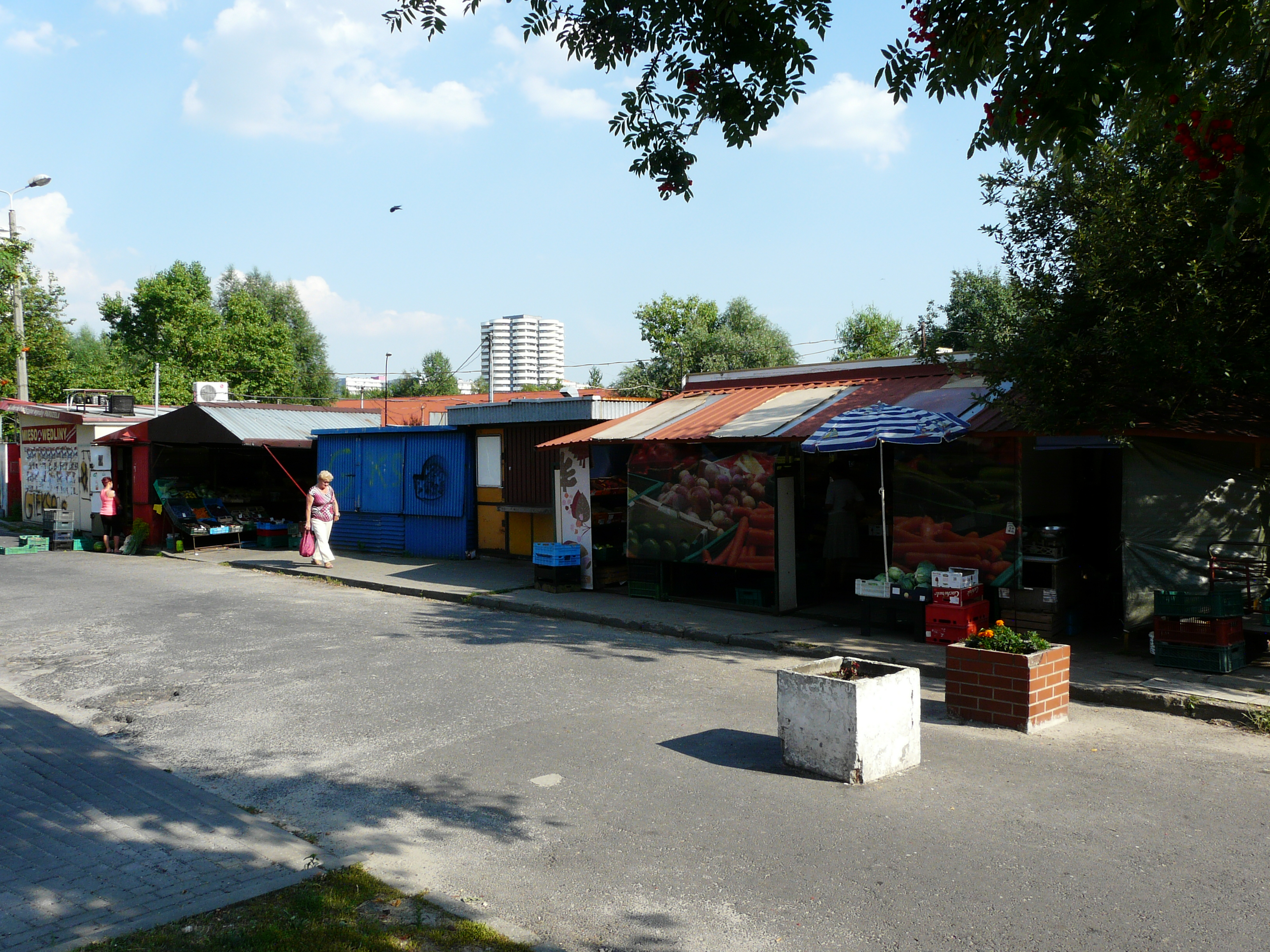
Market on Bolesław Chrobry Street (2013)

Due to its predominantly residential character, commercial activity in Osiedle Tysiąclecia is limited mainly to retail and services aimed at meeting the needs of residents. The decision to build four service centers was made as early as the planning stage. In the 1960s, three retail and service pavilions were built in Lower Tysiąclecie, consisting of ten shops (including a photo lab, a tailor, and a beauty salon), two milk bars, a café, and the Adria restaurant. Between Lower and Upper Tysiąclecie, a Service Center was established, housing, among others, a shoe store, a fish market, a bookstore, and a café. Commercial and service pavilions were also built in Upper Tysiąclecie.

Osiedle Tysiąclecia has three local service centers, the scale of which varies depending on the size of the area they serve. They take the form of a network of scattered facilities loosely integrated with green spaces. These are:

- Lower Housing Estate (area of Krzywousty Avenue, Piastów Avenue, Mieszko I Street, and Tysiąclecia Street) – services: retail, kindergarten, primary school, middle school, cultural center, library, church, green spaces and recreational facilities, and public transport stops;
- Central Housing Estate (Zawisza Czarny Street, Chrobry Street, and Tysiąclecia Street) – services: retail, kindergarten, primary school, middle school, cultural center, library, church, green spaces and recreational facilities, and public transport stops;
- Upper Housing Estate (Ułańska Street and Tysiąclecia Street) – services: retail, church, green spaces and recreational facilities, and public transport stops.

Due to the residential nature of Osiedle Tysiąclecia, there is a large network of stores of various types here, mainly small privately-owned shops and discount stores, while two large shopping centers are located on the outskirts of the district – Auchan Katowice in Załęże and AKS in Chorzów. In 2017, the Tauzen Park shopping arcade opened on Ułańska Street, housing several stores of popular brands, as well as a gym.

The following discount stores and supermarkets are located within the district:

- Aldi (6 Ułańska Street);
- Biedronka (2 stores: 8 Zawisza Czarny Street and 10 Ułańska Street);
- Lidl (3 Bolesław Chrobry Street);
- Stokrotka (16 Zawisza Czarny Street);

== Technical infrastructure ==
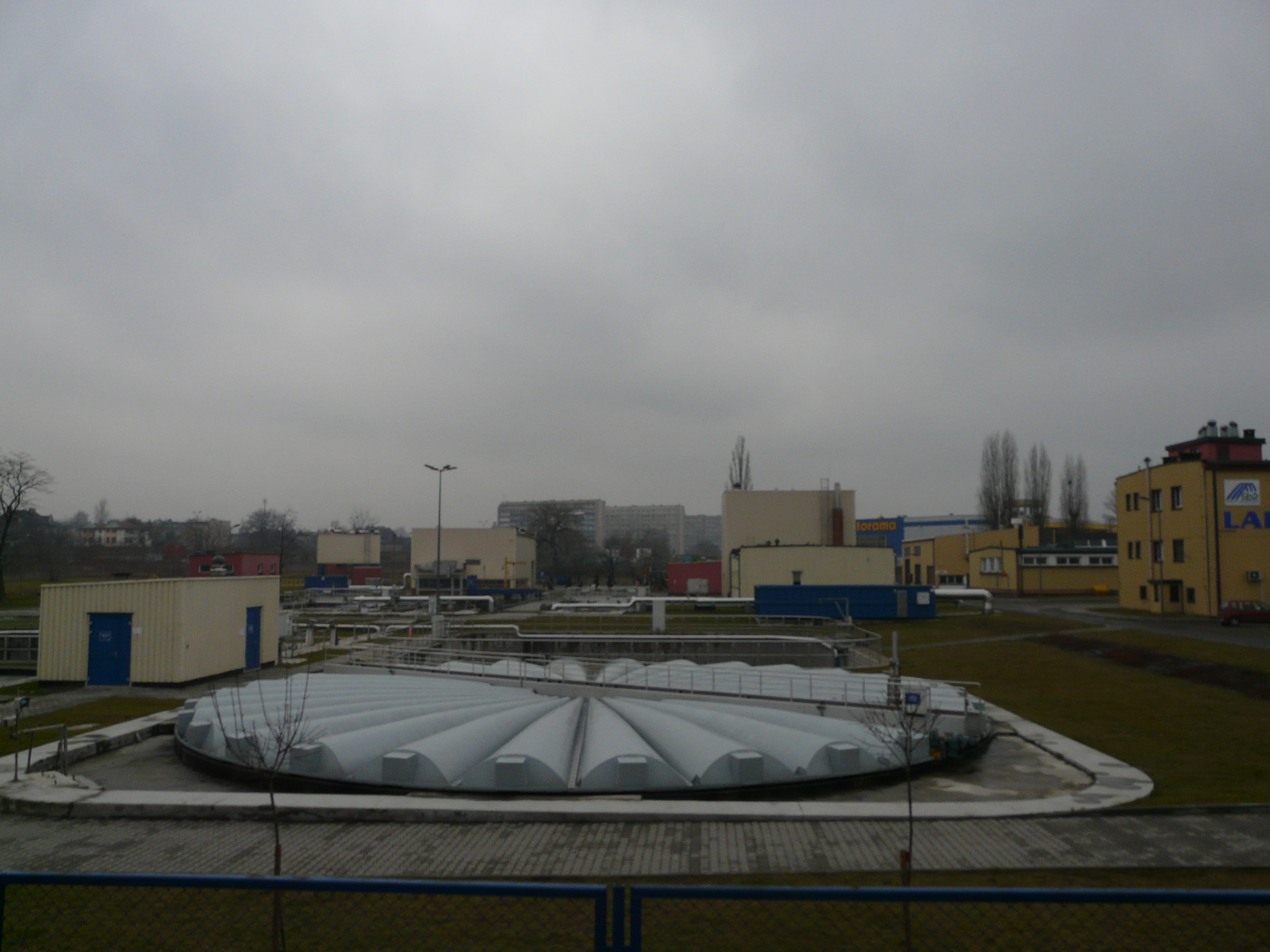
Western part of the Klimzowiec wastewater treatment plant in Chorzów (2014)

The main sources of water for the district's residents are surface water intakes on the Vistula (Goczałkowice Lake) and the Soła (Czanieckie Lake). Water from the Water Treatment Plant is distributed via main and distribution water mains. A 1,400-mm-diameter western transmission pipeline runs near Osiedle Tysiąclecia, connecting the Murcki equalizing reservoir with the Bytków reservoir. Water supply is managed by the Upper Silesian Waterworks Company and Katowice Waterworks.

The sewer system is managed by Katowice Waterworks. Lower Tysiąclecie is located in the catchment area of the Centrum-Gigablok wastewater treatment plant, which receives combined sewer runoff, while Upper Tysiąclecie in the catchment area of the Klimzowiec treatment plant, managed by the Chorzów-Świętochłowice Water and Sewerage Company, the eastern part of which is situated in the southwestern part of the district. The western part of the treatment plant is located in Chorzów (Klimzowiec), where mechanical wastewater treatment takes place, while on the Katowice side, biological waste removal occurs. The treatment plant, whose origins date back to the interwar years, is one of the largest facilities of its kind in Poland, serving approximately 200,000 residents.

Electricity is supplied to residents of Osiedle Tysiąclecia via a 110-kV high-voltage grid connecting them to nearby power plants. The Klimzowiec substation, with a voltage level of 110/6 kV, is located on Tysiąclecia Street. The average electricity consumption per household in Katowice was 865.7 kWh in 2006. Since 2015, resident parking lots in Osiedle Tysiąclecia have been secured using an RFID system, i.e. a connected, maintenance-free system consisting of sensors affixed to residents' car windows and reader systems with antennas linked to automatic barriers.

== Transport ==
=== Road transport ===
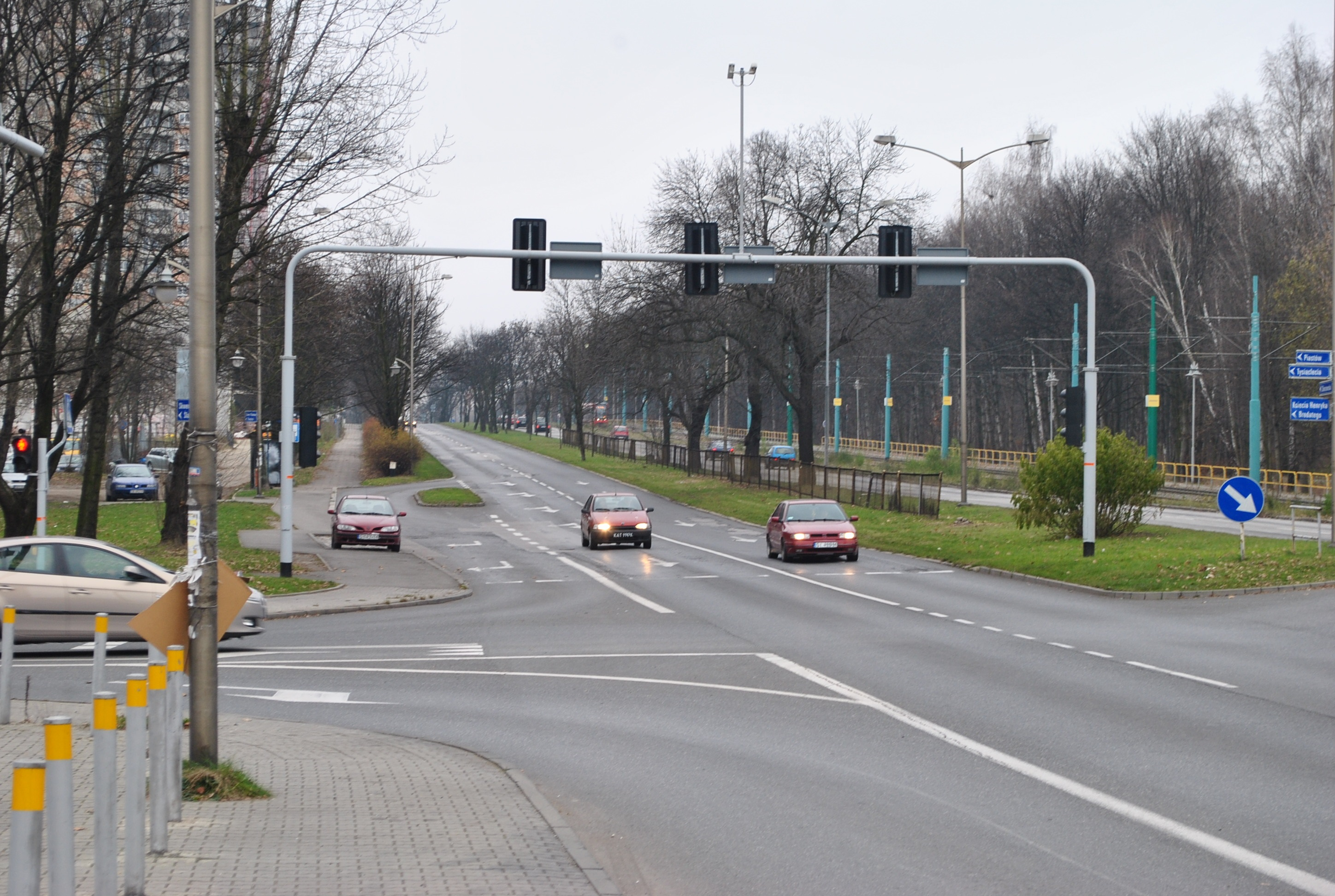
Chorzowska Street near Henryk Sławik Roundabout (2014)

The road network within Osiedle Tysiąclecia consists of streets that serve as bypasses for Lower and Upper Tysiąclecie, with roundabouts between them; within these networks, pedestrian and bicycle paths predominate. In the Lower Tysiąclecie, the main thoroughfares include Piastów and Tysiąclecia streets. The latter connects both parts of the district, running from the Henryk Sławik Roundabout on Chorzowska Street near the Giraffe Sculpture to Chorzów, where it joins Wojska Polskiego Avenue. In Upper Tysiąclecie, other main thoroughfares are Bolesław Chrobry and Ułańska streets. The main pedestrian and bicycle route is Bolesław Krzywousty Avenue, while in Upper Tysiąclecie, Jadwiga of Silesia Avenue and Henryk Pobożny Avenue.

Osiedle Tysiąclecia is very well connected to the rest of the region. It is surrounded by two major thoroughfares important to Metropolis GZM: Drogowa Trasa Średnicowa (Nikodem and Józef Reniec Avenue; near the southern district boundary) and national road 79 (Chorzowska Street; northern district boundary). These roads connect with Bracka and Feliks Bocheński streets and further south with the A4 motorway at a major interchange.

In terms of intra-city connections, Osiedle Tysiąclecia has very good connections to Śródmieście (along Chorzowska Street and Nikodem and Józef Reniec Avenue), as well as to neighbouring districts, and along major roads to, among others, Bogucice, Koszutka, Giszowiec, and Szopienice-Burowiec.

=== Urban public transport ===
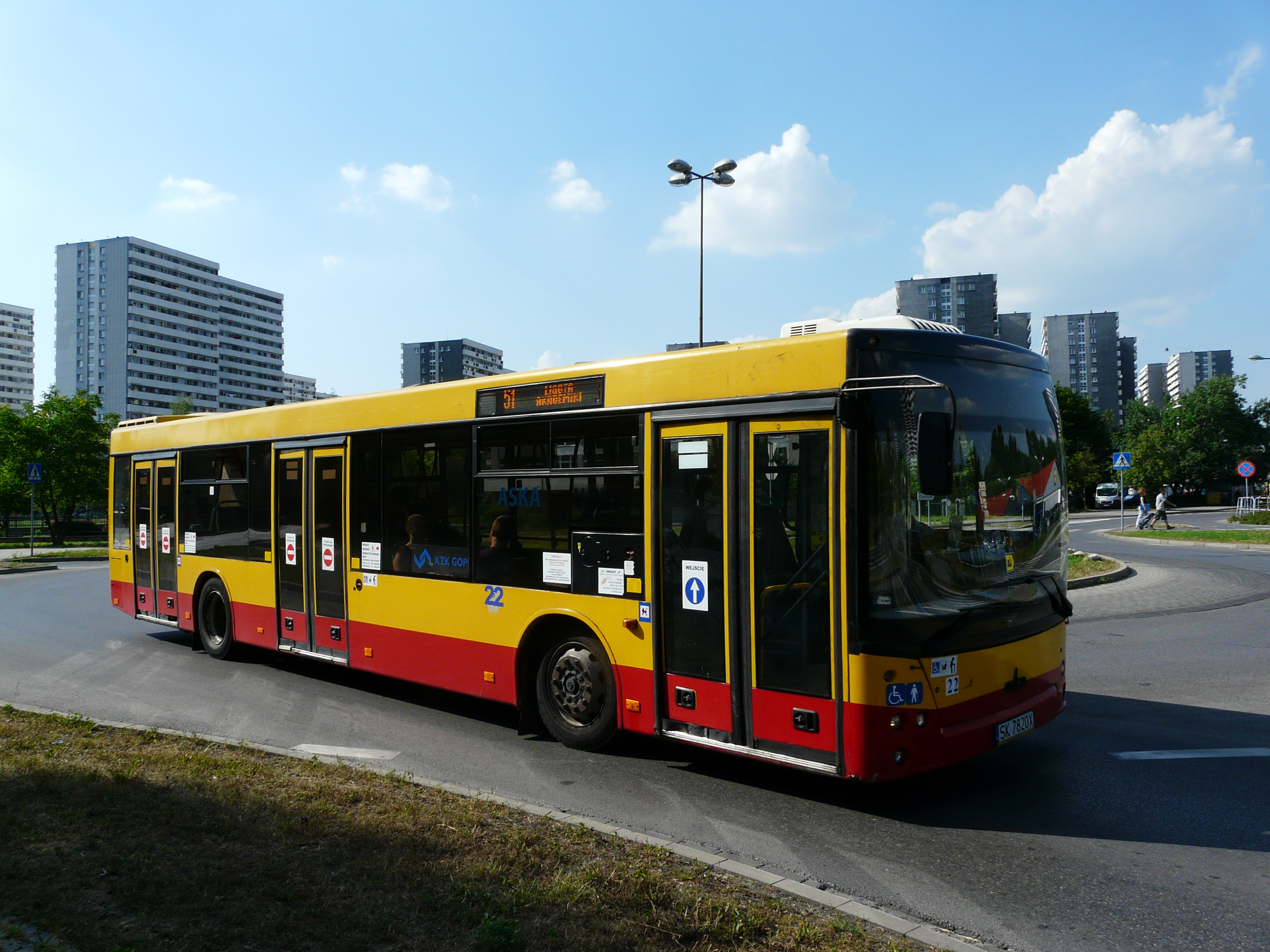
Bus of line 51 at Sybiraków Roundabout (2013)

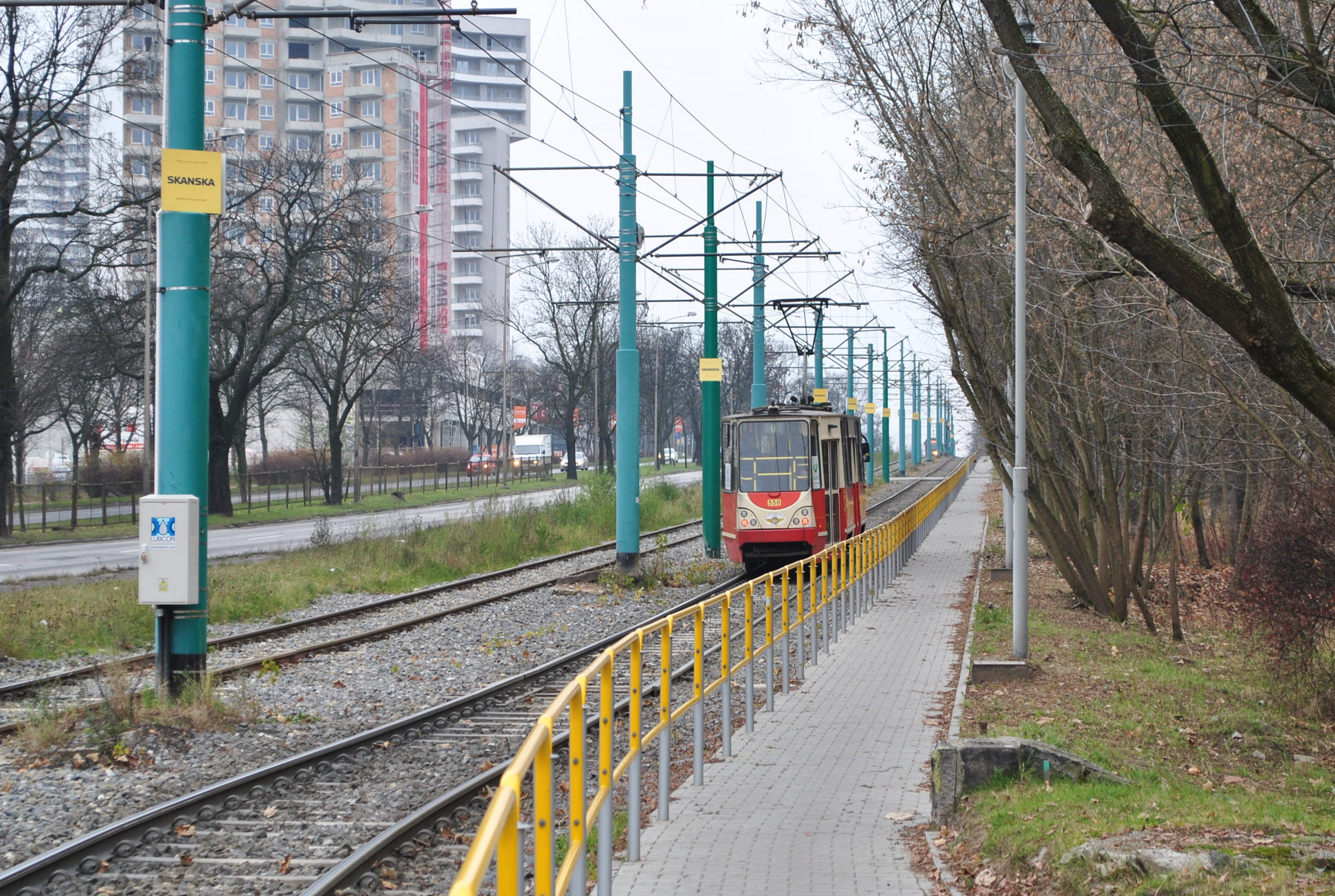
Konstal 105Na on the tram line along Chorzowska Street (2014)

Public transportation in the district consists of trams and buses. There is no rail service. Tram and bus routes are operated on behalf of the Metropolitan Transport Authority. There are 16 stops within Osiedle Tysiąclecia, of which 4 are tram stops and 10 are bus stops (including the stop at the terminus in Upper Tysiąclecie). Bus routes run along the main streets of the district, while the tram line runs parallel to Chorzowska Street on a separate track.

The main public transportation routes in the district are (as of 2014):

- Chorzowska Street (Lower and Upper Tysiąclecie) – 5 bus lines (6, 830, 840, 840N, M3) and 6 tram lines (0, 6, 11, 19, and 23). This route is mostly interurban, with main destinations including Śródmieście, Chorzów, Bytom, Tarnowskie Góry, and Gliwice, while bus lines serve only Lower Tysiąclecie;
- Tysiąclecia Street between Piastów and Mieszko I streets (Lower Tysiąclecie) – 9 bus lines (7, 7N, 23, 51, 109, 138, 673, 674, M24), mainly intra-city;
- Piastów Street (Lower Tysiąclecie) – 2 bus lines (51 and 138);
- Mieszko I Street (Lower Tysiąclecie) – 4 bus lines (7, 7N, 109, M24);
- Tysiąclecia Street between Mieszko I and Ułańska streets, returning via Ułańska and Bolesław Chrobry streets (Upper Tysiąclecie) – 5 lines (23, 51, 138, 673, and 674), mainly intra-city.

In addition to lines 51, 138, 673, and 674, bus line 165, which mainly serves Chorzów, also begins and ends its route at the Tysiąclecie bus terminal.

==== Trams ====
The origins of the tram network in the district date back to the late 19th century, long before the housing estate was built. At that time, the Berlin-based company Kramer & Co. applied for a concession to build a narrow-gauge steam tram line on the Królewska Huta–Dąb–Katowice–Wełnowiec–Huta Laura route, which it obtained on 23 March 1896. In the same year, the section from Katowice (near the present-day Jerzy Ziętek Square) to Wełnowiec and Huta Laura was built, while two years later construction began on the tram line from Katowice (Market Square) to Dąb and Królewska Huta, which was completed in August and launched on 25 November 1898. The route running along the northern edge of present-day Osiedle Tysiąclecia was narrow-gauge from the beginning, with a single track on the north side of the roadway. The standard-gauge section between the Market Square, Dąb, and Królewska Huta Hitler Square (Market Square) was put into service on 24 December 1940. The current layout of the tram route from Katowice to Chorzów was finally established in 1962, in connection with the construction of the Voivodeship Park of Culture and Recreation and the Silesian Stadium (two terminals were built at the stadium at that time – an eastern and a western one, connected by a third track). Further modernization work on the tram network along Chorzowska Street (replacement of tracks, platforms, and overhead lines between Legendia and Silesian Stadium) was carried out between 2013 and 2015, mainly as part of a project co-financed by the European Union.

== Architecture ==
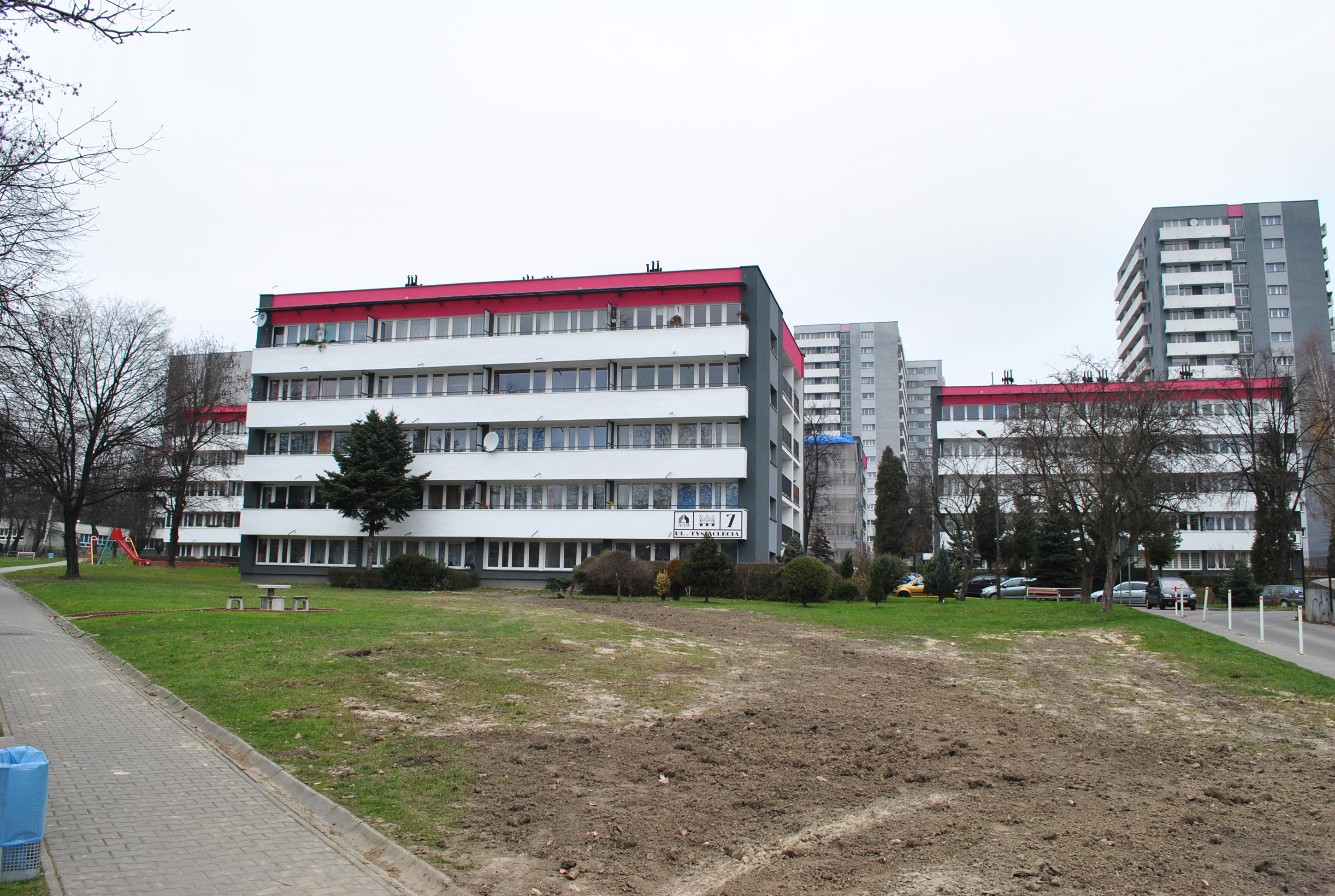
Low-rise buildings on Bolesław Krzywousty Avenue in Lower Tysiąclecie (2014)

Osiedle Tysiąclecia consists of high-rise (14-, 19-, and 24-story) multifamily residentials measuring several dozen meters in height, as well as lower-rise buildings constructed during the first phase of the estate's development (in the so-called Lower Tysiąclecie; 5-story buildings). In 2010, the tallest buildings were the Kukurydze – each 87 meters tall (25 stories) – which at the time were also the tallest residential buildings in Poland built outside of Warsaw. There are no historical or landmark buildings in the district.

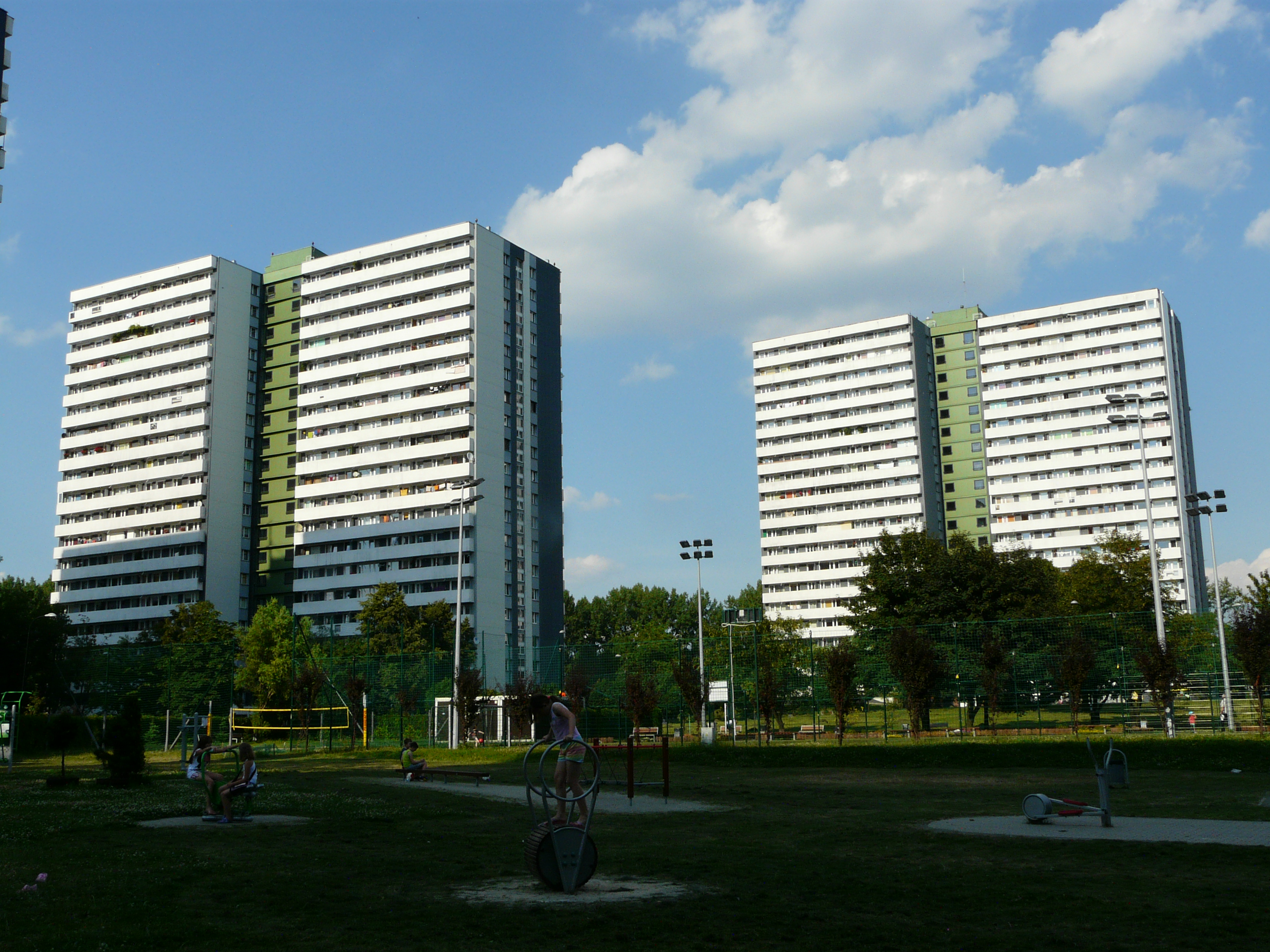
High-rise buildings on Ułańska Street in Upper Tysiąclecie (2013)

Osiedle Tysiąclecia, built between 1961 and 1982 and later expanded, was designed by four architects: Henryk Buszko, Aleksander Franta, Marian Dziewoński, and Tadeusz Szewczyk. In 2006, the housing estate comprised 43 residential buildings managed by the Piast Housing Cooperative and 3 buildings managed by the Wspólna Praca Housing Cooperative, while the remainder were managed by residents' associations. The entire housing estate consists of two main groups – the Lower and Upper Housing Estates – between which newer developments were later built: Kukurydze, Piastów 12, Parkowa Strona Miasta, and the later Cztery Wieże and Nowe Tysiąclecie. The proportion of built-up area to the total area of the housing estate is 18%, the floor area ratio (net) is 0.87, and the weighted average number of stories is 4.83.

From an urban planning perspective, the district is characterized by an internal transportation network consisting of bypasses for the Lower and Upper Housing Estates, with roundabouts between them. Due to the topography and terrain, the layout of the multifamily residentials is varied and adapted to the specific characteristics of the area – the buildings on Mieszko I Street are arranged in a comb-like pattern, while those on Tysiąclecia Street are arranged in a cluster layout. They are spaced far apart (no less than 50 meters), and the interior of the housing estate has an open, park-like arrangement.

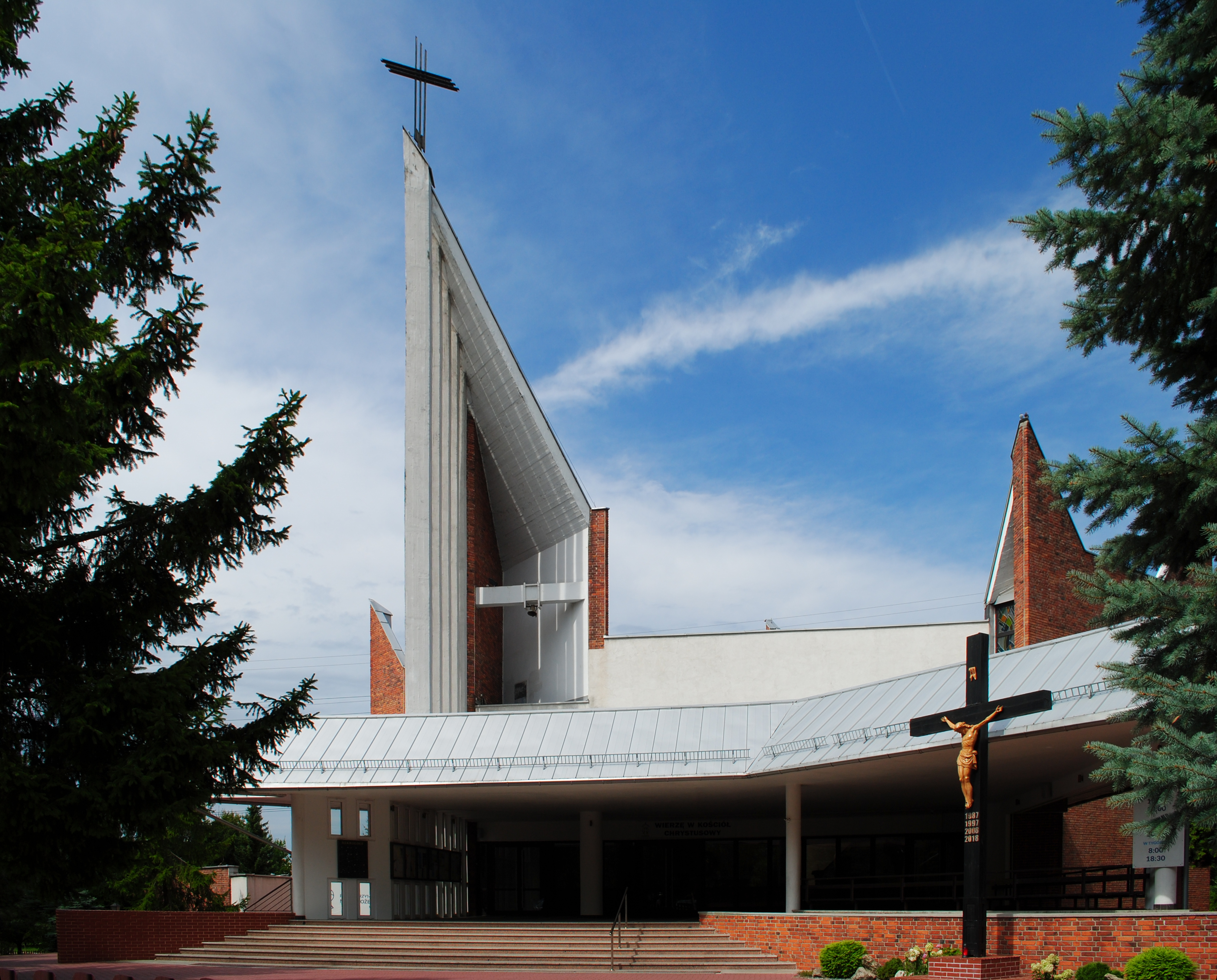
Church of Our Lady of Piekary in Upper Tysiąclecie (2023)

The new development in Osiedle Tysiąclecia has drawn criticism for disrupting the existing architectural and urban layout of the district. For this reason, one of the estate's architects, Aleksander Franta, filed a lawsuit in 2007 against Gmina Katowice for copyright infringement in connection with the issuance of building permits for the new structures. According to the author, the housing estate constitutes an architectural and urban planning work within the meaning of copyright law; therefore, the rule of protecting the integrity of the work prohibits property owners from making changes to it without the creator's consent. The City Council, however, took the position that the law does not impose an obligation to verify whether a construction project infringes on copyright.

In order to restore order to the layout of the estate, which had been disrupted by new construction, the Katowice City Council adopted a zoning plan covering Osiedle Tysiąclecia and the northern part of Załęże on 22 June 2011. This plan was intended to protect municipal land and the housing cooperative from new residential developments within the estate.

List of buildings (min. 12 storeys)
No.	Location	Floors	Management / Developer
1	Katowice, 2 Bolesław Krzywousty Avenue	12	WMN Parkowa Strona Miasta / Activ Investment
2	Katowice, 4–6 Bolesław Krzywousty Avenue	12	WMN Parkowa Strona Miasta / Activ Investment
3	Katowice, 216 Chorzowska Street	17+3	WMN 4 Wieże Segment A / Activ Investment
4	Katowice, 214 Chorzowska Street	17+3	WMN 4 Wieże Segment B / Activ Investment
5	Katowice, 212 Chorzowska Street	17+3	WMN 4 Wieże Segment C / Activ Investment
6	Katowice, Chorzowska Street (under construction)	17+3	Activ Investment
7	Katowice, 2 Chrobry Street	19+1	SM Piast
8	Katowice, 9 Chrobry Street	14+1	SM Piast
9	Katowice, 13 Chrobry Street	14+1	SM Piast
10	Katowice, 17 Chrobry Street	14+1	SM Wspólna Praca
11	Katowice, 25 Chrobry Street	14+1	Residents' Association
12	Katowice, 26 Chrobry Street	14+1	SM Wspólna Praca
13	Katowice, 31 Chrobry Street	14+1	SM Piast
14	Katowice, 32 Chrobry Street	14+1	SM Piast
15	Katowice, 37 Chrobry Street	14+1	SM Piast
16	Katowice, 38 Chrobry Street	14+1	SM Piast
17	Katowice, 43 Chrobry Street	14+1	SM Piast
18	Katowice, 5 Mieszko I Street	14+1	Residents' Association
19	Katowice, 15 Mieszko I Street	14+1	Residents' Association
20	Katowice, 3 Piastów Street	14+1	SM Piast
21	Katowice, 5 Piastów Street	14+1	SM Piast
22	Katowice, 7 Piastów Street	14+1	Residents' Association
23	Katowice, 9 Piastów Street	19+1	SM Piast
24	Katowice, 11 Piastów Street	14+1	Residents' Association
25	Katowice, 10 Piastów Street	14+1	SM Piast
26	Katowice, 12 Piastów Street	11+1	SM Piast
27	Katowice, 16 Piastów Street	14+1	SM Piast
28	Katowice, 18 Piastów Street	14+1	SM Piast
29	Katowice, 22 Piastów Street	14+1	SM Piast
30	Katowice, 24 Piastów Street	14+1	SM Piast
31	Katowice, 26 Piastów Street	14+1	SM Piast
32	Katowice, 1 Tysiąclecia Street	16+1	SM Piast
33	Katowice, 4 Tysiąclecia Street	14+1	Residents' Association
34	Katowice, 6 Tysiąclecia Street	14+1	SM Piast
35	Katowice, 15 Tysiąclecia Street	14+1	SM Piast
36	Katowice, 19 Tysiąclecia Street	14+1	SM Piast
37	Katowice, 21 Tysiąclecia Street	14+1	SM Piast
38	Katowice, 29 Tysiąclecia Street	11+1	Residents' Association
39	Katowice, 41 Tysiąclecia Street	11+1	Residents' Association
40	Katowice, 47 Tysiąclecia Street	14+1	SM Piast
41	Katowice, 78 Tysiąclecia Street	19+1	SM Piast
42	Katowice, 80 Tysiąclecia Street	14+1	Residents' Association
43	Katowice, 84 Tysiąclecia Street	14+1	Residents' Association
44	Katowice, 86 Tysiąclecia Street	14+1	Residents' Association
45	Katowice, 86a Tysiąclecia Street	14+1	SM Wspólna Praca
46	Katowice, 86b Tysiąclecia Street	14+1	Residents' Association
47	Katowice, 88 Tysiąclecia Street	19+1	SM Piast
48	Katowice, 90 Tysiąclecia Street	19+1	SM Piast
49	Katowice, 92 Tysiąclecia Street	19+1	SM Piast
50	Katowice, 24 Tysiąclecia Street	17	Nowe Tysiąclecie / J.W. Construction
51	Katowice, 22 Tysiąclecia Street	17	Nowe Tysiąclecie / J.W. Construction
52	Katowice, 5 Ułańska Street	19+1	SM Piast
53	Katowice, 7 Ułańska Street	19+1	SM Piast
54	Katowice, 9 Ułańska Street	19+1	SM Piast
55	Katowice, 11 Ułańska Street	19+1	SM Piast
56	Katowice, 16 Ułańska Street	19+1	SM Piast
57	Katowice, 4 Zawisza Czarny Street	27	SM Piast
58	Katowice, 6 Zawisza Czarny Street	27	SM Piast
59	Katowice, 10 Zawisza Czarny Street	27	SM Piast

=== Monuments and commemorative plaques ===
The following memorial sites are located within Osiedle Tysiąclecia:

- Plaque dedicated to Bishop Herbert Bednorz (in the Church of Our Lady of Piekary at 13 Ułańska Street);
- Memorial site containing soil from battlefields and places of martyrdom of the Polish nation (in the R. Mielczarski Vocational Schools Complex at 13 Bolesław Krzywousty Avenue);
- Plaque commemorating Romuald Mielczarski – a cooperative movement activist (in the R. Mielczarski Vocational Schools Complex at 13 Bolesław Krzywousty Avenue);
- Plaque commemorating Captain Robert Oszek – an officer of the Polish Navy and commander of the Third Silesian Uprising (Robert Oszek Square).

== Culture ==
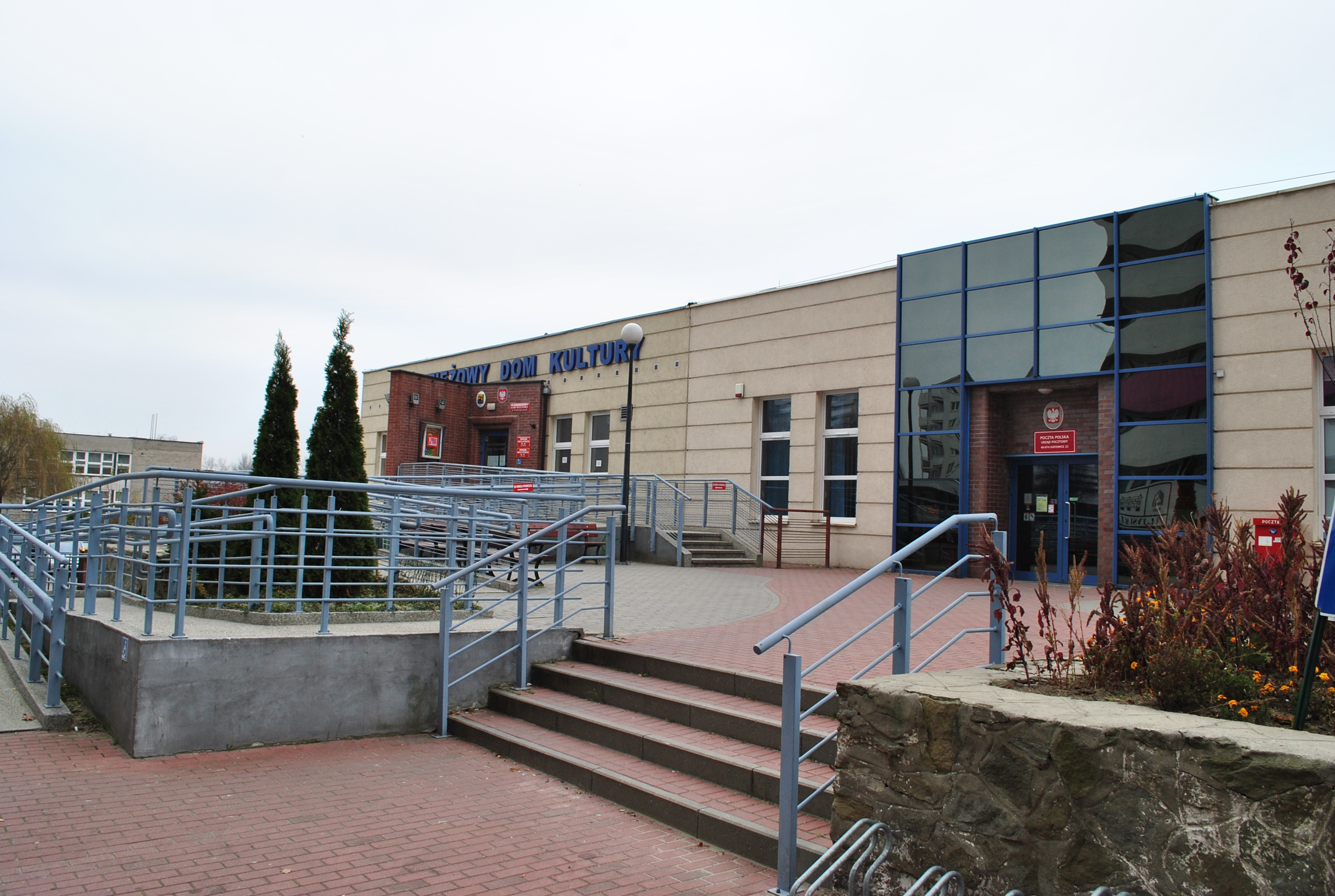
Youth Cultural Center in Lower Tysiąclecie (2014)

The first cultural facilities in Osiedle Tysiąclecia were built alongside the southern part of the housing estate. At that time, community centers, neighborhood clubs, and branches of the Municipal Public Library were established within the residential buildings. The original design also called for the construction of a central cultural center with a movie theater and a library, and between 1982 and 1985, plans included a large cultural and educational center, a post office with a telephone exchange, and a large supermarket covering an area of 15,000 m².

Osiedle Tysiąclecia is home to the Cooperative Cultural Center, which is administered by the Piast Housing Cooperative. It is located at 8 Zawisza Czarny Street. It runs 16 sections (including language courses and classes for children and seniors), and also hosts other activities in the fields of culture, sports, and recreation. Since 12 June 2007, a branch of the Youth Cultural Center has been operating in Lower Tysiąclecie at 5 Tysiąclecia Street. The facility offers classes for children and youth, mainly focused on music and dance. The Tysiąclatki Song and Dance Ensemble, which has been active in the district since 1973, is based there. The ensemble offers classes in Polish and foreign folklore as well as other forms of dance.

Two branches of the Katowice Municipal Public Library are located in the district. In Lower Tysiąclecie, at 20 Piastów Street, Branch No. 14 is located. This library has a lending section for children and adults, as well as a computer station with multimedia programmes. The library publishes its own gazette – BiblioZetka-Strefa 14. The library's total collection amounts to approximately 46,900 volumes. The second branch (No. 25) is located in Upper Tysiąclecie at 2 Bolesław Chrobry Street. It also has a lending section for children and adults and computers with multimedia programmes. This library also publishes its own gazette – FLESZ 25. The total collection of this library is 35,480 volumes.

The main plot of the 2006 film Czeka na nas świat (The World Awaits Us) is set on the estate, as is Wojciech Grabowski's novel Maroko, czyli rzecz o dorastaniu na Górnym Śląsku (Morocco, or a Story About Growing Up in Upper Silesia).

== Education ==
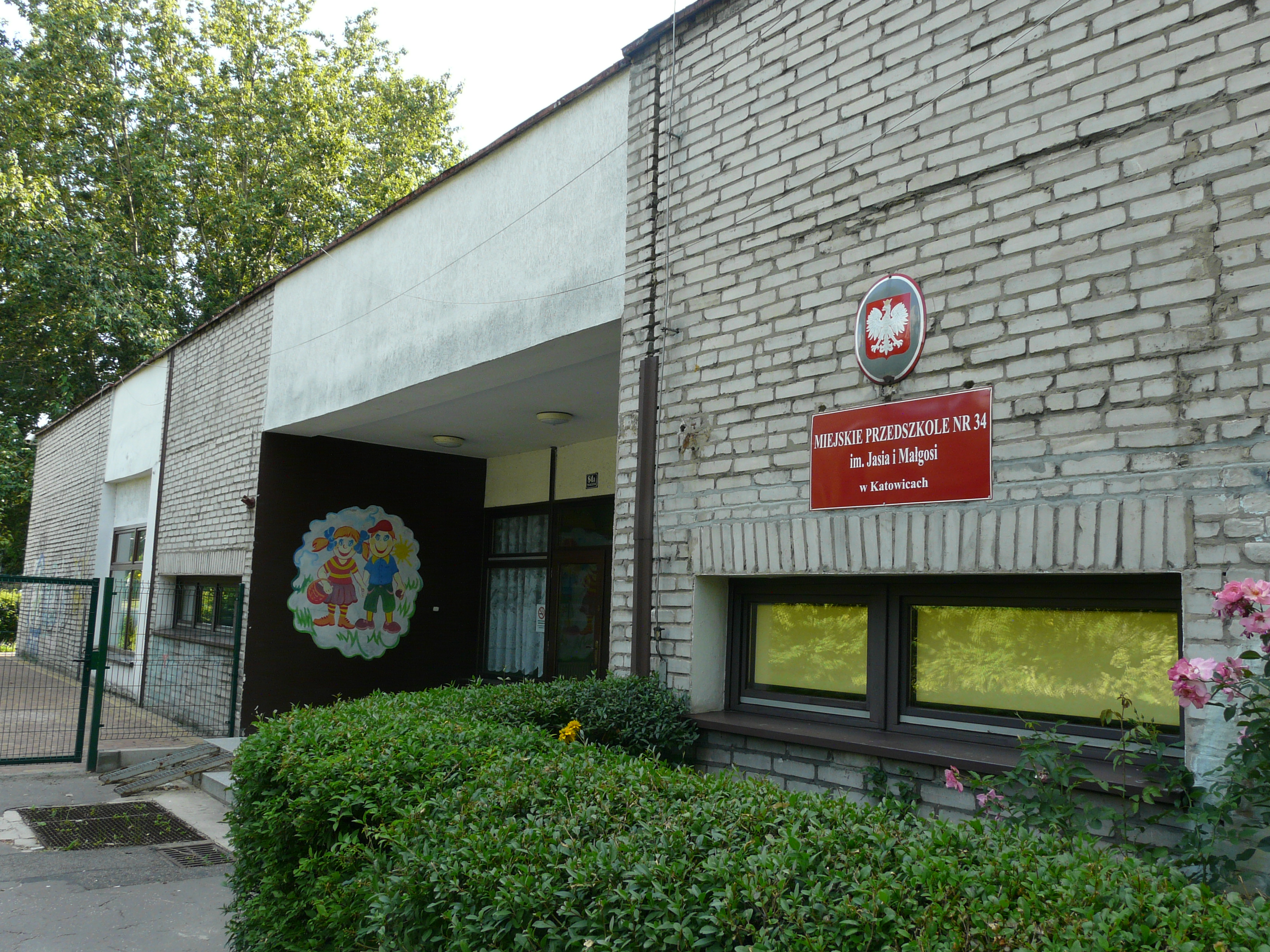
Jaś and Małgosia Municipal Kindergarten No. 34 (2013)

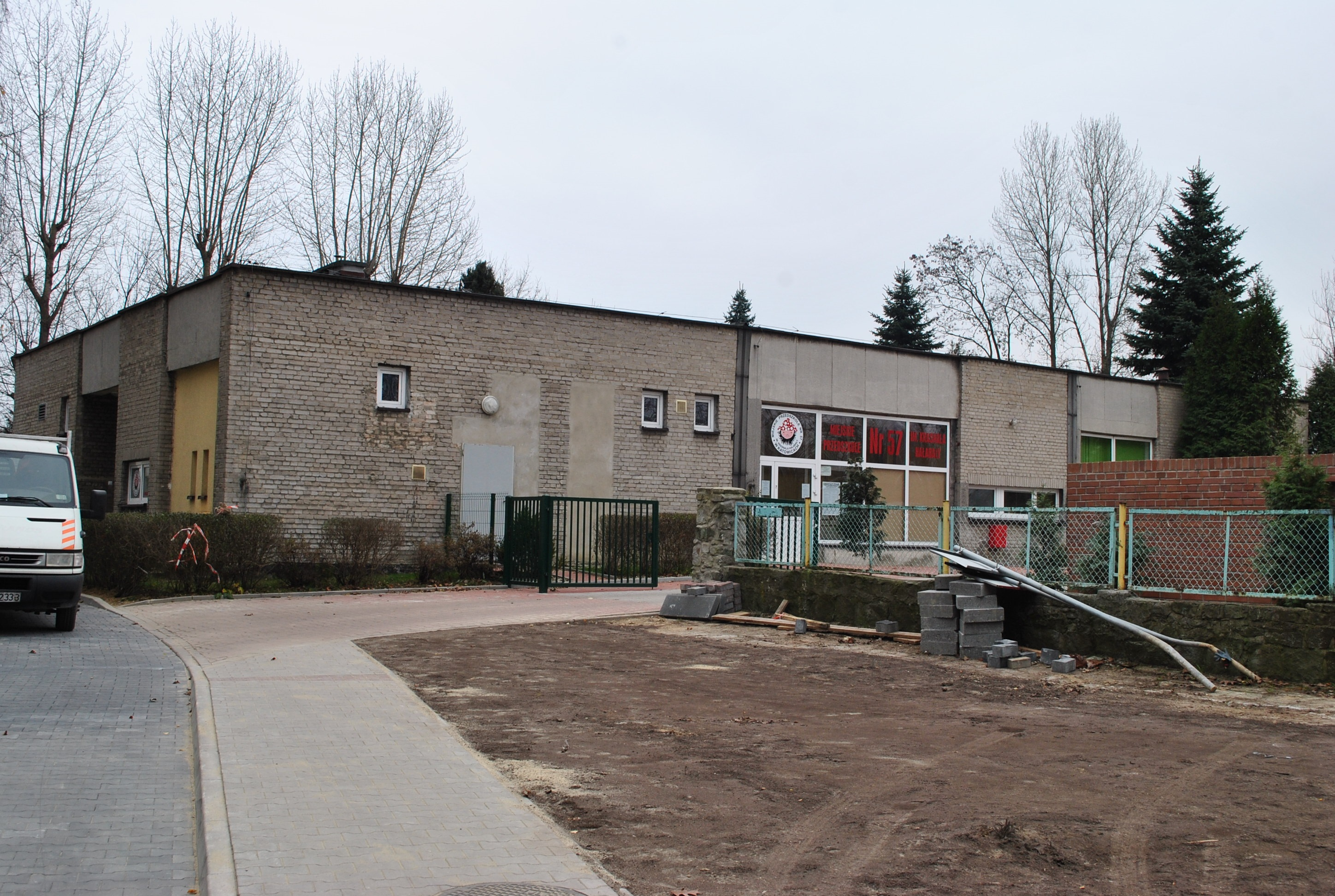
Krasnal Hałabała Municipal Kindergarten No. 57 (2014)

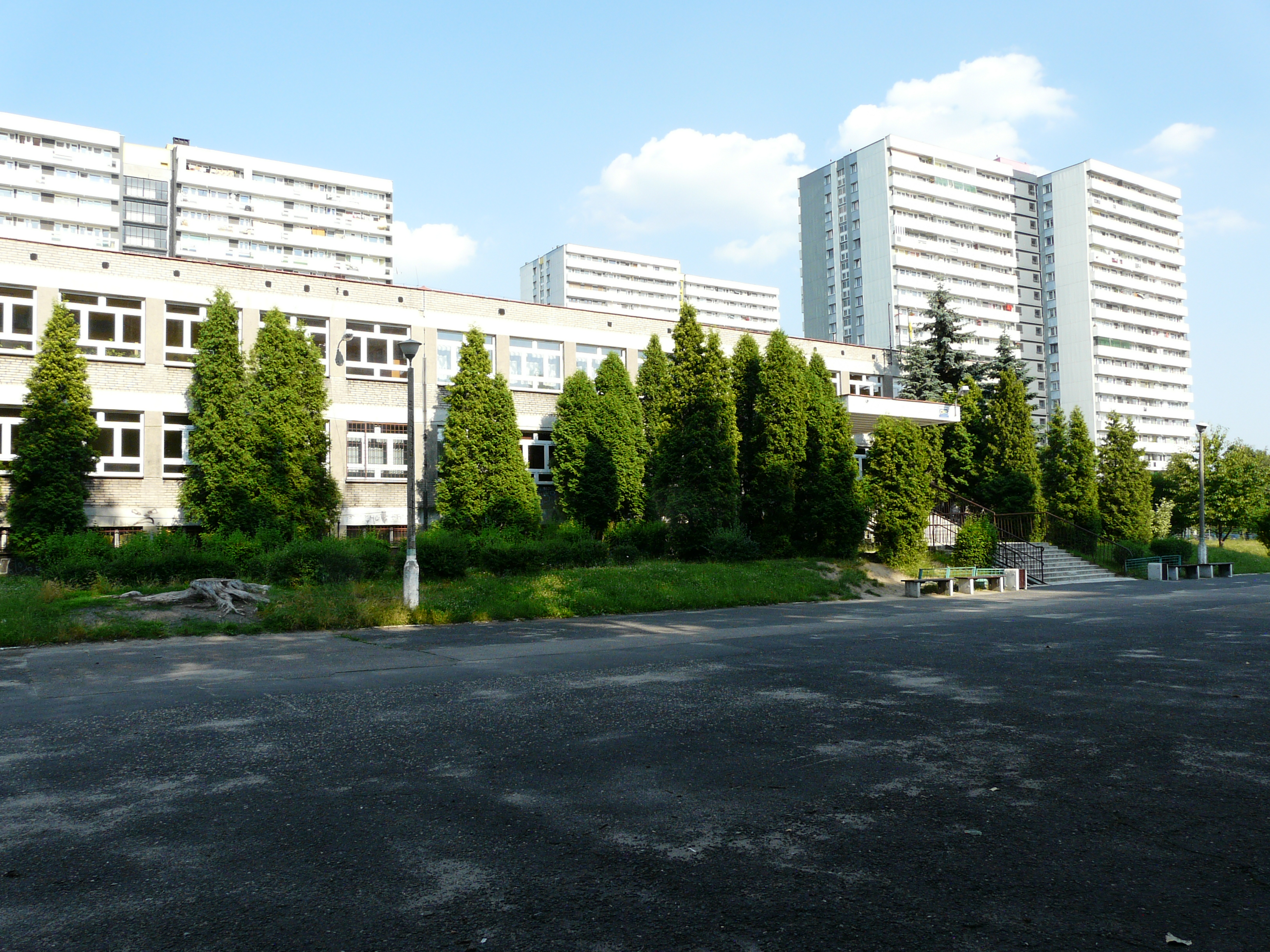
Jan Matejko Primary School No. 59 (2013)

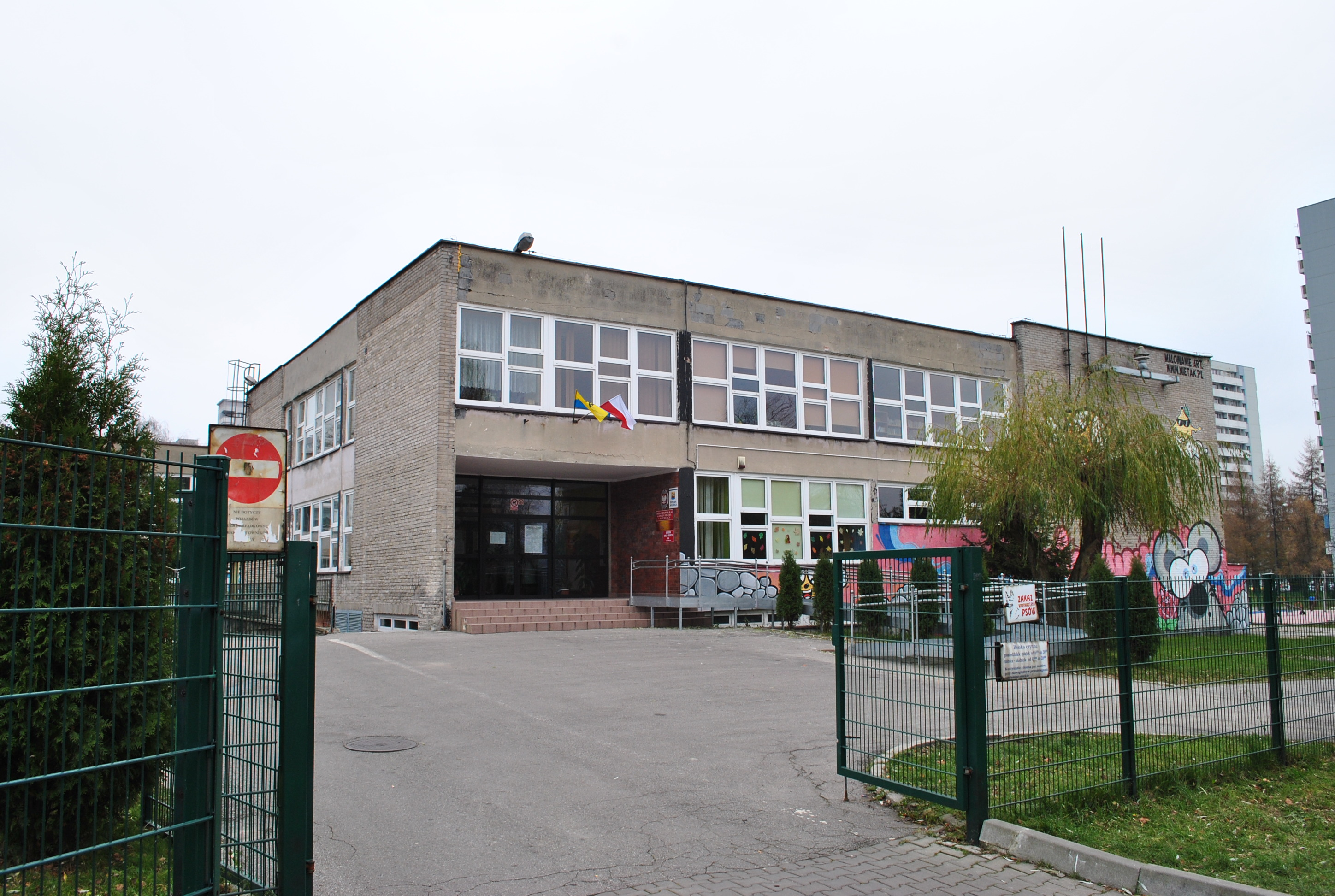
Janusz Korczak Primary School No. 66 (2014)

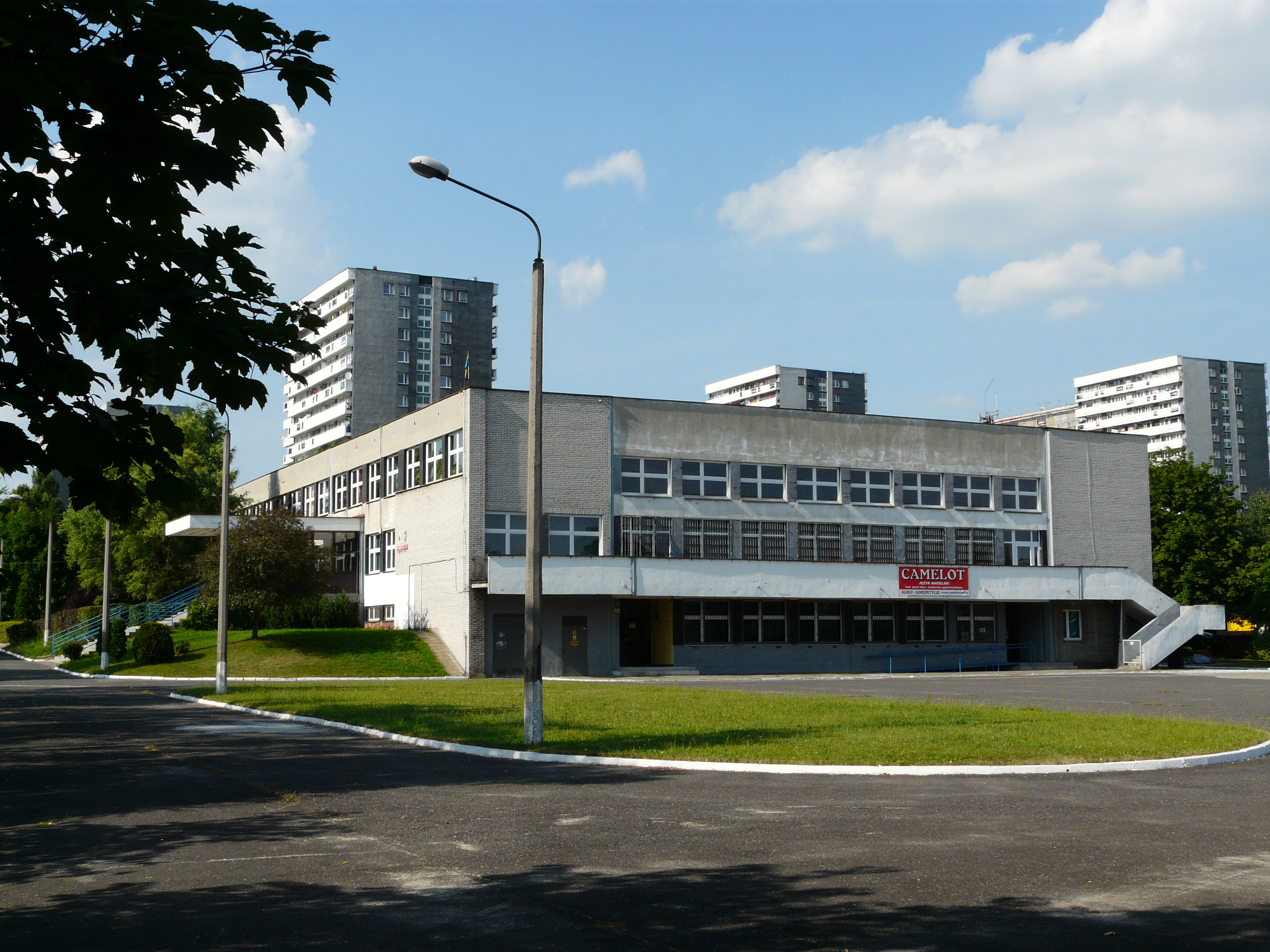
General Education Schools Complex No. 3 (2013)

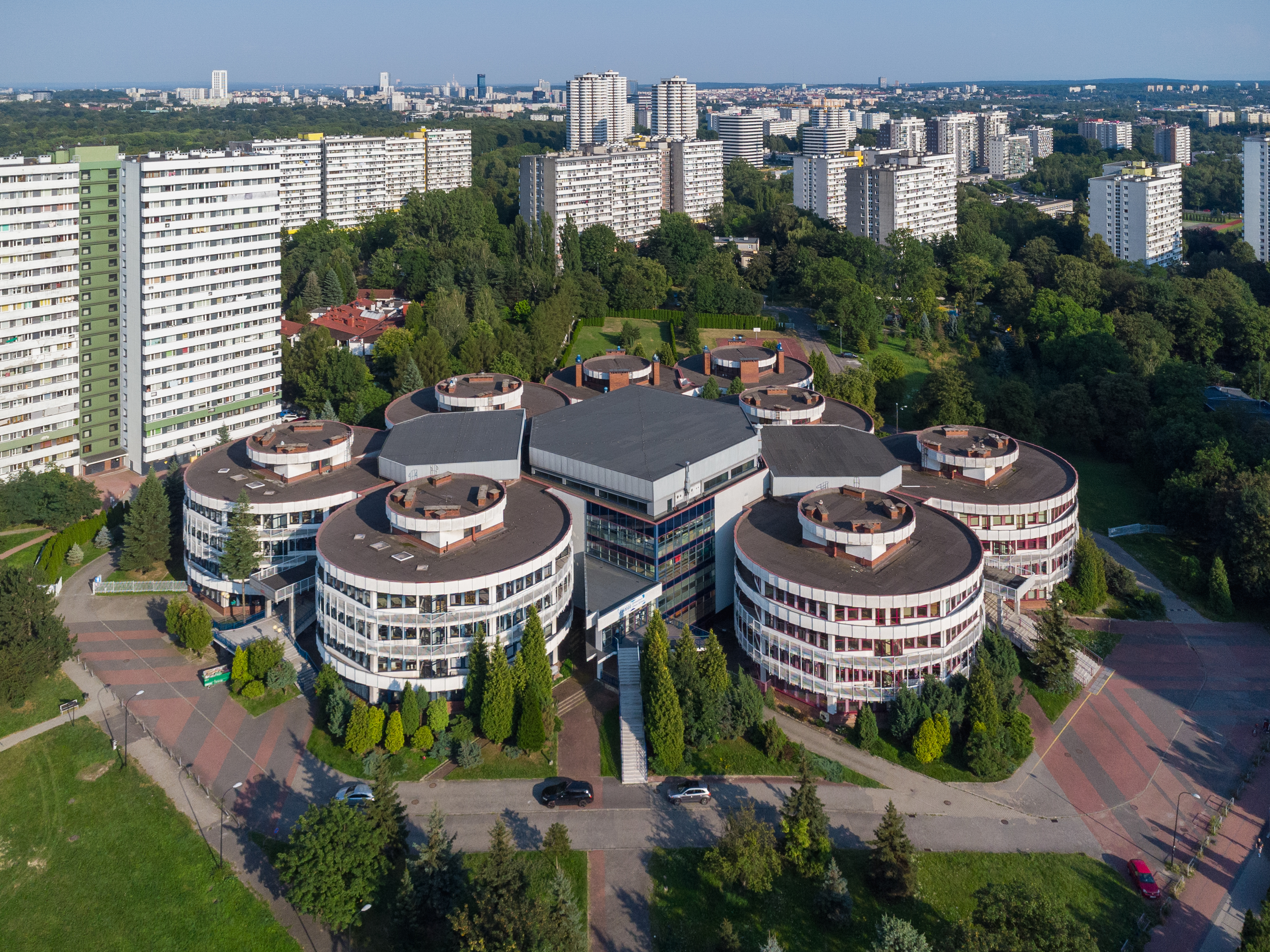
Arts Schools Complex and the Karol Szymanowski State General Music School of the Second Level (2026)

According to the original plan, Osiedle Tysiąclecia's educational needs were to be met within three school districts. At that time, plans called for the construction of five elementary schools, each with 24 classrooms, eight kindergartens, and five daycare centers. Along with the construction of the Lower Housing Estate, a daycare center for 80 children, four kindergartens for 120 children each, two elementary schools for 960 children each, and a student dormitory with 224 apartments were opened. The educational needs and offerings in the district have changed over time. As of December 2014, the following educational institutions were located within the boundaries of Osiedle Tysiąclecia:

- Nurseries:
  1. Branch of the Municipal Nursery (45 Tysiąclecia Street);
  2. Epionkowo Nursery (7a Zawisza Czarny Street),
- Kindergartens:
  1. Wesoła Ludwiczka Municipal Kindergarten No. 21 (27 Tysiąclecia Street);
  2. King Maciuś I Municipal Kindergarten No. 25 (13 Mieszko I Street);
  3. Jaś and Małgosia Municipal Kindergarten No. 34 (84a Tysiąclecia Street);
  4. Krasnal Hałabała Municipal Kindergarten No. 57 (13 Piastów Street);
  5. Wróbelek Elemelek Municipal Kindergarten No. 90 (39 Bolesław Chrobry Street);
  6. Madzik Place Kindergarten (8 Zawisza Czarny Street);
  7. Papa Smurf Private Kindergarten (6 Bolesław Krzywousty Avenue);
  8. Epionkowo Kindergarten (7a Zawisza Czarny Street);
- Primary schools:
  1. Jan Matejko Primary School No. 59 (5 Bolesław Chrobry Street) – a public primary school in Upper Tysiąclecie, whose construction began in 1974 and which opened on 1 September 1977. Formally, the school was relocated from Koszutka, which is why it has a lower number than the two older schools that previously operated in the estate. In its first year of operation at the new location, it was attended by 866 students in 28 classes. Due to the estate's ever-growing educational needs, part of the building on Ułańska Street was converted for school use. In 1986, the now-defunct Primary School No. 63 was moved from 9 Bolesław Krzywousty Avenue to its new location at 4 Bolesław Chrobry Street, which led to a gradual reduction in overcrowding. In the 2008/2009 school year, it had 380 students in 18 classes, and 36 teachers worked there;
  2. Janusz Korczak Primary School No. 66 (7 Bolesław Krzywousty Avenue) – a public primary school operating in Lower Tysiąclecie since 1968. It has 21 classrooms and two gyms. In the 2014/2015 school year, there were 13 classes with an average of 24 students each, as well as classes for children with disabilities,
- School complexes:
  1. Integrative Schools Complex No. 1 named after Robert Oszek (11 Bolesław Krzywousty Avenue) – established in 2006 following the merger of the school complex with Primary School No. 58 after its headquarters were relocated from Załęska Hałda (from the building at 149 F. Bocheński Street) to the premises of School No. 58 and the closure of Primary School No. 25. The complex consisted of:
    - Maria Dąbrowska Primary School with Integrative Classes No. 58 – a public school that was officially opened on 21 August 1976. In its first year of operation, approximately 1,700 students attended classes in 46 sections. In the 2014/2015 school year, it had 18 classes,
  2. General Education Schools Complex No. 3 (4 Bolesław Chrobry Street):
    - Special Primary School No. 60 in Katowice – established in 1962;
    - Henryk Sienkiewicz High School with Integrative Classes – a public high school established in 1955 as the TPD High School affiliated with Elementary School No. 9 in Koszutka. Since 1986, it has been located at 9 Bolesław Krzywousty Avenue in Lower Tysiąclecie. Since 1995, the school has been named after Henryk Sienkiewicz, and since 1 September 2012, it has been operating at its current location,
  3. Arts Schools Complex (7a Ułańska Street):
    - Fine Arts Secondary School;
    - General Arts School,
  4. Romuald Mielczarski Vocational Schools Complex (13 Bolesław Krzywousty Avenue),
- Arts schools:
  1. Karol Szymanowski State General Music School of the Second Level (7b Ułańska Street) – a school that combines music education with a general education curriculum, whose origins date back to 1937 as a two-year Music High School. It is part of the State Music Schools Complex in Katowice. The school has shared its current location with the School of Fine Arts since 1999,
- Higher education institutions:
  1. University of Occupational Safety Management (9 Bolesław Krzywousty Avenue) – a private university established in 2002 with a focus on the humanities and technology, specializing in occupational safety and health.

== Healthcare ==
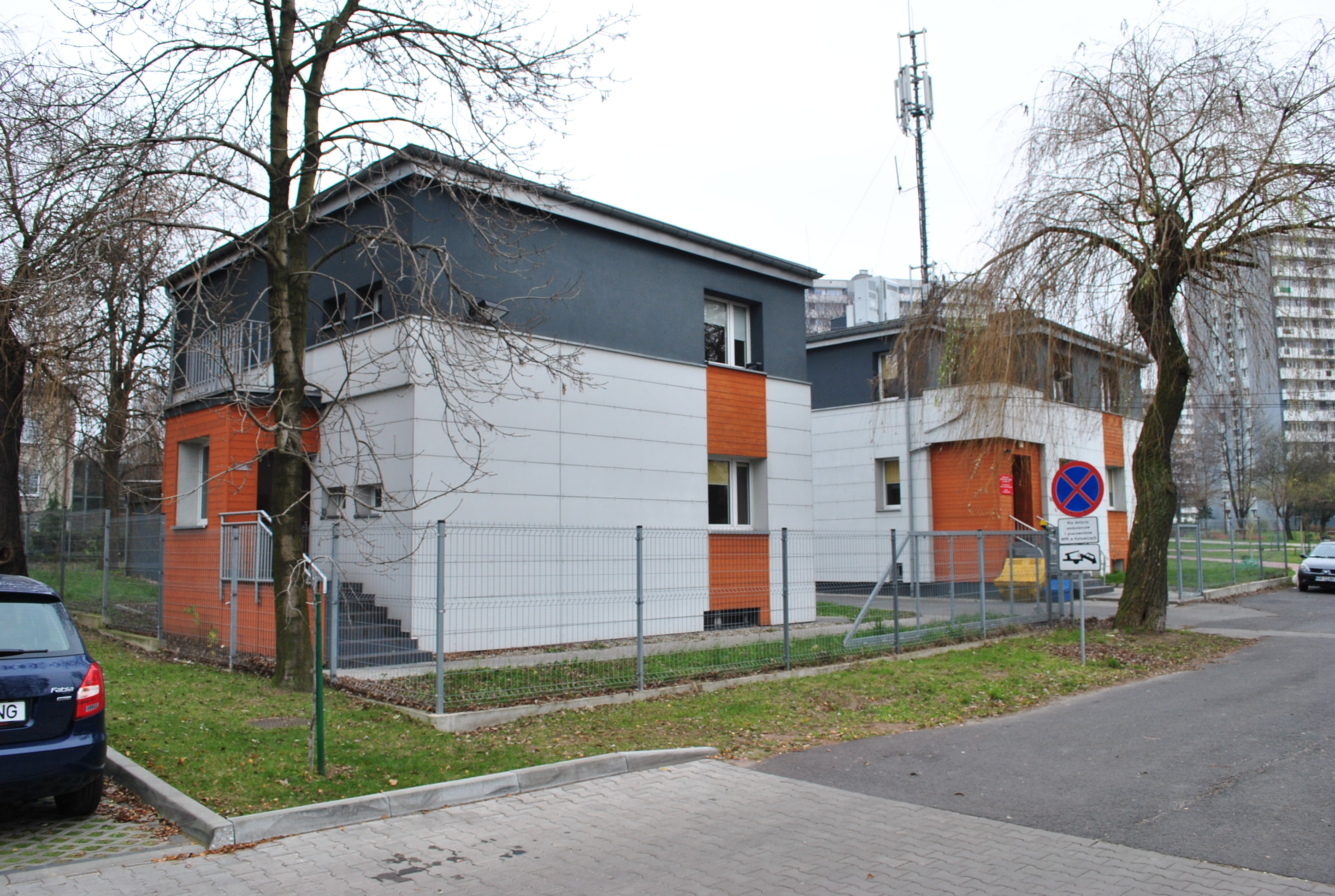
Sub-station of the Voivodeship Emergency Medical Service on Tysiąclecia Street (2014)

As of December 2018, the following healthcare facilities were located in Osiedle Tysiąclecia:

- Private General Medicine Medico Clinic (9 Zawisza Czarny Street);
- Private Epione Clinic No. 3 (7a Zawisza Czarny Street);
- Tysiąclecie Medical Centre (101 Tysiąclecia Street);
- Silesian Voivodeship Emergency Medical Service in Katowice. Sub-station Katowice Tysiąclecie (88b Tysiąclecia Street).

== Religion ==
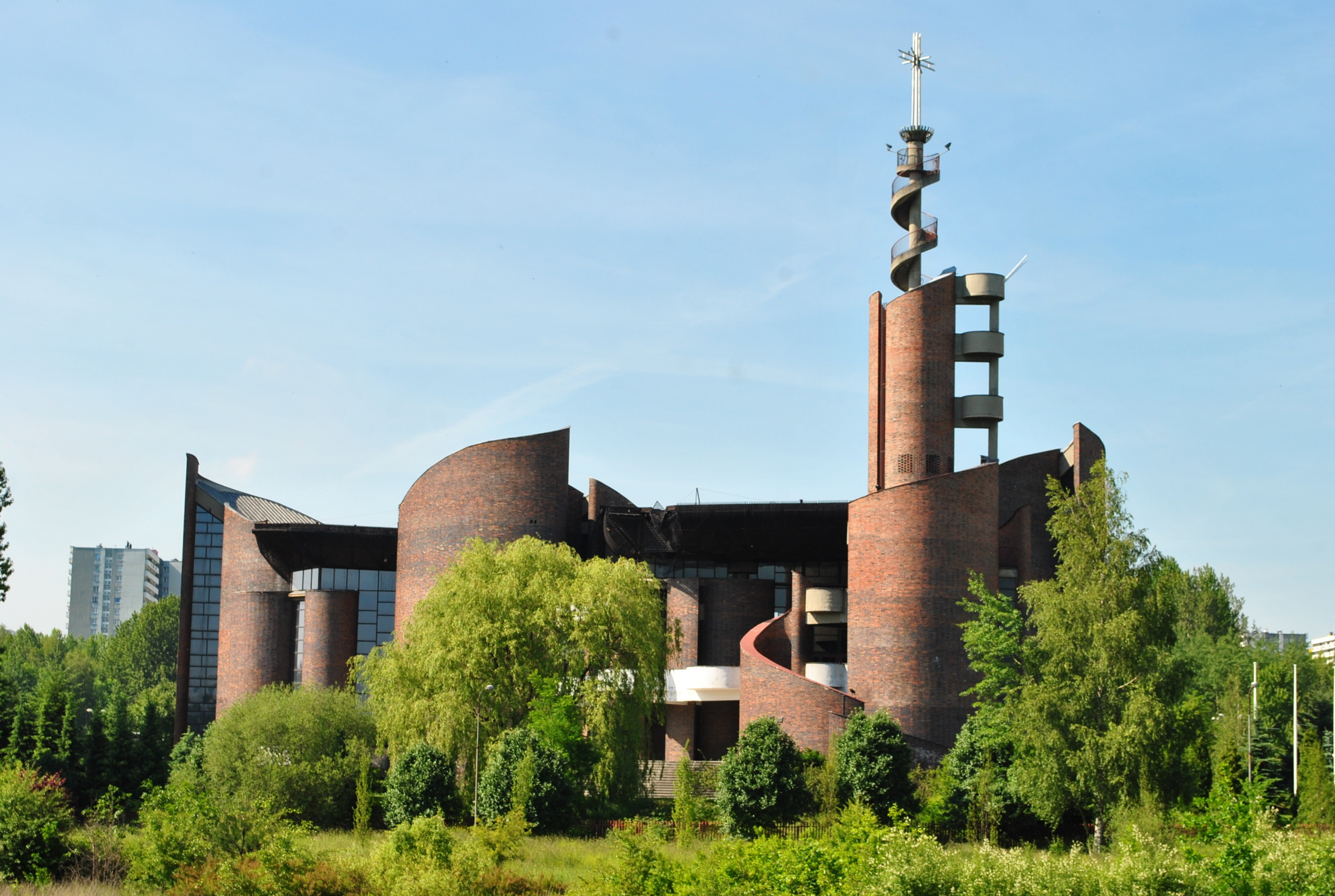
Church of the Exaltation of the Holy Cross and Our Lady Health of the Sick in Lower Tysiąclecie (2014)

The largest religious group in Osiedle Tysiąclecia are Roman Catholics. There are two parishes in the district, both belonging to the Katowice-Załęże deanery:

- Parish of the Exaltation of the Holy Cross and Our Lady Health of the Sick (6 Mieszko I Street) – covers Lower and Central Tysiąclecie. With the construction of the housing estate, parishioners from Lower Tysiąclecie attended the Church of Saints John and Paul Martyrs in Dąb. In 1976, permission was granted to build a church, which was dedicated on 13 December 1981, and on 14 September 1991, Bishop Damian Zimoń solemnly consecrated it.
- Parish of Our Lady of Piekary – covers Upper Tysiąclecie. The parish dates back to 1983, when Bishop Herbert Bednorz decided to establish a new parish in the Upper Housing Estate. Construction of the parish church (formally designated as a chapel) began on 13 June 1984. It was erected on 1 September 1985, and the parish church consecrated on 17 December 1990 by Bishop Damian Zimoń.

== Sport and recreation ==
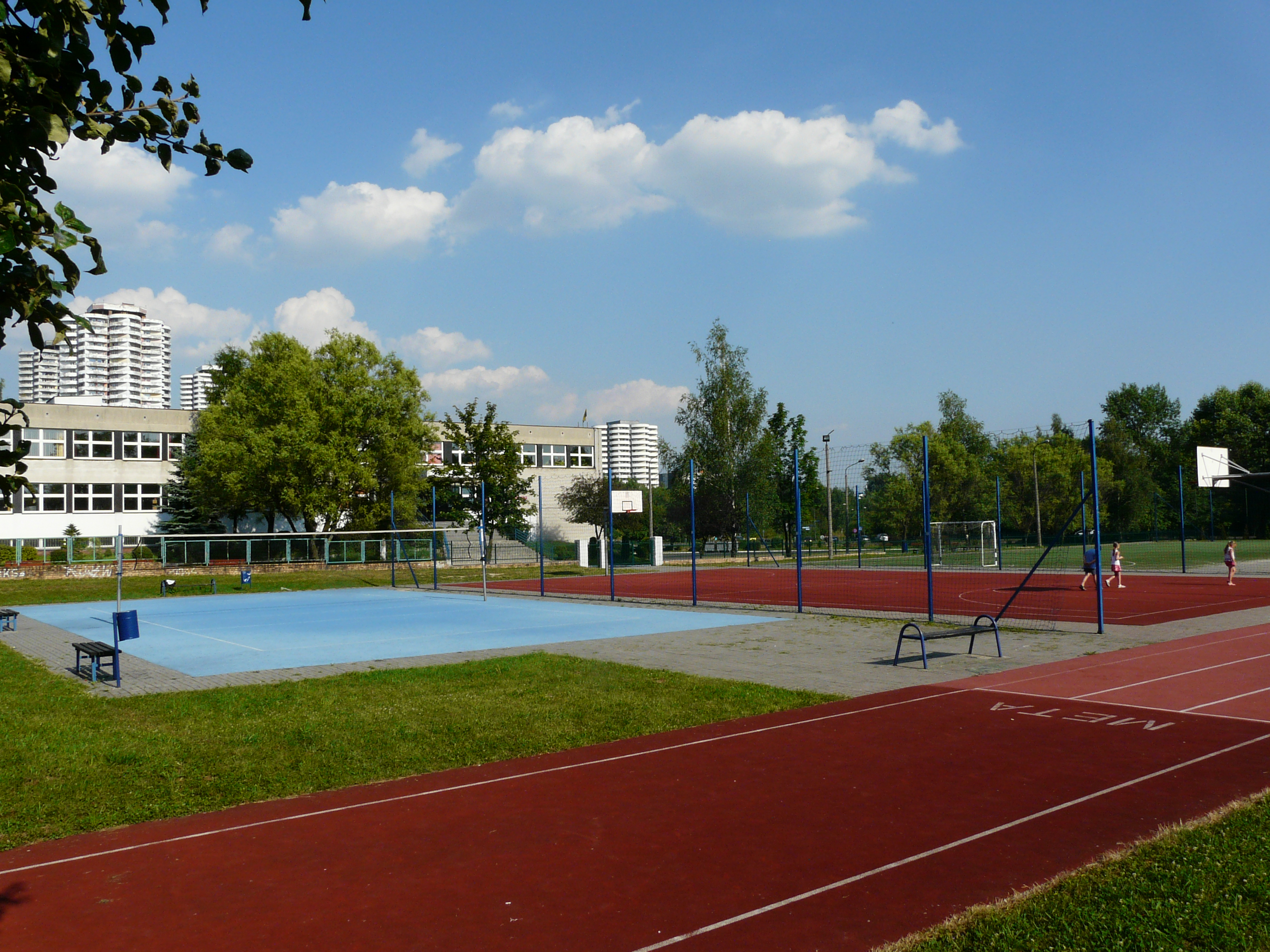
Sports complex at General Education Schools Complex No. 3 (2013)

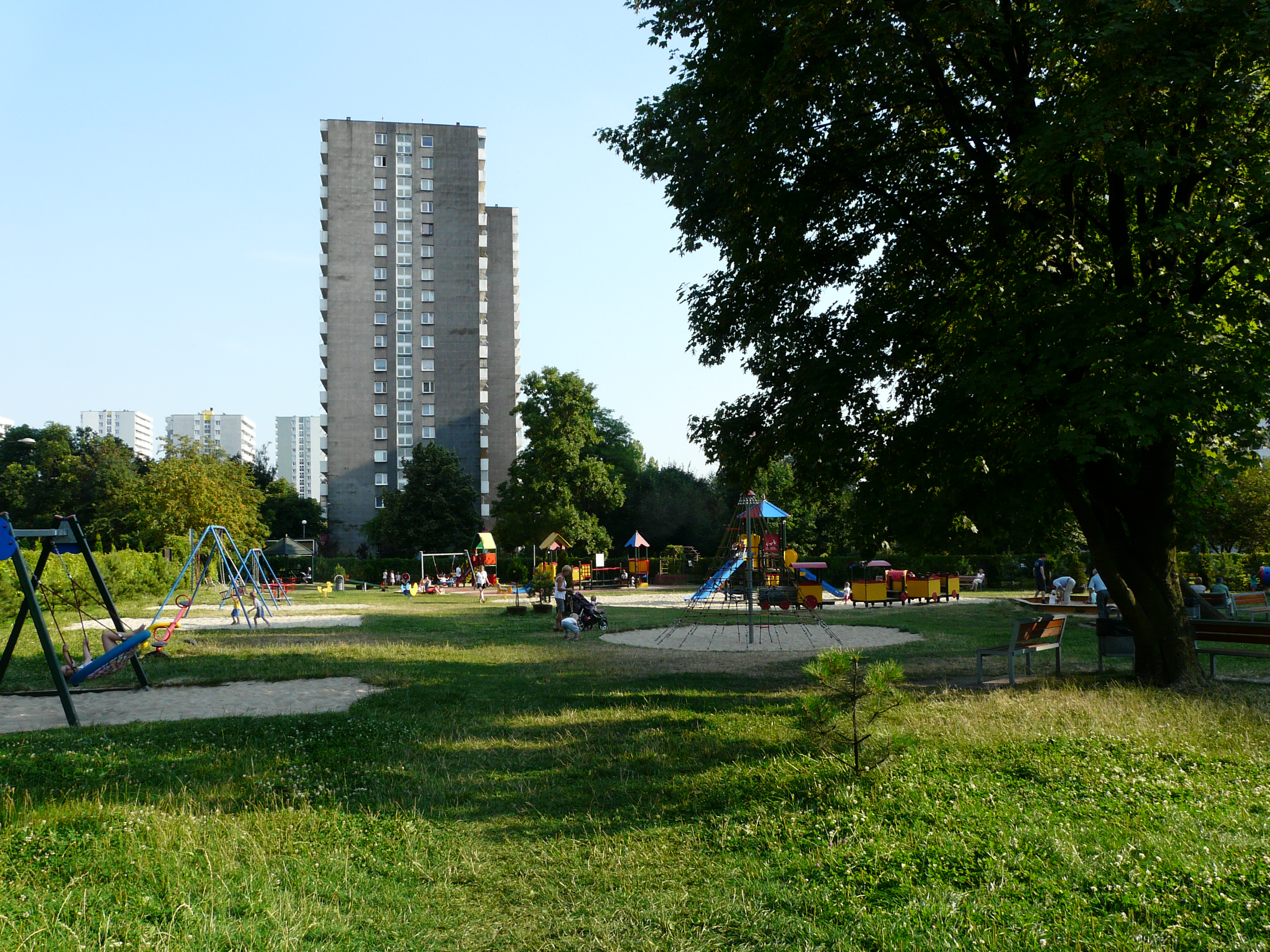
Playground at Osiedle Tysiąclecia (2013)

The residential nature of the district has led to the development of sports and recreational activities there, driven in particular by the presence of green spaces and the existing sports and recreational infrastructure. One of the main centers offering sports and recreational activities in the neighborhood is the Cooperative Cultural Center, located on Bolesław Chrobry Street. Classes are conducted there by both Cooperative Cultural Center instructors and private tenants. The center hosts fitness and Pilates classes, as well as sports and recreational activities for seniors. There is also a rehabilitation and physical therapy clinic on site. As of June 2013, the following sports clubs and sports and recreational associations are active in Osiedle Tysiąclecia:

- Maroko Community Water Sports and Fishing Club (17 Piastów Street) – a club of sailors, anglers, and other water sports enthusiasts, operating at Maroko Pond since 1995. It organizes sports and recreational activities for children and adults, as well as sailing courses. Sailing activities on the pond began in the 1980s, when the idea arose to transform the pond into a recreational center under the patronage of the Gottwald Coal Mine;
- Carramba Student Sports Club Katowice at Primary School No. 66 (88 Tysiąclecia Street).

In 2013, the following sports and recreational facilities were located within the district:

- school swimming pool open to the public at the Arts Schools Complex (7a Ułańska Street) – a 25-meter indoor municipal swimming pool;
- basketball court (Piastów Street);
- Family Activity Zone (Tysiąclecia Street, Jadwiga Avenue);
- training and recreational pools, school sports grounds, and playgrounds.

== Bibliography ==
- Absalon, Damian; Czaja, Stanisław; Jankowski, Andrzej T. (2012). "Środowisko geograficzne" [Geographical Environment]. Katowice. Środowisko, dzieje, kultura, język i społeczeństwo [Katowice. Environment, History, Culture, Language, and Society] (in Polish). Vol. 1. Katowice: Museum of History of Katowice. ISBN 978-83-8772-724-6.
- Komar, Beata (2012). "Analiza historyczna rozwoju osiedli mieszkaniowych na podstawie wybranych przykładów: Grünau w Lipsku i im. Tysiąclecia w Katowicach na tle wzorcowych koncepcji mieszkalnictwa XX wieku" [Historical Analysis of the Development of Housing Estates Based on Selected Examples: Grünau in Leipzig and Tysiąclecia in Katowice Against the Background of Model Housing Concepts of the 20th Century] (PDF). Architecturae et Artibus (in Polish). 4. Białystok. ISSN 2080-9638. Archived from the original (PDF) on 17 August 2017.
- Pszczółka, Patrycja; Pszczółka, Jacek (2011). Prognoza oddziaływania na środowisko miejscowego planu zagospodarowania przestrzennego obszaru Osiedla Tysiąclecia w Katowicach [Environmental Impact Forecast for the Zoning for the Area of Osiedle Tysiąclecia in Katowice] (in Polish). Katowice: Bogacz.
- Raport o stanie miasta Katowice [Report on the State of the City of Katowice] (in Polish). Katowice: Urząd Miasta Katowice. 2005. Archived from the original on 9 March 2016.
- Szaraniec, Lech (2010). Osady i osiedla Katowic [Settlements and Housing Estates of Katowice] (in Polish). Katowice: Śląsk. ISBN 978-83-7164-636-2.
- Zemła, Marek, ed. (25 April 2012). Studium uwarunkowań i kierunków zagospodarowania przestrzennego miasta Katowice – II edycja. Część 1. Uwarunkowania zagospodarowania przestrzennego [Study of the Conditions and Directions of Spatial Development of the City of Katowice – Second Edition. Part One. Conditions of Spatial Development] (PDF) (in Polish). Katowice: Biuro Rozwoju Regionu.
