= List of bishops of Katowice =

Bishops of Katowice archdiocese.

Diocesan bishops
August Hlond	1925–1926	
Arkadiusz Lisiecki	1926–1930	
Stanisław Adamski	1930–1967	
Franciszek Strzyż	1940–1942	
Franciszek Woźnica	1942–1945	
Filip Bednorz	1952–1954	
Jan Piskorz	1954–1956	
Herbert Bednorz	1967–1985	coadjutor from 1950
Damian Zimoń	1985–1992	
Archbishops and metropolitan bishops
Damian Zimoń	1992–2011	
Wiktor Skworc	2011–2023	
Adrian Galbas	2023–2024	coadjutor from 2021
Andrzej Przybylski	since 2025	
Suffragan bishops and auxiliary bishops
Teofil Bromboszcz	1934–1937	
Juliusz Bieniek	1937–1978	
Józef Kurpas	1962–1992	
Czesław Domin	1970–1992	
Janusz Zimniak	1980–1992	
Gerard Bernacki	1988–2012	
Piotr Libera	1996–2007	
Stefan Cichy	1998–2005	
Józef Kupny	2006–2013	
Marek Szkudło	since 2014	
Adam Wodarczyk	since 2014	
Grzegorz Olszowski	since 2018	
