= Osiedle Witosa =

District of Katowice

- Katowice District
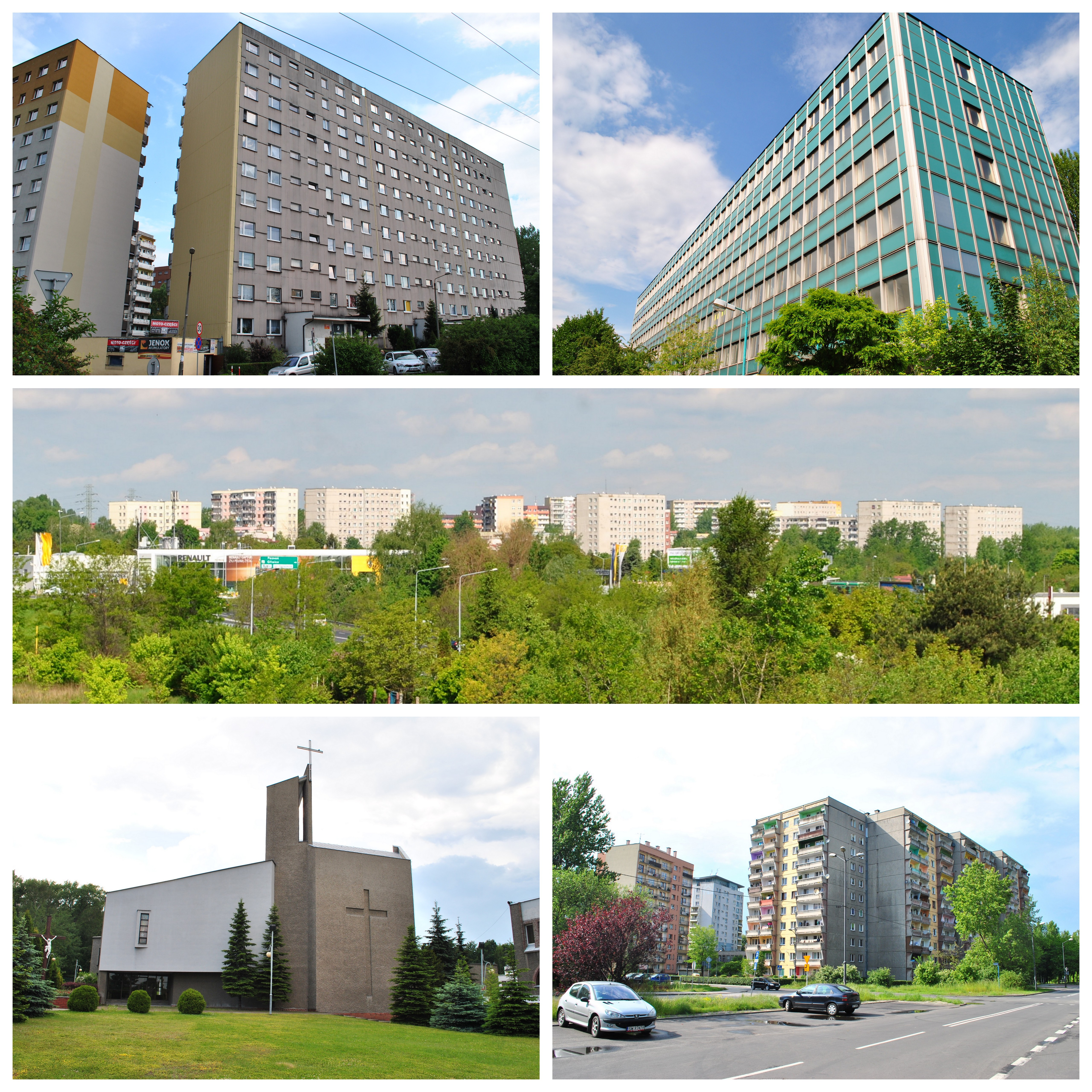
- Residential buildings at Maciej Rataj Street, office building at Stanisław Kossuth Street, general view from the south-east, parish Church of the Exaltation of the Holy Cross and St. Herbert, residential buildings at S. Kossuth Street

- Location of Osiedle Witosa within Katowice
- Coordinates: 50°15′34.439″N 18°58′07.437″E
- Country: Poland
- Voivodeship: Silesian
- County/City: Katowice
- Established: 1 January 1992

Area
  - Total: 3.49 km^{2} (1.35 sq mi)
- Elevation: 270–300 m (890–980 ft)

Population (2007)
  - Total: 12,401
  - Density: 3,550/km^{2} (9,200/sq mi)
- Time zone: UTC+1 (CET)
  - Summer (DST): UTC+2 (CEST)
- Area code: (+48) 032

Osiedle Witosa (Wincenty Witos Housing Estate) is a housing estate and district of Katowice, located in the northwestern part of the city, within the northern district group, between Załęże, Załęska Hałda-Brynów, and the city of Chorzów, on the territory of the historic Gmina Załęże.

The beginnings of settlement in the district are linked to the establishment of two colonies of Załęże in the area in the 18th century: Obroki and Załęska Hałda. The housing estate itself was built on the site of Finnish houses in the 1970s and 1980s. Currently, it is mainly residential and commercial. Osiedle Witosa is very well connected thanks to the A4 motorway running alongside it, as well as the E 30 international railway. It has an area of 3.49 km^{2} and in 2007 had 12,401 inhabitants.

== Geography ==
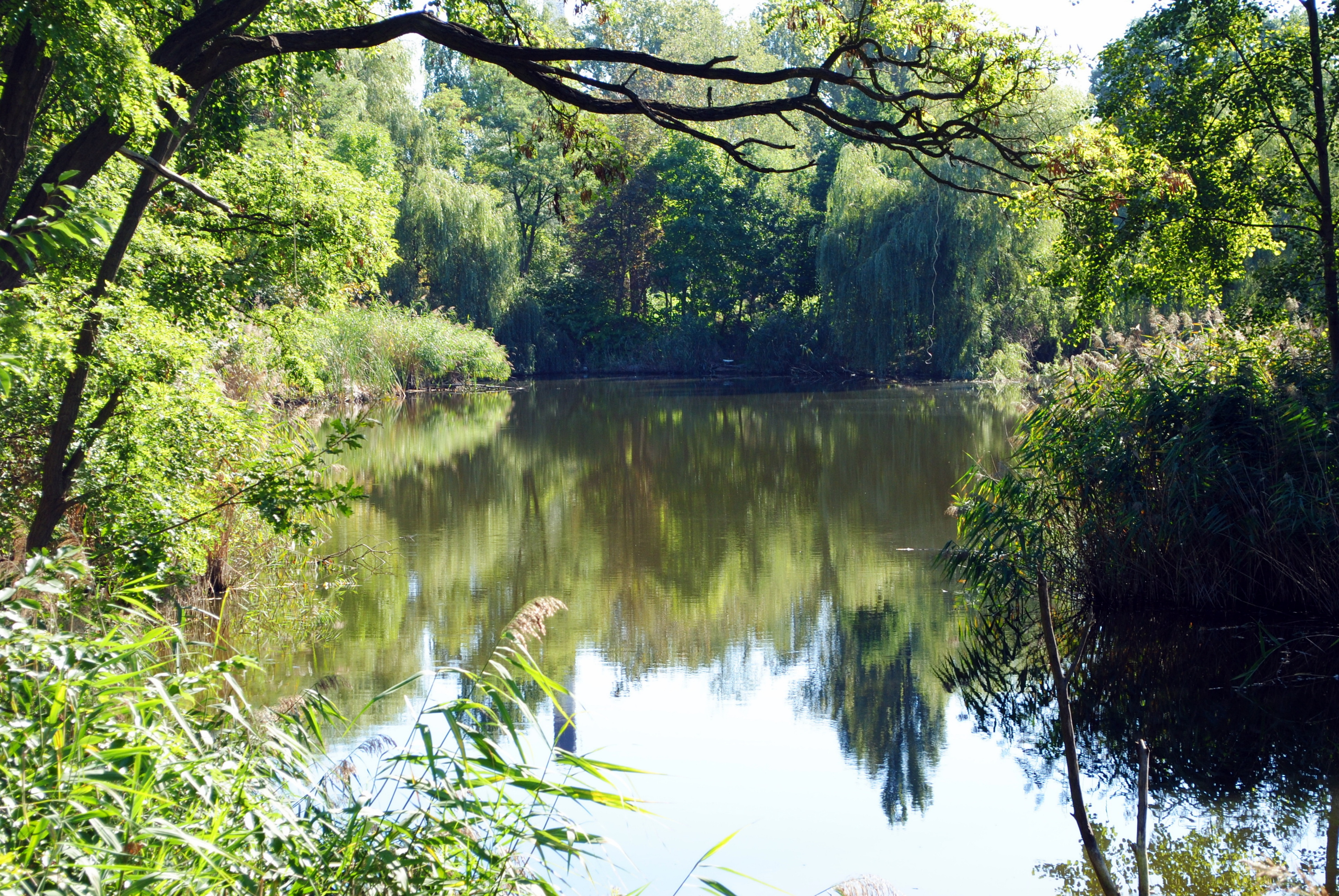
Kozubek Pond in Obroki

Osiedle Witosa is one of Katowice's districts (No. 8), belonging to the group of northern districts. It borders Załęże to the north and east, Załęska Hałda-Brynów to the south, and the city of Chorzów (with the district of Chorzów Batory) to the west. The district boundaries are:

- to the north – Katowice–Legnica railway,
- to the east – Feliks Bocheński Street,
- to the south – Kochłowicka Street (A4 motorway),
- to the west – the boundary with Chorzów.

According to Jerzy Kondracki's physio-geographical regionalization, Osiedle Witosa is located in the Katowice Upland mesoregion, which forms a part of the Silesian Upland, which in turn is part of the Silesian-Kraków Upland. Geologically, the district is located in the Upper Silesian Sinkhole, which is filled with Carboniferous sediments – mainly shales, sandstones, and conglomerates containing deposits of coal. The top of the Carboniferous strata is at an elevation of 220–240 m above sea level. Underneath it, there are sediments from the Devonian period, mainly marls, conglomerates, and dolomites. Above these are Quaternary deposits, mainly of glacial origin: tills, their weathered forms, and glacial sands and gravels in the northern part of the district, and sandstones, conglomerates, mudstones, claystones, and coal in the southern part. The soils in Osiedle Witosa have been subjected to strong anthropogenic pressure as a result of settlement and industrial activity, which is why the proportion of initial soils is significant there. The soils are mainly anthrosols, formed from tills.

The northern part of the Osiedle Witosa district, along Obroki Street, is located in the Rawa Depression, which stretches along the valley of the Rawa river. It is deeply cut (over 100 m) into Carboniferous formations. In the southern part of the district are the Kochłowice Hills, characterized by flattened terrain and locally cut deep valleys. The surface of Osiedle Witosa slopes downwards in a north-easterly direction, towards Rawa, following its course. The lowest point in the district is the intersection of Feliks Bocheński Street and J. Pukowiec Street (268 m above sea level), and the highest is Kochłowicka Street (A4 motorway) at the exit to the housing estate near the Chorzów Batory junction (309 m above sea level), from where the terrain rises towards the summit of Cisowa Góra in Załęska Hałda. At M. Rataj Street, the estate is located at 278 m above sea level, while at the entrance to the closed Kleofas Coal Mine (Obroki Street) the elevation is 277 m above sea level.

The climate of Osiedle Witosa differs slightly from the climatic conditions prevailing throughout Katowice. It is modified by both climatic and local factors, as well as by human activity. The average annual temperature in the period 1961–2005 was +8.1 °C. The warmest month is July (+17.8 °C) and the coldest is January (–2.2 °C). The average annual precipitation in the 1951–2005 period was 713.8 mm. The average duration of snow cover is 60–70 days, and the growing season lasts on average 200–220 days. The area is characterized by weak winds, with speeds not exceeding 2 m/s, blowing from the west.

Osiedle Witosa is located entirely within the Vistula drainage basin, in the basin of the Rawa river. However, it has no watercourses or larger bodies of water – the only larger water reservoir, Kozubek Pond, is on Obroki Street. It is an anthropogenic reservoir created after the closure of the Kleofas Coal Mine.

Although Osiedle Witosa is heavily urbanized, it has a fairly large proportion of green areas, especially forests (part of the Załęże Forest), located in the western part of the district. Oaks predominate there, and in the higher part of the area there are birch and pine complexes. These forests belong to the Katowice Forest Inspectorate and are not legally protected nature areas.

There are also allotment gardens in the district, located mainly in the south-eastern part of the estate. They are managed by the Silesian Regional Board of the Polish Allotment Gardens Union, Katowice Branch. The following Family Allotment Gardens are located in Osiedle Witosa: Baildon (6.95 ha), Gonar (2.87 ha), and Nadzieja (3.05 ha).

== History ==
=== Before the establishment ===
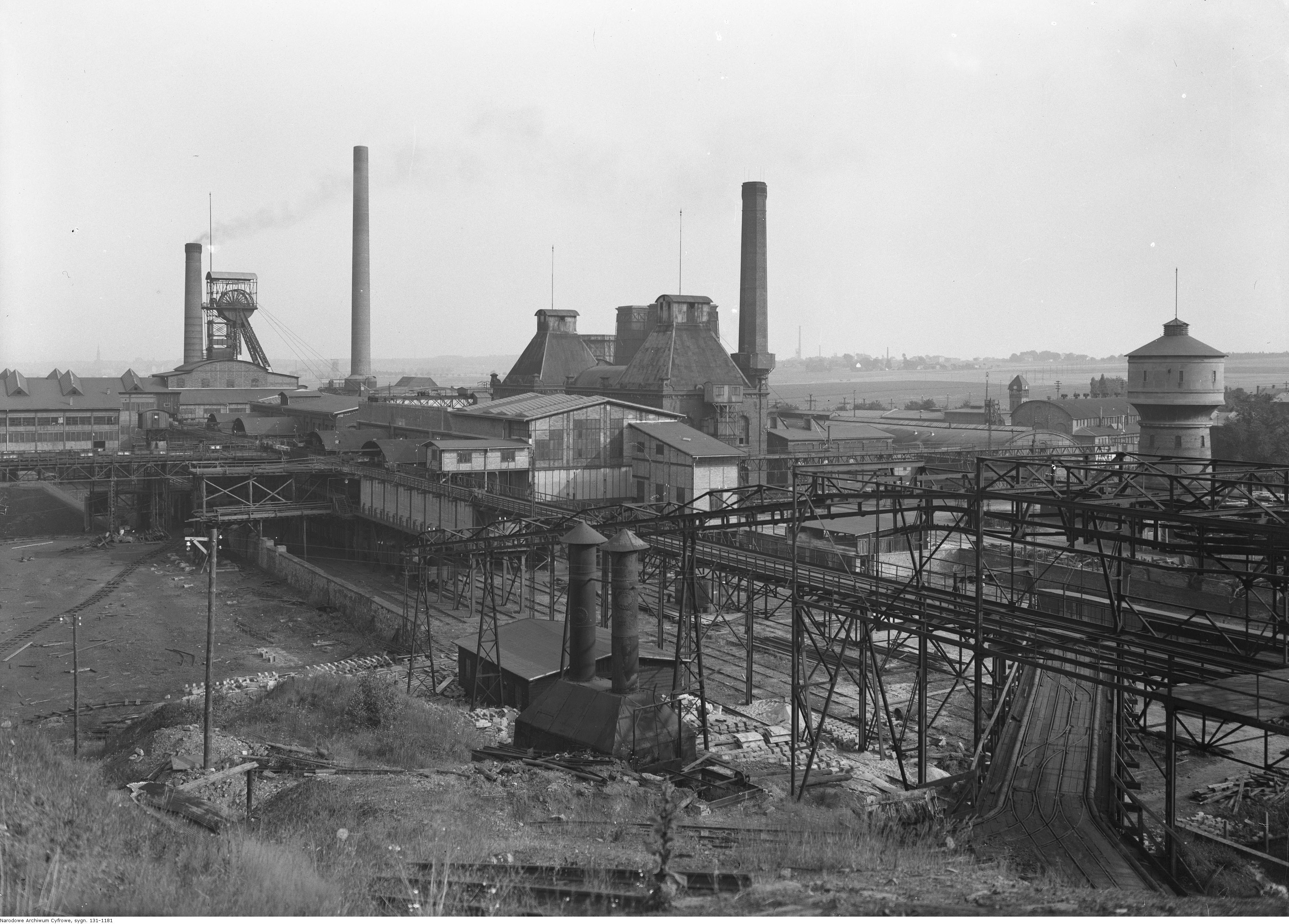
Kleofas Coal Mine in 1927

The earliest information about settlement in the area of the present district dates back to the 17th century with the mention of Obroki – a settlement located in the northern part of the district, which at that time was part of Załęże. From the 18th century, there was a folwark there where sheep were kept.

The further development of these areas is linked to the growth of industrial activity. On 3 October 1846, the Upper Silesian Railway opened the railway from Świętochłowice to Mysłowice, running along the border between the districts of Osiedle Witosa and Załęże, forming a part of the railway from Wrocław. In 1840, the Cleophas (later Kleofas) Coal Mine was established, which later contributed to the development of the district. The mine was not operational between 1867 and 1886; mining resumed after it was bought by Georg von Giesches Erben.

At the beginning of the 20th century, a company housing estate was built next to the mine, as well as the administrative buildings of the Kleofas Coal Mine. After World War II, the district continued to develop. Between 1947 and 1948, an estate of Finnish houses was built in the southern part of Osiedle Witosa, on the grounds of Załęska Hałda. An estate for miners of the Kleofas Coal Mine and the Gonar Mining Tools Factory was also opened in Obroki in the 1960s.

=== Construction and subsequent history ===
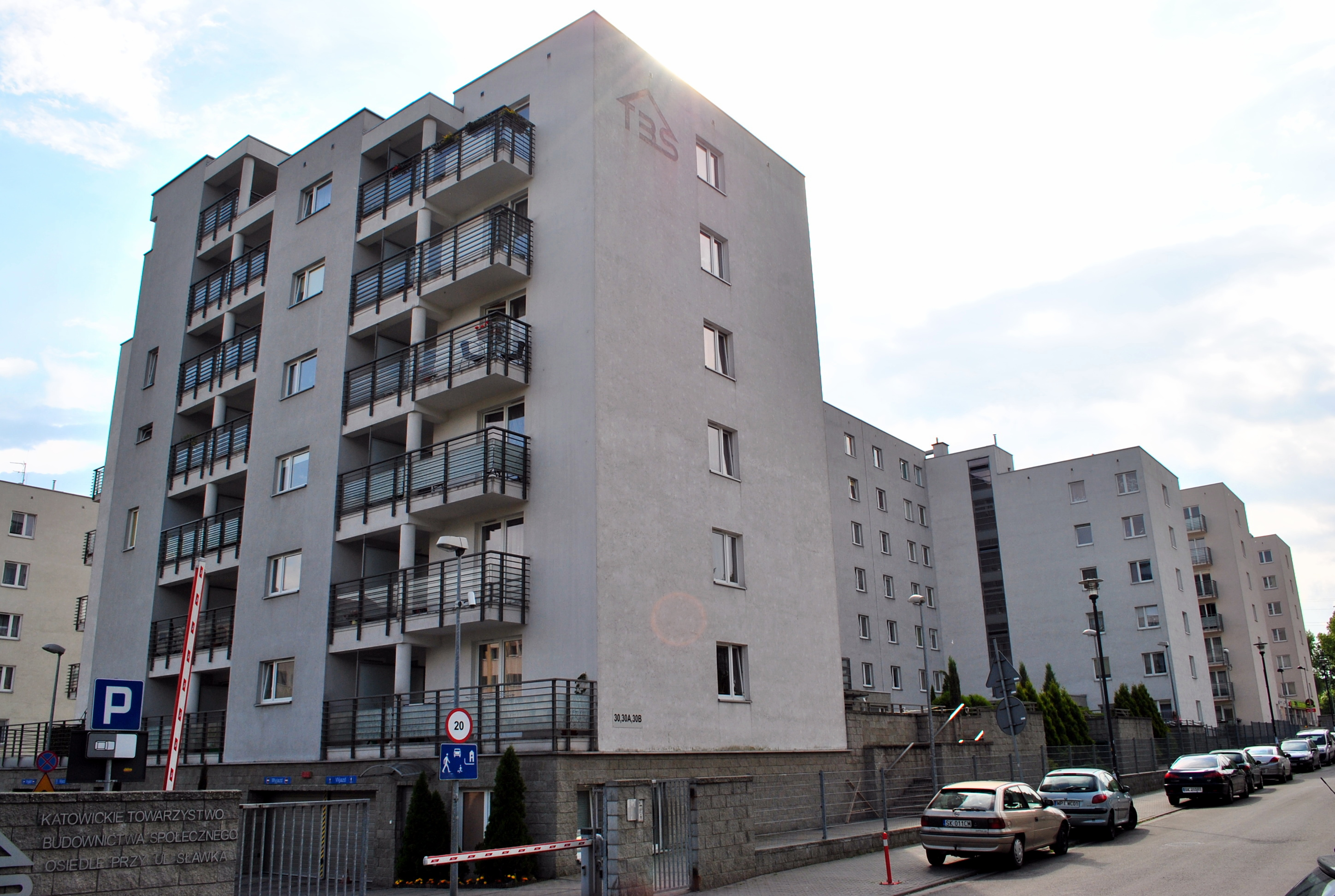
TBS residential buildings at W. Sławek Street, construction of which began in 2009

Osiedle Witosa was built on land occupied by a Finnish housing estate in Załęska Hałda, which was erected in the 1940s. In 1976, the demolition of the houses began, and with it the construction of a new estate, which was completed in 1981. It was designed by Jan Grzegorczyk, Marek Oleś, Jerzy Rak, and Andrzej Trybuś. In 1983, the estate was named after Wincenty Witos. On 14 September 1983, the Parish of the Exaltation of the Holy Cross and St. Herbert was established, but the parish church was not built until 10 years later. The building was consecrated by Archbishop of Katowice, Damian Zimoń, on 16 May 1993.

After the political transformation, 22 Auxiliary Local Government Units were created in Katowice on 1 January 1992, as a result of which Osiedle Witosa, together with Obroki, was separated from Załęże as a separate district called Osiedle Załęska Hałda. In accordance with Resolution No. XLVI/449/97 of the Katowice City Council of 29 September 1997, Osiedle Witosa is a statutory district in the northern district group and constitutes auxiliary unit No. 8 of the city of Katowice.

After 1989, as a result of economic restructuring, industrial activity in the district was significantly reduced. In 2001, it was decided to close the Kleofas Coal Mine, which finally took place in 2004. However, the service sector developed, and residential construction continued to grow, including new apartments in buildings owned by the Katowice Social Housing Association on W. Sławek Street, construction of which began in January 2009. By Resolution No. LII/1070/10 of 25 January 2009, the Katowice City Council named the square at the corner of Wincenty Witos and Michał Ossowski streets Witold Pilecki Square.

== Demography ==
Before Osiedle Witosa was built, the area belonged to Załęska Hałda in the former Gmina Załęże, which had a population of approximately 4,500 in 1980. In the 1980s and 1990s, there was a large increase in population due to the creation of the new Osiedle Witosa estate in the northern part of Załęska Hałda. In 1988, 14,041 people lived within the boundaries of the district. At that time, the population structure was dominated by people in the 30–44 and 0–14 age groups. In later years, the population continued to grow – in 1997, the district had approximately 14,200 inhabitants. Subsequently, the population declined. In 2007, the district had 12,401 inhabitants, of whom approximately 3,000 lived in Obroki and approximately 9,500 in Osiedle Witosa. The dominant age groups at that time were 45–59 and 15–29.

== Politics and administration ==
Originally, the area of Osiedle Witosa district was part of Gmina Załęże (the settlements of Obroki and Załęska Hałda). On 1 January 1992, 22 Auxiliary Local Government Units were created in Katowice, one of which, within the boundaries of the present district, was Osiedle Załęska Hałda. Under Resolution No. XLVI/449/97 of the Katowice City Council of 29 September 1997, Osiedle Witosa is a statutory district within the northern district group and constitutes Auxiliary Unit No. 8. The resolution also defined its exact boundaries.

The amended 2001 Act on Municipal Self-Government made it possible to obtain a by-law and appoint an Auxiliary Unit Council. In mid-2014, 11 districts had such councils, including Osiedle Witosa. The council is based at 8 E. Kwiatkowski Street. In the 2014–2018 term, the council had 15 councilors, with Krzysztof Kraus as Council Chairman and Marcin Waszczuk as chairman of the management board. In the elections to the Katowice City Council, the district belongs to constituency No. 4 (Osiedle Tysiąclecia, Dąb, Załęże, Osiedle Witosa, Załęska Hałda-Brynów). In 2010–2014, this constituency had 6 representatives in the City Council. Residents of Osiedle Witosa belonged to six general constituencies (21, 22, 23, 24, 25, and 26).

== Economy ==
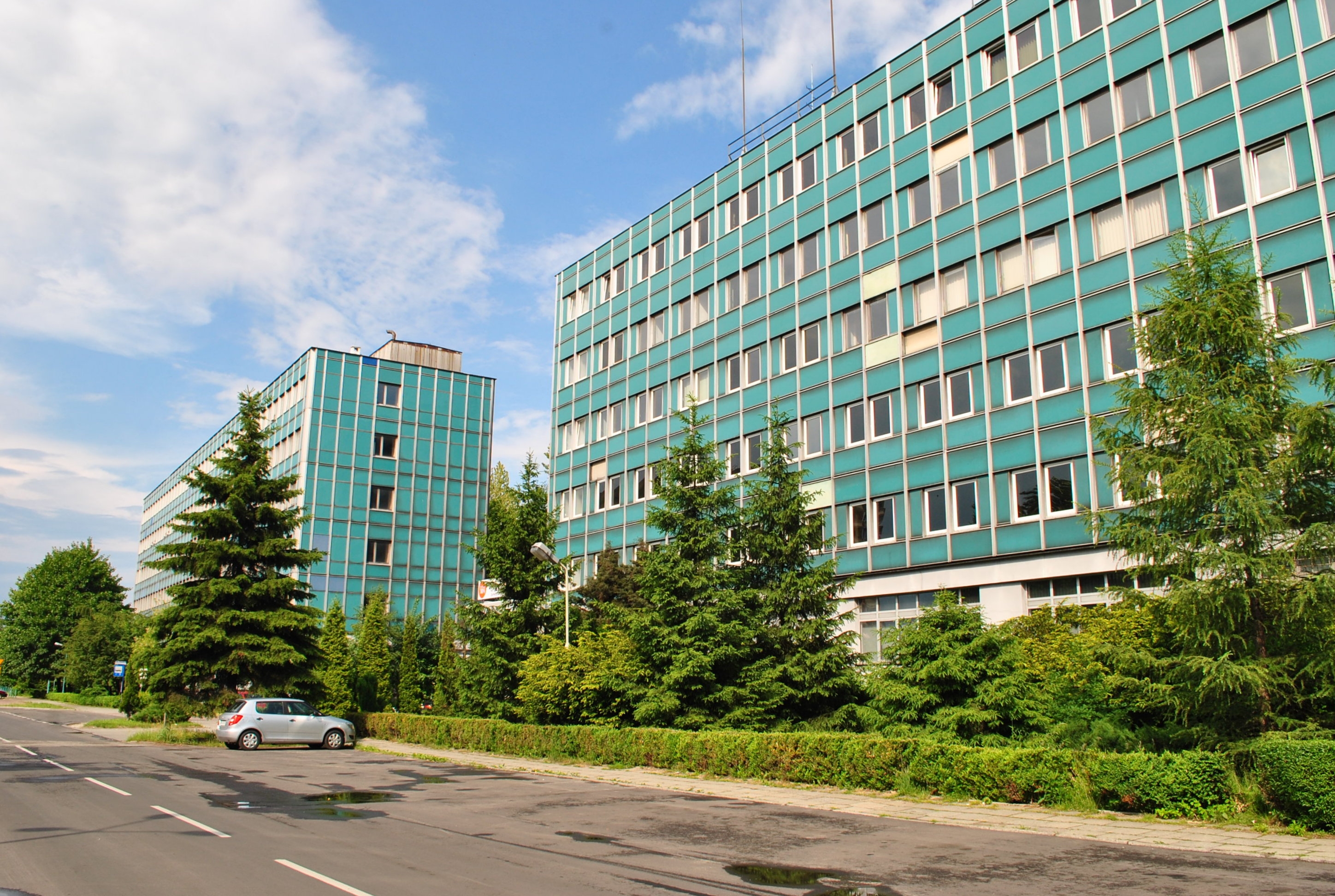
Office buildings at S. Kossuth Street in 2014

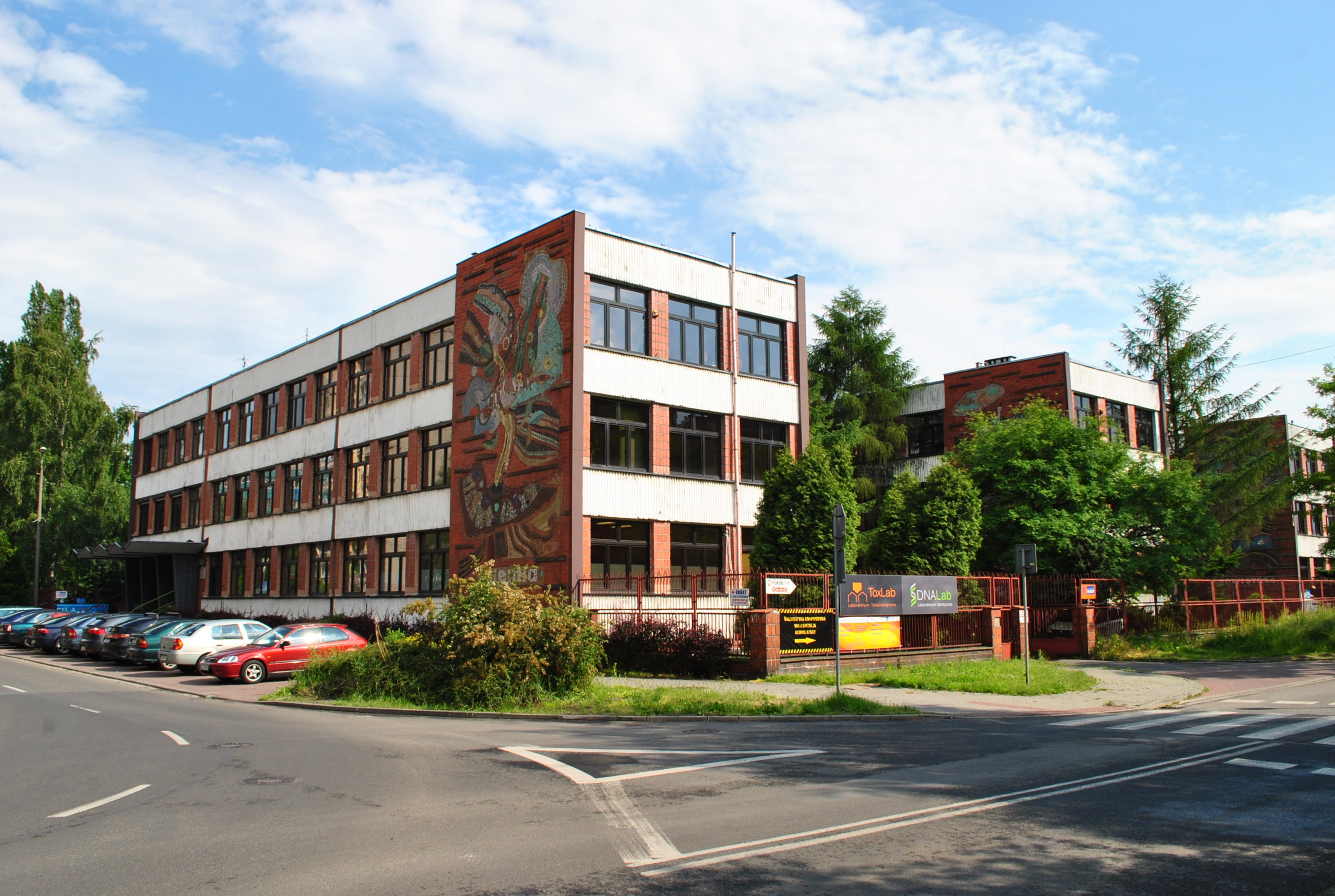
Headquarters of the Institute of Ecology of Industrial Areas

Poland's economic transformation after 1989 led to a significant decline in industry in the northwestern part of the district. This was especially true of the mining industry, as the Kleofas Coal Mine was closed down in 2004. To this day, however, GONAR, a company specializing in the production of mining tools, continues to operate in the district. The service sector has also developed, especially in the eastern part of the district, where a municipal market (Załęże bazaar) has been operating since 1991. In the western part, wholesale food trade has been developing since the 1990s. Currently, the Silesian Wholesale Market in Obroki is the largest market of its kind in Upper Silesia.

In the central part of Osiedle Witosa, there is a local service center concentrated around St. Herbert Square and along Wincenty Witos and E. Kwiatkowski streets. It is home to all local service facilities, including commercial establishments, educational institutions, a community center, a library, a church, public transport stops, as well as green and recreational areas.

Due to the residential nature of the district, there is a large network of shops of various types there. Among the large-format stores, the following facilities are located in Osiedle Witosa:

- Lewiatan (6 I. Mościcki Street),
- Lidl (50 Obroki Street).

In addition, the following administrative and municipal facilities are located in the district:

- Silesian Regional Branch of the National Health Fund (13 S. Kossuth Street),
- Regional Mining Office in Katowice (87 Obroki Street),
- Institute of Ecology of Industrial Areas (6 S. Kossuth Street),
- Municipal Utilities Company in Katowice (140 Obroki Street).

== Technical infrastructure ==
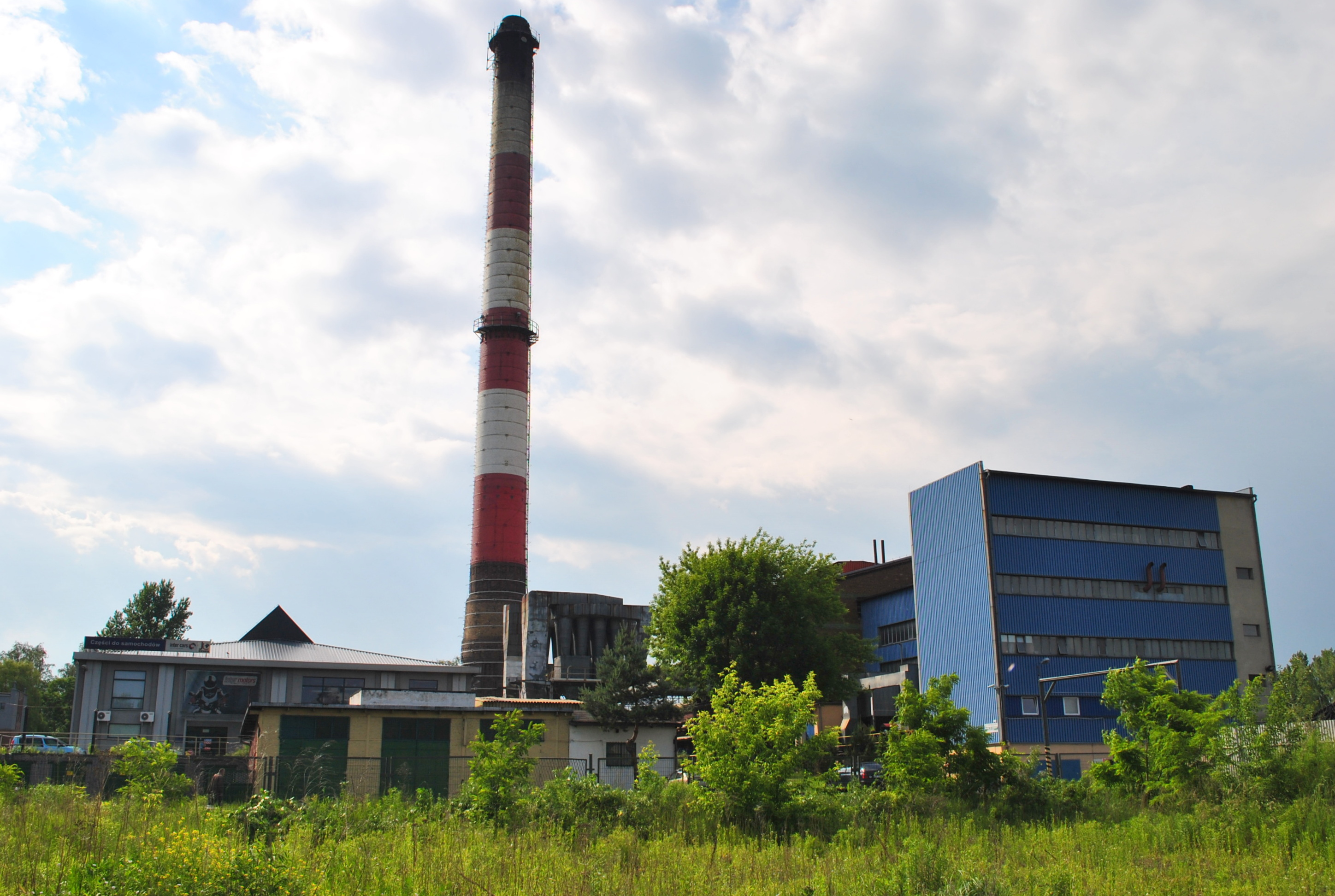
Dalkia Polska Energia – Kleofas Division (77 Obroki Street) in Obroki, supplying heat to Obroki and Osiedle Witosa

The main sources of water for the residents of the district are surface intakes on the Vistula (Goczałkowice Lake) and Soła (Czaniec Lake) rivers. Water from the Water Treatment Plant is distributed through main and distribution water pipes. The DN 1400 mm western main transmission pipeline runs through Osiedle Witosa, connecting the Murcki equalizing reservoir with the Bytków reservoir. Water supply is provided by Górnośląskie Przedsiębiorstwo Wodociągów and Katowickie Wodociągi. The sewage system is managed by Katowickie Wodociągi. The majority of Osiedle Witosa is located in the catchment area of the Centrum-Gigablok sewage treatment plant, which is connected to the combined sewer system.

The residents of Osiedle Witosa are supplied with electricity via a 110 kV high-voltage network connecting them to nearby power plants. The Obroki substation, with a transformation level of 110/6 kV, is located on Dulęba Street. The average electricity consumption per household in Katowice in 2006 was 865.7 kWh.

Heat is supplied by the Kleofas heating plant at 77 Obroki Street, which is a division of Dalkia Polska Energia, with a capacity of 42.8 MW. The district is home to the headquarters of the Municipal Utilities Company, which deals with waste management in the city.

== Transport ==
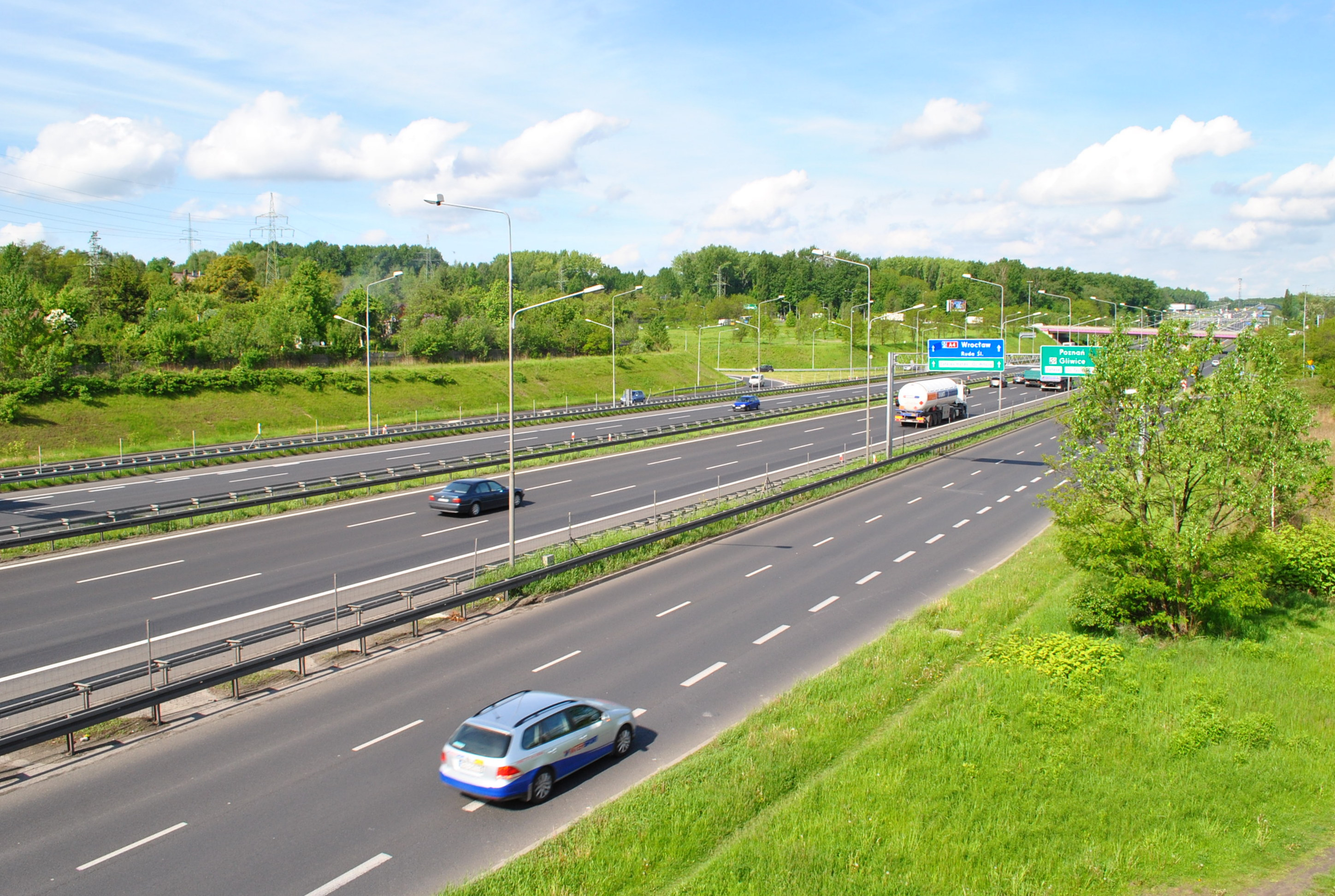
A4 motorway at the level of the disused railway viaduct

=== Road transport ===
Osiedle Witosa has very good transport links to the city center and the rest of the country. The A4 motorway runs along the border of the district. Its origins in the area date back to the 1950s, when an expressway was built between Katowice and Kochłowice.

=== Public transport ===
Public transport in Osiedle Witosa is provided by bus lines operated on behalf of the Metropolitan Transport Authority, running along the following streets: Obroki, Wincenty Witos, Stanisław Kossuth, Maciej Rataj, Michał Ossowski, and Eugeniusz Kwiatkowski. The bus lines running through the estate provide direct connections to Bogucice, Chorzów Batory, Chorzów II, Dąbrówka Mała, Dąb, Halemba, Janów-Nikiszowiec, Józefowiec, Kochłowice, Ligota-Panewniki, Ochojec, Osiedle Tysiąclecia, Piotrowice, Szopienice, Śródmieście, and Załęże.

== Architecture and monuments ==
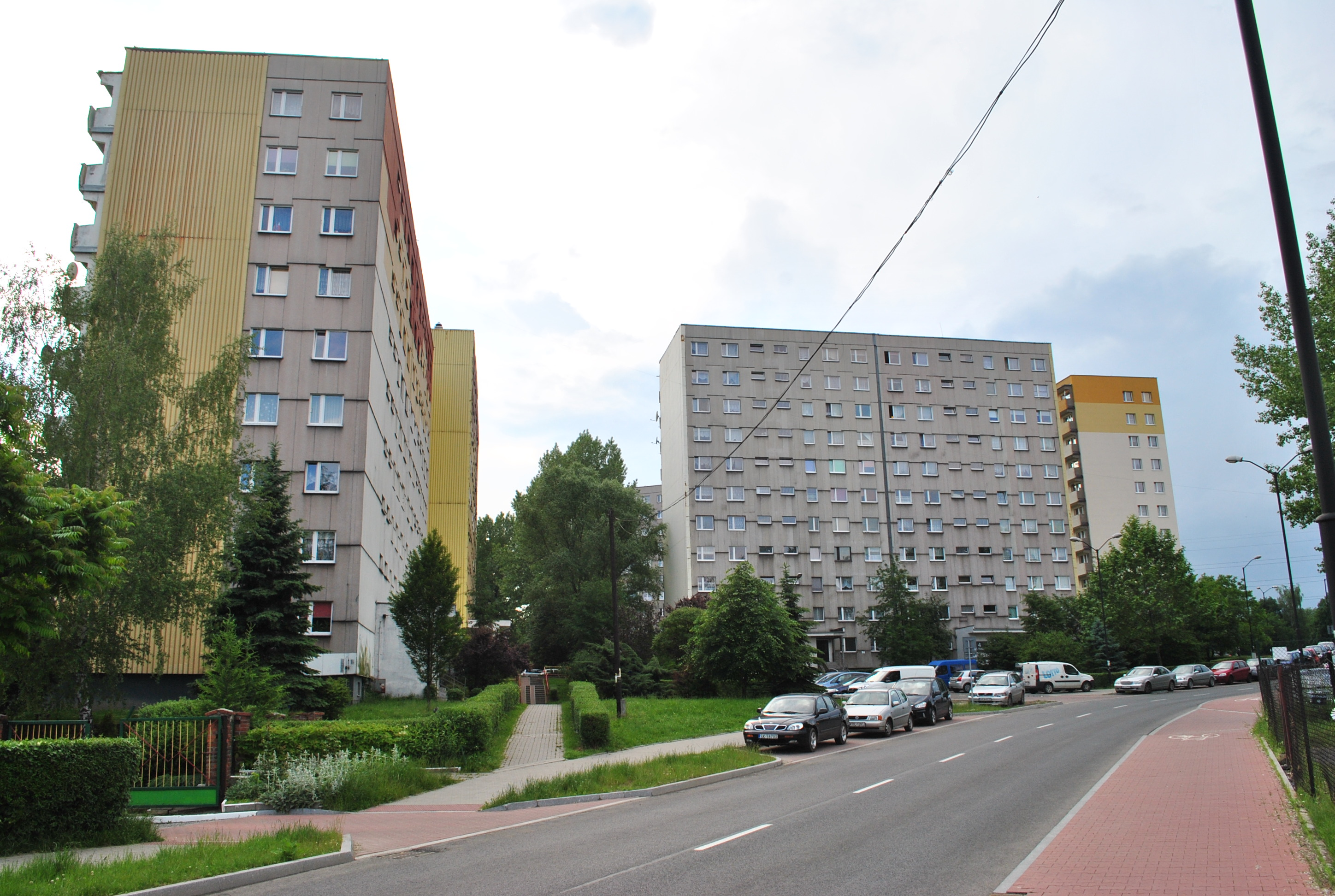
Residential buildings at M. Rataj Street

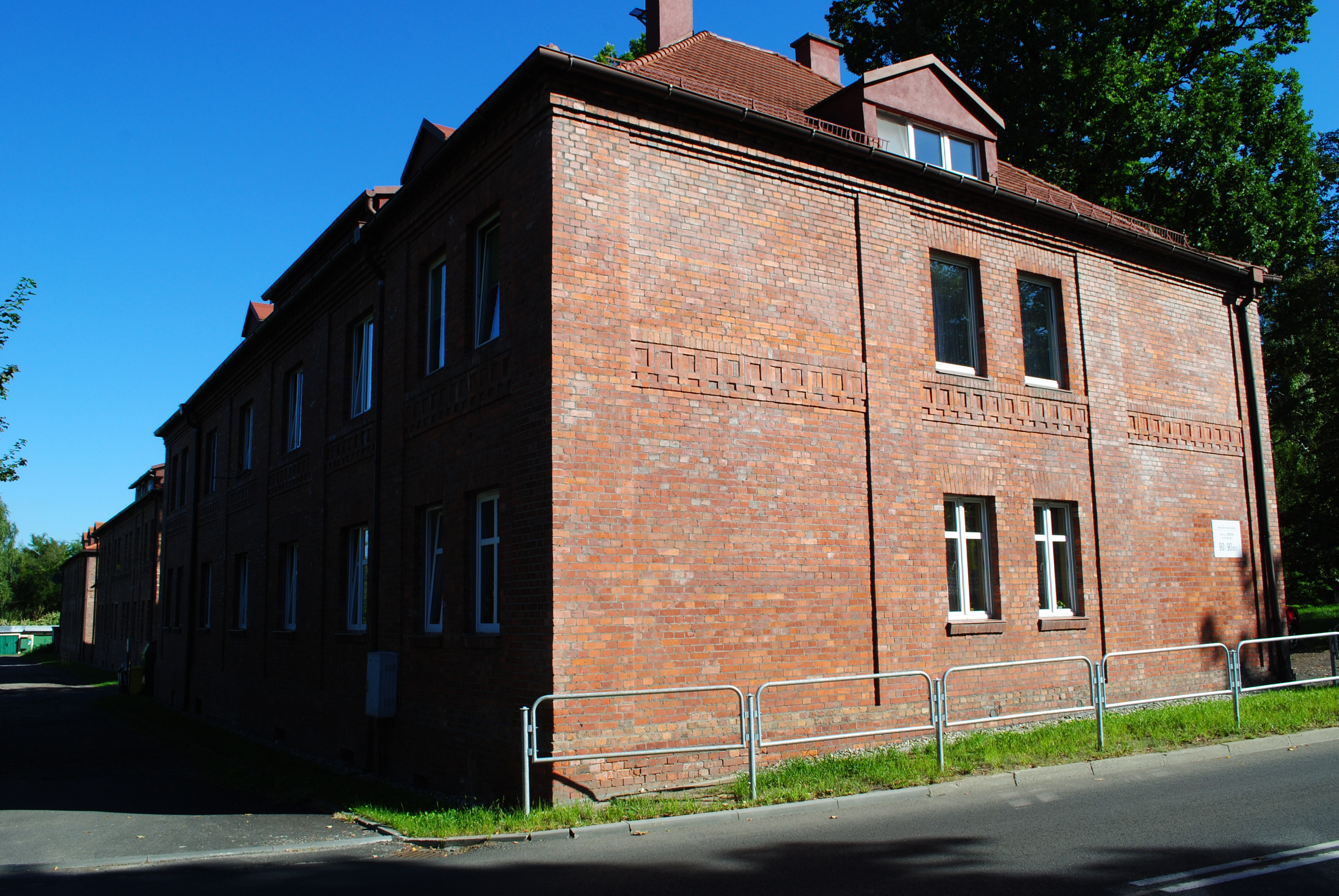
Residential buildings from the early 20th century on Obroki Street

The district's buildings are varied, especially in its northern part, Obroki, where there are residential buildings from the early 20th century, as well as low-rise apartment blocks made of large concrete slabs. Osiedle Witosa estate itself consists of a complex of stylistically uniform prefabricated apartment buildings: tall (up to eight stories) on N. Barlicki, M. Ossowski, and W. Witos streets, and low-rise on E. Kwiatkowski and W. Grabski streets. The estate is managed by the Załęska Hałda Housing Cooperative. It also includes complexes of townhouses (including on N. Barlicki, W. Grabski, and E. Kwiatkowski streets). The built-up area accounts for 17% of the total area of the district, the net floor area ratio is 0.77, and the weighted average number of storeys is 4.53.

The following historic buildings, protected by conservation orders, are located within the boundaries of the Osiedle Witosa district:

- Residential buildings with surrounding greenery (90, 90a, 90b, 90c Obroki Street). They date back to the early 20th century (erected between 1918 and 1923), and were built in the historicist brick style for the officials of the Kleofas Coal Mine.
- Former buildings of the Kleofas Coal Mine (77 Obroki Street). The historic buildings include: the former fire station, the former stable, the former mine rescue station, the former power plant (from 1893), the heating plant building (from 1895), the Fortuna III shaft head building, and the west section of the Fortuna I engine room building.

=== Monuments and commemorative plaques ===
The following memorial sites are located in Osiedle Witosa:

- A plaque commemorating Teofil Patalong, shot by the Germans on 6 September 1939 (on the façade of the viaduct over J. Pukowiec Street),
- A plaque commemorating soldiers of the Home Army and people who helped prisoners of the Auschwitz concentration camp between 1940 and 1945 (in the Witold Pilecki High School at 87 Obroki Street),
- A bust with a plaque commemorating Prof. Jerzy Rabsztyn (in the XV High School at 87 Obroki Street),
- Memorial Room for the Victims of Katyn (in Stanisław Ligoń Primary School at 23 W. Witos Street),
- A plaque dedicated to Witold Pilecki (Witold Pilecki Square).

== Culture ==
Branch No. 12 of the Municipal Public Library in Katowice is located in the district at 18b W. Witos Street. It has a section for children and adults, as well as an internet-connected computer station. The library's collection consists of approximately 21,100 volumes.

On 4 March 2025, the Municipal Cultural Center was officially opened in Osiedle Witosa in the area of E. Kwiatkowski and W. Grabski streets. It houses a multifunctional hall, as well as rooms for art and ceramics workshops, instrument lessons, and physical activities. It offers dance (including ballroom and Latin dance), art (including ceramics, drawing, and painting), physical activity, and developmental classes.

== Education ==
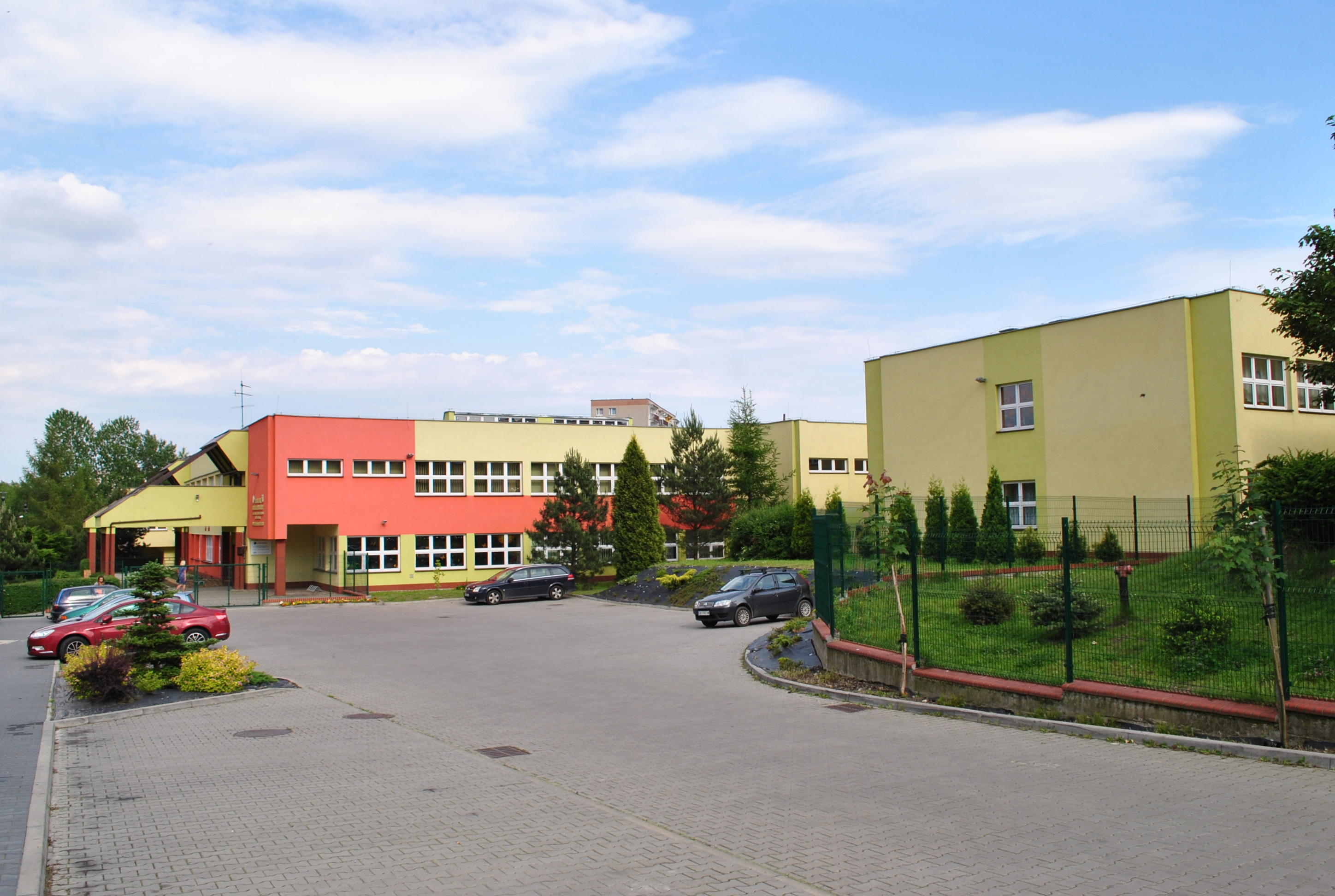
Building of Primary School No. 33 (23 W. Witos Street)

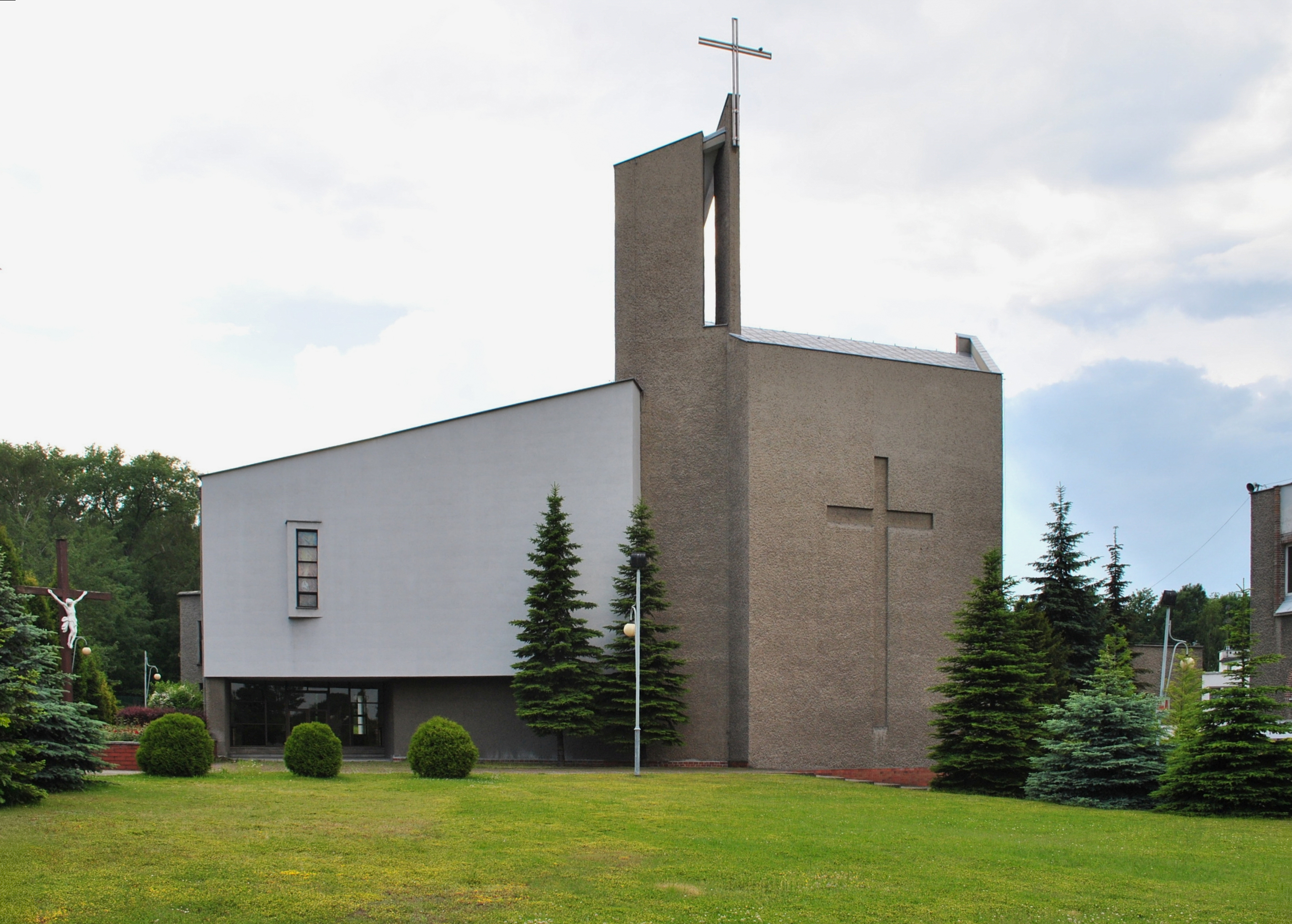
Church of the Parish of the Exaltation of the Holy Cross and St. Herbert

The educational infrastructure in the district is mainly concentrated in its southern part, in Osiedle Witosa estate. All existing institutions were established after World War II. One of the first schools in the district is the former industrial and mining school in Obroki (later the Witold Pilecki High School). It was established on 15 April 1945 and has been located at its current address, 87 Obroki Street, since 4 December 1973. One of the largest schools in the estate is Stanisław Ligoń Primary School at 23 W. Witos Street. It has been operating since 1957, when it had 419 students in 11 classes. The school has been located at its current address since 1986 (until 1968, the school operated in two buildings – at T. Patalong Street and S. Kossuth Street). Until the 2017 education reform, Junior High School No. 6 operated within the school's walls. Among others, Polish footballer Arkadiusz Milik graduated from both the primary school and the junior high school.

As of mid-2023, the following educational institutions were also operating in Osiedle Witosa:

- Słonik Private Nursery and Integrated Kindergarten (70 Obroki Street),
- U Cioci Poli Private Nursery (77 Obroki Street),
- Municipal Kindergarten No. 13 (16a W. Witos Street),
- Municipal Kindergarten No. 50 with Integration Units (2 I. Mościcki Street),
- Municipal Kindergarten No. 85 (20 E. Kwiatkowski Street),
- Little Prince Municipal Kindergarten No. 94 (10 M. Rataj Street),
- Witold Pilecki High School (87 Obroki Street),
- Private Schools Complex (18 W. Witos Street): Domowe Przedszkole Private Kindergarten, Szkoła jak Dom Private Primary School, Melchior Wańkowicz Private High School with International Baccalaureate, Complex of Silesian International Schools.

== Religion ==
The largest religious community in Osiedle Witosa is the Roman Catholic Parish of the Exaltation of the Holy Cross and St. Herbert, which covers the entire district and had approximately 13,850 parishioners in 2014. It belongs to the Katowice-Załęże deanery. It was established on 14 September 1982 by decree of the then ordinary of the Diocese of Katowice, Bishop Herbert Bednorz. Construction of the Church of the Exaltation of the Holy Cross and St. Herbert was completed in 1992, with interior designed by Piotr Kłosek. On 16 May 1993, the Archbishop Metropolitan of Katowice, Damian Zimoń, consecrated the church.

== Sport and recreation ==
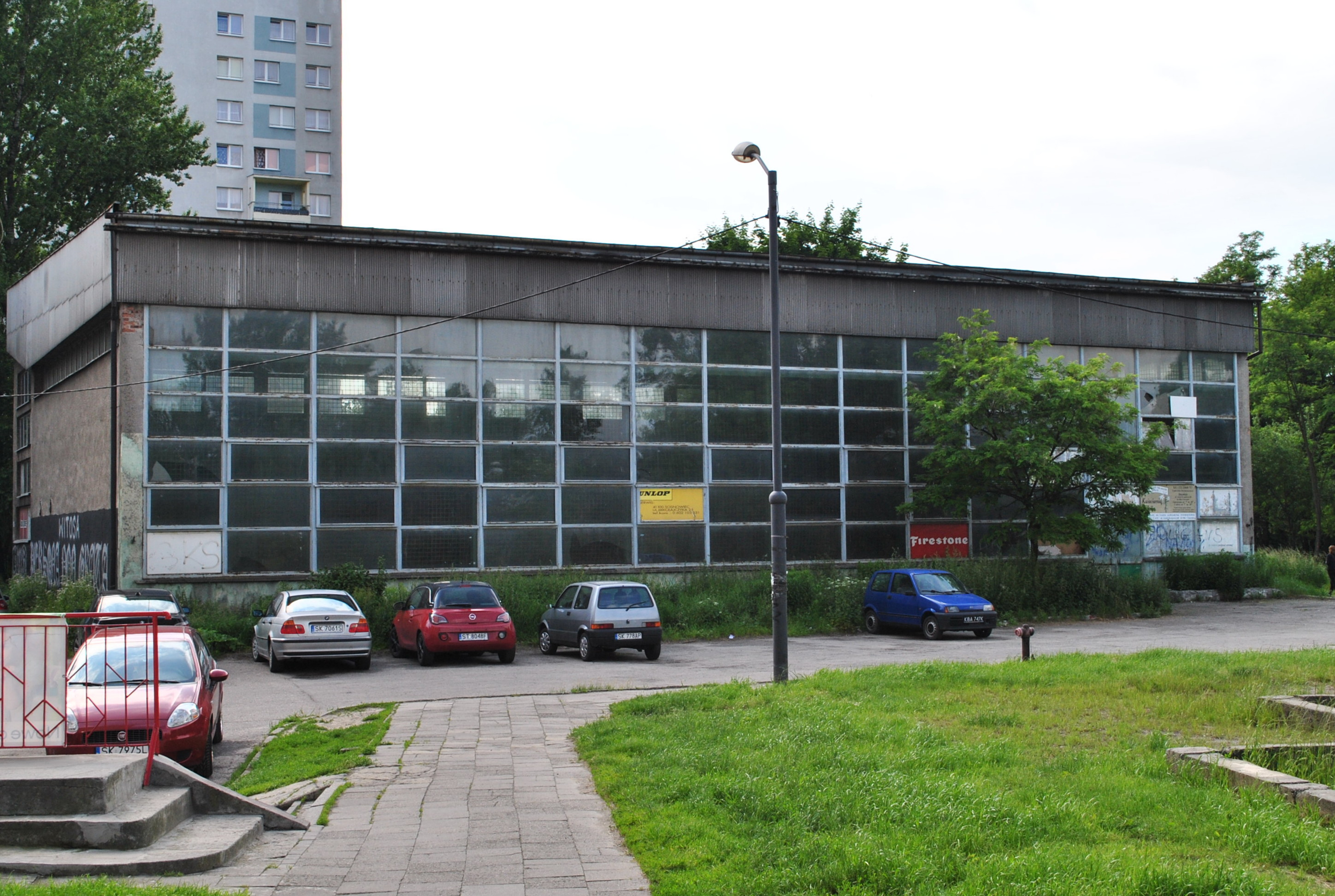
Former sports hall of the 06 Kleofas Katowice club (2014)

Sport in Osiedle Witosa developed mainly on the initiative of the employees of the Kleofas Coal Mine. One of the most important clubs operating in the district in the past was the 06 Kleofas Katowice boxing club. It was founded on 23 August 1906 in Załęże under the name "Sportverein Zalenze", renamed "Sport-Club Zalenze" in 1910. Until 1925, only the football section operated in the club, while the boxing one was established in 1957. In 2006, the club celebrated its 100th anniversary. It was based in a hall at 43 Obroki Street, which no longer exists, and is currently located at 1 Bukowa Street in Dąb.

== Bibliography ==
- Absalon, Damian; Czaja, Stanisław; Jankowski, Andrzej T. (2012). "Środowisko geograficzne" [Geographical Environment]. In Barciak, Antoni; Chojecka, Ewa; Fertacz, Sylwester (eds.). Katowice. Środowisko, dzieje, kultura, język i społeczeństwo [Katowice: Environment, History, Culture, Language and Society] (in Polish). Vol. 1. Katowice: Museum of the History of Katowice. ISBN 978-83-87727-24-6.
- Szaraniec, Lech (2010). Osady i osiedla Katowic [Settlements and Housing Estates of Katowice] (in Polish). Katowice: Śląsk. ISBN 978-83-7164-636-2.
- Tofilska, Joanna; Steuer, Antoni (2012). "Osady i osiedla" [Settlements and Estates]. In Barciak, Antoni; Chojecka, Ewa; Fertacz, Sylwester (eds.). Katowice. Środowisko, dzieje, kultura, język i społeczeństwo [Katowice: Environment, History, Culture, Language and Society] (in Polish). Vol. 2. Katowice: Museum of the History of Katowice. ISBN 978-83-87727-24-6.
