= Bednorz =

People with the surname Bednorz include:

- Bartosz Bednorz (born 1994), Polish volleyball player
- Filip Bednorz (1891–1954), Bishop of Katowice from 1952 to 1954
- Herbert Bednorz (1908–1989), Bishop of Katowice from 1967 to 1985
- Johannes Georg Bednorz (born 1950), a Nobel laureate in physics
- Robert Bednorz (1882–1973), a German sculptor (de:Robert Bednorz)
