= Dean's Palace, Warsaw =

Historic building in Warsaw, Poland

Dean's Palace in Warsaw
- Pałac Dziekana w Warszawie (Polish)
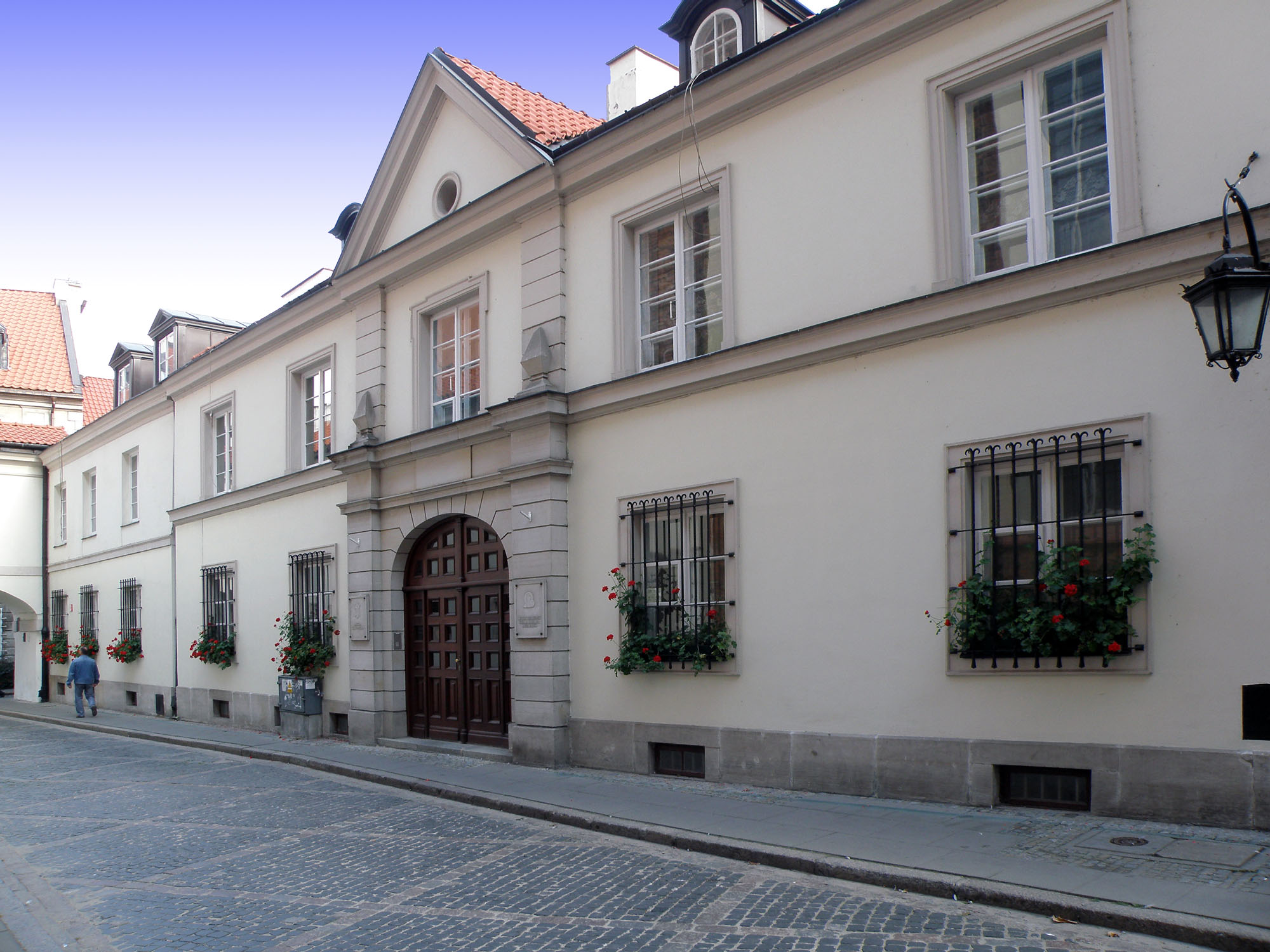
- Dean's Palace

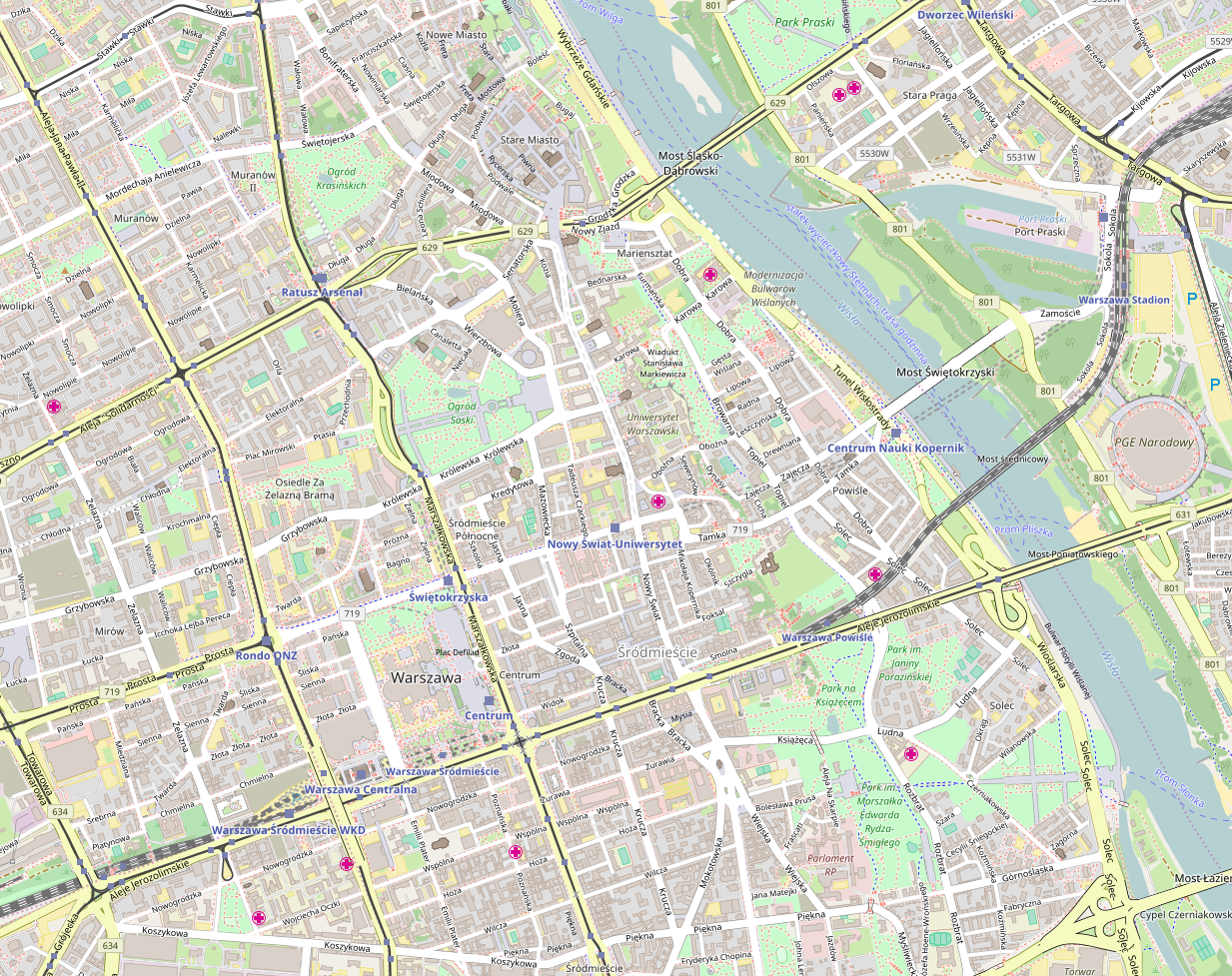
- Location of the Dean's Palace in Warsaw
- Location: Warsaw, Masovian Voivodeship; in Poland

History
- Built: 15th/16th century
- Demolished: 1944
- Rebuilt: 1966-68

Site notes
- Architectural style: Classicist

UNESCO World Heritage Site
- Type: Cultural
- Criteria: ii, vi
- Designated: 1980
- Part of: Historic Centre of Warsaw
- Reference no.: 30bis

Historic Monument of Poland
- Designated: 1994-09-08
- Part of: Warsaw – historic city center with the Royal Route and Wilanów
- Reference no.: M.P. 1994 nr 50 poz. 423

The Dean's Palace (Polish: Pałac Dziekana) is a historic building located on Dziekania Street in the Old Town of Warsaw, Poland.

Since 2016, the Dean's Palace has been the home of the Museum of the Archdiocese of Warsaw.

== History ==
In the fourteenth century, as mentioned in historic sources of 1339, the present site of the Dean's Palace was the location of the former rectory of St. John's Church.

The Dean's Palace's masonry building was constructed at the turn of the fifteenth and sixteenth centuries on a large plot of land ceded by the Royal Castle. In 1607, the building burned in a city fire. Three years later, it was rebuilt as a residence for Dean J. Raciborski. In the 18th century, it was home to a theological seminary. In 1838, the palace's grounds were reduced in favor of the Castle, and in 1844 the building was converted into a tenement house. In 1870–1939, the Dean's Palace housed offices and Castle employees.

During the 1944 Warsaw Uprising, the building suffered substantial damage. Only small fragments of the ground floor and first floor survived. Almost all of Dziekania (Dean's Palace) Street, including St. John's Cathedral, was destroyed by the explosion of a German Goliath tracked mine.

In 1966-68, the Dean's Palace was rebuilt to a design by Stanisław Marzyński, with a somewhat modified appearance relative to its prewar one.

Since 2016, the Dean's Palace has been home to the Museum of the Archdiocese of Warsaw.

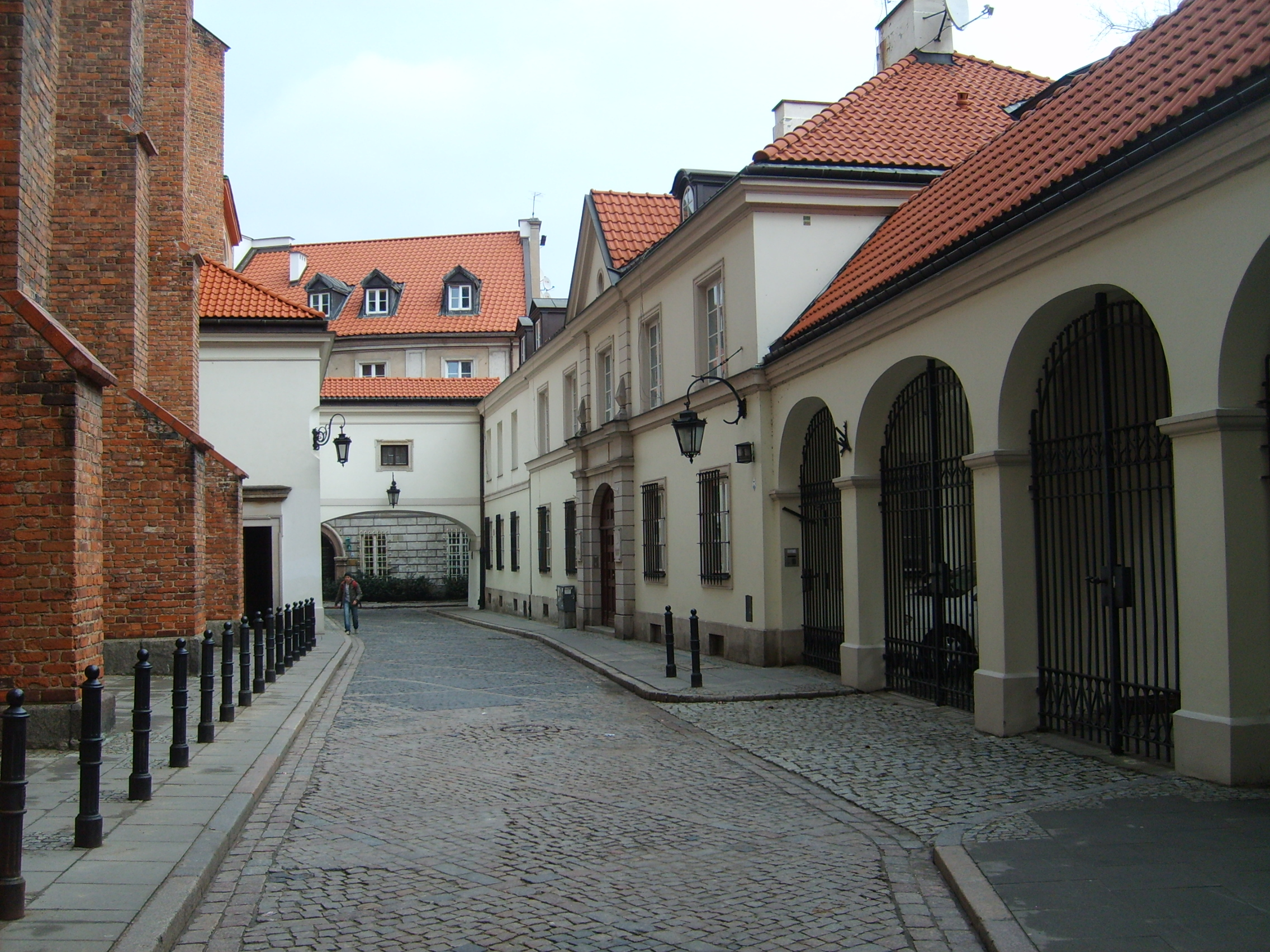
Dean's Palace Street, with Dean's Palace at right

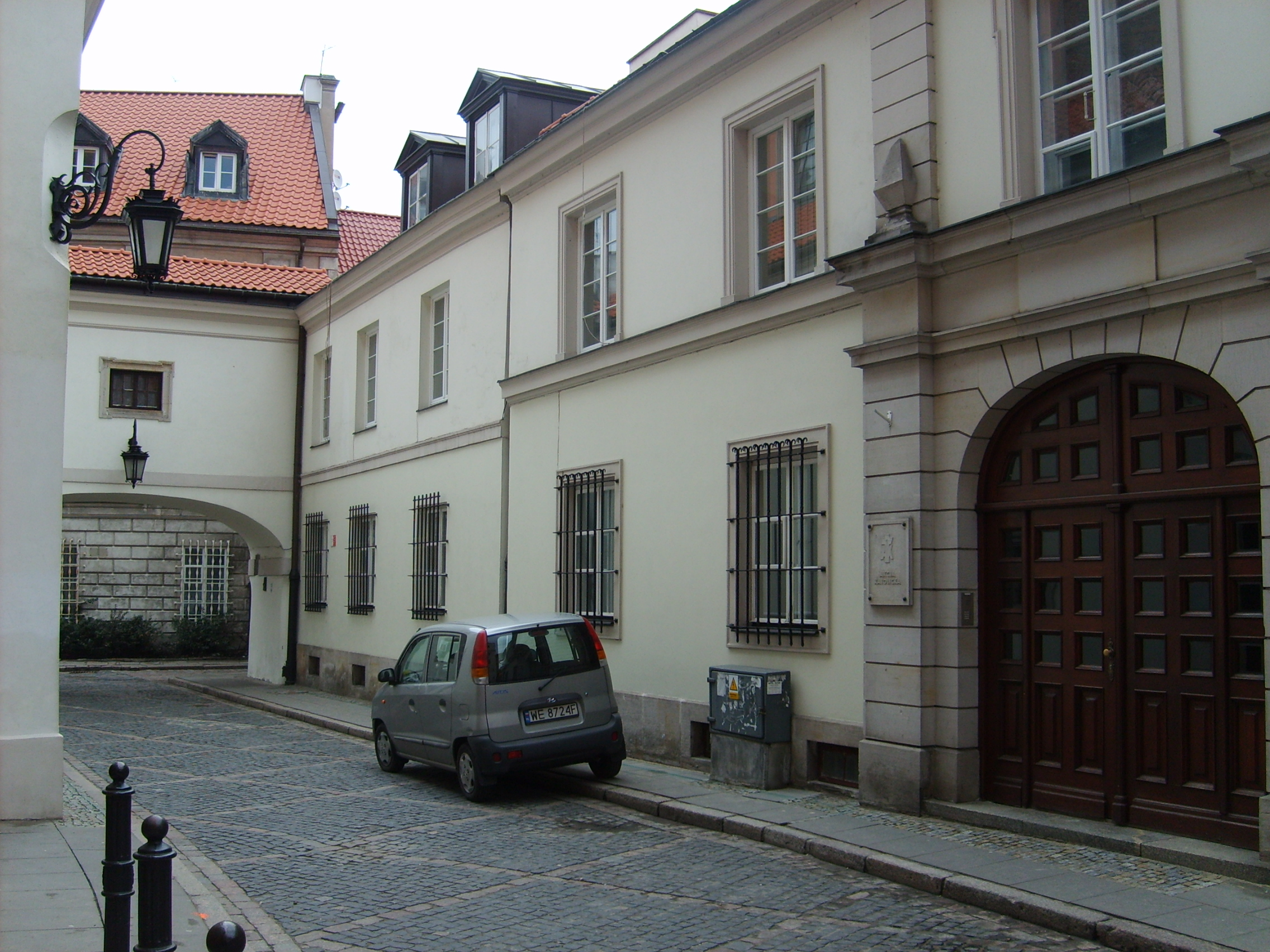
Façade of Dean's Palace

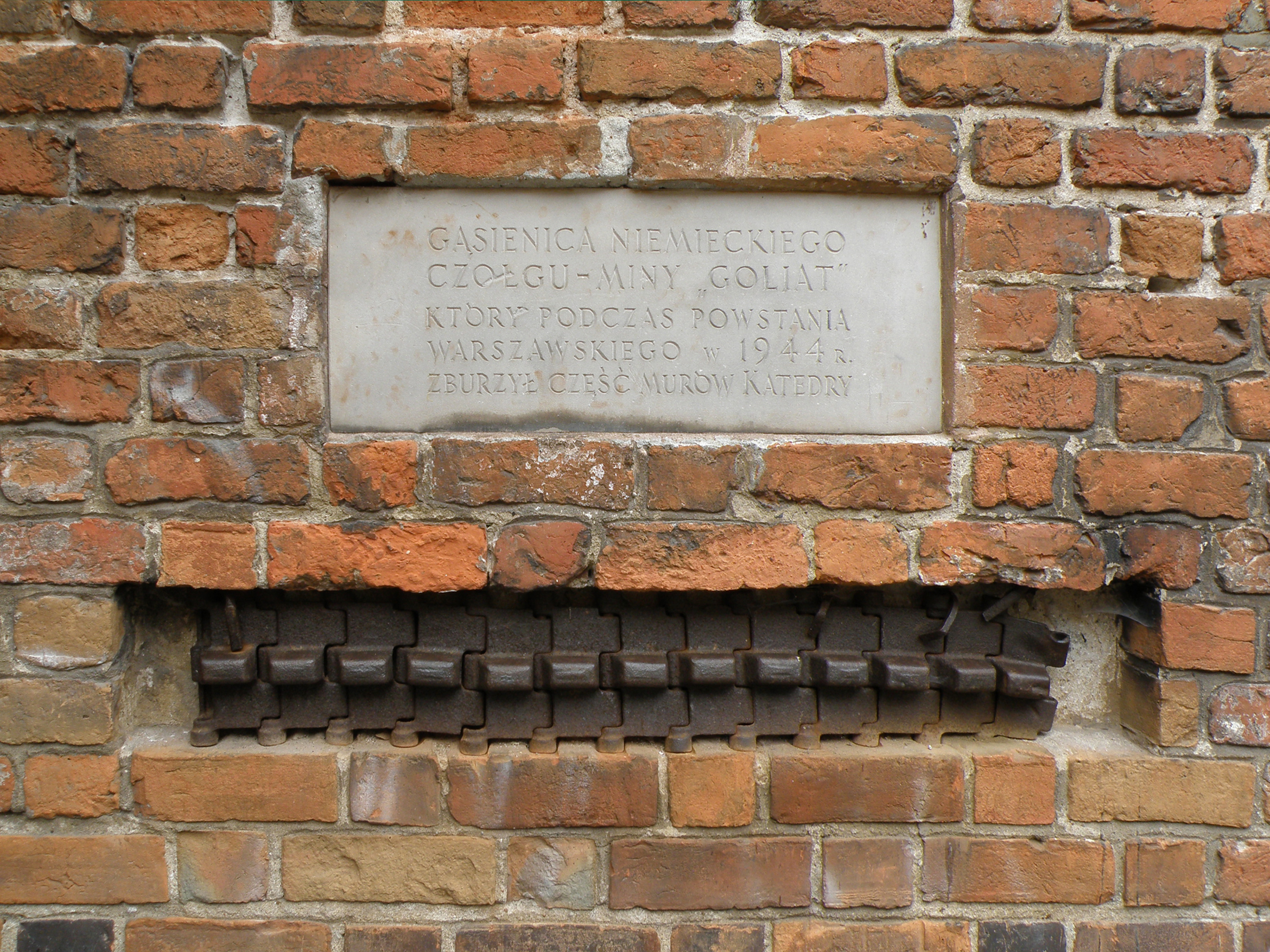
Plaque commemorating explosion of Goliath tracked mine
