= Janusz Edmund Zimniak =

Polish Roman Catholic prelate (1933–2024)

- Auxiliary Bishop Emeritus of Bielsko-Żywiec
- Metropolis: Kraków
- Appointed: 25 March 1992
- Term ended: 16 January 2010
- Other post: Titular Bishop of Polinianum (1980–2024)
- Previous post: Auxiliary Bishop of Katowice (1980–1992)

Orders
- Ordination: 9 September 1956 by Franciszek Sonik
- Consecration: 4 November 1980 by Herbert Bednorz

Personal details
- Born: 6 September 1933 Tychy, Poland
- Died: 24 May 2024 (aged 90) Bielsko-Biała, Poland
- Motto: Evangelizari et evangelizare
- Coat of arms

Styles of Janusz Edmund Zimniak
- Reference style: His Excellency; The Most Reverend
- Spoken style: Your Excellency
- Religious style: Bishop

Janusz Edmund Zimniak (6 September 1933 – 24 May 2024) was a Polish Roman Catholic prelate.

== Biography ==
Zimniak was born on 6 September 1933 in Tychy. In 1935 he moved with his family to Mysłowice. In the years 1945–1951 he studied at the local State Junior High School and Secondary School. In the years 1951–1956 he studied at the Higher Silesian Seminary in Kraków and at the Faculty of Theology of the Jagiellonian University. He was ordained a subdeacon and deacon through the ministry of bishop Franciszek Jop, capitular vicar of the archdiocese of Krakow. He was ordained a priest on 9 September 1956 in the Cathedral of Christ the King in Katowice by the auxiliary bishop of Kielce, Franciszek Sonik. In the years 1969–1972, he studied pastoral theology at the International Pastoral and Catechetical Institute "Lumen Vitae" in Brussels, which is a branch of the Catholic University of Louvain. He graduated with a bachelor's degree, had a master's degree in 1978 at the Faculty of Theology of the Catholic University of Lublin. He continued his specialized studies in the years 1977–1979 at the Institute of Pastoral Theology of the Theological Faculty of the Catholic University of Lublin, obtaining a doctorate in pastoral theology after submitting his dissertation Family Catechesis in the Works of Pierre Ranvez SI. He worked as a vicar in the locality in Jejkowice (1956–1957), in the parish of the Holy Trinity in Bielsko (1957–1961) and in the parish of St. Paul the Apostle in Pawłów (1961–1963). In the years 1963–1966 he was an independent pastor at the Drutarnia-Brusiek pastoral station and rector of the church of St. John the Baptist in Bruśko, and then for several months in 1966, vicar of the parish of St. Bartłomiej in Bieruń Stary. In the curia of the Katowice diocese he was a diocesan catechetical inspector in the years 1966–1969 and again in the years 1973–1977. From 1966, he also served as the diocesan youth pastor for men, and from 1973 to 1975, secretary of the First Synod of the Diocese of Katowice. In 1974, he became a catechetics consultant for the editorial office of "Gość Niedzielny". In 1975, he participated in the preparations of the Synod of the Krakow Province. In the 1970s, he led retreat days for catechists and teachers and retreats for high school graduates. He lectured on catechetics, pedagogy and developmental psychology at the Higher Silesian Seminary in Kraków and at a catechetical course in Katowice. In the years 1979–1980 he held the office of vice-rector of the Higher Silesian Theological Seminary in Kraków. On September 25, 1980, he was appointed auxiliary bishop of the Katowice diocese with the titular see of Polinianum. He was ordained a bishop on November 4, 1980, in the Cathedral of Christ the King in Katowice. They were given to him by the local diocesan bishop, Herbert Bednorz, who was assisted by local auxiliary bishops: Józef Kurpas and Czesław Domin. He adopted the words "Evangelizari et evangelizare" (To be evangelized and evangelize) as his episcopal motto. In the years 1980–1992 he held the office of vicar general of the diocese. In the bishop's curia, he supervised the departments of the Department of Christian Science, was a clerk of catechesis for secondary school youth, and belonged to the administrative council, the priestly council and the pastoral council. At the beginning of 1981, together with Bishop Bronisław Dąbrowski, secretary of the Polish Episcopate, and Bishop Czesław Domin, he mediated during the general strike of "Solidarity" in Podbeskidzie, and then was the guarantor of the concluded agreement. On March 25, 1992, he was transferred to the office of auxiliary bishop of the newly established Bielsko-Żywiec diocese. In the same year, he took up the office of vicar general of the diocese. He was the chairman of the organizing committee of the visit of John Paul II to the Bielsko-Żywiec diocese during his apostolic journey in 1995. On January 16, 2010, Pope Benedict XVI accepted his resignation from the duties of auxiliary bishop of Bielsko-Żywiec. Within the Polish Episcopate, he became a delegate for the pastoral care of addicted youth, became vice-chairman of the Catechetical Commission, and also became a member of the Commission for the Apostolate of the Laity and the Commission for Youth Pastoral Care. In 2008, he was awarded the Medal of the National Education Commission.

Zimniak died in Bielsko-Biała on 24 May 2024, at the age of 90.

Catholic Church titles
Preceded by —	Auxiliary Bishop of Katowice; 1980–1992	Succeeded by —
Preceded by —	Auxiliary Bishop of Bielsko-Żywiec; 1992–2010	Succeeded by —
Preceded by Joseph John Ruocco	Titular Bishop of Polinianum; 1980–2024	Succeeded by Vacant
