= Wiktor Skworc =

Polish Roman Catholic archbishop (born 1948)

Most Reverend Wiktor Paweł Skworc
- Archbishop Emeritus of Katowice
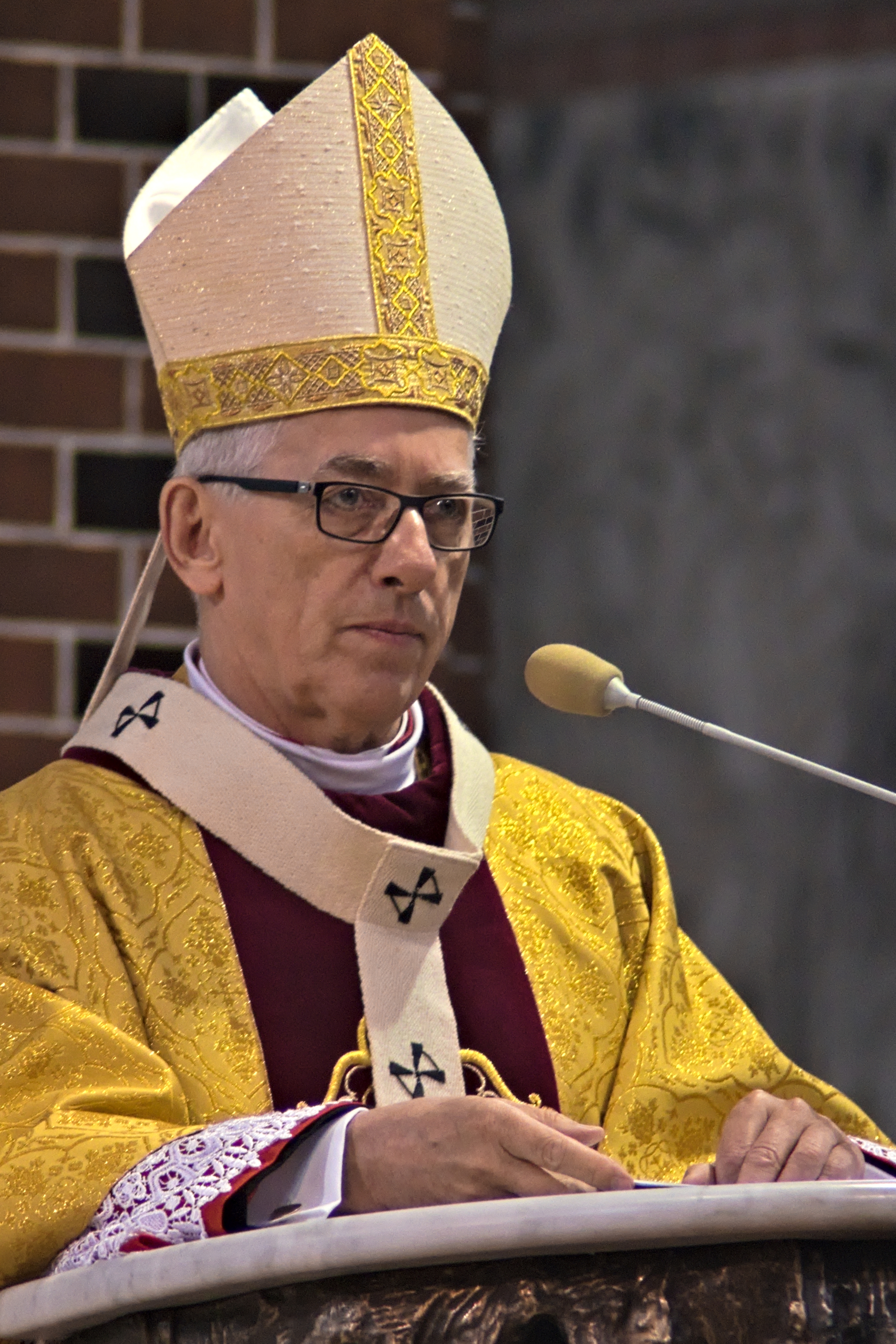
- Skworc in 2020
- Diocese: Katowice
- Installed: 29 October 2011
- Term ended: 31 May 2023
- Predecessor: Damian Zimoń
- Successor: Adrian Galbas
- Previous post: Bishop of Tarnów (1998–2011)

Orders
- Ordination: 27 March 1973 by Herbert Bednorz
- Consecration: 6 January 1998 by Pope John Paul II

Personal details
- Born: Wiktor Paweł Skworc; 19 May 1948 (age 78) Bielszowice, Poland
- Education: Major Theological Seminary in Kraków, Cardinal Stefan Wyszyński University in Warsaw
- Motto: W Duchu Świętym
- Coat of arms

Wiktor Paweł Skworc (born 19 May 1948) is a Polish Roman Catholc prelate, who served as Archbishop of the Archdiocese of Katowice from 2011 to 2023. He previously served as the Bishop of Tarnów from 1998 to 2011.

== Early life and ministry ==
Wiktor Skworc was born in Bielszowice (now part of Ruda Śląska). After graduating from high school in 1966, he entered the Major Seminary in Kraków. He was ordained a priest on 27 March 1973 by Bishop Herbert Bednorz.

In 1995, he obtained a doctorate in history from the Cardinal Stefan Wyszyński University in Warsaw. During his early ministry, he served as the chancellor of the curia in Katowice and was heavily involved in the construction of the Seminary in Katowice and the local theological faculty.

== Episcopal ministry ==
=== Bishop of Tarnów ===
On 13 December 1997, Pope John Paul II appointed him Bishop of Tarnów. He received his episcopal consecration on 6 January 1998 in St. Peter's Basilica from the Pope himself. During his tenure in Tarnów, he was known for his administrative efficiency and support for foreign missions.

=== Archbishop of Katowice ===
On 29 October 2011, Pope Benedict XVI appointed Skworc as the Metropolitan Archbishop of Katowice, succeeding Damian Zimoń. He was installed in the Cathedral of Christ the King on 26 November 2011.

=== Misconduct investigation and resignation ===
In 2021, Skworc became the subject of a Vatican investigation regarding his alleged negligence in handling cases of sexual abuse of minors by subordinate clergy during his time as Bishop of Tarnów. Specifically, he was accused of transferring a known predator priest to Ukraine without informing the local authorities there.

Following the investigation, Skworc requested the appointment of a coadjutor archbishop and resigned from his positions within the Polish Episcopal Conference. On 31 May 2023, Pope Francis accepted his resignation as Archbishop of Katowice upon reaching the age of 75.
