= Stanisław Adamski =

Polish bishop and politician (1875-1967)

- Bishop of Katowice
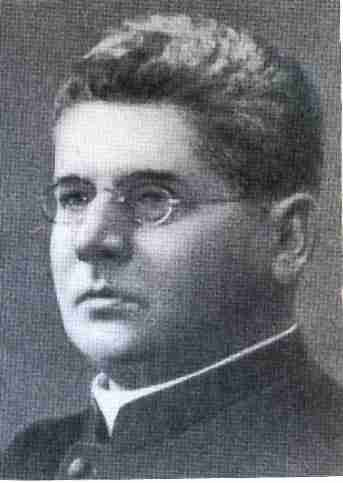
- Church: Catholic Church
- Diocese: Diocese of Katowice
- In office: 2 September 1930 – 12 November 1967
- Predecessor: Arkadiusz Lisiecki
- Successor: Herbert Bednorz

Orders
- Ordination: 12 November 1899
- Consecration: 26 October 1930 by August Hlond

Personal details
- Born: 12 April 1875 Grünberg, Province of Posen, Kingdom of Prussia, German Empire
- Died: 12 November 1967 (aged 92) Katowice, Katowice Voivodeship, Polish People's Republic

Stanisław Adamski (12 April 1875 – 12 November 1967) was a Polish bishop, politician, and social and political activist of the Union of Catholic Societies of Polish Workers (Związek Katolickich Towarzystw Robotników Polskich), founder and editor of the Robotnik (Worker) weekly.

Adamski was born in Zielonagóra. He was a Sejm deputy (1919–1922) and senator (1922–1927).

During World War II, Germans prevented him from carrying out his duties (1940–1945). Later, he was repressed by the communist government, removed from office in 1952, and upon being allowed in 1956, due to old age, delegated the responsibility to others. He died in Katowice.

== See also ==
- Cooperative banking in Poland

Preceded by Arkadiusz Lisiecki	Bishop of Katowice; 1926–1967	Succeeded by Herbert Bednorz
