= Piotr Libera =

Polish Catholic bishop (born 1951)

His Excellency Piotr Libera
- Bishop Emeritus of Płock
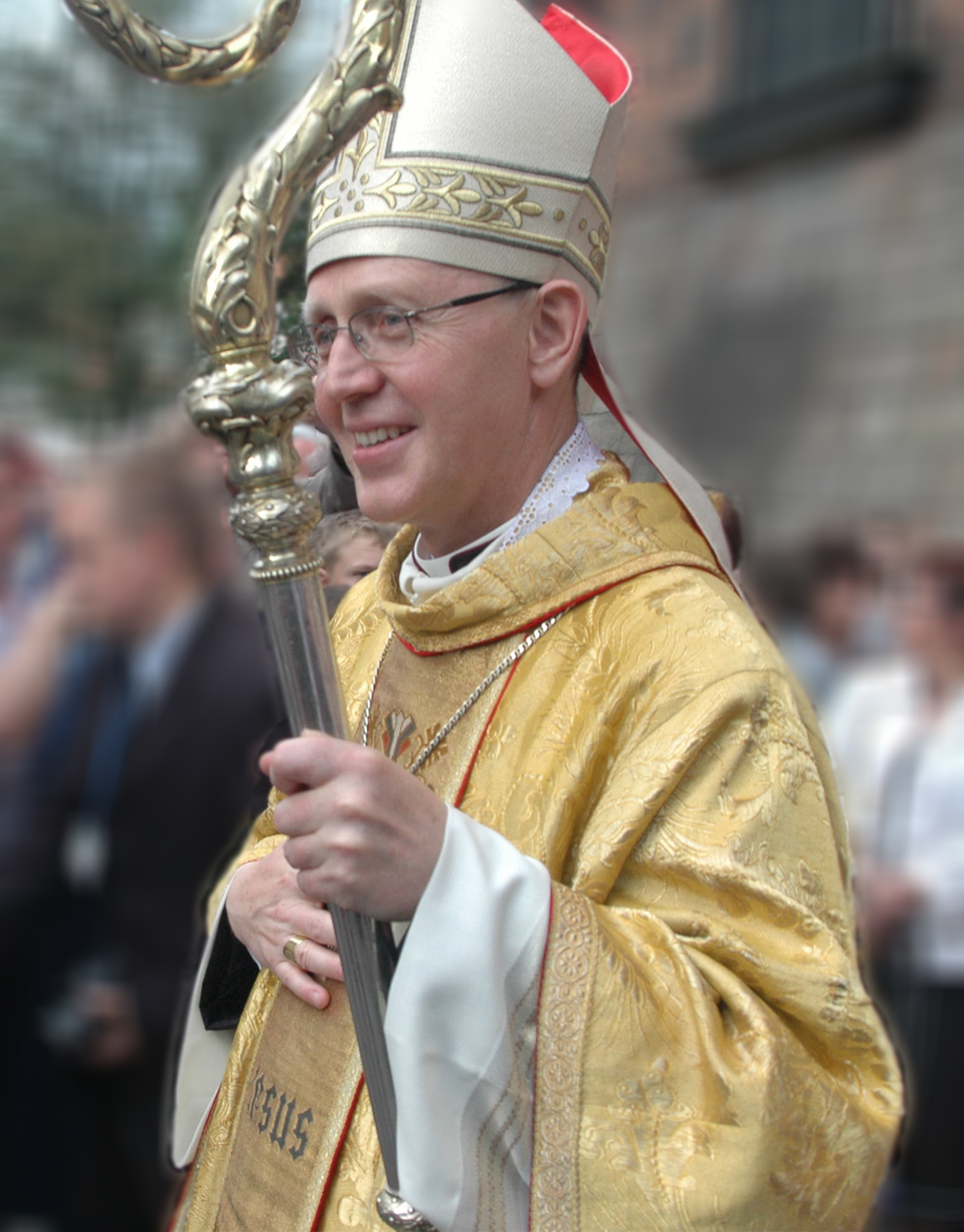
- Church: Catholic Church
- Diocese: Diocese of Płock
- Appointed: 2 May 2007
- Installed: 31 May 2007
- Term ended: 4 June 2022
- Predecessor: Stanisław Wielgus
- Previous post: Auxiliary Bishop of Katowice

Orders
- Ordination: 15 April 1976 by Herbert Bednorz
- Consecration: 6 January 1997 by Pope John Paul II

Personal details
- Born: 20 March 1951 (age 75) Szopienice, Poland
- Coat of arms

Piotr Libera (born 20 March 1951) is a Polish prelate of the Catholic Church who was Bishop of Płock from 2008 to 2022. He was an auxiliary bishop of Katowice from 1996 to 2007 and secretary general of the Polish Episcopal Conference from 1998 to 2007.

== Biography ==
Piotr Libera was born on 20 March 1951 in Szopienice. After completing high school, he entered the seminary in 1969. From 1970 to 1972 he performed his compulsory military service in Bartoszyce. He was ordained a priest on 15 April 1976 by Herbert Bednorz, Bishop of Katowice.

He completed his theological and humanistic training at the Salesian-Latinitas Pontifical Athenaeum between 1980 and 1986, earning his doctorate with a thesis on Saint Ambrose. From 1986 to 1989 he was prefect of the Major Seminary of Katowice. From 1989 to 1996 he worked at the Apostolic Nunciature in Warsaw.

On 23 November 1996, Pope John Paul II named him titular bishop of Centuria and auxiliary bishop of Katowice. He received his episcopal consecration on 6 January 1997 from Pope John Paul.

From 1998 to 2007 he was secretary general of the Polish Episcopal Conference.

On 2 May 2007, Pope Benedict XVI appointed him bishop of Płock. He was installed there on 31 May 2007 in Masovian Blessed Virgin Mary Cathedral.

In 2009, he excommunicated a journalist who had attempted to make a tape recording of his confession to help support his denunciation of corruption in the clergy.

Pope Francis accepted his resignation as bishop of Płovk on 4 June 2022. Because of health problems, Libera submitted his resignation several years before he was required to.

Preceded by Stanisław Wielgus	Bishop of Płock; 2007–2022	Succeeded by vacant
