= Kazimierz Nycz =

Polish Roman Catholic cardinal (born 1950)

His Eminence Kazimierz Nycz
- Cardinal; Metropolitan Archbishop Emeritus of Warsaw
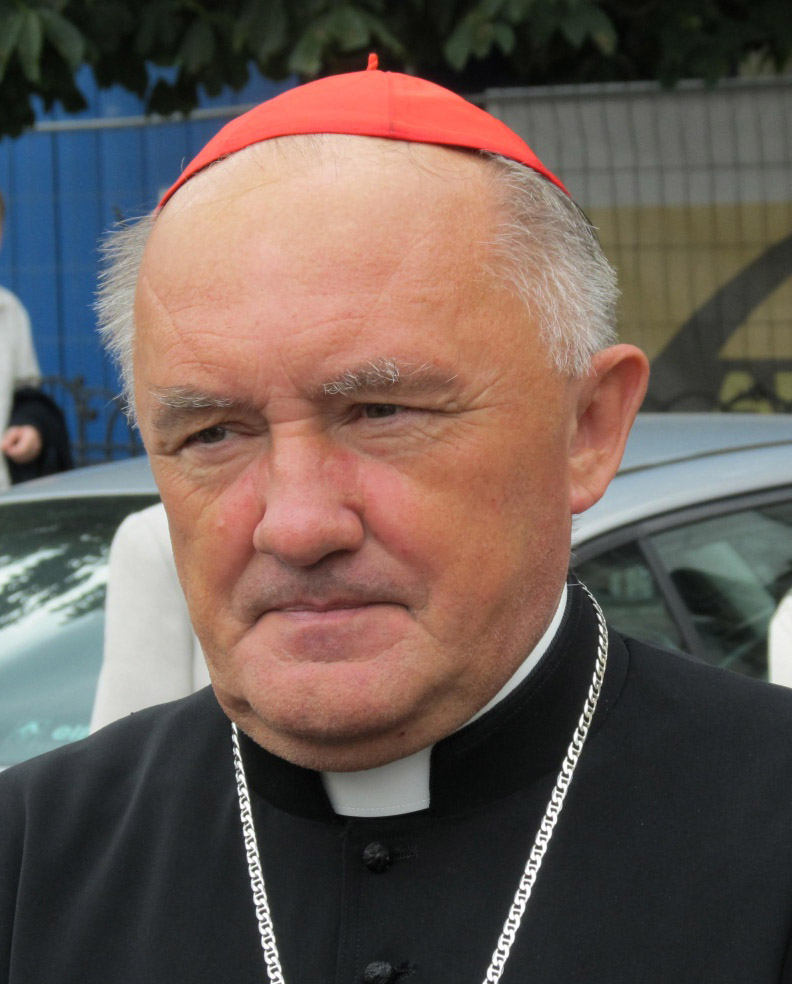
- Church: Catholic Church
- Archdiocese: Warsaw
- Metropolis: Warsaw
- Appointed: 3 March 2007
- Installed: 1 April 2007
- Term ended: 4 November 2024
- Predecessor: Stanisław Wielgus
- Successor: Adrian Joseph Galbas
- Other posts: Cardinal-Priest of Santi Silvestro e Martino ai Monti (2010-); Ordinary of The Polish Ordinariate of the Faithful of Eastern Rites
- Previous posts: Auxiliary Bishop of Kraków (1988–2004); Titular Bishop of Villa Regis (1988–2004); Bishop of Koszalin-Kołobrzeg (2004–2007)

Orders
- Ordination: 20 May 1973 by Julian Groblicki
- Consecration: 4 June 1988 by Franciszek Macharski
- Created cardinal: 20 November 2010 by Benedict XVI
- Rank: Cardinal-Priest

Personal details
- Born: 1 February 1950 (age 76) Stara Wieś, Poland
- Denomination: Catholic (Roman Rite)
- Education: Catholic University of Lublin
- Motto: Ex Hominibus, pro Hominibus ("From the people, for the people")
- Coat of arms

Styles of Kazimierz Nycz
- Reference style: His Eminence
- Spoken style: Your Eminence
- Informal style: Cardinal
- See: Warsaw

Kazimierz Nycz (Polish pronunciation: [kaˈʑi.mjɛʂ nɨt͡ʂ]; born 1 February 1950) is a Polish prelate of the Catholic Church who served as the Archbishop of Warsaw from 2007 to 2024. He was Bishop of Koszalin-Kołobrzeg from 2004 to 2007, after serving more than fifteen years as auxiliary bishop of Kraków. Pope Benedict XVI elevated him to the rank of cardinal in 2010.

== Biography ==
Kazimierz Nycz was born in Stara Wieś. Nycz was educated at the primary school in Stara Wieś; Lyceum of Maria Skłodowska-Curie, Czechowice-Dziedzice where he graduated in 1967; he then entered the Major Seminary of Kraków. He received the diaconate from Cardinal Karol Wojtyła on 8 May 1972, and was ordained to the priesthood on 20 May 1973 by Bishop Julian Groblicki.

In 1976, he obtained a bachelor's degree at the Faculty of Theology of Papieska Akademia Teologiczna (Pontifical Academy of Theology), of Kraków. In 1977 he started his doctoral studies at the Catholic University of Lublin, where he earned a doctorate in catechetical studies in 1981 with a dissertation "Implementation of catechetical renewal of the Second Vatican Council in the Archdiocese of Kraków".

From 1973 to 1975 he was vicar of the parish of Saint Elisabeth in Jaworzno, and he was vice-rector of the Major Seminary of Kraków from 1987 to 1988. On 14 May 1988, Nycz was appointed Auxiliary Bishop of Kraków and Titular Bishop of Villa Regis. He received his episcopal consecration on the following 4 June from Cardinal Franciszek Macharski, with Archbishops Jerzy Ablewicz and Stanisław Nowak as co-consecrators.

On 26 November 1999, he was named chairman of the Committee for Catholic Education; his main interest was to seek ways to find the opportunities offered by schools for catechetical activities and to search for forms of parish catechesis. As chairman of the Commission for Education of the Conference of the Polish Episcopate, the center of his activities was adapting the Polish catechesis to the post-Vatican II catechetical documents of the Church, especially the Catechism of the Catholic Church and the General Directory for Catechesis; and to correlate the teaching of religion in the school with the requirements of the reformed schools

He was appointed Bishop of Koszalin-Kołobrzeg on 9 June 2004. On 3 March 2007, Pope Benedict XVI named Nycz, who was then on a pilgrimage to the Holy Land, to succeed Stanisław Wielgus as Archbishop of Warsaw, after Wielgus had abruptly resigned on 7 January after admitting to he had collaborated with the Służba Bezpieczeństwa, the Communist secret police. That agency's records showed that Nycz had repeatedly refused to enter their service. His installation as Archbishop of Warsaw took place on 1 April 2007 at St. John's Cathedral. He was also named bishop to the Eastern Catholics in Poland on 9 June 2007.

He organized the last visit of Pope John Paul II to Poland.

He was created cardinal priest of Ss. Silvestro e Martino ai Monti on 20 November 2010.

On 29 December 2010 Nycz was appointed a member of the Congregation for Divine Worship and the Discipline of the Sacraments and the Congregation for the Clergy.

He was also a member of the committee to Support the POLIN Museum of the History of Polish Jews.

He was one of the cardinal electors who participated in the 2013 papal conclave that elected Pope Francis.

In October 2024, Nycz expressed openness to the legalisation of same-sex civil unions in Poland.

He was once again a cardinal elector in the 2025 papal conclave that elected Pope Leo XIV.

Nycz is the Grand Prior of the Polish Lieutenancy of the Equestrian Order of the Holy Sepulchre of Jerusalem.

Catholic Church titles
Preceded by Henryk Józef Muszyński	— TITULAR — Titular Bishop of Villa regis 14 May 1988 – 9 June 2004	Succeeded by Karlheinz Diez
Preceded by Marian Gołębiewski	Bishop of Koszalin–Kołobrzeg; 9 June 2004 – 3 March 2007	Succeeded by Edward Dajczak
Preceded by Stanisław Wojciech Wielgus	Archbishop of Warsaw; 3 March 2007 –	Incumbent
Preceded by Józef Glemp	Ordinary of Poland of the Eastern Rite; 9 June 2007 –	Incumbent
Preceded by Armand Gaétan Razafindratandra	Cardinal-Priest of Santi Silvestro e Martino ai Monti; 20 November 2010 –	Incumbent
