= Archdiocese of Katowice =

Roman Catholic archdiocese in Poland

Coordinates: 50°15′02″N 19°01′08″E

Metropolitan Archdiocese of Katowice Archidioecesis Metropolitae Katovicensis Archidiecezja Metropolita Katowicka

Catholic
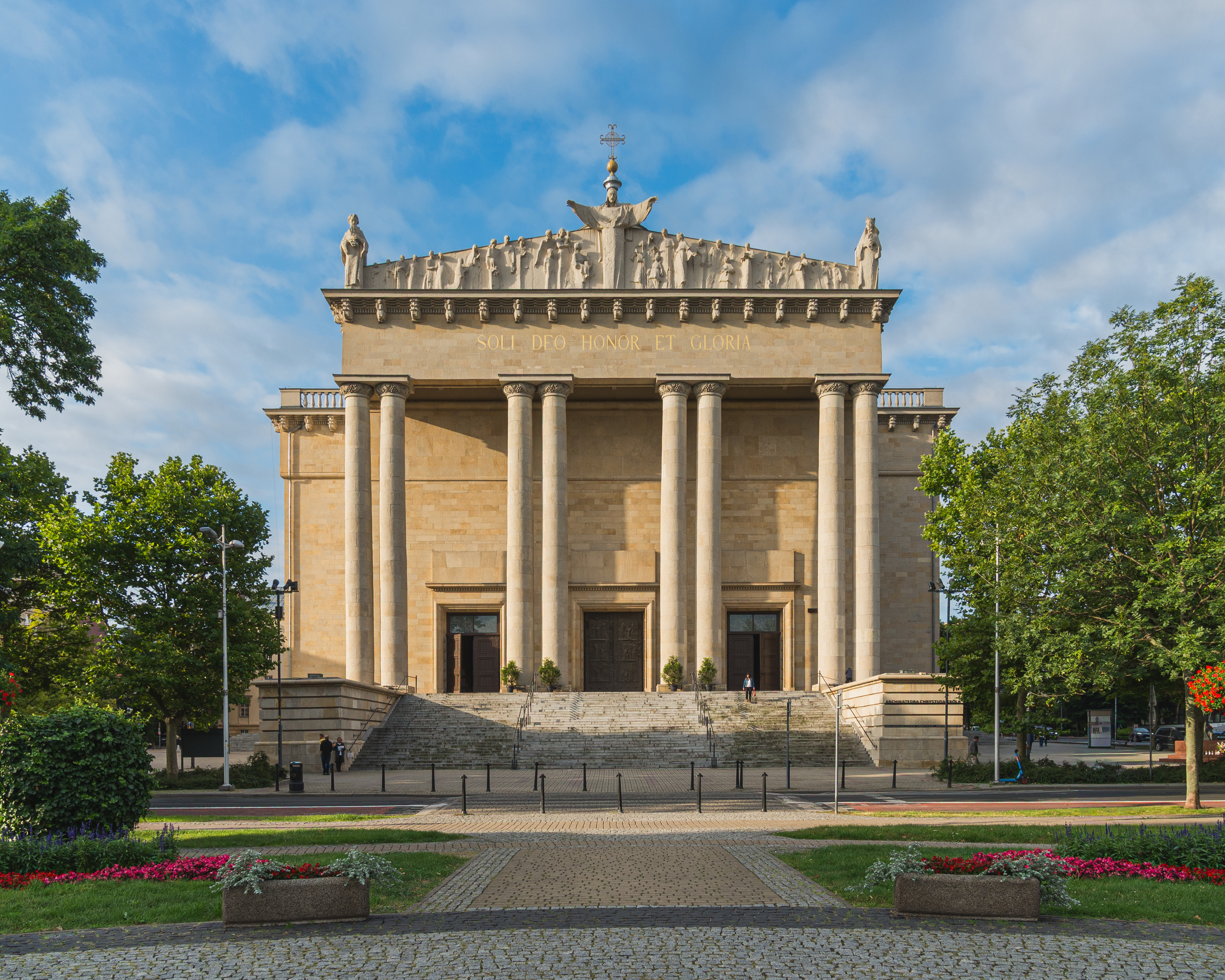
- Cathedral of Christ the King, Katowice

Location
- Country: Poland
- Ecclesiastical province: Katowice

Statistics
- Area: 2,400 km^{2} (930 sq mi)
- Population: Total; Catholics: (as of 2021); 1,461,000; 1,390,000 (95.1%)

Information
- Denomination: Catholic Church
- Rite: Latin Rite
- Cathedral: Cathedral of Christ the King, Katowice

Current leadership
- Pope: Leo XIV
- Metropolitan Archbishop: Andrzej Przybylski
- Auxiliary Bishops: Marek Szkudło; Adam Wodarczyk; Grzegorz Olszowski
- Bishops emeritus: Damian Zimoń; Wiktor Skworc

Website
- Website of the Archdiocese

The Metropolitan Archdiocese of Katowice (Latin: Archidioecesis Metropolitae Katovicensis) is a Latin metropolitan archdiocese of the Catholic Church, an ecclesiastical province in Western Poland.

== Special churches ==
Its cathedral archiepiscopal see is Archikatedra Chrystusa Króla, dedicated to Christ the King, in the city of Katowice, Śląskie.

It has several Minor basilicas :

- Bazylika św. Ludwika Króla i Wniebowzięcia Najświętszej Marii Panny, also in Katowice
- Bazylika Narodzenia Najświętszej Maryi Panny (Sanktuarium Matki Bożej Uśmiechniętej), in Pszów
- Bazylika NMP i św. Bartłomieja Apostoła (Sanktuarium Matki Sprawiedliwości i Miłości Społecznej), in Piekary Śląskie
- Bazylika św. Antoniego Padewskiego, in Rybnik.

== Province ==
Its ecclesiastical province comprises the Archdiocese and two suffragan bishoprics: the Roman Catholic Diocese of Gliwice and the Roman Catholic Diocese of Opole.

== History ==
On 7 November 1922, the Holy See disentangled the Roman Catholic parishes in the Polish Autonomous Silesian Voivodeship, territorially comprising the East of formerly Austrian Cieszyn Silesia (since 1918) and formerly German East Upper Silesia (since 1922) from the then Diocese of Breslau as a permanent Apostolic Administration of Upper Silesia on 17 December the same year.

- On 28 October 1925, Pope Pius XI elevated that apostolic administration and renamed it after its see to Diocese of Katowice, then as suffragan of the Metropolitan Archdiocese of Kraków, by the papal Bull Vixdum Poloniae Unitas.
- In 1947, it lost territory to establish the Apostolic Administration of Český Těšín.
- It enjoyed Papal visits from the Polish Pope John Paul II in June 1983 and June 1999.
- It was promoted on 25 March 1992, as Metropolitan Archdiocese of Katowice.

== Statistics ==
As of 2023, it pastorally served 1,375,000 Catholics (94.8% of 1,450,000 total) on 2,400 km^{2} in 322 parishes and 6 missions with 1,033 priests (913 diocesan, 120 religious), 12 deacons, 807 lay religious (187 brothers, 620 sisters) and 49 seminarians.

== Episcopal ordinaries ==
Apostolic Administrator of Upper Silesia

- August Hlond, S.D.B. (1922.11.07 – see promotion 1925.10.28 see below)

Suffragan Bishops of Katowice

- August Hlond, S.D.B. (1925.12.14 – 1926.06.24), appointed Archbishop of Gniezno–Poznan
- Arkadiusz Lisiecki (1926.06.24 – death 1930.05.13)
- Stanisław Adamski (1930.09.02 – death 1967.11.12)
  - Auxiliary Bishop: Teofil Bromboszcz (1934.03.24 – death 1937.01.12), Titular Bishop of Candyba
  - Auxiliary Bishop: Juliusz Bieniek (1937.03.13 – death 1978.01.17), Titular Bishop of Dascylium
  - Auxiliary Bishop: Józef Kurpas (1962.11.23 – 1991.06.22), retired, Titular Bishop of Orisa
- Herbert Bednorz (1967.11.12 – 1985.06.03), retired
  - Auxiliary Bishop: Czesław Domin (1970.06.06 – 1992.02.01), appointed Bishop of Koszalin–Kołobrzeg
  - Auxiliary Bishop: Janusz Edmund Zimniak (1980.09.25 – 1992.03.25), appointed Auxiliary Bishop of Bielsko–Żywiec
- Damian Zimoń (1985.06.03 – see promotion 1992.03.25 see below)
  - Auxiliary Bishop: Gerard Bernacki (1988.03.18 – 2012.01.31), resigned, Titular Bishop of Oppidum Consillinum

Metropolitan Archbishops of Katowice

- Damian Zimoń (see above 1992.03.25 – 2011.10.29), retired
  - Auxiliary Bishop: Piotr Libera (1996.11.23 – 2007.05.02), appointed Bishop of Płock
  - Auxiliary Bishop: Stefan Cichy (1998.08.26 – 2005.03.19), appointed Bishop of Legnica
  - Auxiliary Bishop: Józef Kupny (2005.12.21 – 2013.05.18), appointed Archbishop of Wrocław
- Wiktor Skworc (2011.10.29 – 2023.05.31), retired
  - Auxiliary Bishop: Marek Szkudło (2014.12.13 – ...), Titular Bishop of Wigry
  - Auxiliary Bishop: Adam Wodarczyk (2014.12.13 – ...), Titular Bishop of Pomezania
  - Auxiliary Bishop: Grzegorz Olszowski (2018.06.13 – ...), Titular Bishop of Rhoga
- Adrian Galbas (2023.05.31 – 2024.11.04), appointed Archbishop of Warsaw
- Andrzej Przybylski (2025.08.29 – ...)

== See also ==
- List of bishops of Katowice
- List of Catholic dioceses in Poland
- Roman Catholicism in Poland
