= Zielonagóra =

- Village
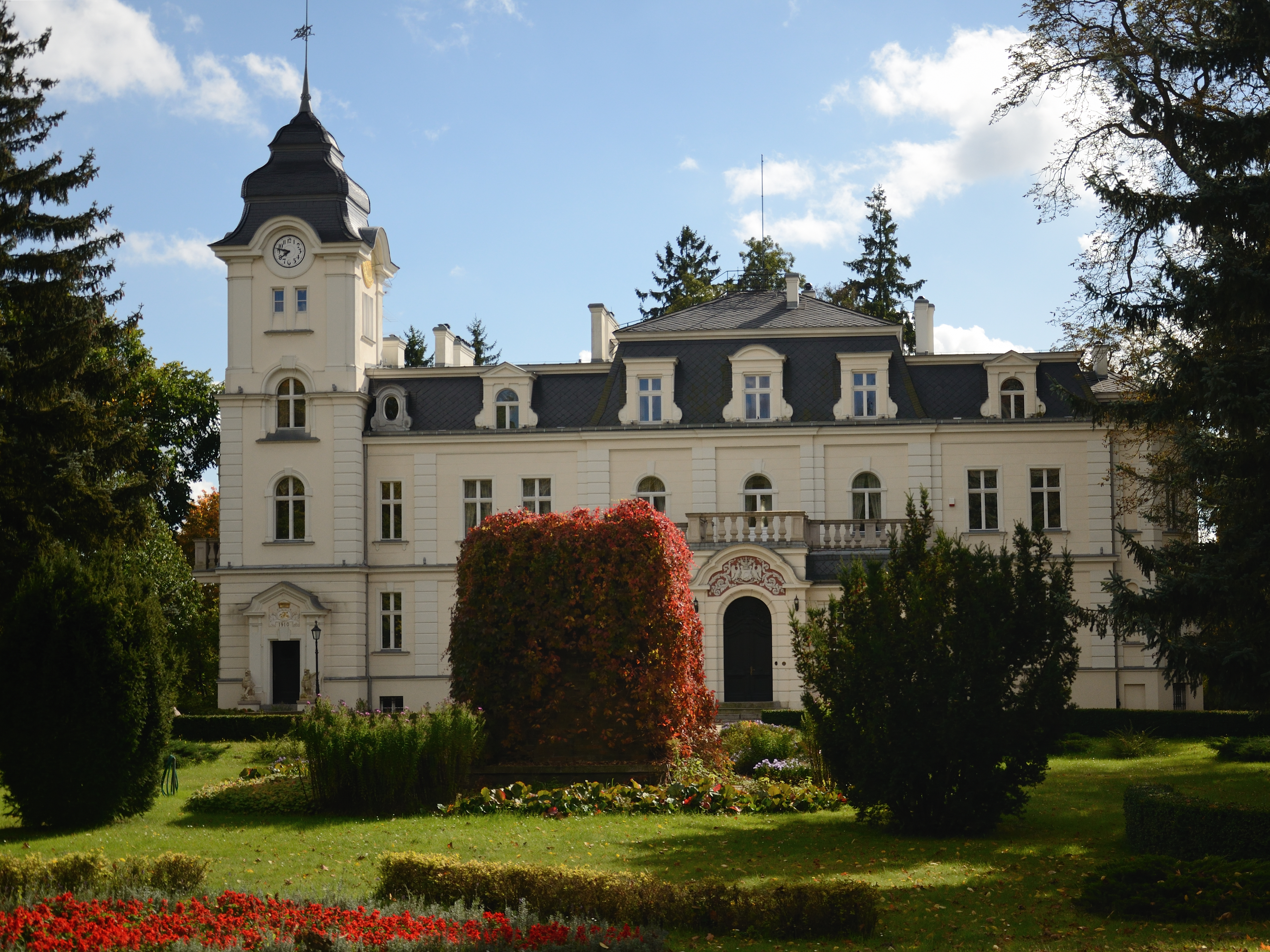
- Palace in Zielonagóra

- Location within Poland
- Coordinates: 52°42′N 16°31′E
- Country: Poland
- Voivodeship: Greater Poland
- County: Szamotuły
- Gmina: Obrzycko

Zielonagóra (Polish: [ʑɛˌlɔnaˈɡura]; lit. 'Green Mountain') is a village in the administrative district of Gmina Obrzycko, within Szamotuły County, Greater Poland Voivodeship, in west-central Poland.
