= Gerard Bernacki =

Polish Roman Catholic bishop (1942–2018)

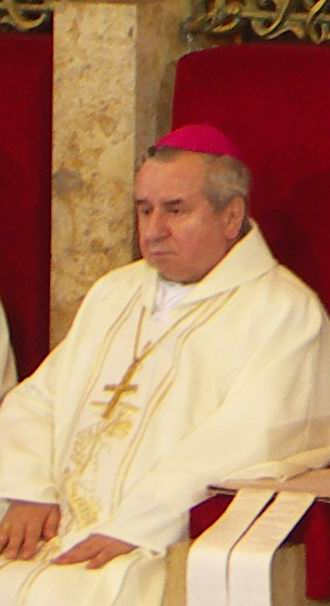
Bishop Gerard Bernacki in 2006

Gerard Bernacki (3 November 1942 – 21 December 2018) was a Polish Roman Catholic bishop.

Bernacki was born in Poland and was ordained to the priesthood in 1967. He served as titular bishop of Sala Consilina and as auxiliary bishop of the Roman Catholic Archdiocese of Katowice, Poland, from 1988 to 2012.

Bernacki died on 21 December 2018 in Prudnik at the age of 76. He was buried in Katowice.
