= Adrian Galbas =

Polish Roman Catholic archbishop (born 1968)

His Grace The Most Reverend Monsignor Adrian Józef Galbas S.A.C.
- Metropolitan Archbishop of Warsaw
- Church: Roman Catholic Church
- Archdiocese: Warsaw
- Province: Warsaw
- Appointed: 4 November 2024
- Installed: 14 December 2024
- Predecessor: Kazimierz Nycz
- Other post: Ordinary of the Ordinariate for Eastern Catholics in Poland (2025 – present)
- Previous posts: Auxiliary bishop of Ełk (2019–2021); Coadjutor archbishop of Katowice (2021–2023); Metropolitan archbishop of Katowice (2023–2024)

Orders
- Ordination: 7 May 1994 by Józef Kowalczyk
- Consecration: 11 January 2020 by Jerzy Mazur

Personal details
- Born: Adrian Józef Galbas; 26 January 1968 (age 58) Bytom, Poland
- Denomination: Roman Catholic
- Education: John Paul II Catholic University of Lublin; Cardinal Stefan Wyszyński University in Warsaw
- Motto: PAX CHRISTI
- Coat of arms

Adrian Józef Galbas, S.A.C. (born 26 January 1968) is a Polish prelate of the Catholic Church who has been Metropolitan Archbishop of Warsaw since December 2024. He became Archbishop of Katowice in May 2023, after sixteen months as coadjutor there. He was auxiliary bishop of Ełk from 2020 to 2021. He is a professed member of the Pallottines (Society of the Catholic Apostolate).

== Biography ==
Adrian Józef Galbas was born in Bytom on 26 January 1968. He joined the Pallottines in 1987. After spending the year 1987–88 in the novitiate in Ząbkowice Śląskie, he studied at that order's major seminary in Ołtarzew and took his final vows on 10 September 1993 in Zakopane. He was ordained a priest of that order on 7 May 1994 in Ołtarzew by Józef Kowalczyk, Archbishop of Gniezno.

His priestly career combined pastoral assignments, leadership roles for the Pallottines, and advanced studies. He was vicar of the parish of Saint Michael the Archangel in Łódź in 1994–95; studied for three years at the Catholic University of Lublin, earning a licentiate in pastoral theology in 1998; was prefect of discipline at the Pallottine major seminary in Ołtarzew from 1998 to 2002; provincial counselor in Poznań from 2002 to 2005; and priest of Saint Lawrence parish in Poznań from 2003 to 2011. After years of study he was awarded a doctorate in spiritual theology from the Cardinal Stefan Wyszyński University in Warsaw in 2012. From 2011 to 2019 he was the Pallottines' provincial for Poznań.

On 12 December 2019, Pope Francis named him auxiliary bishop of Ełk and titular bishop of Naissus. He received his episcopal consecration on 11 January 2020 from Jerzy Mazur, Bishop of Elk.

On 4 December 2021, Pope Francis named him Archbishop Coadjutor of Katowice.

On 31 May 2023, he succeeded as Archbishop of Katowice when Pope Francis accepted the resignation of Archbishop Wiktor Skworc. He was installed there on 17 June. He led Poland's preparation for the Bishops' Synod on Synodality and was one of three bishops representing Poland when it met in November 2023. Church observer Tomasz Krzyžak wrote that only Galbas returned from Rome speaking the pope's language of synodality without hesitation.

In October 2023, following the abrupt removal of Bishop Grzegorz Kaszak from the Diocese of Sosnowiec, Galbas was named apostolic administrator of that diocese.

Speaking to participants in a women's pilgrimage in the autumn of 2023, he described his own experience of crises of faith. He said that "The God I met in childhood was very categorical, you had to earn your place in Him. When I was growing up, this faith was not able to keep me in the Church." He said he had to find his way independently and concluded: "The enemy of faith is religious fundamentalism, which believes it knows the answers to all questions, for which ideology is God, and which is an equal threat to believers and non-believers."

On 4 November 2024, Pope Francis transferred him to the Metropolitan Archdiocese of Warsaw. Krzyžak described his appointment as part of Pope Francis' program for qualitative change in the leadership of the Church in Poland, but thought his reassignment after such a short time in Katowice demonstrated the lack of available pastoral talent. Another journalist expressed "surprise and relief" at Galbas' selection, believing other candidates too "conservative and clerical" to communicate with Warsaw's secular culture and judging Galbas the exponent of "liberalism that includes respect for those who think differently, humility, and lack of pomposity". Until his installation in Warsaw, Galbas was the apostolic administrator of Katowice. He was installed in Warsaw on 14 December 2024.

On 8 March 2025, Galbas was appointed ordinary for the Ordinariate for Eastern Catholics in Poland.

Within the Polish Episcopal Conference (KEP) he chairs the Council for the Lay Apostolate. He is a member of the Permanent Council of the KEP, a member of its team for the Pastoral Care of Polish Emigration, a delegate for the Apostolate of the Sick, and a delegate for the Schoenstatt Movement in Poland.
