= Archdiocese of Warsaw =

Roman Catholic archdiocese in Poland

Coordinates: 51°13′56″N 21°00′30″E

Metropolitan Archdiocese of Warsaw Archidioecesis Metropolitae Varsaviensis Archidiecezja Metropolita Warszawska

Catholic
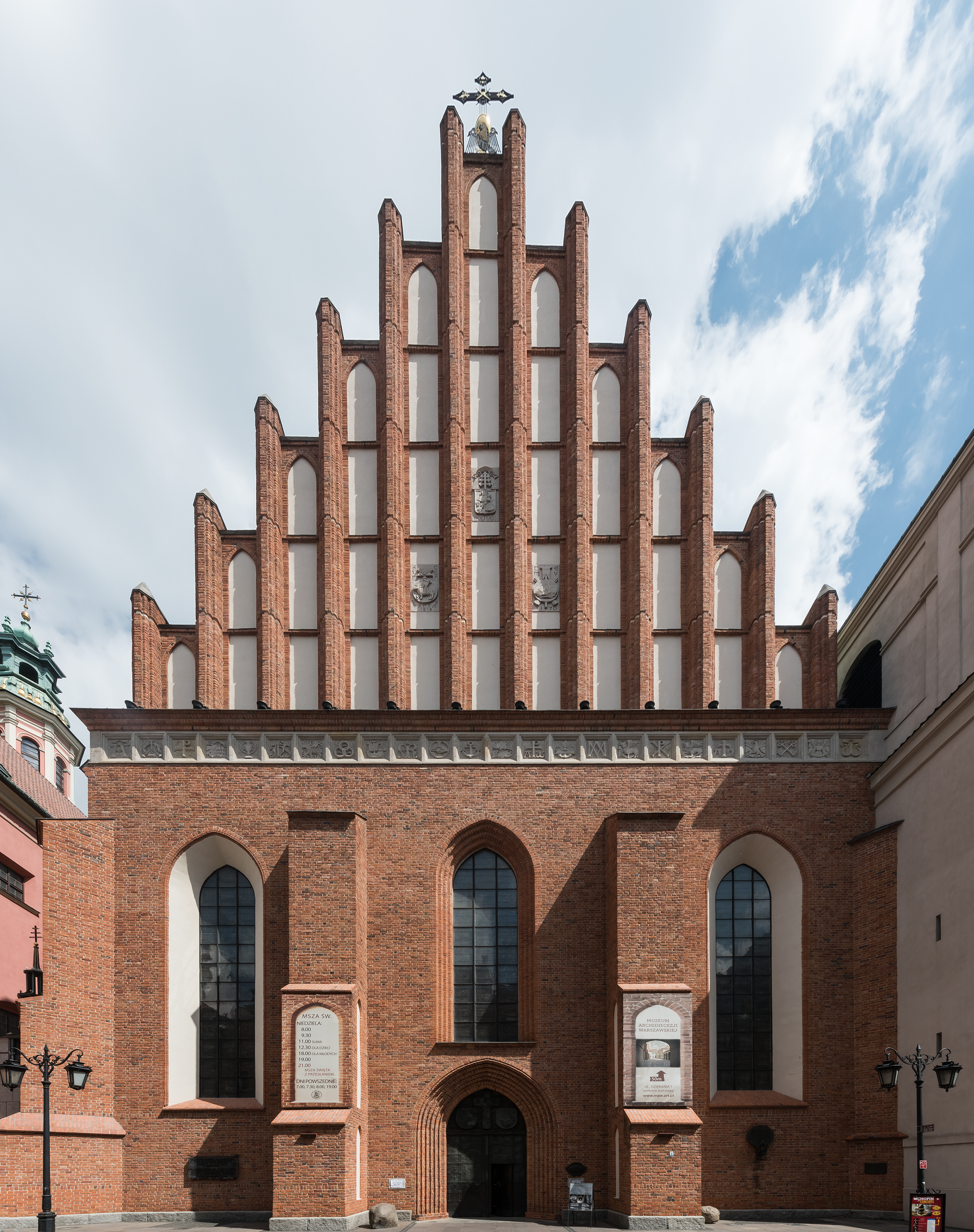
- St. John's Cathedral after the post-war reconstruction

Location
- Country: Poland

Statistics
- Area: 3,350 km^{2} (1,290 sq mi)
- Population: Total; Catholics: (as of 2020); 1,558,000; 1,467,000 (94,2%)
- Parishes: 210

Information
- Denomination: Roman Catholic
- Rite: Latin Rite (or Roman Rite)
- Established: 16 October 1798 (as Diocese of Warszawa); 30 June 1818 (Archdiocese of Warsaw)
- Cathedral: St. John's Cathedral, Warsaw

Current leadership
- Pope: Leo XIV
- Archbishop: Adrian Galbas
- Auxiliary Bishops: Piotr Jarecki; Rafał Markowski; Michał Janocha
- Bishops emeritus: Kazimierz Nycz

Website
- Website of the Archdiocese

The Metropolitan Archdiocese of Warsaw (Latin: Archidioecesis Metropolitae Varsaviensis, Polish: Archidiecezja Metropolita Warszawska) is a Latin Church ecclesiastical territory or diocese of the Catholic Church in Poland encompassing the Polish capital. It was erected on October 16, 1798 and was elevated to an Archdiocese on June 30, 1818.

A metropolitan see, its suffragan dioceses are the Roman Catholic Diocese of Płock and the Roman Catholic Diocese of Warszawa-Praga. According to the archdiocese's statistics, 30.4% of its population attended a church weekly in 2013. That is higher than a year earlier (29.8%) but church attendance may still be declining.

== Metropolitan Archbishop of Warsaw ==
The current archbishop, Adrian Galbas, appointed on 4 November 2024, formerly Archbishop of Katowice from 2023. He succeeded Kazimierz Nycz and installed on 14 December 2024.

See List of bishops and archbishops of Warsaw for all ordinarily of this diocese, as well as auxiliary bishops.

== See also ==
- List of bishops and archbishops of Warsaw
