= Damian Zimoń =

Polish Roman Catholic prelate (1940–2012)

- Archbishop Emeritus of Katowice
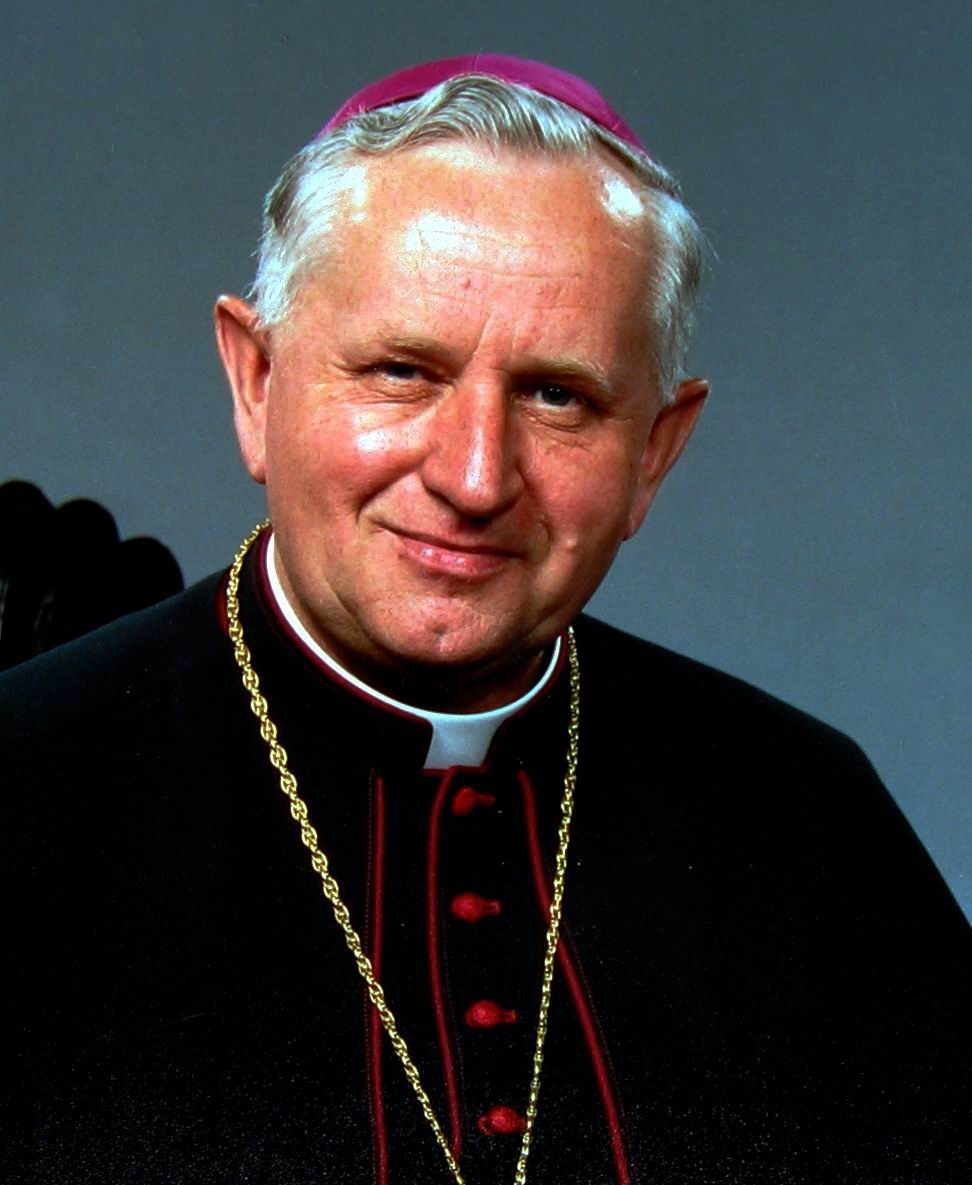
- Appointed: 3 June 1985
- Term ended: 29 October 2011
- Other post: Bishop of Katowice (1985-2011)

Orders
- Ordination: 21 December 1957 by Juliusz Bieniek
- Consecration: 29 June 1985 by Józef Glemp

Personal details
- Born: 25 October 1934 (age 91) Niedobczyce, Second Polish Republic
- Motto: Praedicamus Christum Crucifixum; (We proclaim Christ Crucified)

- Coat of arms

Damian Zimoń (born 25 October 1934) is metropolitan archbishop emeritus of the Roman Catholic Archdiocese of Katowice.

He was born in Niedobczyce, now a district of Rybnik. In 1992 the rank of bishop of Katowice was upgraded to that of an archbishop, as the diocese became an archdiocese, and Zimoń became the first Archbishop of Katowice.

| Preceded by Herbert Bednorz | Bishop of Katowice; 1985–2011 | Succeeded by Wiktor Skworc (as Archbishop of Katowice) |
