= Herbert Bednorz =

Bishop of Katowice from 1967 to 1985

- Bishop of Katowice
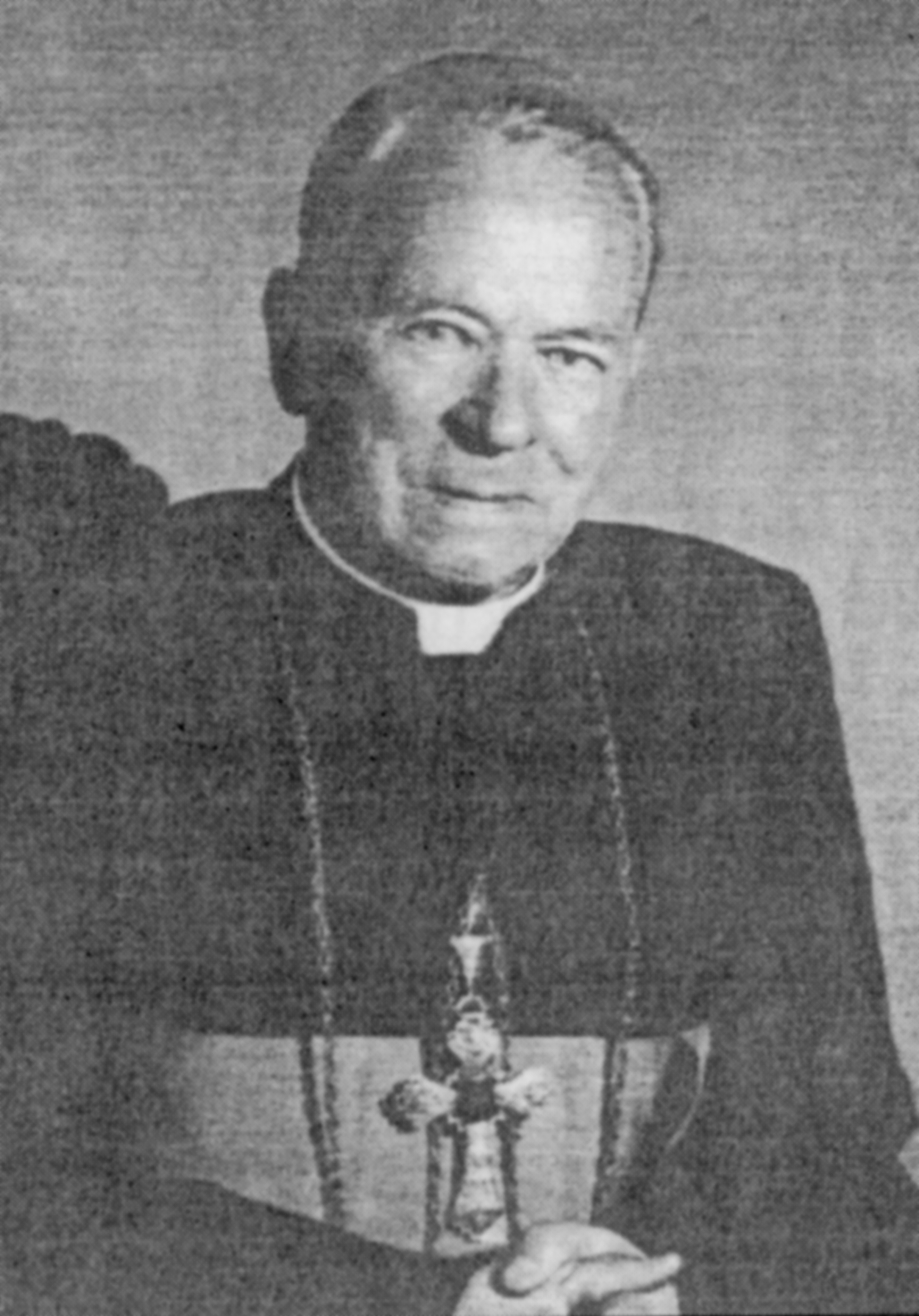
- Church: Catholic Church
- Diocese: Diocese of Katowice
- In office: 12 November 1967 – 3 June 1985
- Predecessor: Stanisław Adamski
- Successor: Damian Zimoń
- Previous posts: Titular Bishop of Bulla Regia (1950-1967); Coadjutor Bishop of Katowice (1950-1967)

Orders
- Ordination: 2 June 1932 by Stanisław Adamski
- Consecration: 24 December 1950 by Stanisław Adamski

Personal details
- Born: 22 September 1908 Gleiwitz, Province of Silesia, Kingdom of Prussia, German Empire
- Died: 12 April 1989 (aged 80) Katowice, Katowice Voivodeship, Polish People's Republic

Herbert Bednorz (22 September 1908 in Gliwice – 12 April 1989 in Katowice) was born in Gliwice to a working-class family. He is a Polish Catholic priest, theologist, and a Coadjutor bishop (from 1950) and later, from 1967, bishop of Roman Catholic Diocese of Katowice until 1985. During his tenure, he prioritized pastoral care for workers, often engaging directly with them and organizing pilgrimages to the Bakery Sanctuary. Through speeches, he advocated for workers' rights, including the importance of Sundays off, earning him the nickname "worker's bishop." Despite facing persecution from communist authorities and a five-year banishment from his diocese, he remained strong in his advocacy. Known for his dedication to those in need, Bednorz provided significant support throughout his life, exemplifying Catholic social teaching and courageously defending the rights of miners, workers, and all individuals. Bishop Herbert Bednorz was commemorated in the bishops' hall.

Preceded by Stanisław Adamski	Bishop of Katowice; 1967–1985	Succeeded by Damian Zimoń
