= Matylda Coal Mine =

Coal mine in Świętochłowice, Poland

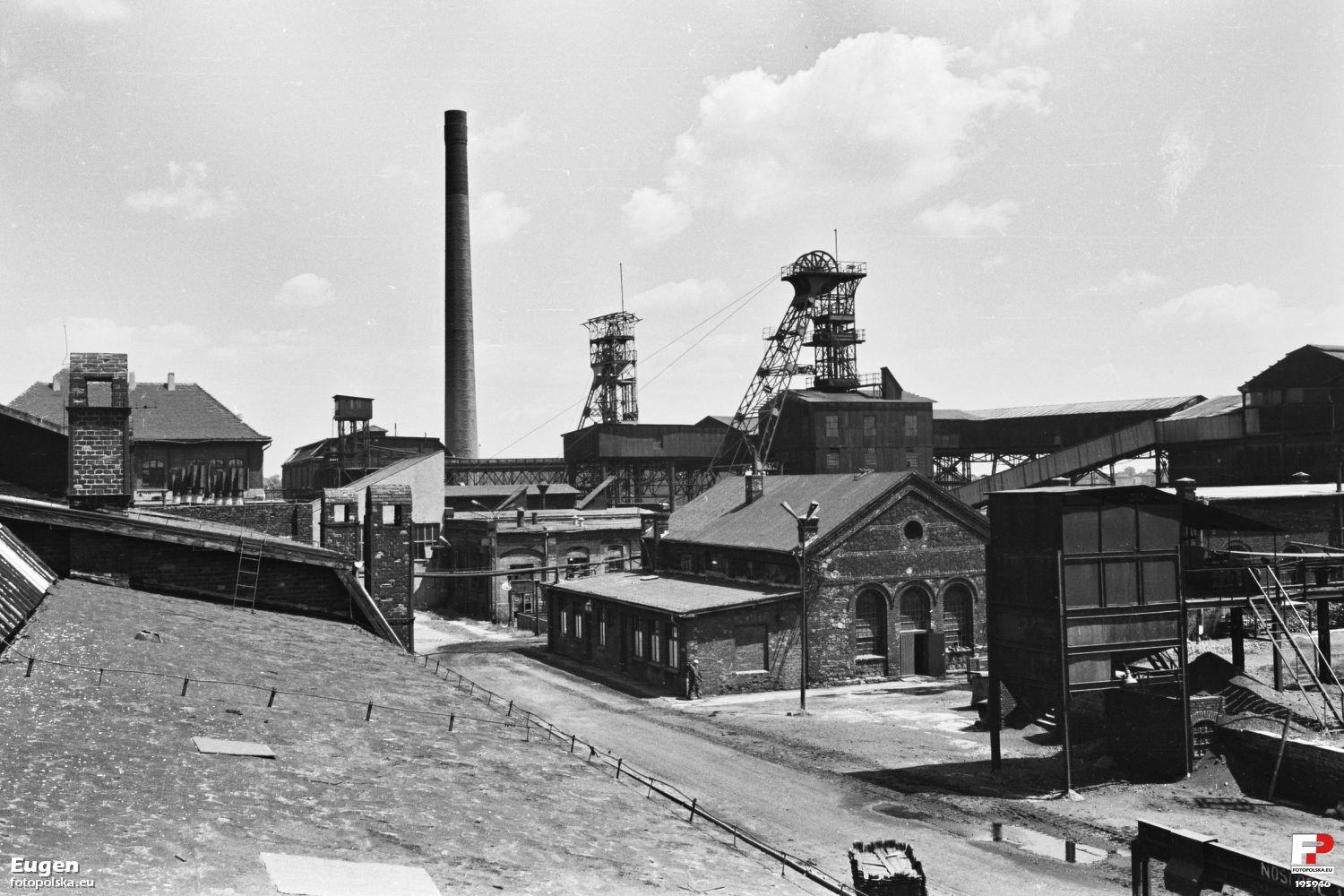
- Matylda Coal Mine in the 1976.
- Interactive map of Matylda Coal Mine
- Location: Świętochłowice (Lipiny), Silesian Voivodeship, Poland
- Products: black coal
- Production: 803,000 tons (1913); 538,000 tons (1965)
- Opened: 1827
- Closed: 1967; (Note: Merged with the Śląsk Coal Mine in Chropaczów, Świętochłowice.) 1977
- Company: Schlesische AG für Bergbau und Zinkhüttenbetrieb; Śląskie Kopalnie i Cynkownie S.A.; Chorzów ZPW; Katowice ZPW

The Matylda Coal Mine (Polish: Kopalnia Węgla Kamiennego Matylda; KWK Matylda) is a liquidated coal mine in the Lipiny district of Świętochłowice, Poland. The mine operated for around 160 years until its ultimate liquidation in 1977.

== History ==
=== Establishment ===
In 1823, Józef Porębski, (Note: Alternatively spelled Poręmbski or Porembski.) the owner of Schwientochlowitz estate, decided to expand his wealth to include a mining field in Lipine, naming his first mining site after his wife—Mathilda. Mining grants were awarded on January 13 and 30, 1827. That same year, Carl Lazarus Henckel von Donnersmarck bought 119 mining shares (Polish: kuks) from Porębski, establishing the Mathilda East mine. The remaining three shares were bought off by Karl Godulla in 1838. Exploitation at the mine began in 1853.

In 1857 the mining and smelting company Schlesische AG für Bergbau und Zinkhüttenbetrieb (colloquially known as Schlesag) bought Donnersmarck's shares; by 1874 it owned all shares. The company acquired Mathilda, alongside numerous other small coal mines, in order to secure an energy source for its operations. It was decided to expand the mine's exploitation in order to access coal deposits; by 1869 its shafts reached 240 metres. Concurrently, the Mathilda West mine was established in the years 1860–64.

=== Consolidation and Expansion ===
On 20 November 1875 Schlesag consolidated Mathilda with six mining fields in Lipine and Schwientochlowitz: Franz, König, Saul, Merkur, Paris, and Quintoforo. Subsequently, the mine came under the name Vereinigte Mathilda and totalled an area of 3,5 km^{2}, divided between two exploitation fields: West and East, on which coal was extracted at depths of 250 metres. Furthermore, the mine exploited leased fields from the neighbouring Schlesien (Later KWK Śląsk) and Paulus-Hohenzollern (later KWK Paweł and KWK Szombierki) coal mines. In 1913, the Mathilde Coal Mine produced 830 thousand tons of coal.

With the division of the region following the Silesian Plebiscite, the mine came under the ownership of the Katowice-based Śląskie Kopalnie i Cynkownie S.A. in 1921 (an offshoot of the now-divided Schlesische AG für Bergbau und Zinkhüttenbetrieb) as the United Mine Matylda (Polish: Zjednoczona Koplania Matylda). In 1937 the first skips designated for coal transport were mounted at the mine.
Already before the Second World War mining at Matylda was being gradually phased out due to the deterioration of the coal market. As a result, exploitation at the East field was terminated in 1932.

The instatement of a planned economy under the Polish People's Republic saw the establishment of regional Unions of Coal Industry (Polish: Zjednoczenia Przemysłu Węglowego; ZPW), which operated as state-owned enterprises. Coal mines brought under the structure of ZPW served solely as workplaces limited to fulfilling received orders in the fields of production, administration, and sales. The Matylda Coal Mine was incorporated into the Chorzów ZPW in 1945; under which it saw the expansion of backfill machinery in 1952, the expansion of its sorting centre, baths, lamp room, infirmary and the installation of ventilators, a compressor and steam boiler in 1956.

On the 1 April 1957 the Chorzów ZPW was liquidated, and all its coal mines, including Matylda, were integrated into the Katowice ZPW. In 1965, the Matylda Coal Mine produced 538 thousand tons of coal.

=== Liquidation ===
With depletion of coal reserves, the Matylda Coal Mine was united with the Śląsk Coal Mine in Chropaczów on 1 January 1967, forming the Śląsk-Matylda Coal Mine. Plans for further expansion of Matylda were ruled out.

Although there were proposals to convert the Matylda Coal Mine into a historical monument, these were ultimately abandoned; by 1974 the former coal mine was merged with the new Śląsk Coal Mine in Ruda Śląska, with the experienced crew of the former Matylda Coal Mine making significant contributions during the coal mine's establishment. Exploitation at Matylda was terminated between 1975 and 1976, after which its facilities, buildings and machinery were systematically liquidated. the last ton of coal left the mine on 12 February 1977.

== Production ==
Coal production at KWK Matylda
Year	Production (in tonnes)
1913	803,000
1938	400,000
1965	538,000

== Gallery ==
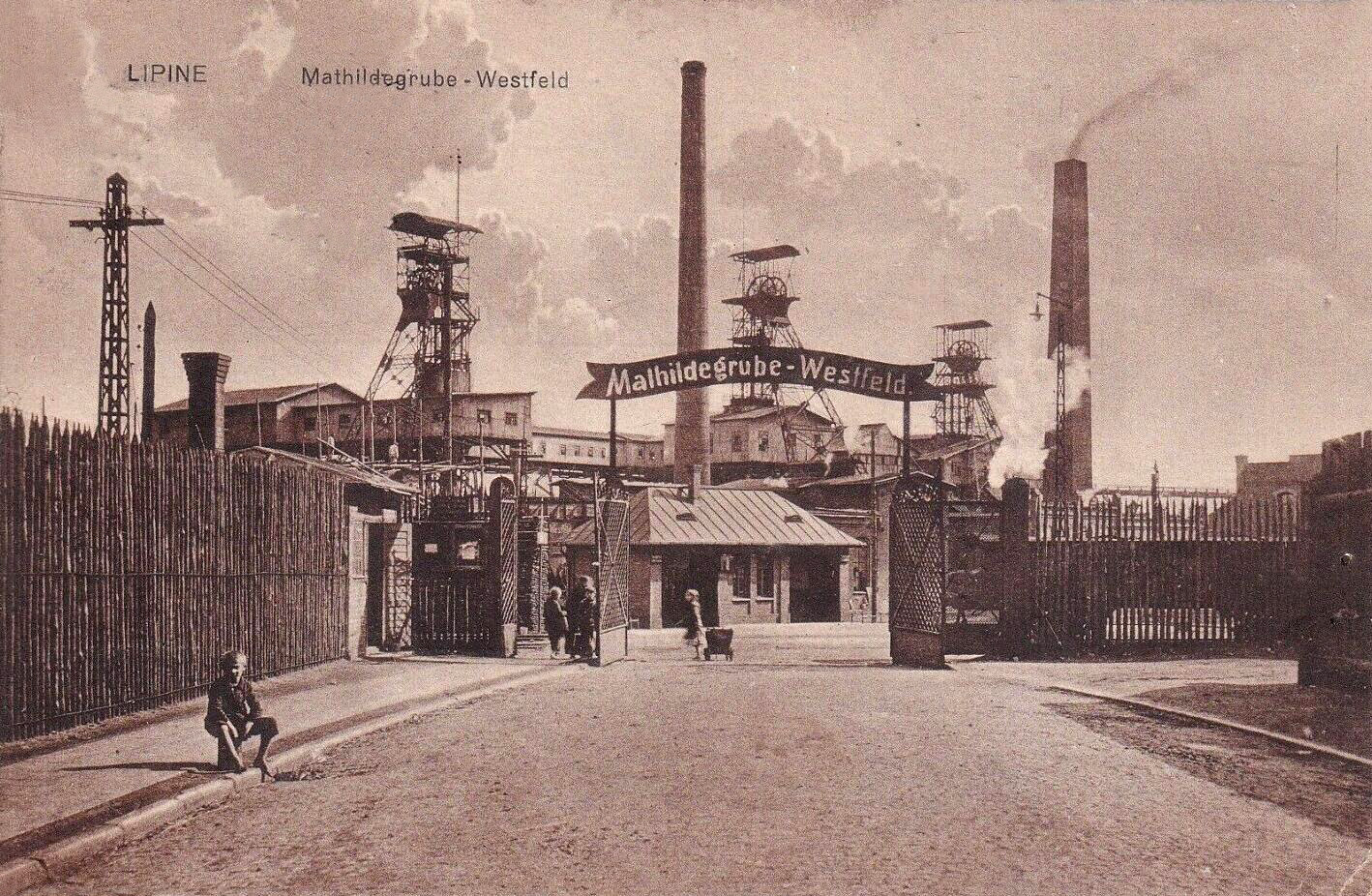
Mathilda Coal Mine - 1910s

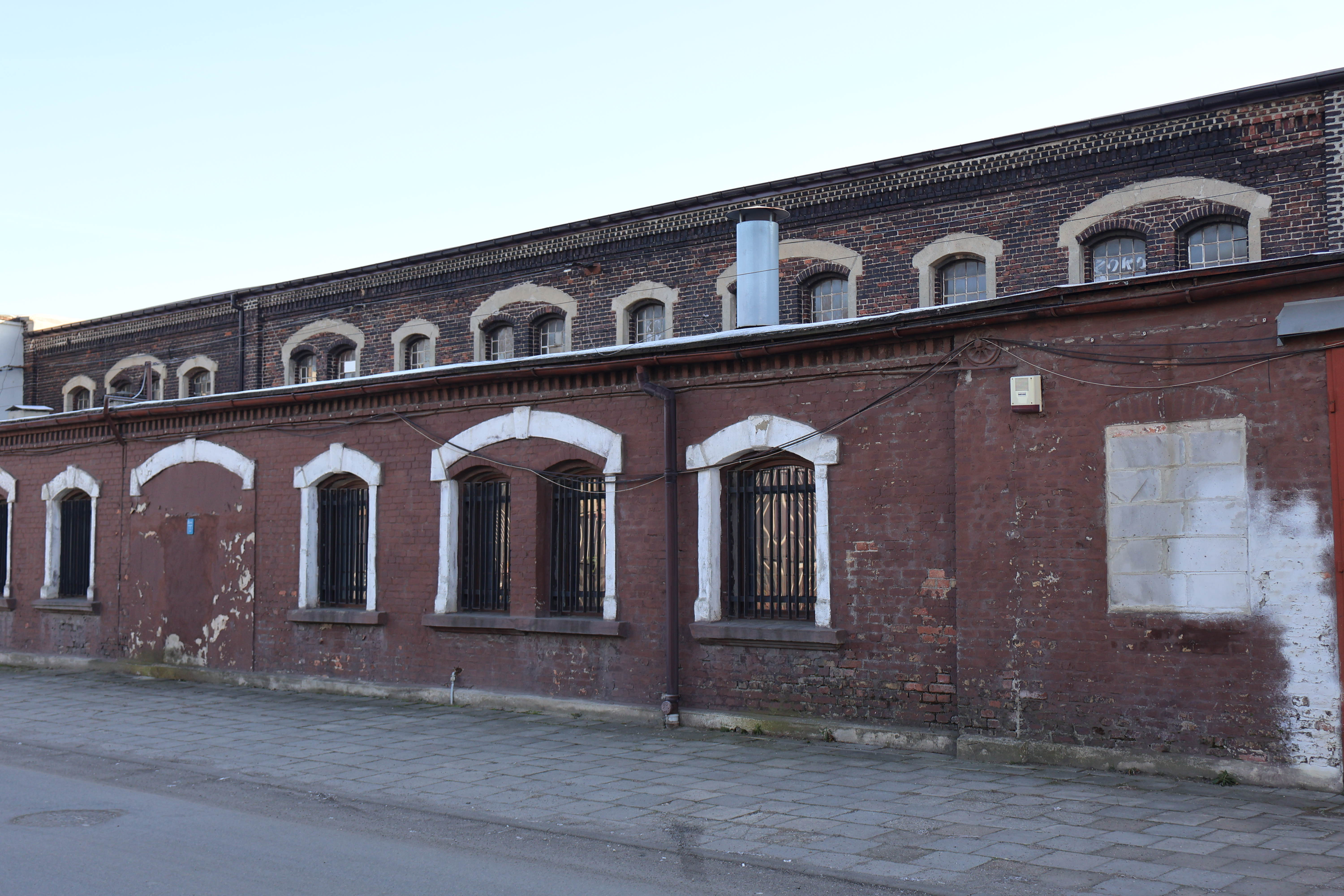
Former women's baths of the Matylda Coal Mine on Emmanuel Imiela Street 33.

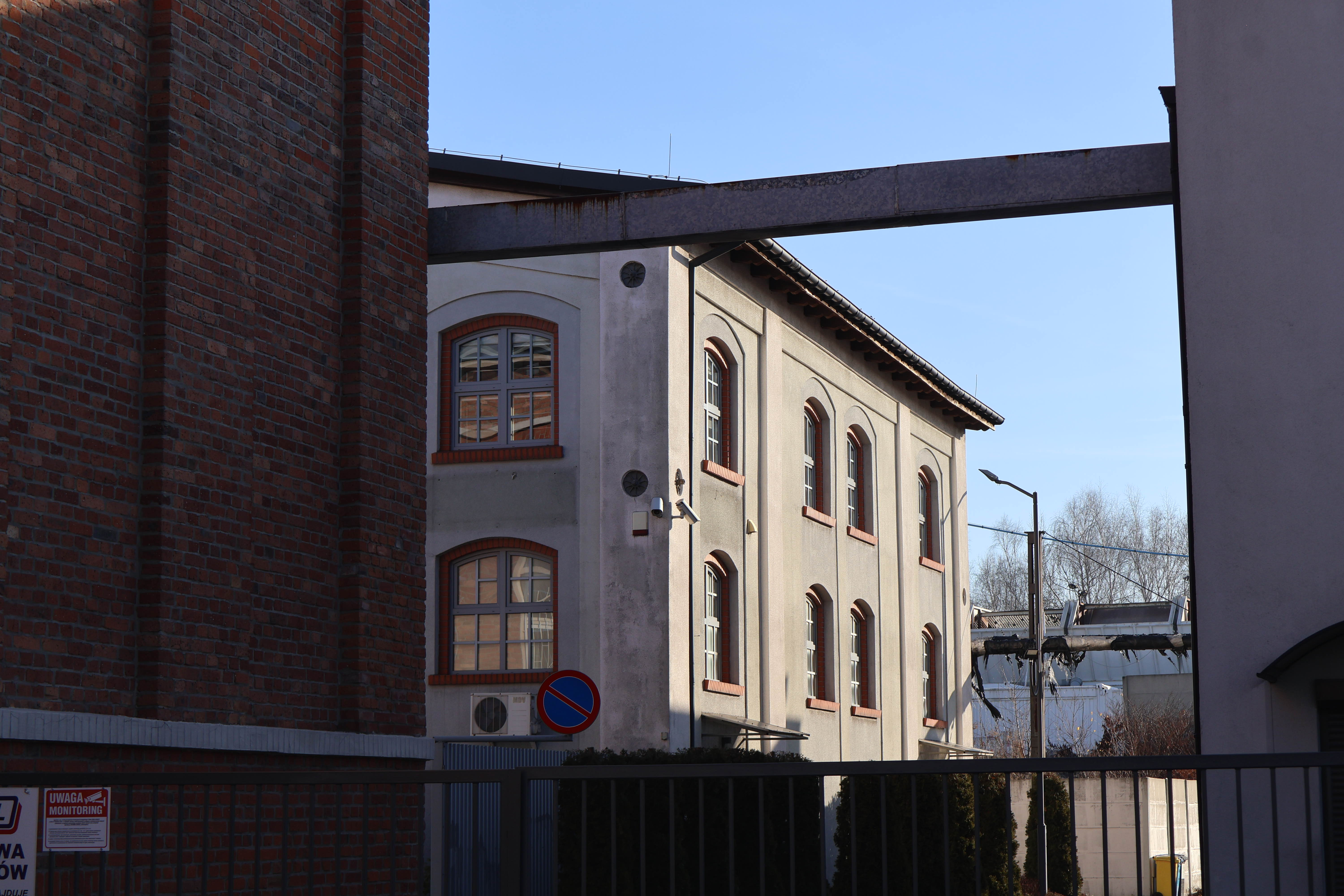
Former boiler room of the Maria Shaft and lamp room of the Matylda Coal Mine on Emmanuel Imiela Street 27.
