= Józef Murgot =

Polish footballer and coach

Personal information
- Place of birth: Chropaczów, Poland
- Date of death: 31 August 1987
- Place of death: Świętochłowice, Poland

Senior career*
Years	Team	Apps	(Gls)
- Czarni Chropaczów

Managerial career
- Zryw Chorzów
- * Club domestic league appearances and goals

Józef Murgot (died 31 August 1987) was a Polish youth association football coach, creator of Zryw Chorzów, one of the best academies in the history of Polish football. Among the players who began their careers under his supervision, were such stars as Jan Banaś, Erwin Wilczek, Zygfryd Szołtysik, Józef Janduda, and Antoni Piechniczek. Zryw's academy, led by Murgot, was twice Under-19 Champion of Poland, in 1960 and 1961.

Born in Chropaczów, a district of Świętochłowice, Murgot played for Czarni Chropaczów in his teen years. After World War II, he became a physical education teacher at Mining Vocational High School (Technikum Górnicze) in Chorzów. In 1953, he was named coach of the first football youth academy in Poland. Zryw Chorzów, as the academy was called, became an incubator of football talents in the region of Upper Silesia. Practices took place in the district of Klimzowiec, and Murgot was the coach, the manager, and the janitor of the academy. Due to the fact that he continued teaching at the high school, he was called Professor by the young players. As Zygfryd Sołtysik later recalled, Murgot would organize football games between teams of different Upper Silesian schools, looking for talents among young participants. According to Jan Banaś, Murgot went so far as to cook dinners for his young players.

In the early 1960s, Zryw Chorzów emerged as the top academy of Poland. Its under-19 team won the national championship twice, in 1960 and 1961. In the 1961 Polish U-19 final, Zryw won 10–1 over Górnik Wałbrzych, and soon afterwards, several Zryw's players were called up to the Poland under-18 team. In the 1961 UEFA European Under-18 Championship, Poland, with two Zryw players in the lineup (Szołtysik and Janduda), won silver.

Murgot continued his work until the 1970s. He died on 31 August 1987 and was buried at the Chropaczów Municipal Cemetery.
