= Pelahiivka =

Pelahiivka (Ukrainian: Пелагіївка) may refer to the following places in Ukraine:

- Pelahiivka, Donetsk Oblast
- Pelahiivka, Luhansk Oblast
- Pelahiivka, Mykolaiv Oblast
