= Chystiakove urban hromada =

Chystiakove urban hromada Чистяківська міська громада
- Hromada
- Interactive map of Chystiakove urban hromada
- Country: Ukraine
- Oblast: Donetsk Oblast
- Raion: Horlivka Raion
- Settlements: 6
- Cities: 1
- Rural settlements: 3
- Villages: 2

Chystiakove urban hromada (Ukrainian: Чистяківська міська громада) is a hromada of Ukraine, located in Horlivka Raion, Donetsk Oblast. Its administrative center is the city Chystiakove.

The hromada contains 6 settlements: 1 city (Chystiakove), 3 rural settlements (Balochne, Pelahiivka, and Rozsypne), and 2 villages (Hrabove and Rivne).

== See also ==
- List of hromadas of Ukraine
