= Lipiny (Świętochłowice) =

District of Świętochłowice

- District of Świętochłowice
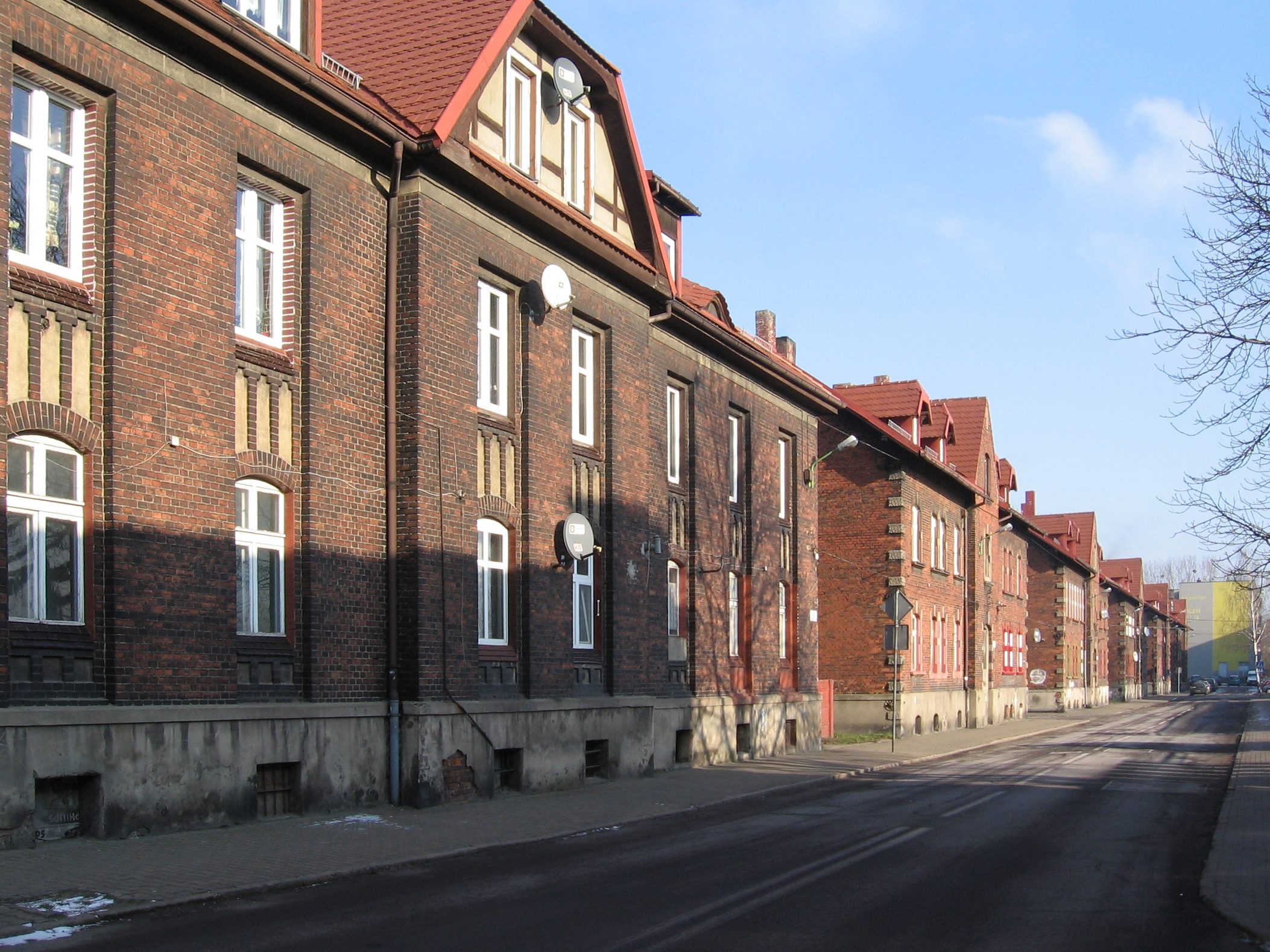
- Moniuszki Street

- Map of Świętochłowice, Lipiny marked in yellow
- Coordinates: 50°18′21″N 18°54′7″E
- Country: Poland
- Voivodeship: Silesian
- County/City: Świętochłowice
- Within town limits: 1951
- Time zone: UTC+1 (CET)
  - Summer (DST): UTC+2 (CEST)
- Vehicle registration: SW
- Primary airport: Katowice Airport

Lipiny (German: Lipine) is a district of the Upper Silesian town of Świętochłowice, southern Poland. In the north, Lipiny borders the city of Bytom, in the west the city of Ruda Śląska, in the east it borders the districts of Chropaczów and Piaśniki, while in the south Lipiny borders the center of the town.

== History ==
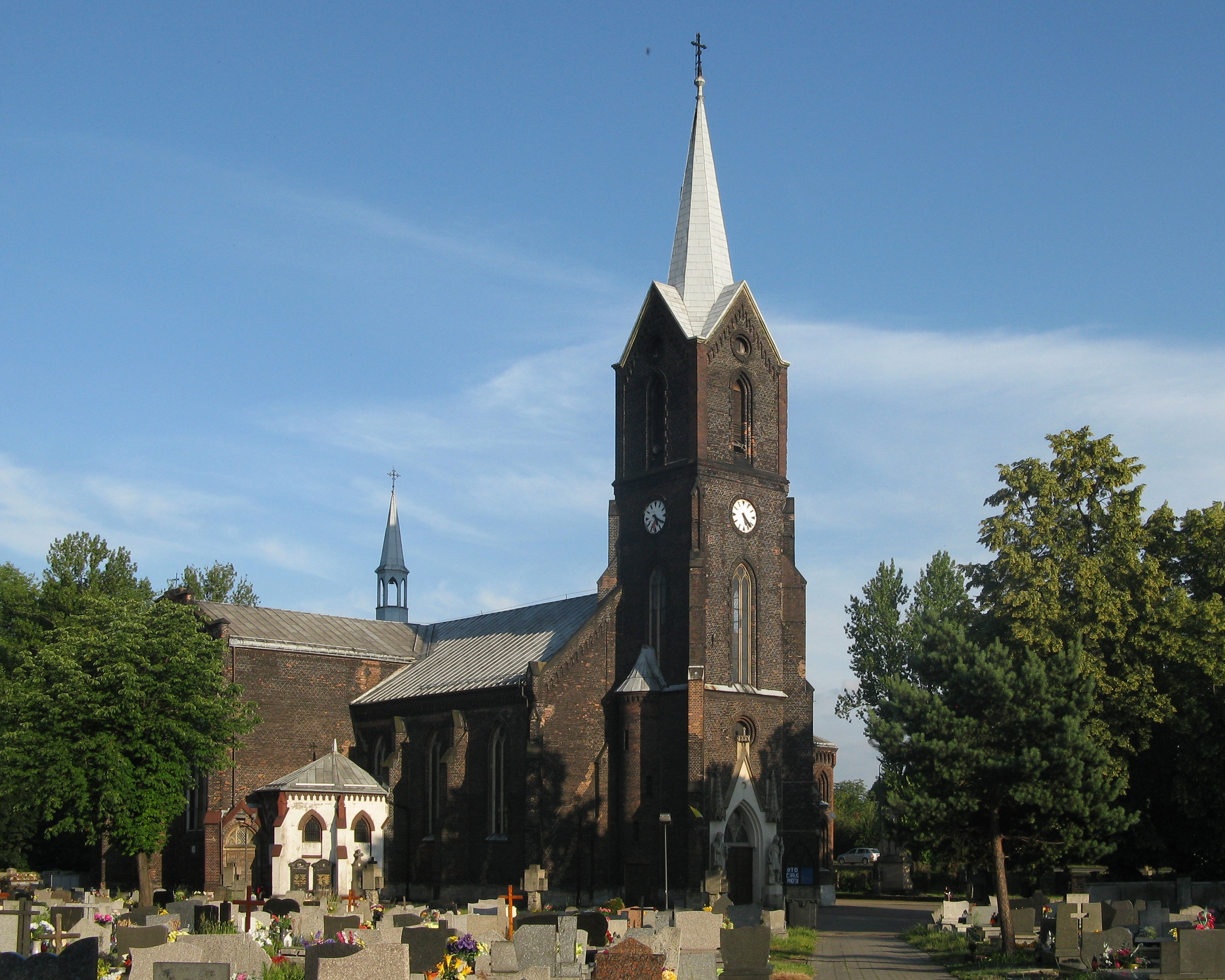
Saint Augustine church

Lipiny is the youngest district of Świętochłowice, with history dating back to the early 19th century, when, together with whole Silesia, it belonged to the Kingdom of Prussia. At that time, a folwark, mentioned in 1802, existed there, as part of the Chropaczow estate of Georg Christian Carl Henschel. The folwark, whose area was 75 hectares, was located at the edge of a forest, where Lipiny's main thoroughfare, Chorzowska Street (former Kronprinzstrasse) runs now. For some time, the sole resident of the estate was a voigt named Lipina, after whom the district was later named. Near his residence, several houses of forest workers were later built.

In the 19th century Lipiny, or Lipine, as part of the German Empire quickly developed and emerged as a major industrial center, with Zinc Smelter Silesia, opened in 1847 as Konstancja Steelworks. The plant, which was vastly expanded in the 1860s and 1880s, was in the early 20th century the largest zinc smelter in Europe. In 1961, Zinc Smelter Silesia was merged with Zinc Smelter Wełnowiec, located in Katowice (former Hohenlohe Steelworks), to create Metallurgical Works Silesia, based in Katowice. In 1998–2000, the Lipiny smelter was gradually closed, and in 2001 the former plant was purchased by a private company.

By mid-19th century, the population of Lipiny reached over 1100, and quickly grew, due to the rapid expansion of the settlement. In 1864, first hospital was opened in Lipine. Its construction was financed by the zinc smelter, and in 1873, a post office was opened. Three years later, Lipiny received its first rail connection with Bytom. The quickly growing settlement was in 1879 detached from Chropaczów, waterworks were constructed and a fire station. In 1872, Roman Catholic St. Barbara church was completed, and in 1875, Matylda Coal Mine was opened. By the early 20th century, Lipiny had a tram line to Bytom.

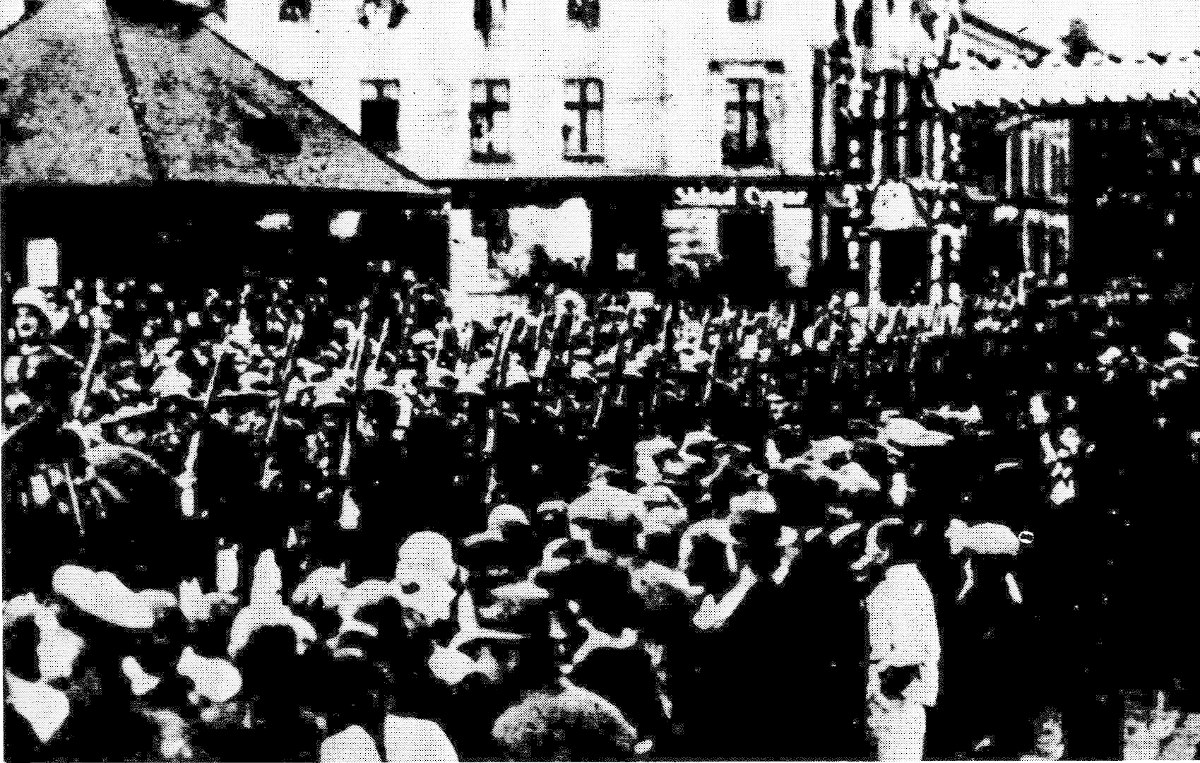
Polish troops in Lipiny in 1922

In the early 20th century, several Polish organizations were founded in Lipiny, together with Polish choir, a branch of the Polish Sokół movement, and a bookstore. German harassment made it impossible to rent premises for Sokół and led to the dismissal of several members from their jobs, so meetings were held in private apartments and Sokół premises in nearby Chorzów and Katowice. Polish residents of the settlement actively participated in the Silesian Uprisings. In the 1921 Upper Silesian Plebiscite, 56.4% of residents of Lipiny voted for Poland, and as a result, the settlement was annexed into the Second Polish Republic. In 1924, a monument dedicated to the Silesian Uprisings was unveiled in Lipiny. In the interbellum period Lipiny was regarded as one of the most advanced and developed among Polish communes, but also one of the most polluted in Europe. It was also home to a football team Naprzód Lipiny.

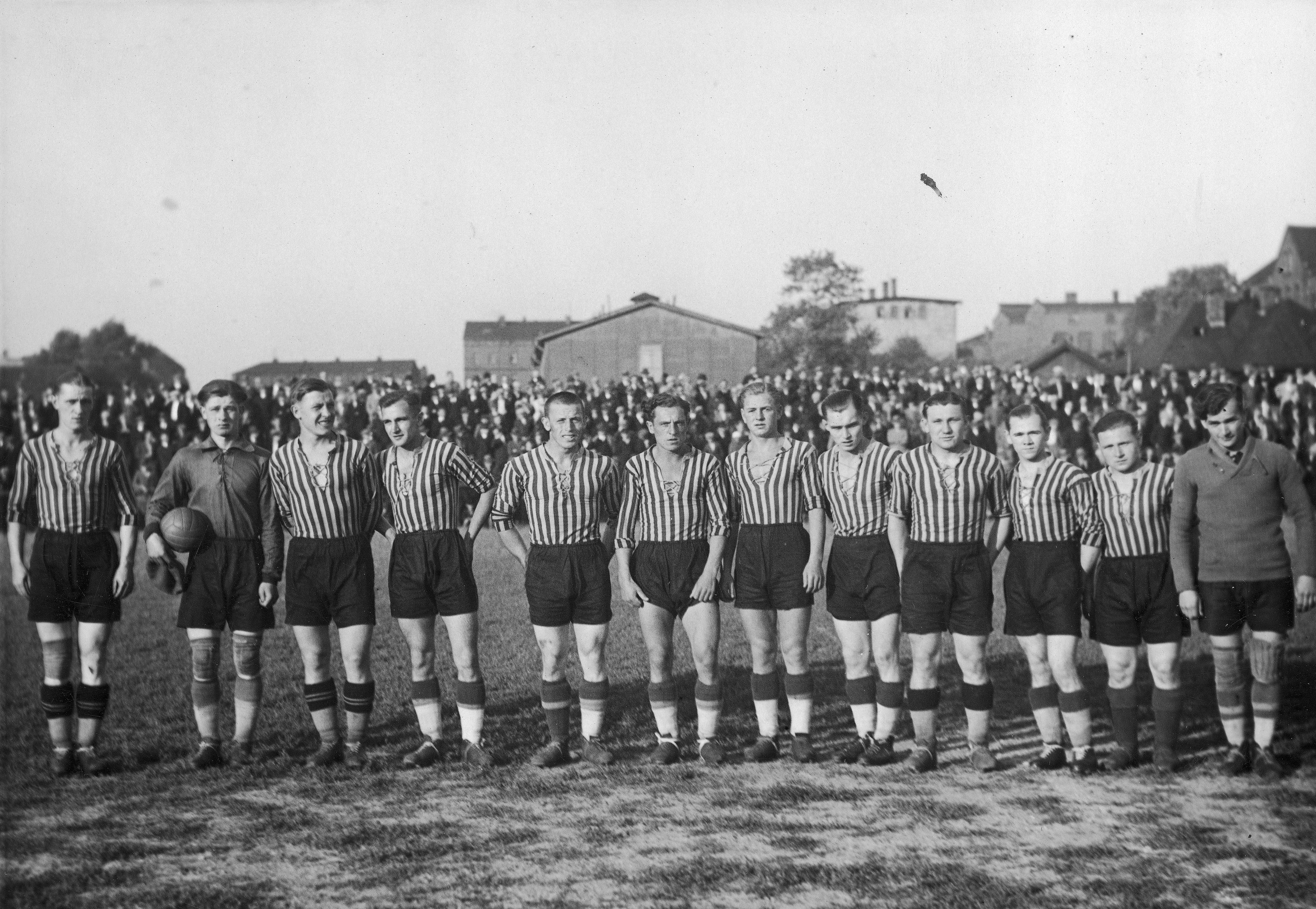
Naprzód Lipiny football team in 1937

In the night of September 2/3 1939, Lipiny was seized by the Wehrmacht, and was afterwards occupied by Germany. At least 13 people from Lipiny, including the primary school principal, two school teachers and nine policemen were murdered by the Russians in the Katyn massacre in 1940. On January 28, 1945 the Red Army units entered the settlement and it was then restored to Poland. In 1946, all plants were nationalized, and on March 17, 1951, Lipiny was annexed by the town of Świętochłowice.

== Sources ==
- Taki był początek Lipin (in Polish)
