= Zgoda, Swiętochłowice =

Zgoda
- Świętochłowice District
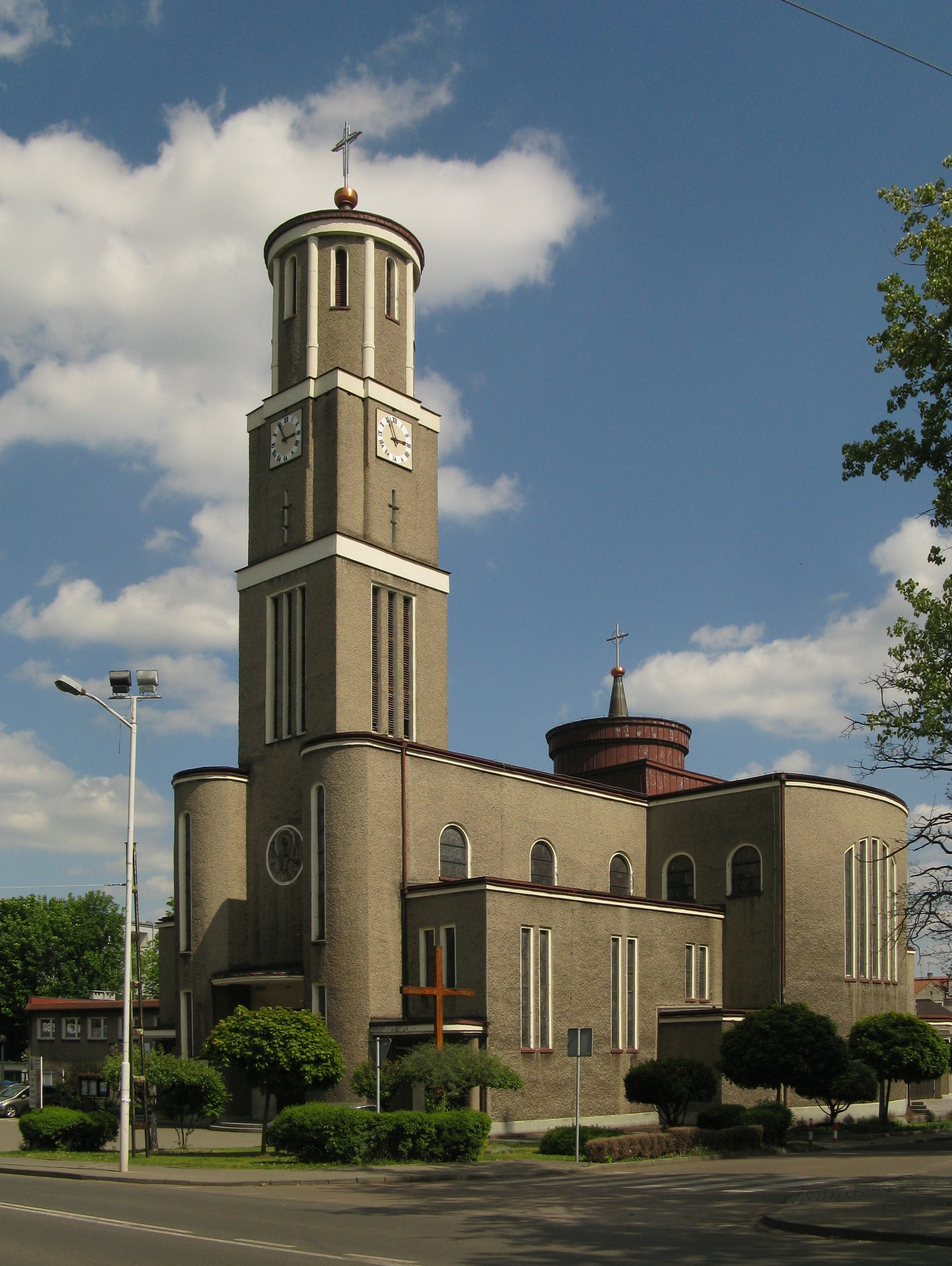
- St. Joseph church (2020)

- Location of Zgoda within Świętochłowice
- Coordinates: 50°16′55″N 18°54′21″E
- Country: Poland
- Voivodeship: Silesian
- County/City: Świętochłowice

Population (2013)
  - Total: 6,273
- Time zone: UTC+1 (CET)
  - Summer (DST): UTC+2 (CEST)
- Area code: (+48) 032

Zgoda (German: Eintrachthütte) is a district in the south of Świętochłowice, Silesian Voivodeship, southern Poland. In 2013 it had a population of 6,273 people.

== History ==
Until the early 19th century the area was covered by Bytom's Black Forest (German: Beuthener Schwarzwald, Polish: Czarny Las), which was first mentioned in 1369. In the 19th century numerous industrial establishment were opened in the area, including in 1839 the Eintracht steel mill, German Eintrachthütte, the future name-giver to the settlement, administratively a part of Friedenshütte municipality, now Nowy Bytom, a district of Ruda Śląska. In 1883 the settlement became a seat of a new Roman Catholic parish.

After World War I, the Silesian Uprisings and the Upper Silesia plebiscite it became a part of Silesian Voivodeship, Second Polish Republic and was renamed to Polish Zgoda. On 1 January 1920it was separated from Nowy Bytom and joined into Świętochłowice. After the war it was restored to Poland. The original Saint Joseph church was replaced with the modern one in 1931. It was then annexed by Nazi Germany at the beginning of World War II. During the war it was the seat of Eintrachthütte concentration camp and after the war of the Zgoda labour camp.

The Zgoda (former Eintracht) ceased to function in 2008.
