= Rozsypne, Donetsk Oblast =

Urban locality in Donetsk Oblast, Ukraine

Rozsypne Розсипне
- Rural settlement
- Location of Rozsypne Rozsypne (Ukraine)
- Coordinates: 48°07′47″N 38°33′56″E
- Country: Ukraine
- Oblast: Donetsk Oblast
- Raion: Horlivka Raion
- Elevation: 316 m (1,037 ft)

Population (2022)
  - Total: 4,997
- Time zone: UTC+2
  - Summer (DST): UTC+3
- Postal code: 86691—86694
- Area code: +380 6254

Rozsypne (Ukrainian: Розсипне) is a rural settlement in Chystiakove urban hromada, Horlivka Raion, Donetsk Oblast, eastern Ukraine. Population: 4,997 (2022 estimate).

== Demographics ==
Native language as of the Ukrainian Census of 2001:

- Ukrainian 19.08%
- Russian 80.25%
- Belarusian 0.22%
- Armenian and Moldovan (Romanian) 0.02%
