= Kordian Jajszczok =

Polish ice hockey player (1950–2024)

- Born: 4 September 1950; Świętochłowice, Poland
- Died: 5 October 2024 (aged 74)
- Height: 5 ft 9 in (175 cm)
- Weight: 165 lb (75 kg; 11 st 11 lb)
- Position: Defence
- Played for: GKS Katowice
- National team: Poland
- NHL draft: Undrafted
- Playing career: 1969–1987

Kordian Klaudiusz Jajszczok (4 September 1950 – 5 October 2024) was a Polish ice hockey player. He played for the Poland men's national ice hockey team at the 1976 Winter Olympics in Innsbruck.

Jajszczok died on 5 October 2024, at the age of 74.
