= Eintrachthütte concentration camp =

Eintrachthütte
- Subcamp of the Auschwitz concentration camp
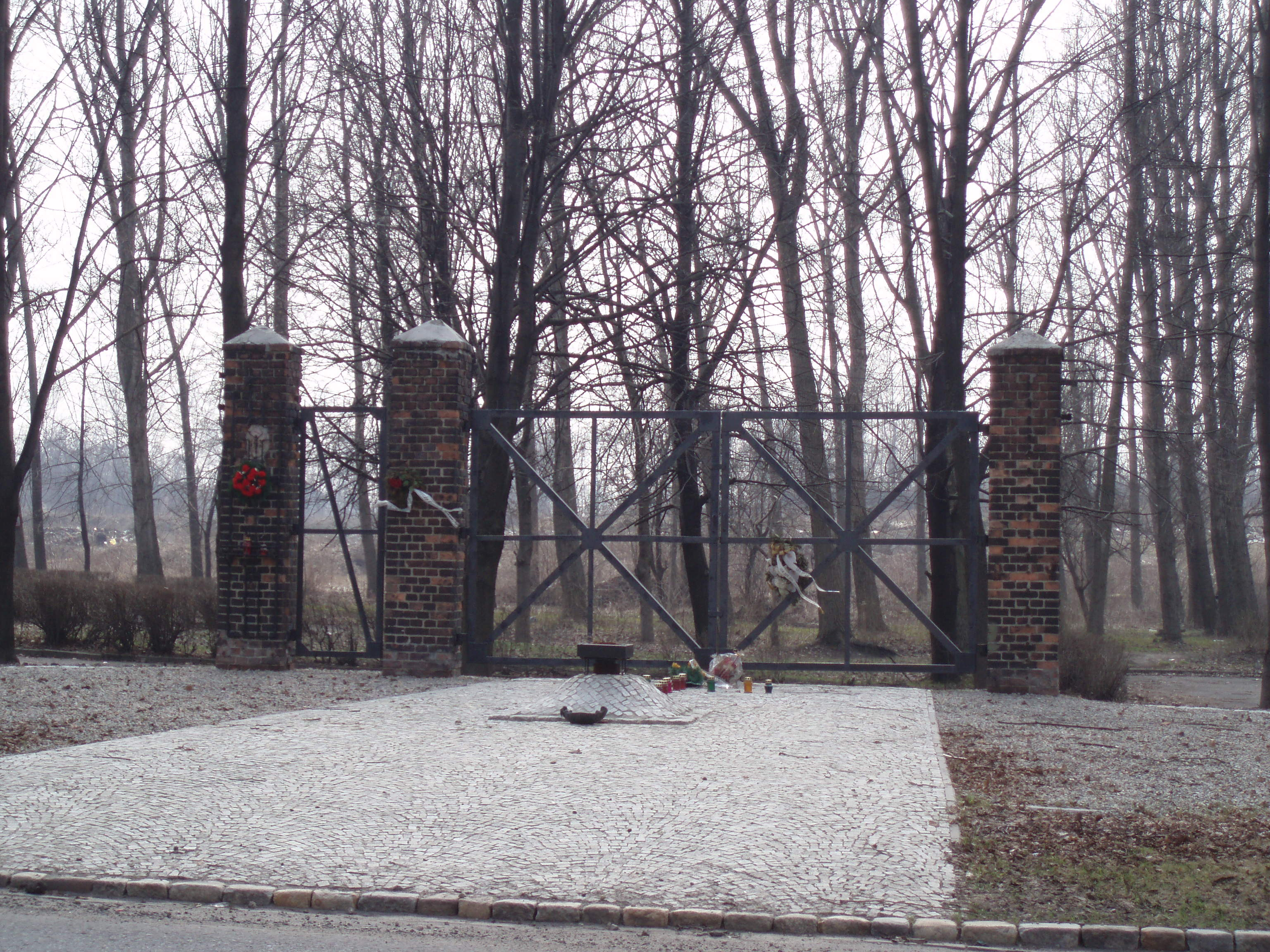
- Entrance gate to the camp, today a memorial

- Location of the former Eintrachthütte concentration camp in Poland
- Coordinates: 50°16′46″N 18°54′03″E
- Known for: Forced labour
- Location: Świętochłowice, German-occupied Poland
- Commandant: Josef Remmele, May 1943 – July 1944; Wilhelm Gehring, July 1944 – January 1945
- Operational: 26 May 1943 – 23 January 1945
- Inmates: Poles, Jews, Russians

Eintrachthütte concentration camp (German: Arbeitslager Eintrachtshütte) was a labour subcamp of the German concentration camp Auschwitz, opened in the Zgoda district in Świętochłowice in German-occupied Poland on 26 May 1943, in operation until 23 January 1945. Among its prisoners were Poles, Jews and Russians. Its commanders were SS-Hauptscharführer Josef Remmele (from the creation to July 1944) and SS-Hauptscharführer Wilhelm Gehring (from 18 July 1944 to the end of camp operation on 23 January 1945). Both were brutal in relations to the prisoners, involved in tortures, and personally involved in executions carried out at the camp.

== Accommodation ==
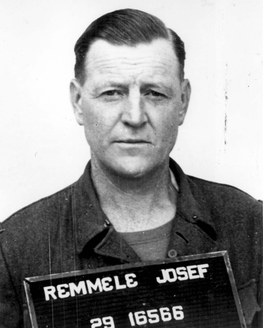
Josef Remmele, commander of the camp from May 1943 to July 1944, post-war mug shot

The camp consisted of six wooden barracks for the prisoners, and a brick administration building. It was double fenced with high-voltage barbwire. The space between the fences was 1.5 m and covered with sand. There were 10 spotlights and four guard towers in the camp corners.

The prisoner living conditions were typical for these kind of camps. The prisoners lived in two-room barracks. The beds were three-level high, with straw-packed mattresses and blankets. Each room accommodated 60 to 80 prisoners. The food was sparse. For breakfast, coffee substitute was given; for dinner, a spinach soup or similar and occasionally a piece of sausage; for supper, coffee substitute, small portion of margarine, some cheese and 0.25 kg of bread, which was meant to be divided between the supper and the following breakfast.

== Inmates ==
The prisoners were initially mostly Poles, and later also Jews, and people from other countries at war with Nazi Germany. The maximum number of prisoners at one time was 1374. The purpose of the camp was to provide workforce to a nearby armament factory (nowadays ZUT Zgoda SA) and the prisoners were employed by companies OSMAG (Oberschlesische Maschinen und Waggonfabrik AG) and Ost-Maschinenbau. Sick or unable to work prisoners were sent back to the mother camp. The mortality was high with a weekly toll of 10 to 15. The overall number of casualties during the period of camp operation is estimated at several hundred (the camp documents perished therefore the exact number is not known).

In May 1944, several prisoners (Russians, a Pole and a Jew) managed to escape through a 25-meter tunnel.

== Evacuation ==
The Eintrachthütte camp was evacuated by Germans, who deported its prisoners to the Mauthausen concentration camp, leaving only several sick prisoners behind, and taken by the Red Army on 23 January 1945. Part of its facilities were later used by Zgoda labour camp.

== See also ==
- List of concentration and internment camps
