= Pelahiivka, Luhansk Oblast =

Village in Luhansk Oblast, Ukraine

Pelahiivka Пелагіївка
- Location of Pelahiivka Pelahiivka (Ukraine)
- Coordinates: 49°47′26″N 38°56′49″E
- Country: Ukraine
- Oblast: Luhansk Oblast
- Raion: Starobilsk Raion
- Elevation: 71 m (233 ft)

Population (2001)
  - Total: 63
- Time zone: UTC+2
  - Summer (DST): UTC+3
- Postal code: 92313
- Area code: +380 6463

Pelahiivka (Ukrainian: Пелагіївка) is a village in Starobilsk Raion, Luhansk Oblast, eastern Ukraine.

Until 18 July 2020, Pelahiivka was located in Novopskov Raion. The raion was abolished in July 2020 as part of the administrative reform of Ukraine, which reduced the number of raions of Luhansk Oblast to eight, of which only four were controlled by the government. The area of Novopskov Raion was merged into Starobilsk Raion.
