= Balochne =

Balochne Балочне
- Rural settlement
- Location within Ukraine
- Coordinates: 48°06′57″N 38°33′14″E
- Country: Ukraine
- Oblast: Donetsk Oblast

Population (2001 census)
  - Total: 18
- Time zone: UTC+2 (EET)
  - Summer (DST): UTC+3 (EEST)
- Postal code: 86234
- Area code: +380 6255

Balochne (Ukrainian: Балочне) is a rural settlement in Horlivka Raion, Donetsk Oblast, eastern Ukraine. As of 2001 it had a population of 18 people.
