= Chystiakove =

City in the Donbas region

Chystiakove Чистякове (Ukrainian) Чистяково (Russian) Torez (Note: Ukrainian and Russian: Торез)
- City
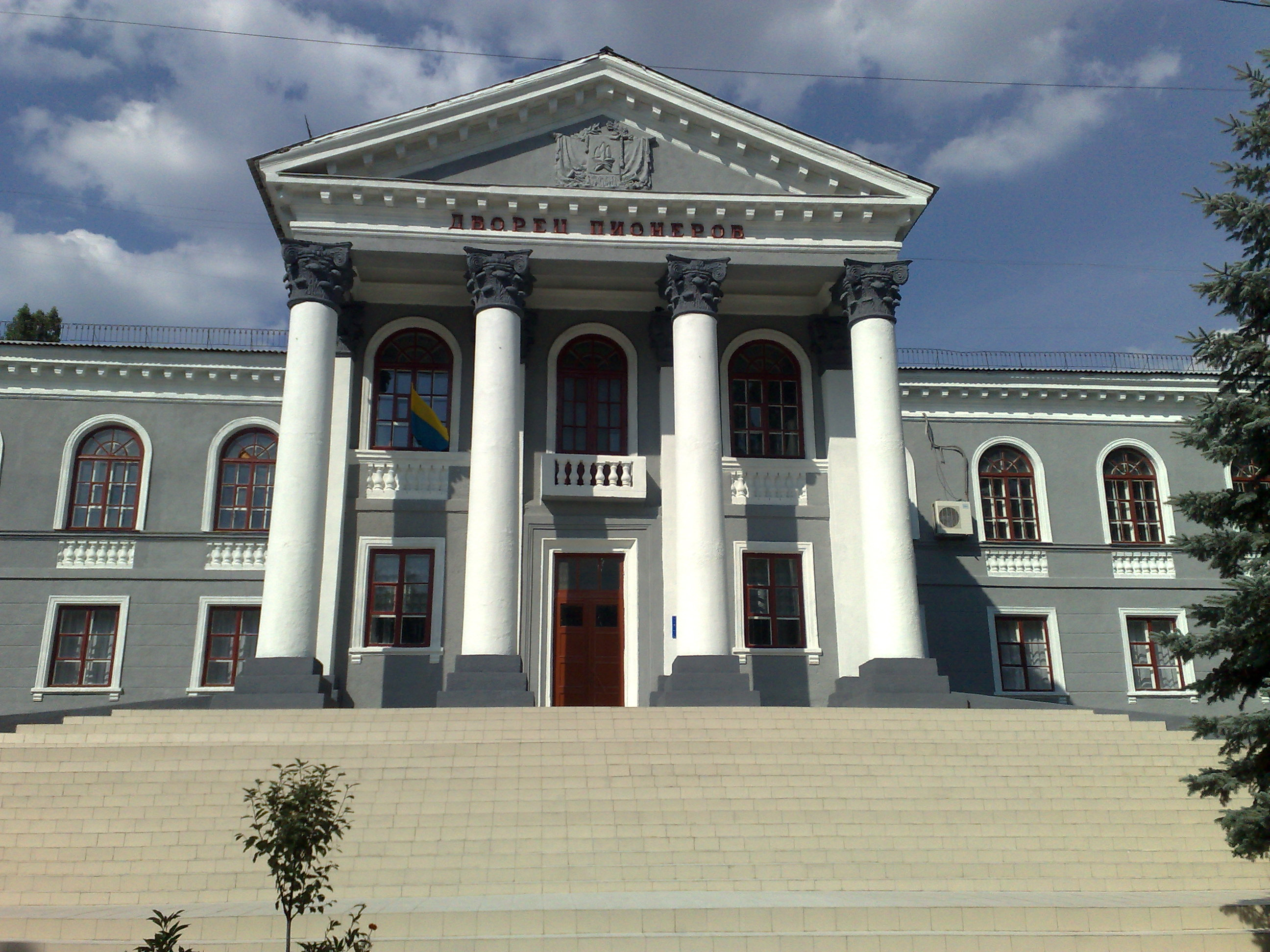
- Children's Creativity Palace

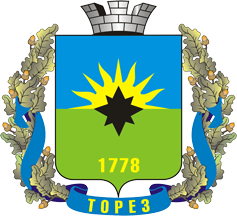
- Flag Seal
- Interactive map of Chystiakove
- Location within Donetsk Oblast Location within Ukraine
- Coordinates: 48°1′19″N 38°37′35″E
- Country: Ukraine/Russia (Note: The city is claimed by Russia (Donetsk People's Republic) but is recognized by most countries as part of Ukraine (Donetsk Oblast))
- Oblast (Note: According to Ukraine): Donetsk Oblast
- Republic (Note: According to Russia): Donetsk People's Republic
- Raion: Horlivka Raion
- Hromada: Chystiakove urban hromada
- Founded: 1778

Area
  - Total: 105.8 km^{2} (40.8 sq mi)

Population (2022)
  - Total: 53,462
- Climate: Dfb
- Website: Official site (archived)

Chystiakove (Ukrainian: Чистякове, IPA: [tʃɪsʲtʲɐˈkɔwe]; Russian: Чистяково, romanized: Chistyakovo), formerly known as Torez (Ukrainian and Russian: Торез) is a city in Ukraine. The city is a center of the regional coal industry and much of its economy relies on mining, despite a recent drop in the number of employed miners. The city has a population of 53,462 (2022 estimate).

Founded in 1778, the city was named Chistiakovo in 1868. It was renamed Torez in 1964 in honor of Maurice Thorez, a leader of the French Communist Party. In 2016, the Ukrainian parliament changed the name to Chystiakove as part of its decommunization laws.

Pro-Russian separatists took control of Chystiakove in June 2014.

== History ==
=== In the Russian Empire ===
The region was settled in 1778 at the confluence of the Sevostyanivka and Orlova Rivers (part of the Mius River basin) by runaway serfs from the southern regions of the Russian Empire. By 1800 the settlement, with 225 residents, was known as the sloboda Alekseevka after a son of the founder, general S. Leonov. From 1840 it was named Alekseevo-Leonovo, and from 1868 Chistiakovo, after the major landowner in the area, the Taganrog merchant Chistiakov.

By the 1860s the town was a coal-mining hub. In 1875, two mining companies were founded: Chistiakovskoe (which operated two coal mines) and Alekseevskoe, which was renamed Nadezhda in 1907. The mines produced 4.7 million poods of coal in 1909, and 76.8 million poods by 1916.

=== Soviet period ===
In 1924 the Chistiakovo mining industry had 142 settlements, with a total of 44,679 residents. Eight years later the settlements became a town, and the town's ten coal-mining quarries were incorporated into the Chistiakovugol Industrial Trust a year after that.

As part of the Ukrainian SSR, where it was known (in Ukrainian) as Chistyakove, the town expanded and was granted city status in 1932. By the 1940s it comprised three administrative districts:

- Red Star district (Ukrainian: Червона Зірка), established after a settlement belonging to the Red Star mining enterprise was incorporated into the town.
- Southern Group district (Ukrainian: Південна група), established after a settlement belonging to the Southern Group of mines was incorporated.
- Chystiakove Station

During World War II, Chystiakove was occupied by the German Army from 31 October 1941 to 2 September 1943. In 1942, the Germans operated the Stalag 385 prisoner-of-war camp in the town, which was then relocated to Nikopol.

In 1964 Chystiakove was renamed Torez in honor of Maurice Thorez, the longtime leader of the French Communist Party who purported in his autobiography to have been a coal miner.

In 2012, the city's population was 81,761, down from a 1970 peak of about 120,000.

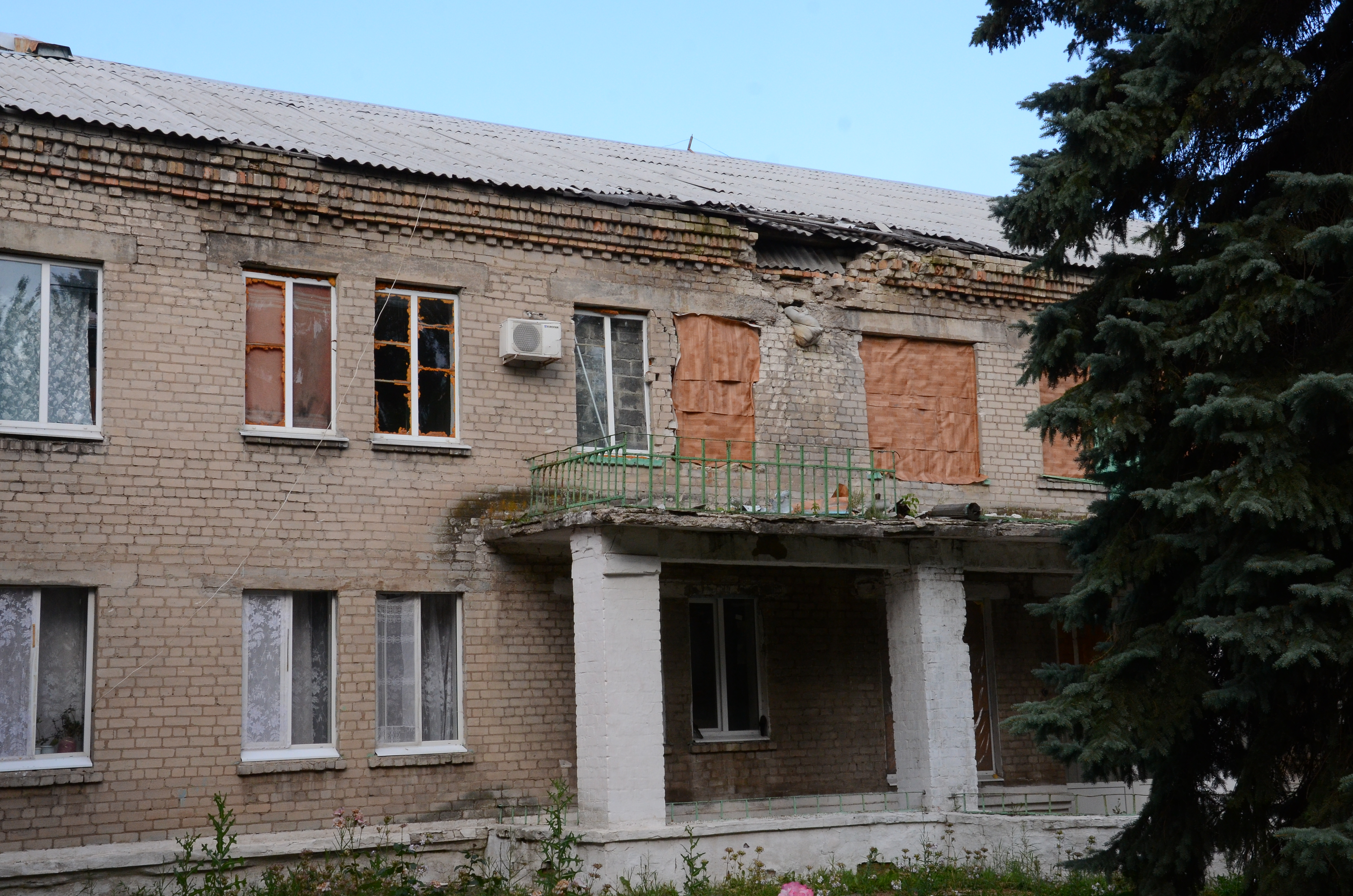
War-damaged building in 2015

In mid-April 2014 pro-Russian separatists captured several towns in Donetsk Oblast, including Chystiakove in June 2014. On 23 May 2014, a pro-Ukrainian militia endorsed by Oleh Lyashko killed a pro-Russian separatist and left another badly wounded amidst the separatists' takeover of the city hall.

== Demographics ==
As of the 2001 Ukrainian census:

Ethnicity

- Ukrainians: 50.8%
- Russians: 45.1%
- Belarusians: 1.3%
- Tatars: 1.3%
- Armenians: 0.2%
- Greeks: 0.1%

Native language

- Russian: 81.83%
- Ukrainian: 17.03%
- Belarusian: 0.18%
- Armenian: 0.11%
- Moldovan: 0.03%
- Bulgarian: 0.01%
- Greek: 0.01%

== Transportation ==
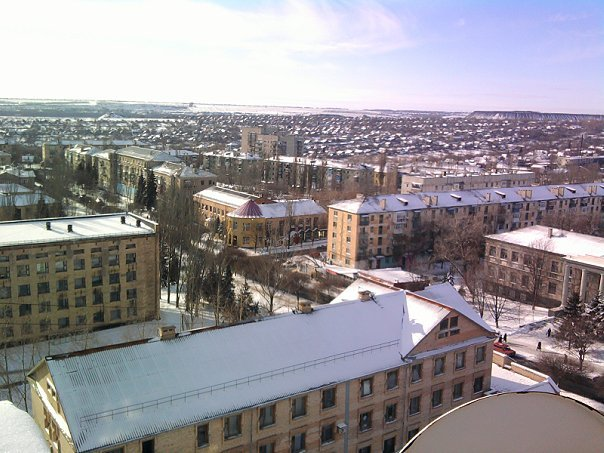
Mykolaiv and Pioneerska Streets in central Chystiakove

Chystiakove's transport system consists of thirty-one routes served by buses and taxis and links to the cities of Snizhne and Shakhtarsk. The Luhansk-Donetsk Highway runs for nine kilometers through the center of the city. The bus station (vulytsia Popovycha) provides service to Donetsk, Kharkiv and other cities in eastern Ukraine. The city has three major railway stations: Torez (vulytsia Vokzalna), Rozsypne and Pelahiyivka. Two stations serve electric commuter trains: Dronove in Pelahiyivka and Voskresenska in central Chystiakove.

== Economy ==
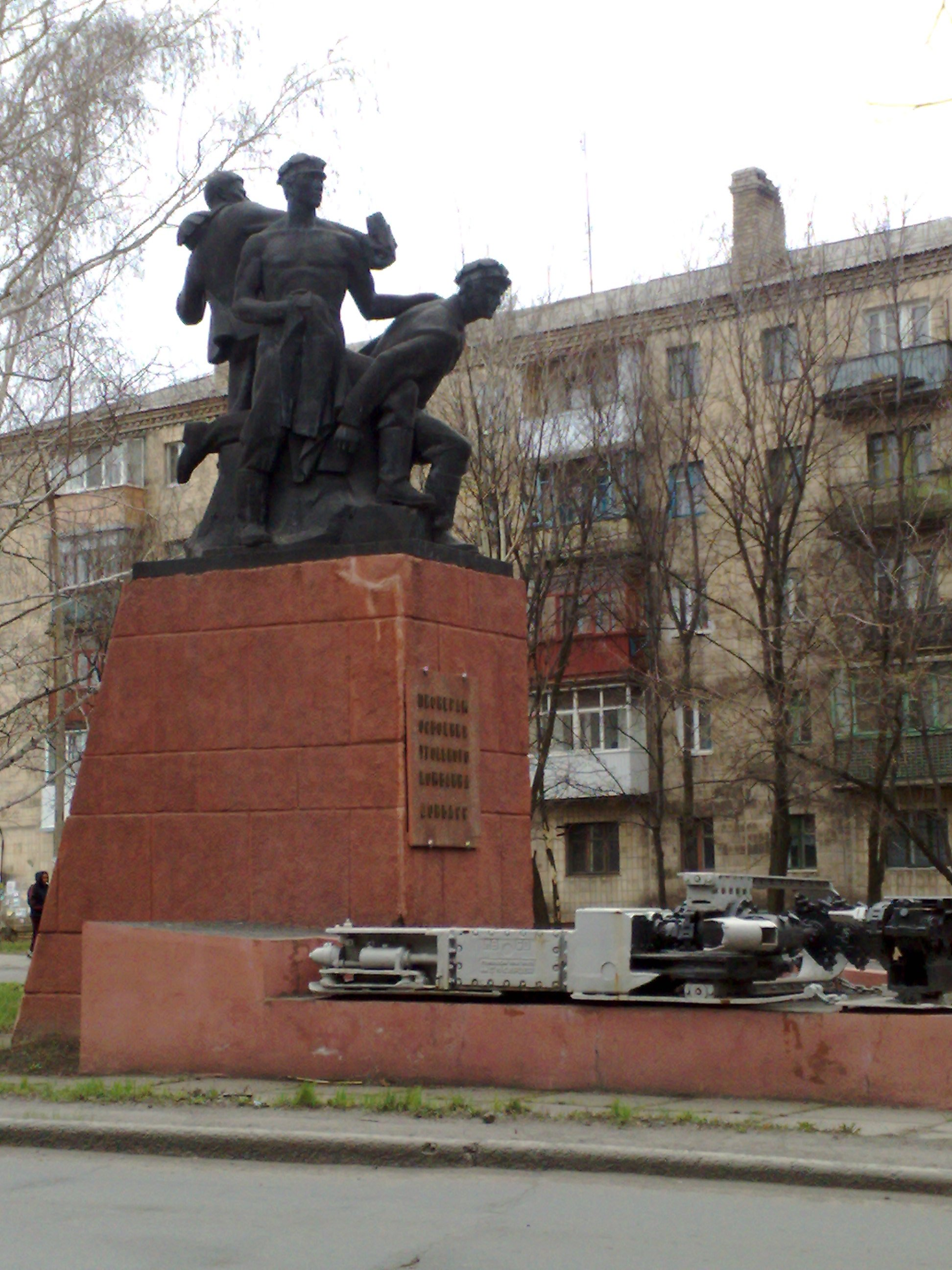
Donbas mining monument

Chystiakove's major company is the state-owned Torez Anthracite, which specializes in coal mining. The company controls a number of mines and production facilities, including the Progress Mine, the Lutugin and Volhynian Mine Administrations and the Chystiakove factory. Other employers include the Chystiakove electrical and alloy factories, the Vuhleresurs Company's Terra mine, the State Penal Department and the Chystiakove food-testing factory.

== Neighborhoods ==
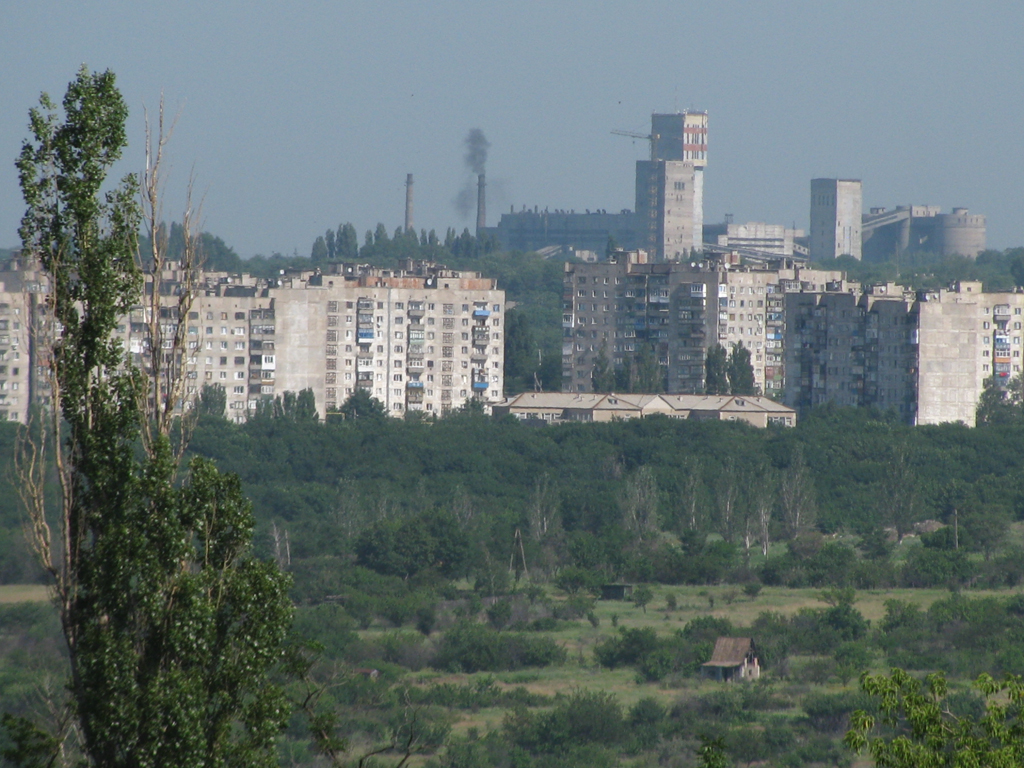
Progress coal mine

Chystiakove's center includes Pionerska, Nikolaeva, Engels, Syzrantsev and 50 Years of the USSR Streets, Gagarin Avenue and Illich Boulevard. Neighborhoods are numbered one through four (Engels Street), 30th Anniversary of Victory, G and Red Star (Chervona Zirka).

Central Village (Ukrainian: Cелище центральне) in southeastern Chystiakove was one of the first settlements in Chystiakove. It has an acting school and two kindergartens. Shanghai, a small residential area also in southeastern Chystiakove, was built in 1946 by Hungarian prisoners of war and consists of seven-story apartment buildings. In addition to Chystiakove, its city council governs two towns: Pelahiyivka and Rozsypne.

== Gallery ==
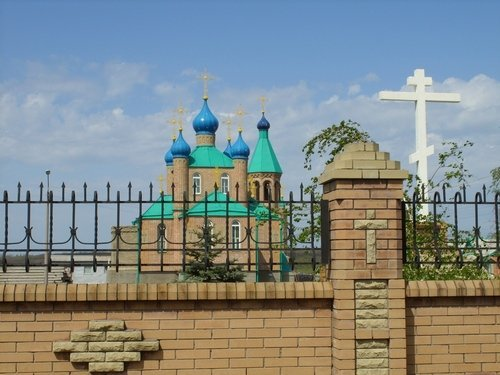
Orthodox Church

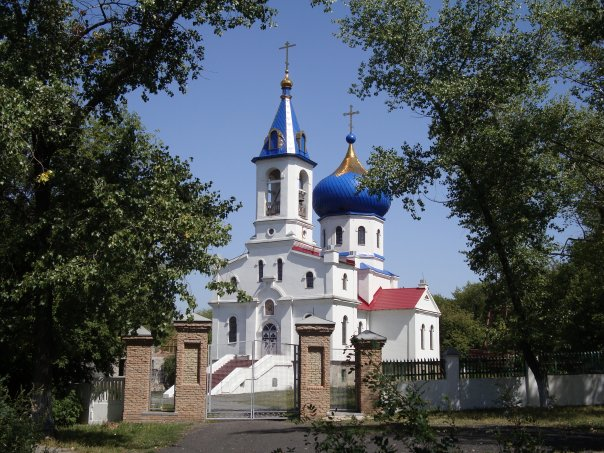
St. Elias Church

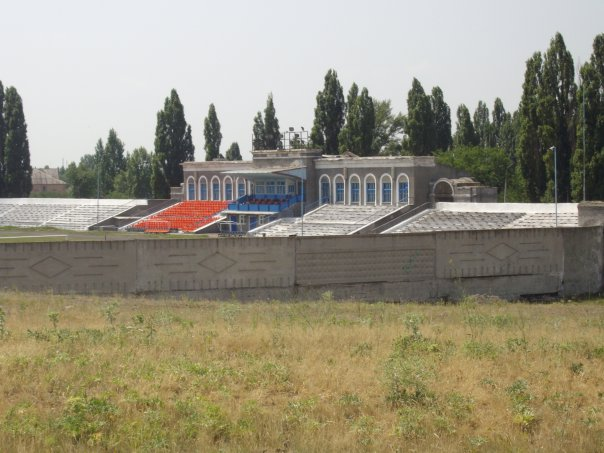
Komsomolets Stadium

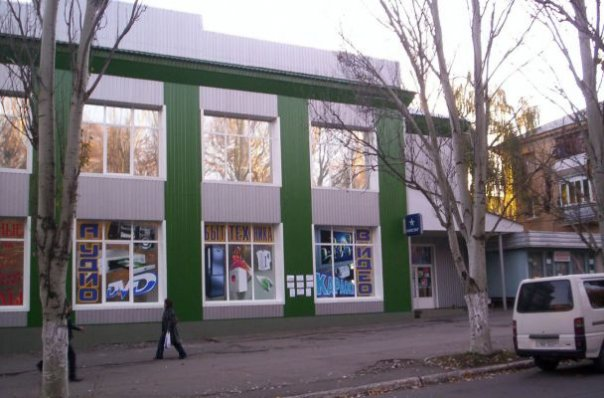
Central Department Store, Ilyich Street

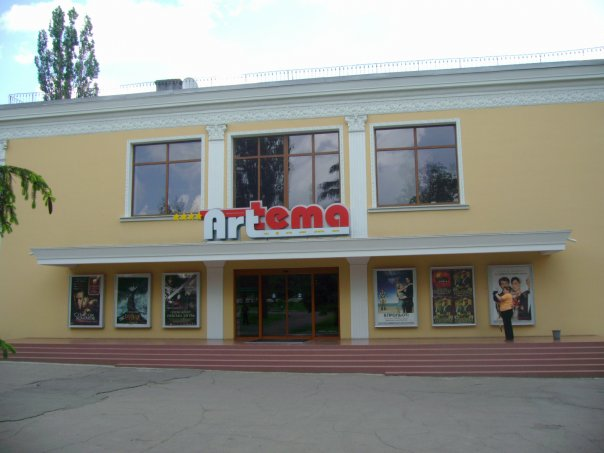
Artem Cinema

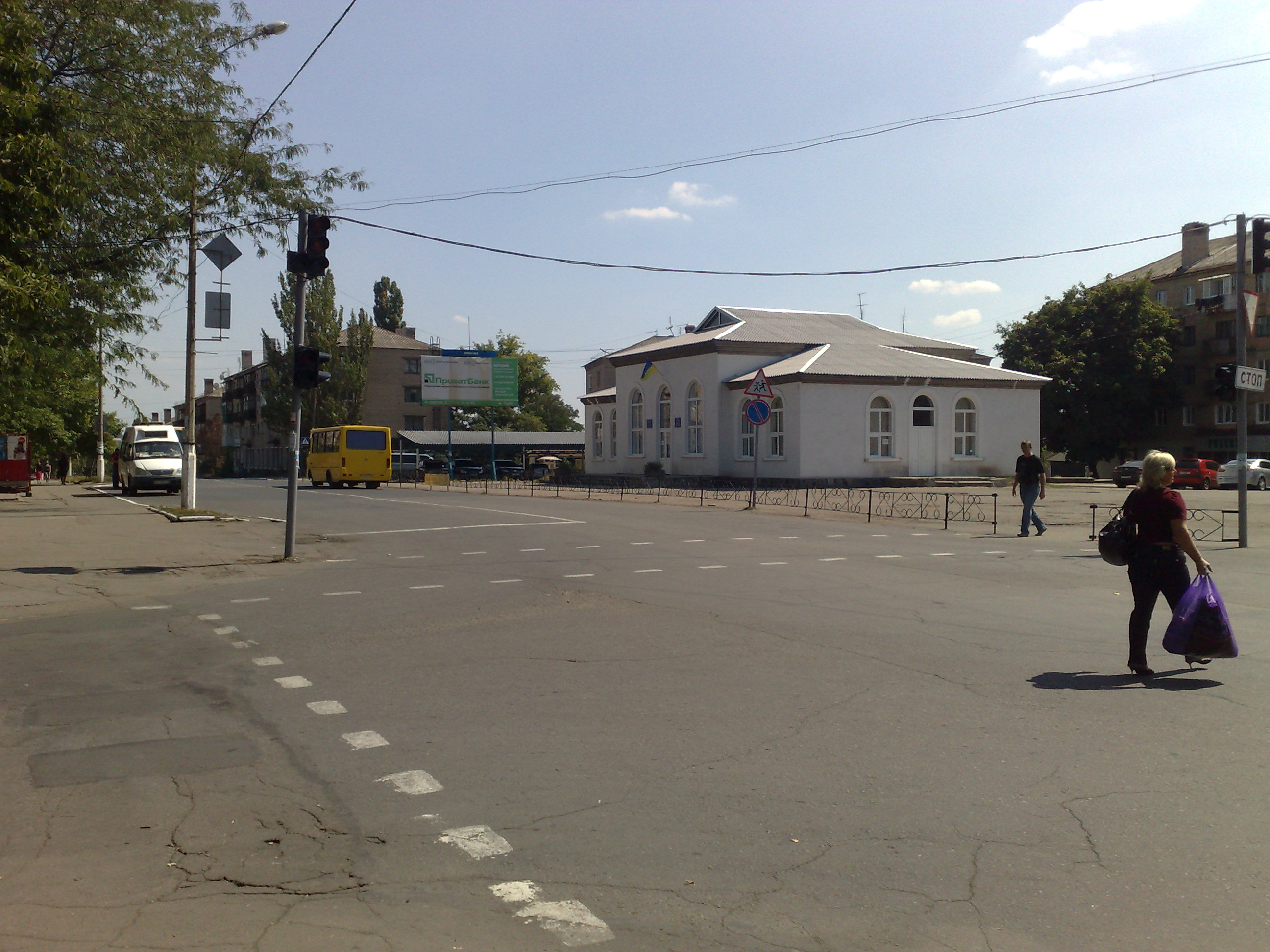
Intersection of Mykolaiv and Gagarin Streets

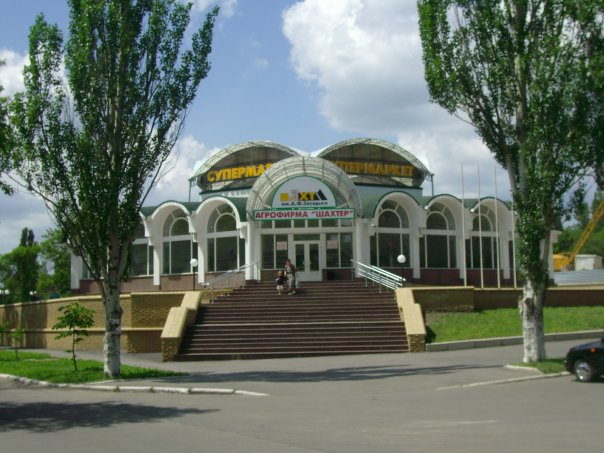
Shakhtar Supermarket on Engels Street

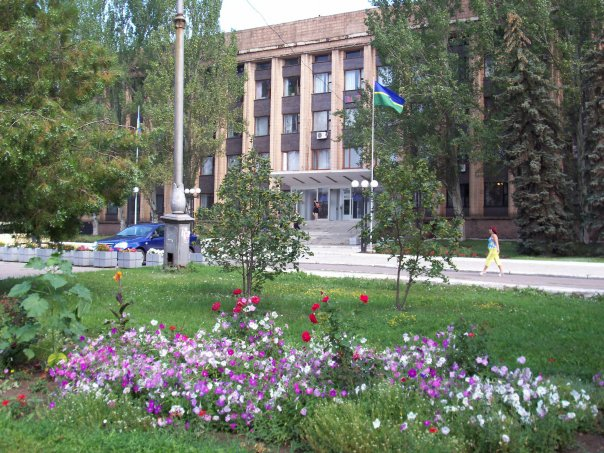
City Hall
