= Klimzowiec =

- Chorzów Settlement
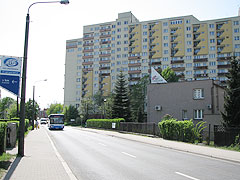
- Polish Army Avenue (Pl: Aleja Woj. Pol.)
- Interactive map of Klimzowiec
- Country: Poland
- Voivodeship: Silesian
- County/City: Chorzów
- Time zone: UTC+1 (CET)
  - Summer (DST): UTC+2 (CEST)
- Postal code: 41–500, 41–506, 41–516

Klimzowiec (German: Klimsawiese) is a historical district of Chorzów, which is now a part of the city's Centre district.

The settlement was established in the 19th century, specifically between the years 1850 and 1866, near a mill owned by the miller Klimzy.

In 1868, Klimsawiese became a part of Königshütte (now known as Chorzów).

Following the Upper Silesian Plebiscite and the Silesian uprisings in 1922, Klimsawiese, along with the rest of Königshütte (Polish: Królewska Huta, later renamed Chorzów in 1934), became a part of Poland.

== Sources ==
- "KLIMZOWIEC". mojchorzow.p. Retrieved 27 October 2020.
- "Chorzów – Klimzowiec". dziennikzachodni.pl. Retrieved 27 October 2020.
