= Pelahiivka, Donetsk Oblast =

Urban locality in Donetsk Oblast, Ukraine

Pelahiivka Пелагіївка
- Rural settlement
- Location of Pelahiivka Pelahiivka (Ukraine)
- Coordinates: 48°05′56″N 38°36′46″E
- Country: Ukraine
- Oblast: Donetsk Oblast
- Raion: Horlivka Raion
- Elevation: 321 m (1,053 ft)

Population (2022)
  - Total: 17,833
- Time zone: UTC+2
  - Summer (DST): UTC+3
- Postal code: 86606, 86608
- Area code: +380 6254

Pelahiivka (Ukrainian: Пелагіївка) is a rural settlement in Chystiakove urban hromada, Horlivka Raion, Donetsk Oblast, eastern Ukraine. Population: 17,833 (2022 estimate).

== Demographics ==
Native language as of the Ukrainian Census of 2001:

- Ukrainian 17.35%
- Russian 82.65%
- Belarusian 0.1%
- Armenian 0.03%
- Moldovan (Romanian), Bulgarian, German and Romanian (self-declared) 0.01%
