= Świętochłowice =

Świętochłowice Świyntochlowice (Silesian)
- City county
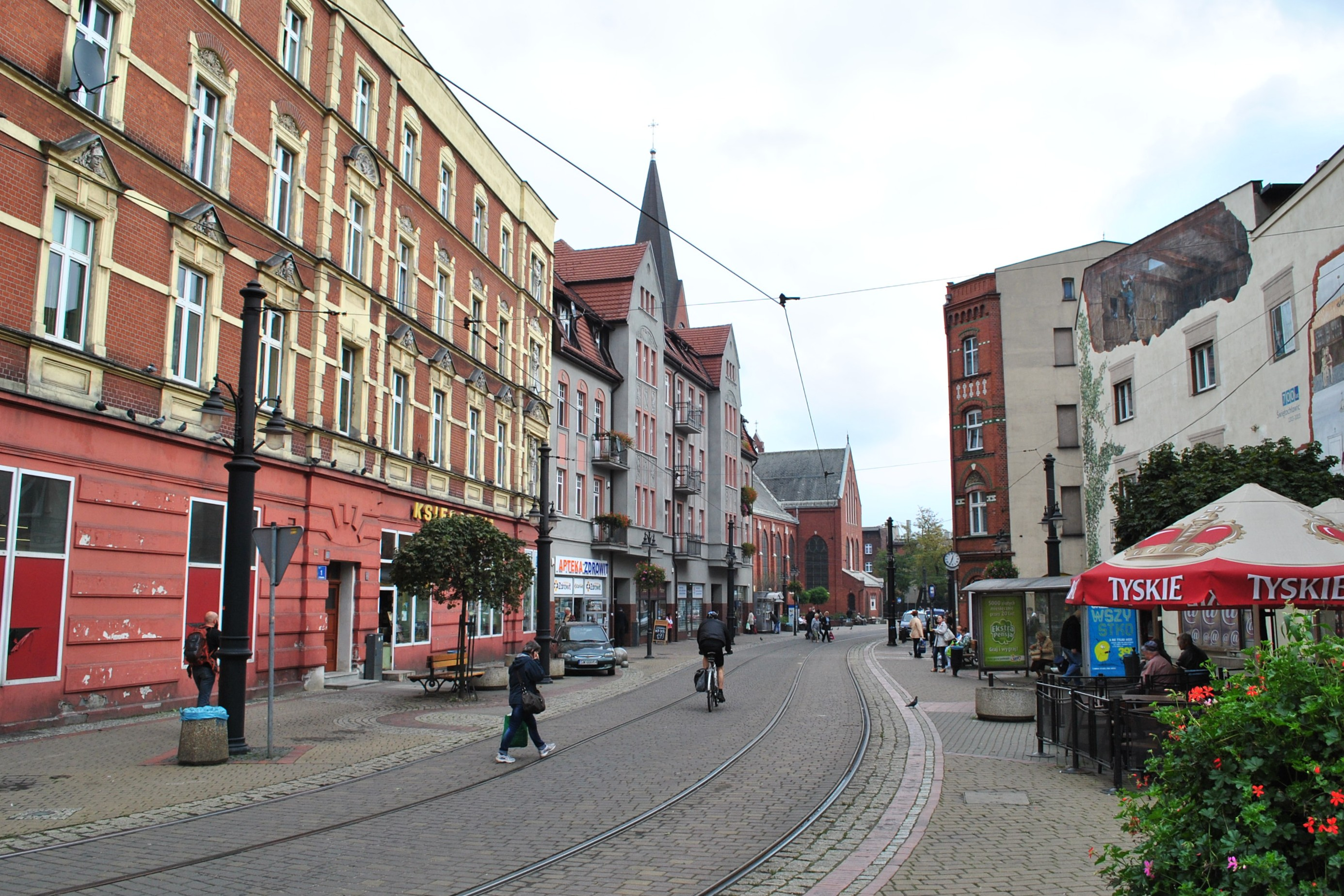
- Downtown

- Flag Coat of arms
- Interactive map of Świętochłowice
- Location within Poland Location within Silesian Voivodeship
- Coordinates: 50°17′31″N 18°55′04″E
- Country: Poland
- Voivodeship: Silesian
- County: city county
- Established: 12th century
- First mentioned: 1313
- City rights: 1947

Government
  - City mayor: Daniel Beger

Area
  - City county: 13.31 km^{2} (5.14 sq mi)

Population (2019-06-30)
  - City county: 49,762
  - Density: 3,739/km^{2} (9,683/sq mi)
  - Urban: 2,746,000
  - Metro: 4,620,624
- Time zone: UTC+1 (CET)
  - Summer (DST): UTC+2 (CEST)
- Postal code: 41-600 to 41-608
- Area code: +48 32
- Car plates: SW
- Primary airport: Katowice Airport
- Website: www.swietochlowice.pl

Świętochłowice (Polish: [ɕfjɛntɔxwɔˈvit͡sɛ]; Silesian: Świyntochłowice; German: Schwientochlowitz) is a city with powiat rights in Upper Silesia in southern Poland, near Katowice. It is also one of the central cities of the Metropolis GZM, with a population of 2 million, and is located in the Silesian Highlands, on the Rawa River (tributary of the Vistula).

It is situated in the Silesian Voivodeship since its formation in 1999, previously in Katowice Voivodeship, and before then, of the Autonomous Silesian Voivodeship. Świętochłowice is one of the cities of the 2.7 million conurbation – Katowice urban area and within a greater Katowice-Ostrava metropolitan area populated by about 5,294,000 people. The population of the city is 49,762 (2019).

== Location ==
Świętochłowice in the center of the Metropolis GZM.

Świętochłowice is situated in the middle of a highly populated area of Upper Silesia and is part of the Metropolis GZM, the largest urban center in Poland and one of the largest in Europe.

== History ==
Initially, Świętochłowice was divided into two parts: the older Małe Świętochłowice (Little Świętochłowice) and newer Duże Świętochłowice (Big Świętochłowice), which date back to the 12th and 13th centuries, respectively. The oldest known mention of Świętochłowice comes from 1313, while the present-day district of Chropaczów was mentioned in 1295. Both settlements were located within the Duchy of Bytom of fragmented Poland and remained under the rule of the Piast dynasty until 1532, as part of the duchies of Bytom and Opole, before passing to the Kingdom of Bohemia. The village received Magdeburg rights at the turn of the 13th and 14th centuries. Until the end of the 17th century, the village of Świętochłowice was owned by the families of Świętochłowski, Paczyński, Kamieński, Rotter, Skall, Myszkowski and Guznar.

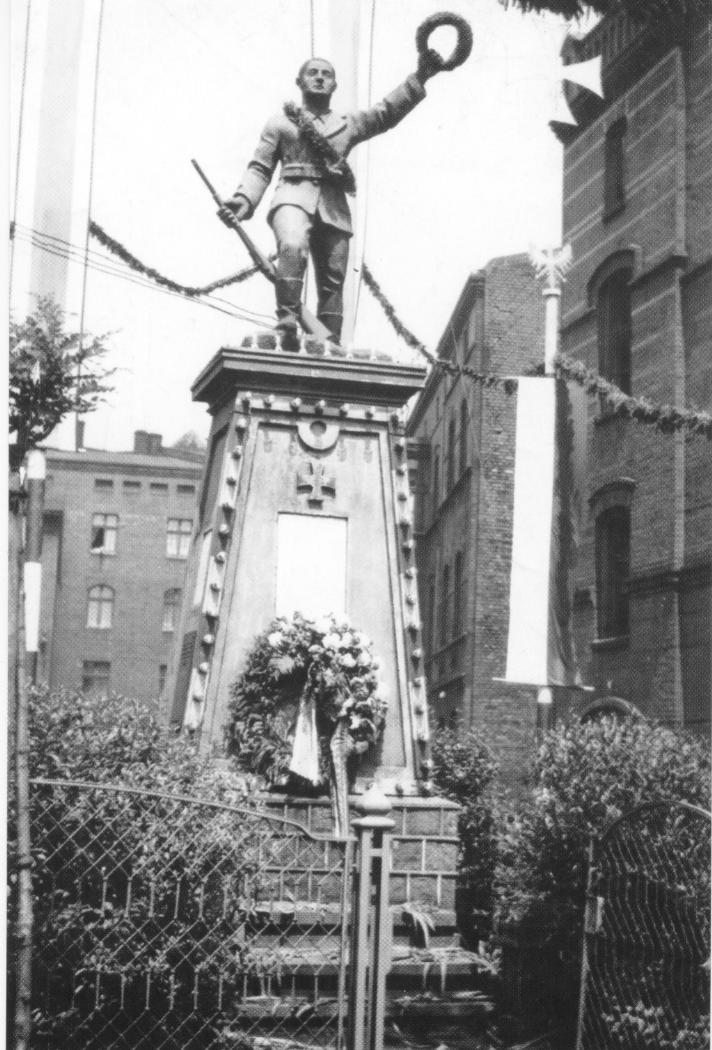
Pre-war Silesian Insurgent Monument, destroyed by the Germans during the occupation of Poland

In 1742 the settlement was annexed by Prussia and from 1871 to 1922 it was part of Germany. Both parts of Świętochłowice merged in 1790. In the 19th and first part of the 20th century the area rapidly industrialized (based on the numerous local resources, including coal and zinc), leading to the transformation of the village into an industrial settlement. In the early 20th century, numerous Polish organizations were established there. During the Silesian Uprisings the present-day districts Lipiny and Piaśniki were captured by the Polish insurgents in 1920. In the 1921 Upper Silesia plebiscite, in Świętochłowice 51.9% voted for Germany, while in Chropaczów 70.0% voted for Poland, and in Lipiny and Piaśniki combined 56.4% voted for Poland. In 1922 all named settlements were integrated with the re-established Polish state. In 1929 Zgoda became part of Świętochłowice as its new district. In 1939 Świętochłowice was granted city rights with effect from January 1, 1940, however, due to outbreak of World War II, the actual implementation of this law did not take place until 1947.

In early September 1939, during the German invasion of Poland which started World War II, Świętochłowice was the site of Polish defense, also by the civilian population. Already on September 3–4, 1939, Wehrmacht and Freikorps troops murdered 10 Poles in Świętochłowice (see Nazi crimes against the Polish nation). Afterwards, the town was occupied by Germany. In 1943, the Germans established the Eintrachthütte concentration camp, a forced labour subcamp of the Auschwitz concentration camp. In early 1945 it was occupied by the Soviets, who established the Zgoda labour camp.

After the war, Świętochłowice once again restored to Poland. In 1951 its city limits were extended with Chropaczów and Lipiny becoming new districts.

== Population ==
Currently (2013) Świętochłowice has about 53,000 inhabitants and is thus the city county with the highest population density in Poland. The population of the entire urban area is about 3.5 million.

== Climate and soil ==
Świętochłowice is situated in Silesian-Krakowian climate-zone. The annual precipitation totals to about 700 mm (28 in). The wettest month is July and the driest February. The average temperature is approximately −2.5 °C (27 °F) in January and 18 °C (64 °F) in July.

Brunate and swamp soils predominate in Świętochłowice.

== Districts ==
Subdivisions of Świętochłowice.

Świętochłowice has five administrative subdivisions:

- Centrum
- Chropaczów
- Lipiny
- Piaśniki
- Zgoda

== Sights ==
The Silesian Uprisings Museum, devoted to the history of the Silesian Uprisings (1919–1921), is located in Świętochłowice. In addition, the city has historical industrial architecture, town halls, churches, tenement houses and familoks.

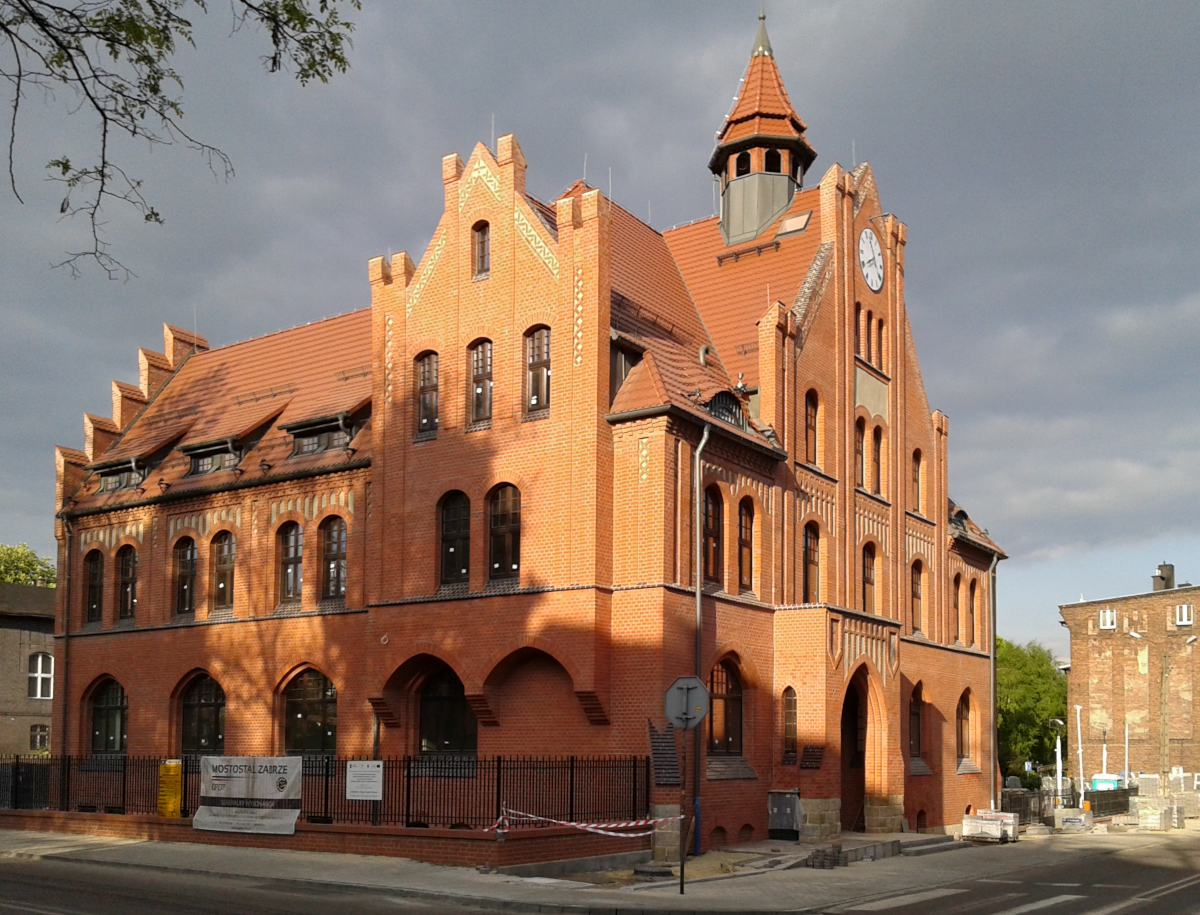
Silesian Uprisings Museum

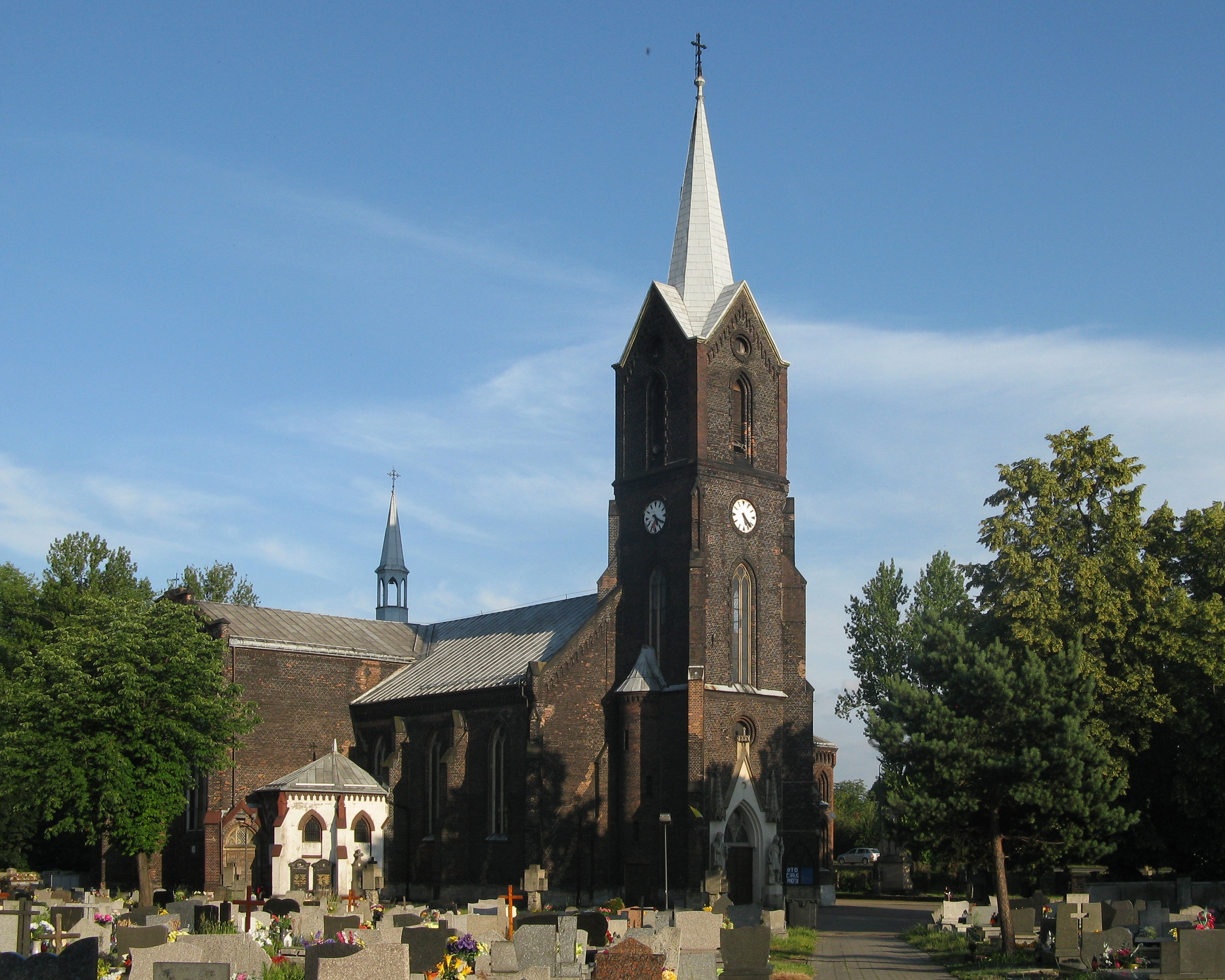
Saint Augustine church

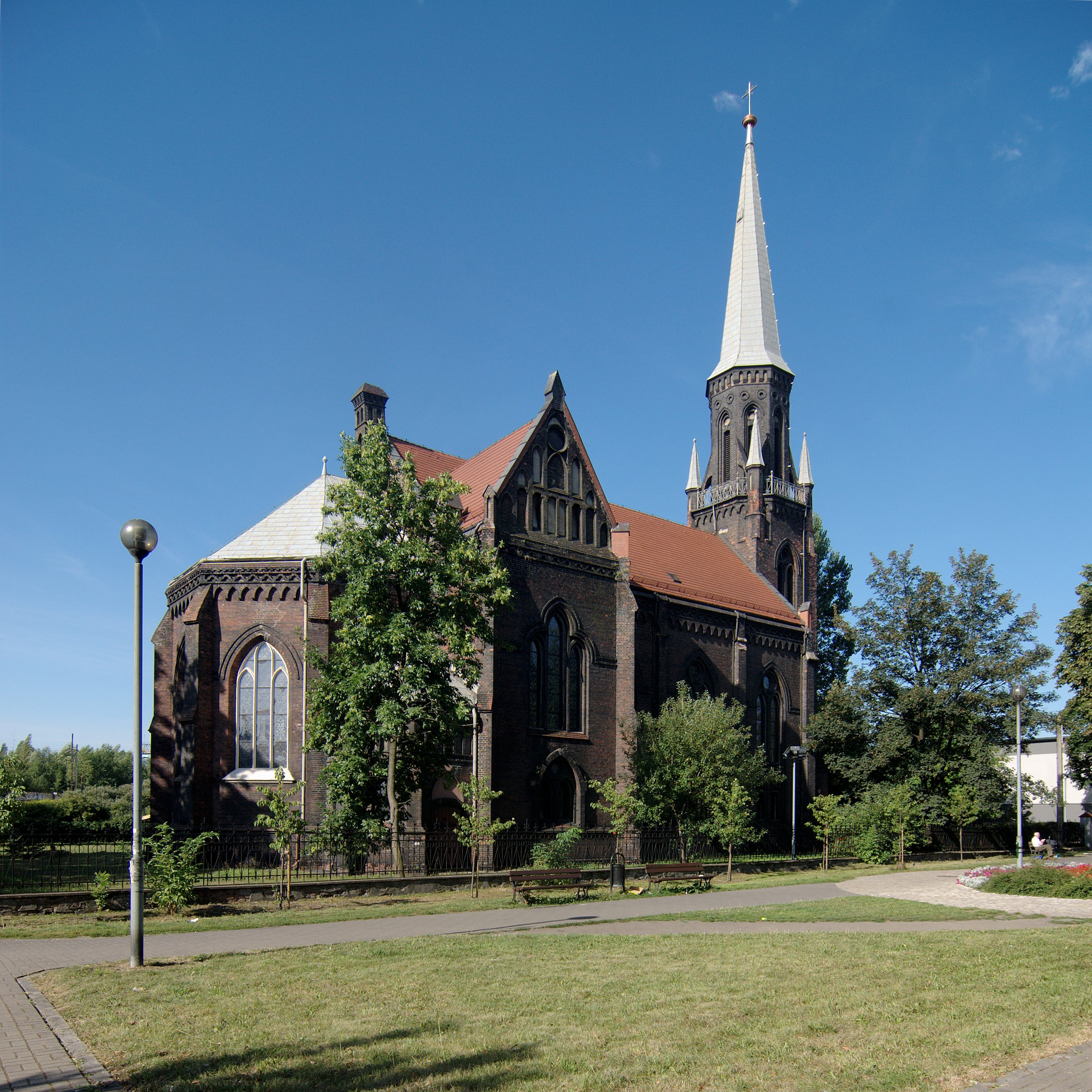
Church of St. John the Baptist

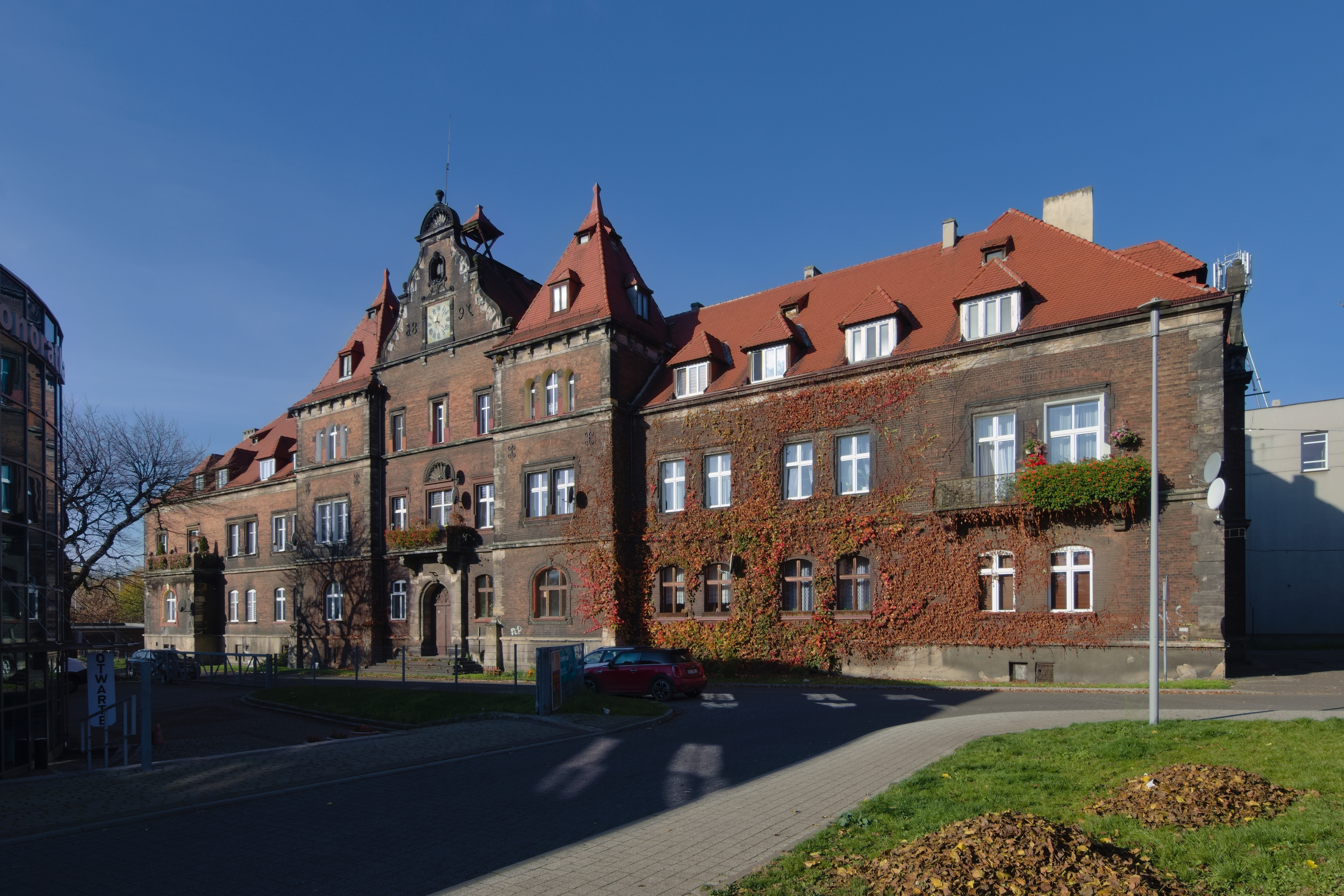
Former mine and steelwork headquarters

== Sport ==
The most popular sport in Świętochłowice is motorcycle speedway. The Skałka Stadium is located in the Centrum.

=== Sport clubs ===
- Śląsk Świętochłowice – football, speedway
- Naprzód Lipiny – football
- Czarni Świętochłowice – football

=== Sportspeople of Świętochłowice in Olympic Games ===
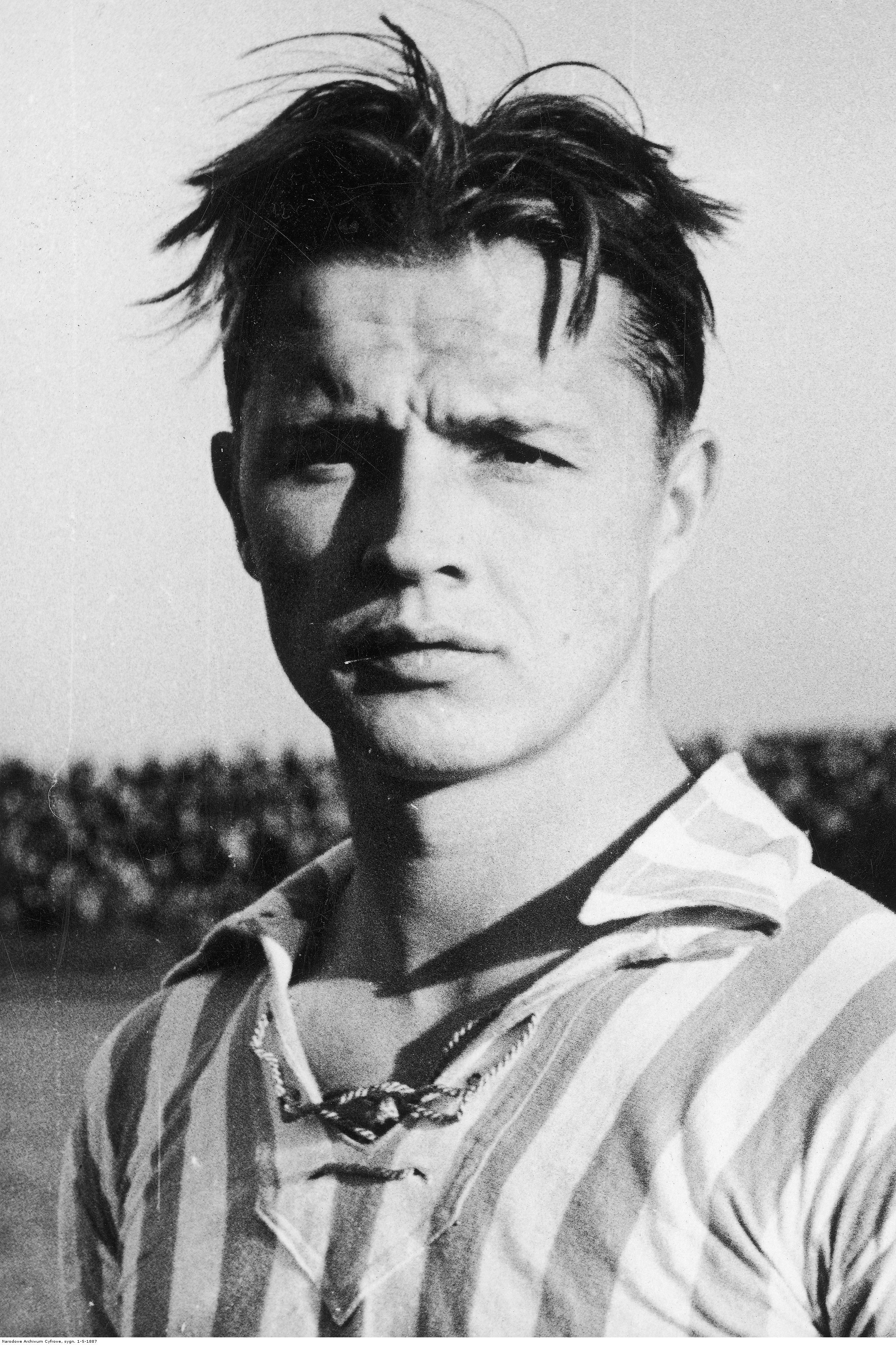
Teodor Peterek

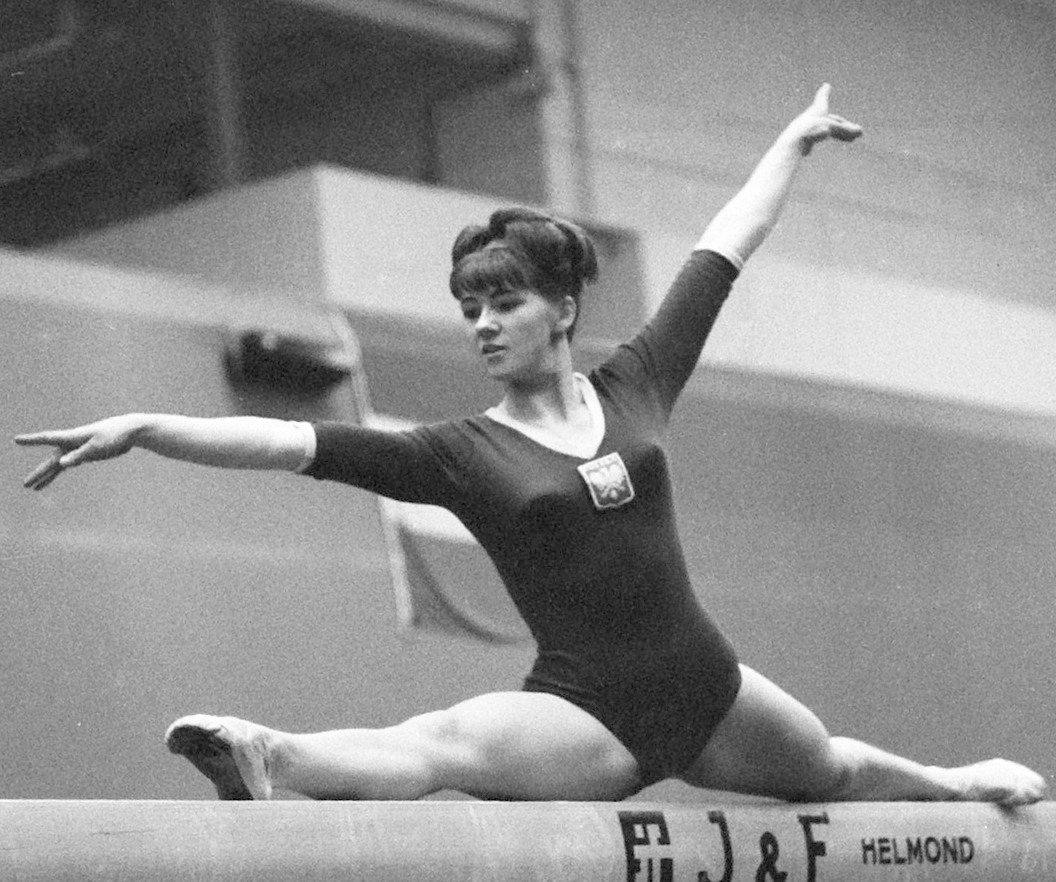
Gerda Bryłka

- 1928 – Amsterdam
  - football – Teodor Peterek
  - gymnastics – Paweł Galus, Franiciszek Pampuch, Teofil Rost, Franciszek Tajstra
- 1936 – Berlin
  - football – Hubert Gad, Ryszard Piec, Teodor Peterek
  - gymnastics – Klara Sierońska-Kostrzewa
- 1952 – Helsinki
  - football – Ewald Cebula
  - swimming – Gotfryd Gremlowski
- 1956 – Melbourne
  - gymnastics – Małgorzata Błaszczyk-Wasilewska
- 1960 – Rome
  - football – Roman Lentner
- 1964 – Tokyo
  - gymnastics – Gerda Bryłka-Krajciczek, Małgorzata Wilczek-Rogoń
- 1976 – Montreal
  - fencing – Barbara Wysoczańska
  - weightlifting – Leszek Skorupa
- 1976 – Innsbruck
  - ice-hockey – Kordian Jajszczok
- 1980 – Moscow
  - fencing – Barbara Wysoczańska

== Politics ==
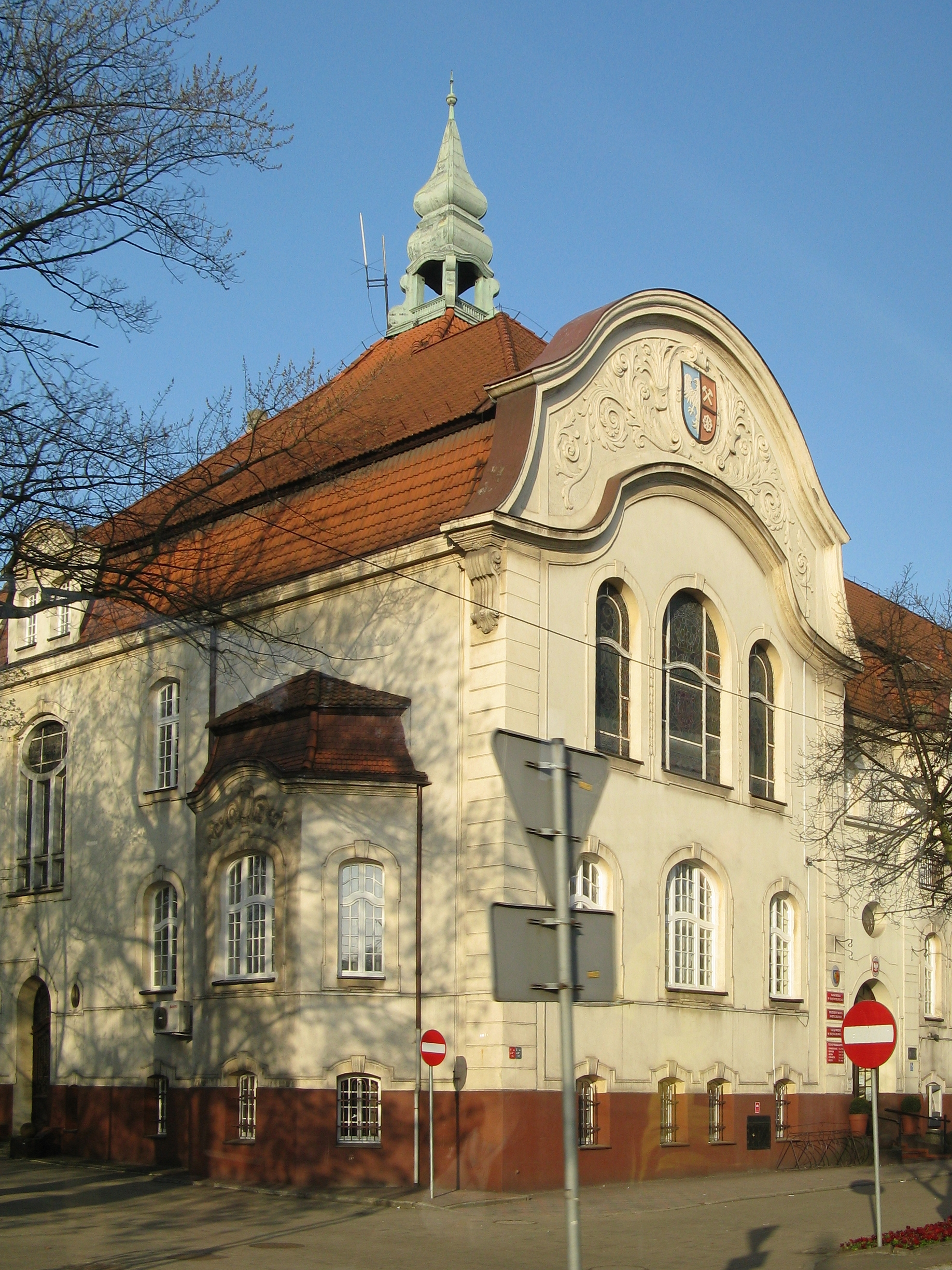
City Hall

The President of Świętochłowice is Daniel Beger. He was elected in 2018.

=== Twin towns – sister cities ===
Świętochłowice is twinned with:

- Chystiakove, Ukraine
- Heiloo, Netherlands
- Laa an der Thaya, Austria
- Nový Jičín, Czech Republic
- Rimavská Sobota, Slovakia
- Tai'an, China
- Tiszaújváros, Hungary

== Notable people ==
- Ewald Cebula (1917–2004), footballer
- Arthur Goldstein (1887–1943), German journalist and communist politician
- Krzysztof Hanke (born 1957), actor and satiris
- Salomon Morel (1919–2007), commandant of Zgoda labour camp
- Teodor Peterek (1910–1969), footballer
- Jacob Sonderling (1878–1964), German-American Rabbi
- Paweł Waloszek (1938–2018), motorcycle speedway rider
