= Chropaczów =

- Świętochłowice District
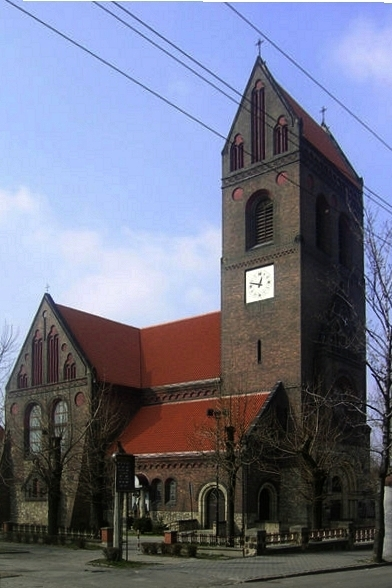
- Our Lady of the Rosary church

- Coat of arms

- Location of Chropaczów within Świętochłowice
- Coordinates: 50°18′47″N 18°54′54″E
- Country: Poland
- Voivodeship: Silesian
- County/City: Świętochłowice

Population (2013)
  - Total: 12,589
- Time zone: UTC+1 (CET)
  - Summer (DST): UTC+2 (CEST)
- Area code: (+48) 032

Chropaczów (between 1909 and 1922 German: Schlesiengrube) is a district in the north-east of Świętochłowice, Silesian Voivodeship, southern Poland. In 2013 it had a population of 12,589 people.

== History ==
The village was first mention in 1295 as Chropazcow. The village belonged initially to the Duchy of Bytom, a fee of the Kingdom of Bohemia, which after 1526 became a part of the Habsburg monarchy. After Silesian Wars the area became a part of the Kingdom of Prussia. In 1826 it was bought by Carl Lazarus Henckel von Donnersmarck. It was later industrialized. In 1879 the Lipiny Vorwerk became a separate municipality. In 1909 the municipality was renamed to Schlesiengrube, after a local coal mine.

After World War I in the Upper Silesia plebiscite 3,633 (including 1039 in Gutsbezirk) out of 5,423 voters (1480 in Gutsbezirk) in Schlesiengrube (Gemeinde and Gutsbezirk) voted in favour of joining Poland, against 1,784 opting for staying in Germany. Afterwards it became a part of Silesian Voivodeship, Second Polish Republic. It was then annexed by Nazi Germany at the beginning of World War II. After the war it was restored to Poland. The municipality of Chropaczów was amalgamated into Świętochłowice on 17 March 1951.
