= Divine Mercy Church, Prudnik =

Divine Mercy Church
- Kościół Miłosierdzia Bożego
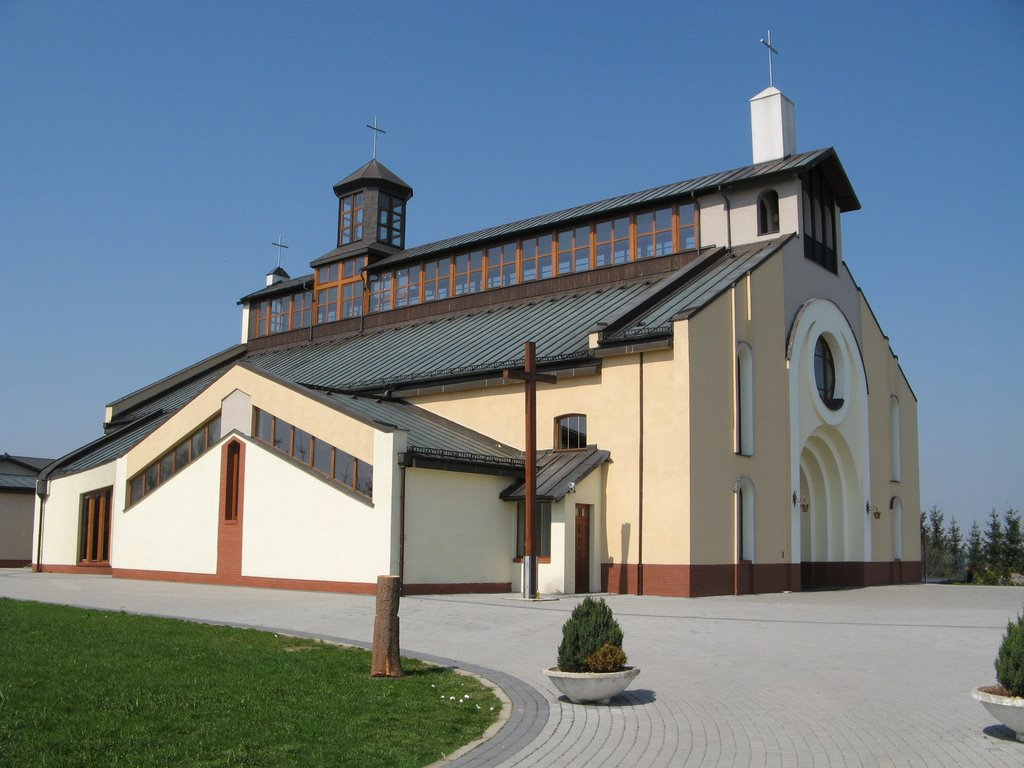
- Divine Mercy Church
- Divine Mercy Church
- Location: Prudnik
- Country: Poland
- Denomination: Roman Catholic
- Website: http://www.prudnik.org/

Architecture
- Groundbreaking: 1989

Specifications
- Materials: Brick

Administration
- Diocese: Roman Catholic Diocese of Opole

Divine Mercy Church in Prudnik, Poland, is a brick church, part of the Roman Catholic Diocese of Opole. It's located in the eastern part of town, in the Jasionowe Wzgórze residential area, at the 35 Aleksandra Skowrońskiego Street.

== History ==
The construction of the new catechetical house and monastery of the Dominican Order began on 4 September 1989. On 23 September 1989, Bishop Jan Wieczorek consecrated the cross and the place for construction. Before Christmas, a chapel was set up. On 20 October 1996, the foundation stone was solemnly laid by Bishop Alfons Nossol.

== See also ==
- Saints Peter and Paul Church, Prudnik
- St. Michael's Church, Prudnik
- St. Joseph Church, Prudnik
