= Waldemar Musioł =

Polish Roman Catholic bishop (born 1977)

Most Reverend Waldemar Musioł
- Titular Bishop of Bagis, Auxiliary bishop of Opole
- Church: Catholic Church
- Diocese: Opole
- Appointed: 29 October 2022

Orders
- Ordination: 2 June 2001 by Alfons Nossol
- Consecration: 10 December 2022 by Andrzej Czaja, Salvatore Pennacchio, Wiktor Skworc

Personal details
- Born: Waldemar Musioł; 10 November 1976 (age 49) Krapkowice, Poland
- Residence: Opole, Poland
- Education: University of Opole
- Motto: Patris corde amare
- Coat of arms

Waldemar Musioł (born 10 November 1976) is a Polish Roman Catholic prelate, who has serving as an auxiliary bishop of the Diocese of Opole and a titular bishop of Bagis since 2022.

== Early life and education ==
Waldemar Musioł was born on 10 November 1976 in Krapkowice. He completed his philosophical and theological studies at the Faculty of Theology of the University of Opole, obtaining a Master's degree in 2003. He was ordained a priest on 2 June 2001 by Bishop Alfons Nossol for his native Diocese.

In 2005, he earned a Licentiate in Theology from the same university.

== Priesthood ==
Following his ordination, Musioł served as a vicar at the parish of St. Peter and Paul in Gliwice (2003–2005) and the parish of Blessed Czesław in Opole (2005–2006). Between 2006 and 2009, he was a member of the pastoral department of the Diocesan Curia of Opole. In 2009, he was appointed director of the same department.

Within the diocesan structures, he also served as a member of the College of Consultors and the Diocesan Council for the Management of Church Property. He was the coordinator for the local implementation of the Synod of Bishops on Synodality (2021–2023).

== Episcopal ministry ==
On 29 October 2022, Pope Francis appointed him auxiliary bishop of the Diocese of Opole, assigning him the titular see of Bagis. He received his episcopal consecration on 10 December 2022 at the Seminary and Academic Church of St. Jadwiga of Silesia in Opole. The principal consecrator was Bishop Andrzej Czaja, assisted by the Apostolic Nuncios to Poland, Archbishop Salvatore Pennacchio and Bishop Wiktor Skworc.
