= Andrzej Czaja =

Polish Roman Catholic bishop (born 1963)

Most Reverend Andrzej Konrad Czaja
- Bishop of Opole
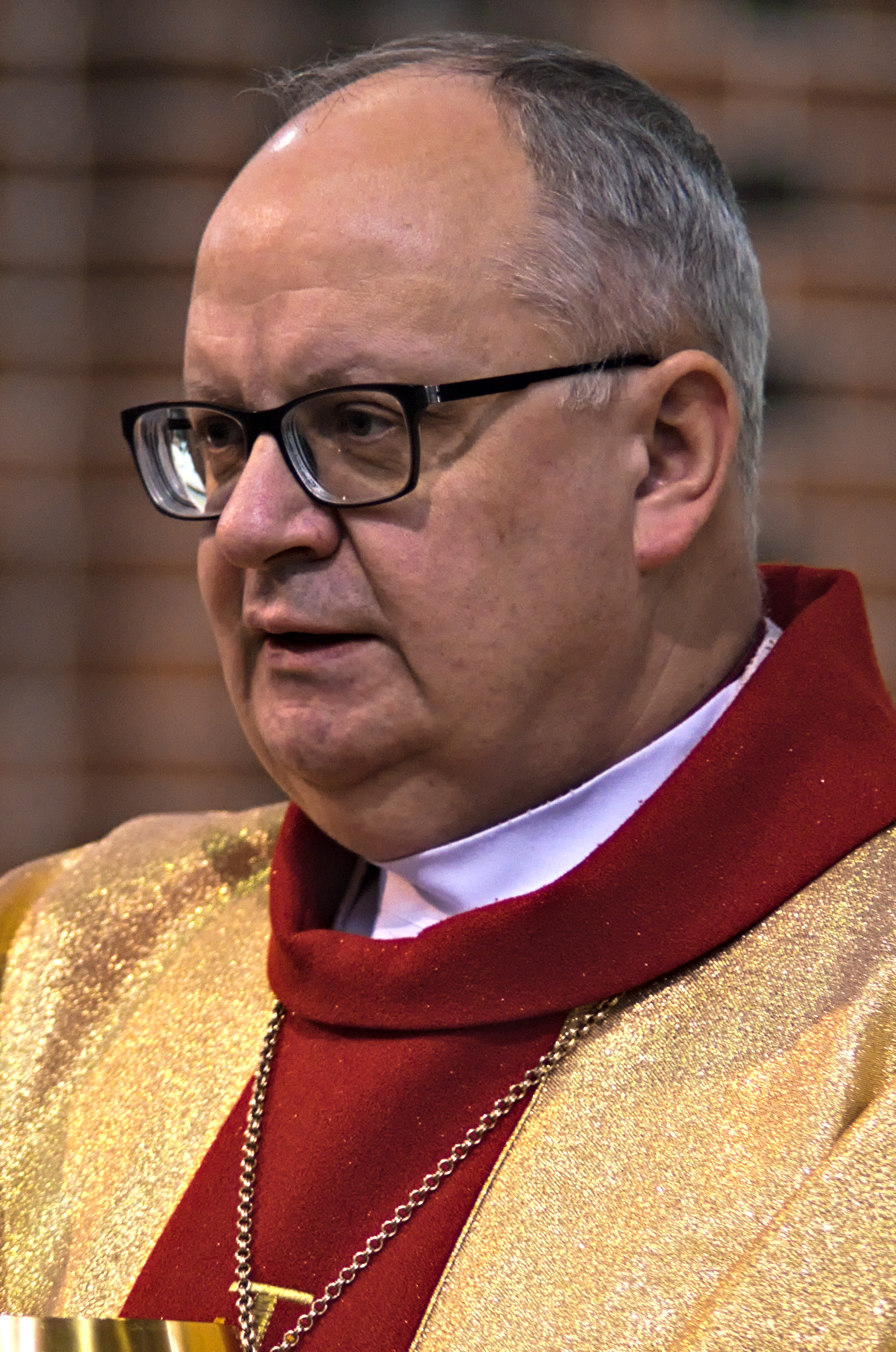
- Czaja in 2020
- Province: Katowice
- Diocese: Opole
- Appointed: 14 August 2009
- Predecessor: Alfons Nossol

Orders
- Ordination: 11 May 1988 by Jan Bagiński
- Consecration: 29 August 2009 by Alfons Nossol, Damian Zimoń, Jan Wieczorek

Personal details
- Born: Andrzej Konrad Czaja; 12 December 1963 (age 62) Olesno, Poland
- Education: Major Theological Seminary in Nysa, Catholic University of Lublin
- Motto: Astare coram Te et Tibi ministrare
- Coat of arms

Andrzej Konrad Czaja (born 12 December 1963) is a Polish Roman Catholic prelate, who has served as the Bishop of Opole since 2009. A noted theologian, he previously held academic positions at the Catholic University of Lublin and the University of Opole.

== Early life and education ==
Andrzej Czaja was born in Olesno. He attended the Minor Seminary in Gliwice before entering the Major Theological Seminary in Nysa. He was ordained to the priesthood on 11 May 1988 by Bishop Alfons Nossol.

He continued his studies at the Catholic University of Lublin (KUL), where he specialized in dogmatic theology. In 1994, he obtained his doctorate with a thesis on the pneumatological dimension of the Church in the teachings of Heribert Mühlen. He later completed his habilitation in 2003.

== Academic and priestly career ==
Before his episcopal appointment, Czaja was deeply involved in academia. He served as a professor at KUL and the University of Opole, focusing on ecumenism and ecclesiology. From 2003 to 2009, he was the head of the Department of Ecumenical Theology at KUL.

== Episcopal ministry ==
On 14 August 2009, Pope Benedict XVI appointed Czaja as the Bishop of Opole, following the retirement of Archbishop Alfons Nossol. He was consecrated on 29 August 2009 in the Cathedral of the Holy Cross in Opole. His principal consecrator was his predecessor, Alfons Nossol, assisted by Archbishop Damian Zimoń and Bishop Jan Wieczorek.

Within the Polish Episcopal Conference, Czaja has served as the Chairman of the Commission for the Doctrine of the Faith and as a member of the Permanent Council.
