= Gerard Alfons Kusz =

Polish priest (1939–2021)

Gerard Kusz
- Titular Bishop of Tagarbala
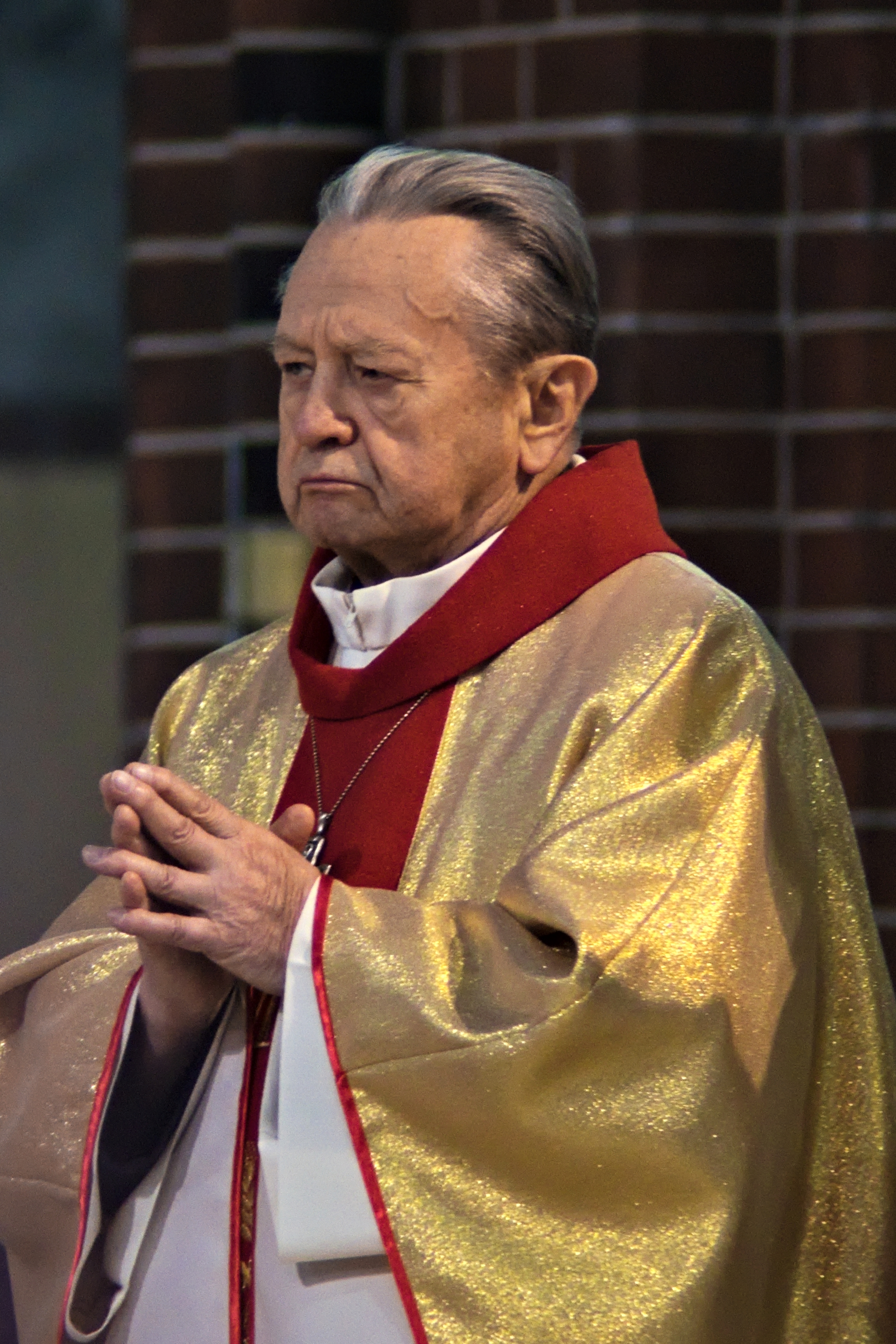
- Gerard Kusz in 2020
- In office: 8 July 1985 – 15 March 2021
- Predecessor: Eduardo André Muaca
- Successor: Joseph A. Espaillat
- Other posts: Auxiliary Bishop of Gliwice (1992–2014); Auxiliary Bishop of Opole (1985–1992)

Orders
- Ordination: 24 June 1962 by Franciszek Jop
- Consecration: 15 August 1985 by Józef Glemp

Personal details
- Born: 23 August 1939 Oderwalde, Province of Silesia, Prussia, German Empire (now Dziergowice, Poland)
- Died: 15 March 2021 (aged 81) Gliwice, Poland
- Denomination: Catholicism

Gerard Alfons Kusz (23 October 1939 – 15 March 2021) was a Polish Roman Catholic prelate. He was auxiliary bishop of Opole (1985–1992) and Gliwice (1992–2014).

He was also Titular Bishop of Tagarbala from 1985 to his death.
