= Patryk Jaki =

Polish politician (born 1985)

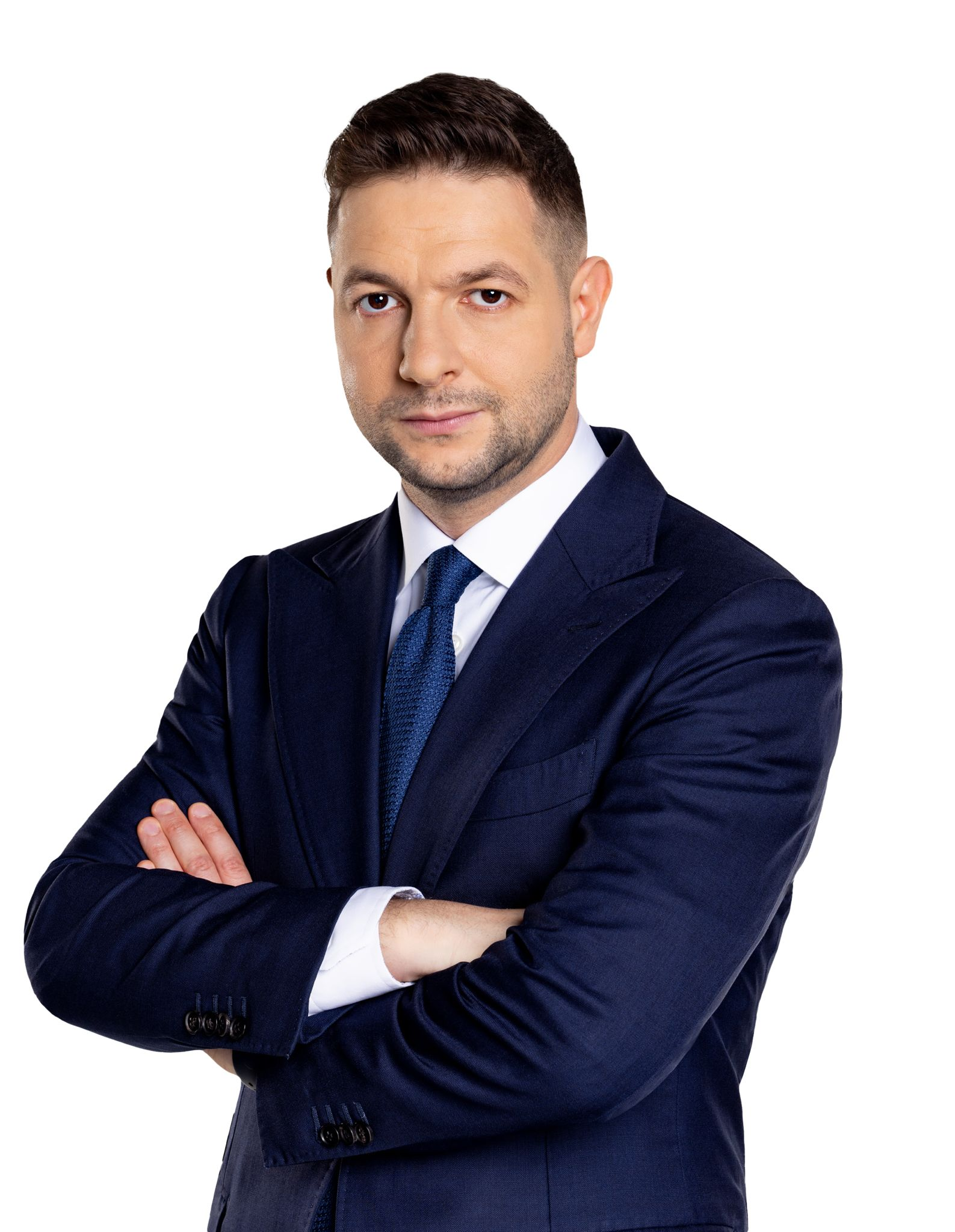
- Jaki in 2023

Member of the European Parliament
- Incumbent
- Assumed office 2 July 2019

Personal details
- Born: 11 May 1985 (age 41) Opole, Poland
- Party: Law and Justice (Vice-President of the party since 2024)
- Spouse: Anna Jaki
- Children: 2
- Education: University of Wrocław

Patryk Tomasz Jaki (born 11 May 1985) is a Polish politician, sitting as a Member of the European Parliament since 2019. He currently serves as Co-Chair of the European Conservatives and Reformists Group in the European Parliament, and has been vice-president of the Law and Justice party since 2024.

He was previously a member of the Sejm, the lower house of the parliament of Poland, in the VII and VIII terms (2011–2019). He served as Secretary of State in the Ministry of Justice (2015–2019) and has been the vice-chairman of the Euronest Parliamentary Assembly since 2019.

== Biography ==
=== Education ===
Jaki graduated from the University of Wrocław and obtained a master's degree in political science in 2010. He also completed the ARGO Top Public Executive program organized by the National School of Public Administration in collaboration with IESE Business School in Barcelona (2018), and training at Sam Houston State University in Huntsville, Texas. In 2019, he defended his doctoral dissertation at the Faculty of National Security of the War Studies University. He conducted classes for students at Opole University in the security policy workshop.

=== Political career ===
In 2003, he joined the Youth Forum of Law and Justice (PiS). He worked, among other positions, as a marketing specialist at the International School of Logistics and Transport. He published in the journal Logistyka (Logistics). He was a member of the political cabinet of the Opole Voivode, an assistant to MEP Ryszard Legutko, and a member of the "Gazeta Polska" club in Opole. He also served as the vice-president of the "Stop Corruption" Association.

In 2006, he joined Civic Platform and was elected to Opole City Council on its slate, before leaving shortly after the election to rejoin PiS. In 2009, he completed his political science studies at the Faculty of Social Sciences at the University of Wrocław. In 2010, he was re-elected in the local government elections and became chair of the Law and Justice councillors' group that same year.

On 18 November 2015, Jaki was appointed Secretary of State in the Ministry of Justice, which included responsibility for the prison service. He was also appointed Plenipotentiary of the Minister of Justice for the Implementation of the Electronic Monitoring System. He drafted an amendment to the existing law to prohibit depriving parents of custody of their children on grounds of their bad financial situation. He was put in charge of the establishment of the Museum of Cursed Soldiers and Political Prisoners of the Polish People's Republic. He also chaired the Team for the Protection of Family Autonomy and Family Life in the Ministry of Justice.

Jaki initiated the establishment of the Verification Committee for Reprivatisation, and became its chair on 11 May 2017. He established a Polish registry of sex offenders since 1 October of the same year, as well as a government programme for the employment of prisoners which has helped to increase employment among convicts by 50%.

Jaki was the chairman of the Polish Council of Penitentiary Policy. He stated that "stopping Islamization is his Westerplatte".

On 11 October 2017, Jaki received the "Polski Kompas" (Poland's Compass) award granted by the Gazeta Bankowa monthly for his "fight against a reprivatisation mafia".

==== Later career ====
Jaki gained almost 260,000 votes in the 2019 European Parliament election in Poland. He is responsible for the "Save the Heroes" campaign promoting the restoration of streets named in honor of generals Emil August Fieldorf "Nil" and Zygmunt Szendzielarz "Łupaszka”, as well as the legislation initiative "Let's Restore History Lessons at Schools”

== Awards ==
- 10th place on the list of 50 most influential Poles in 2017, published in the weekly "Wprost"
- Polish Compass Award, awarded on 11 October 2017 by "Gazeta Bankowa" for "fighting the reprivatization mafia"
- Title of "Man of the Year 2017" in the Opole voivodeship, in the plebiscite of "Nowa Trybuna Opolska", for effectively attracting large investments to the region
- 10th place on the list of 50 most influential Poles in 2018, published in the weekly "Wprost"

== Personal life ==
Jaki was born in Opole.

On 14 September 2013, Jaki married Anna Kuszkiewicz (in Cathedral Basilica of the Holy Cross, Opole). They have a son named Radosław, who was born with Down syndrome in 2014, and a daughter named Aleksandra (b. 2020).

Political offices
Preceded by Jerzy Kozdroń	First Deputy Minister of Justice; 2015–present	Incumbent
