= Jan Wieczorek =

Polish Roman Catholic prelate (1935–2023)

His Excellency Jan Walenty Wieczorek
- Bishop Emeritus of Gliwice
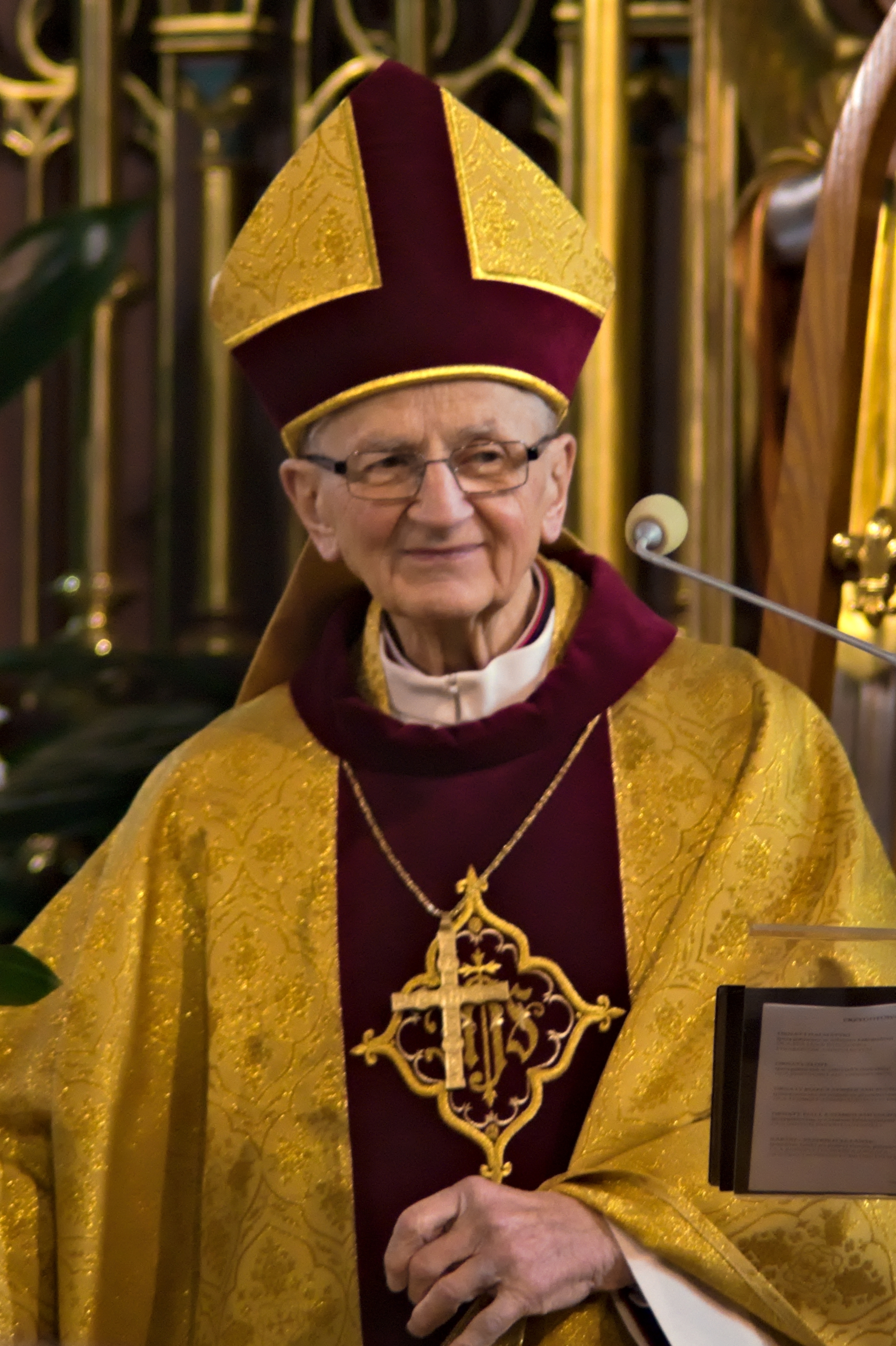
- Jan Wieczorek in 2020
- Metropolis: Katowice
- Appointed: 25 March 1992
- Term ended: 29 December 2011
- Predecessor: First
- Successor: Jan Kopiec
- Previous posts: Auxiliary Bishop of Opole and Titular Bishop of Thimida Regia (1981–1992)

Orders
- Ordination: 22 June 1958 by Franciszek Jop
- Consecration: 16 August 1981 by Alfons Nossol

Personal details
- Born: 8 February 1935 Bodzanowice, Poland
- Died: 13 September 2023 (aged 88)

Jan Walenty Wieczorek (8 February 1935 – 13 September 2023) was a Polish Roman Catholic prelate. He was auxiliary bishop of Opole from 1981 to 1992 and bishop of Gliwice from 1992 to 2011.

Catholic Church titles
Preceded by First	Bishop of Gliwice; 1992–2011	Succeeded by Jan Kopiec
Preceded by Joseph Hubert Hart	Titular Bishop of Thimida Regia; 1981–1992	Succeeded by Dorick McGowan Wright
Preceded by —	Auxiliary Bishop of Opole; 1981–1992	Succeeded by —
