= Wanda Lewis =

Polish-British civil engineer

Wanda Jadwiga Lewis is a Polish-British civil engineer known for her work on the design of tensile structures, including nature-inspired stress-resilient forms for arch bridges. She is an emeritus professor of civil engineering at the University of Warwick.

== Education and career ==
Lewis is originally from Opole, in Poland. After earning diplomas in economics and engineering at the University of Opole, and a master's degree at the University of Birmingham, Lewis earned a PhD in 1982 at the University of Wolverhampton, as the only research assistant at the university, under the auspices of the Council for National Academic Awards.

After working as a schoolteacher and as a borough council structural engineer, she joined the Warwick faculty in 1986. She became the first woman in the Warwick civil engineering department to be promoted as a reader and a professor.

== Book ==
Lewis is the author of the book Tension Structures: Form and Behavior (Thomas Telford, 2003; 2nd ed., ICE Publishing, 2018).

== Recognition ==
Lewis is a Fellow of the Institution of Civil Engineers in 2004, and a Fellow of the Royal Society of Arts in 2020.
