= Diocese of Gliwice =

Roman Catholic diocese in Poland

Coordinates: 50.2913°N 18.6655°E

Diocese of Gliwice Dioecesis Glivicensis Diecezja Gliwicka

Catholic
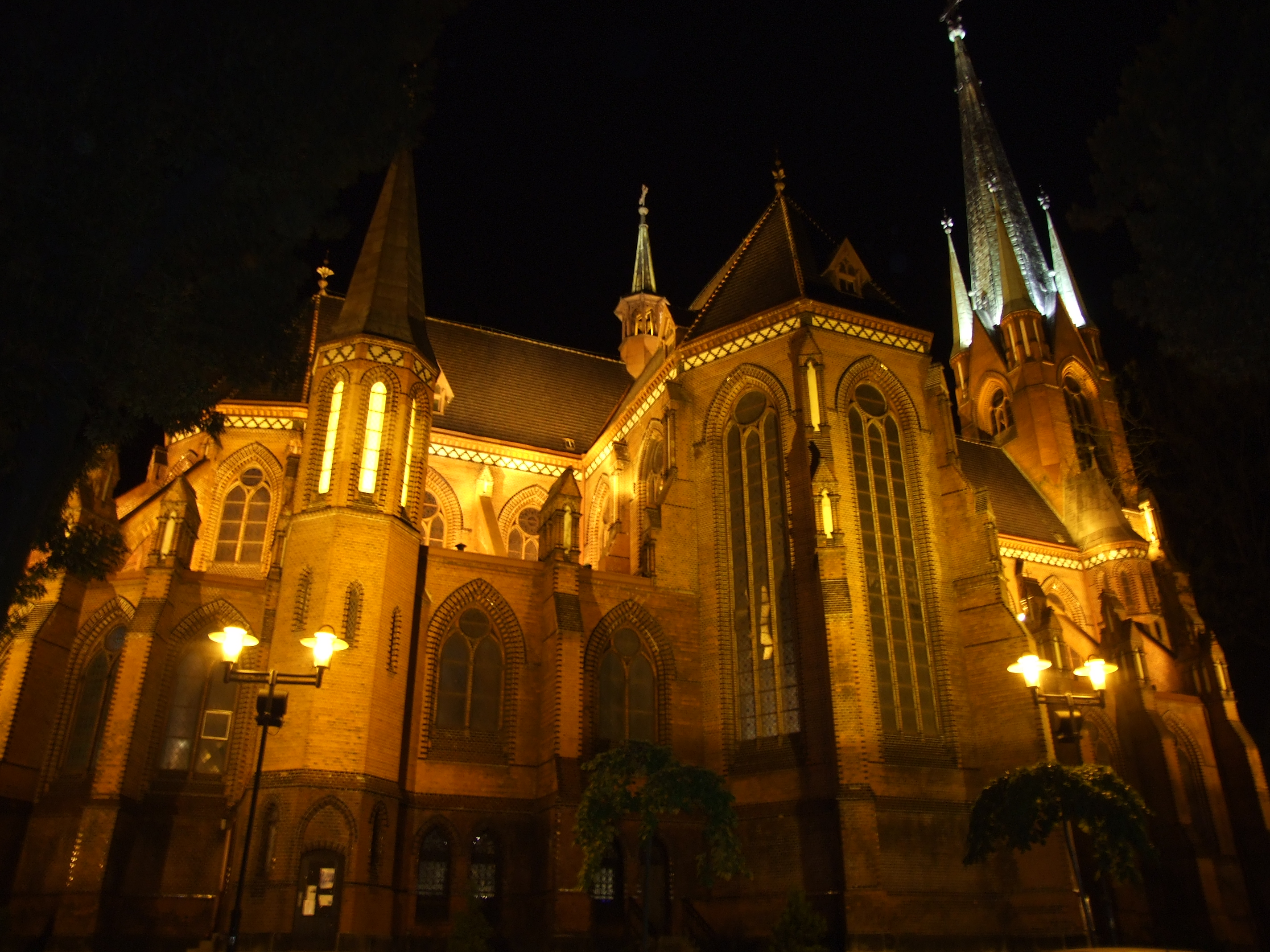
- Cathedral of Sts. Peter and Paul in Gliwice

Location
- Country: Poland
- Metropolitan: Katowice

Statistics
- Area: 2,250 km^{2} (870 sq mi)
- Population: Total; Catholics: (as of 2021); 658,377; 587,763 (89.3%)

Information
- Denomination: Catholic Church
- Sui iuris church: Latin Church
- Rite: Roman Rite
- Cathedral: Sts. Peter and Paul Cathedral, Gliwice

Current leadership
- Pope: Leo XIV
- Bishop: Sławomir Oder
- Metropolitan Archbishop: Sede vacante
- Auxiliary Bishops: Andrzej Iwanecki
- Bishops emeritus: Jan Kopiec

Website
- www.kuria.gliwice.pl

Map of Roman Catholic Diocese of Gliwice

The Diocese of Gliwice (Latin: Glivicen(sis)) is a Latin Church ecclesiastical territory or diocese of the Catholic Church in Poland. Its episcopal see is located in the city of Gliwice. The Diocese of Gliwice is a suffragan diocese in the ecclesiastical province of the Archdiocese of Katowice. As of 2021, about 89% of the population in the territory of the diocese is self-described Catholic, however only 39% are practising Catholics.

== History ==
- March 25, 1992: Established as Diocese of Gliwice from the Diocese of Częstochowa, Diocese of Katowice, and the Diocese of Opole

== Leadership ==
- Bishops of Gliwice
  - Bishop Jan Walenty Wieczorek (March 25, 1992 – December 29, 2011)
  - Bishop Jan Kopiec (December 29, 2011 – January 28, 2023)
  - Bishop Sławomir Oder (since February 11, 2023)
- Auxiliary bishops of Gliwice
  - Bishop Gerard Kusz (March 25, 1992 – November 15, 2014)
  - Bishop Andrzej Iwanecki (since January 7, 2018)

== See also ==
- Roman Catholicism in Poland

== Sources ==
- GCatholic.org
- Catholic Hierarchy
- Diocese website
