= Jan Bagiński =

Polish Roman Catholic bishop (1932–2019)

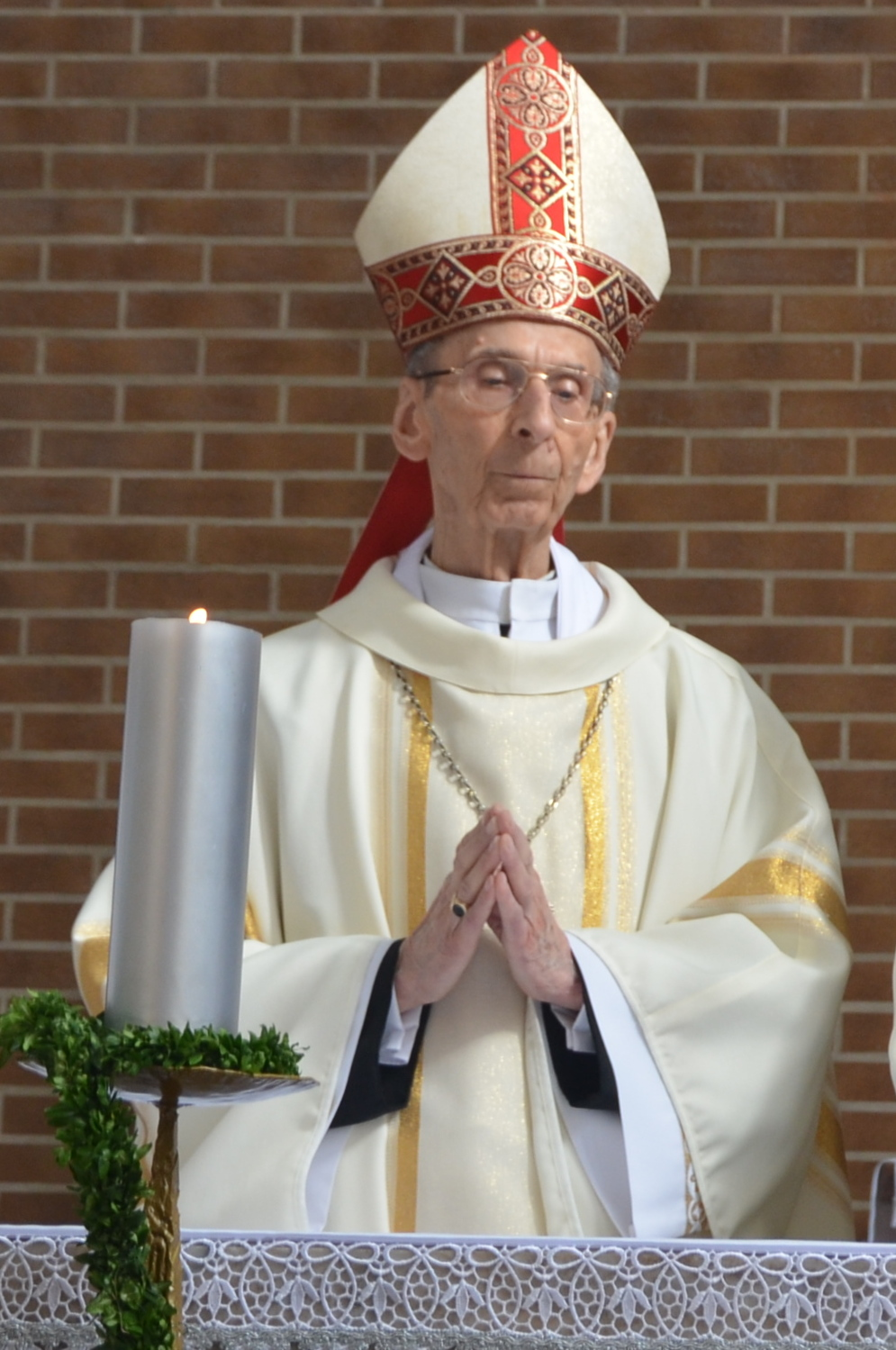

Jan Bagiński (31 May 1932 – 19 May 2019) was a Polish Roman Catholic bishop.

Bagiński was born in Poland and was ordained to the priesthood in 1956. He served as titular bishop of Tagarata and as auxiliary bishop of the Roman Catholic Diocese of Opole, Poland, from 1985 to 2009.
