= Gliwice Cathedral =

Coordinates: 50.2913°N 18.6655°E

- Sts. Peter and Paul Cathedral
- Katedra św. Apostołów Piotra i Pawła
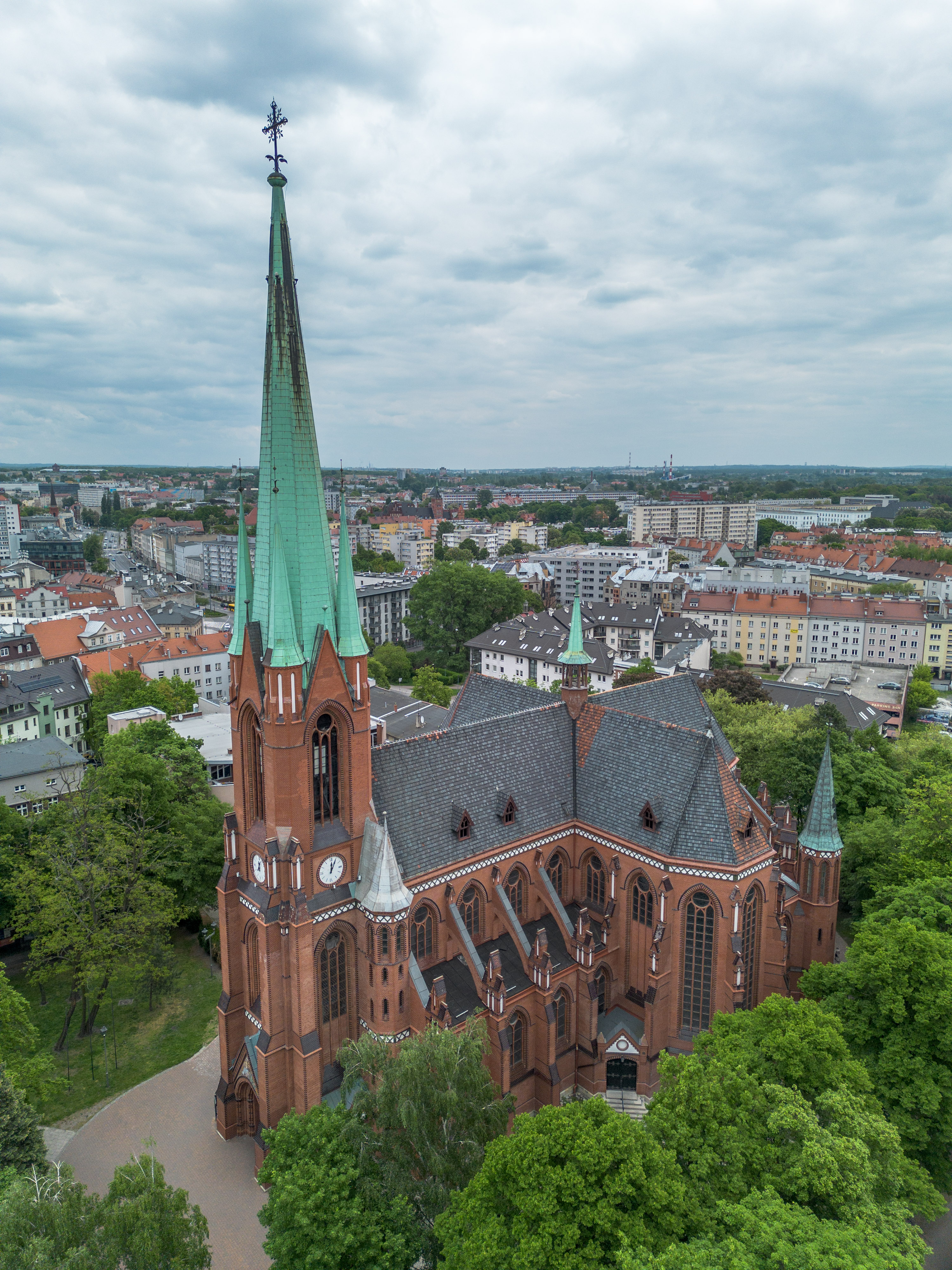
- Gliwice Cathedral
- Location: Gliwice
- Country: Poland
- Denomination: Roman Catholic Church

Administration
- Diocese: Roman Catholic Diocese of Gliwice

The Sts. Peter and Paul Cathedral (Polish: Katedra św. Apostołów Piotra i Pawła) also called Gliwice Cathedral is the name given to a Catholic church that serves as the cathedral of Gliwice, Poland, in the central district of the city.

The church was built between 1896 and 1900 and was initially a subsidiary of the parish church of All Saints. In 1908 the parish of St. Peter and Paul was erected, and its first parish priest was Józef Jagło.

Its bells were confiscated in 1917 during the First World War. Between 1934 and 1936 it was renovated and repaired. In January 1945 it suffered from the Soviet bombardment of German positions during World War II; damages were repaired soon after (1945–1946). Local authorities renewed the structure again in 2009.

In 1992, Pope John Paul II established the Diocese of Gliwice, and the parish church of St. Peter and Paul was elevated to the dignity of a cathedral.

== See also ==
- Roman Catholicism in Poland
- Sts. Peter and Paul Cathedral

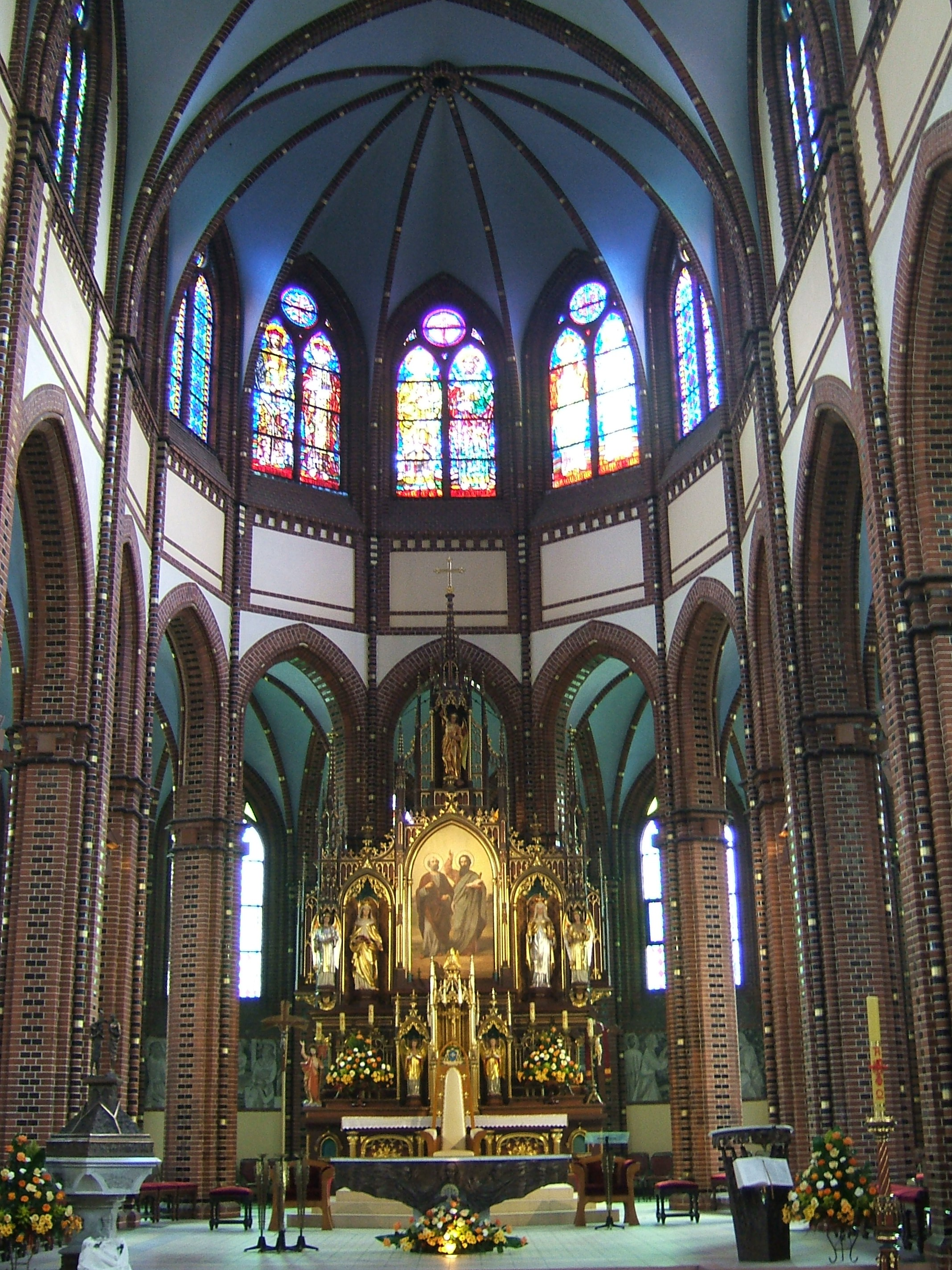
Interior view
