= Andrzej Iwanecki =

Polish Roman Catholic prelate)

Andrzej Iwaniecki
- Auxiliary Bishop of Gliwice
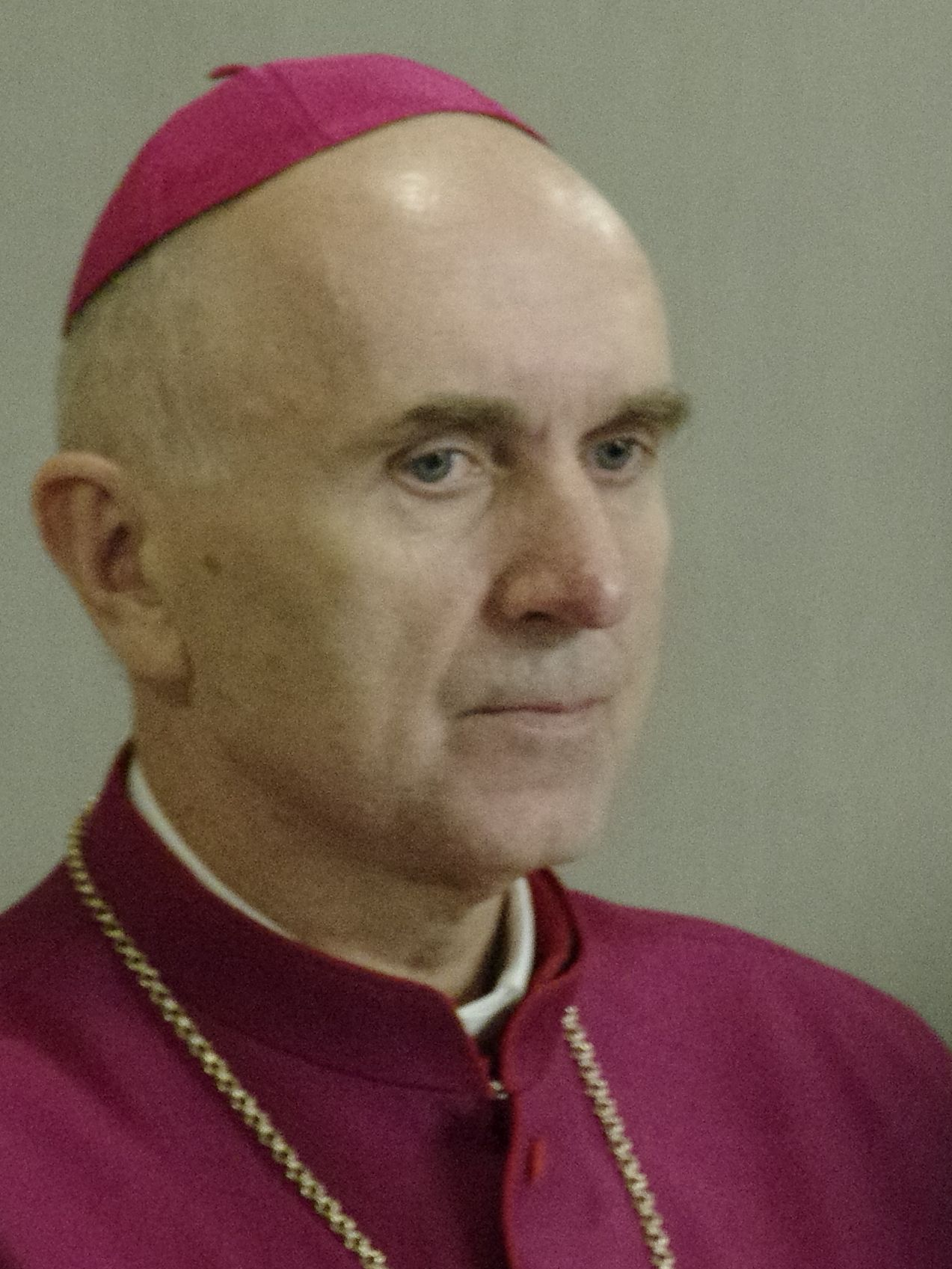
- Appointed: 18 November 2017

Orders
- Ordination: 27 March 1985 by Damian Zimoń
- Consecration: 7 January 2018 by Jan Kopiec

Personal details
- Born: 3 November 1960 (age 65) Siemianowice Śląskie, Polish People's Republic
- Motto: Jezus jest Panem; (Jesus is the Lords)
- Coat of arms

Andrzej Iwanecki (born 3 November 1960 in Siemianowice Śląskie) is a Polish auxiliary bishop in the Roman Catholic Diocese of Gliwice.

== Life ==
He was born into a Catholic family. Between 1979 and 1986, he studied philosophy and theology in the High Silesian Seminary (pl:Wyższe Śląskie Seminarium Duchowne w Katowicach). He began his studies in Kracow, then after one year the seminary was removed to Katowice. During study he worked as a miner in the coal mining area in Siemianowice (pl:Kopalnia Węgla Kamiennego Siemianowice) for one year.

He was ordained a priest on 27 March 1985 by bishop Damian Zimoń in the cathedral of Christ the King in Katowice. He was later named Auxiliary Bishop of Gliwice by Pope Francis and consecrated by Jan Kopiec on 7 January the following year.
