= St. Michael's Church, Prudnik =

St. Michael's Church
- Kościół św. Michała Archanioła
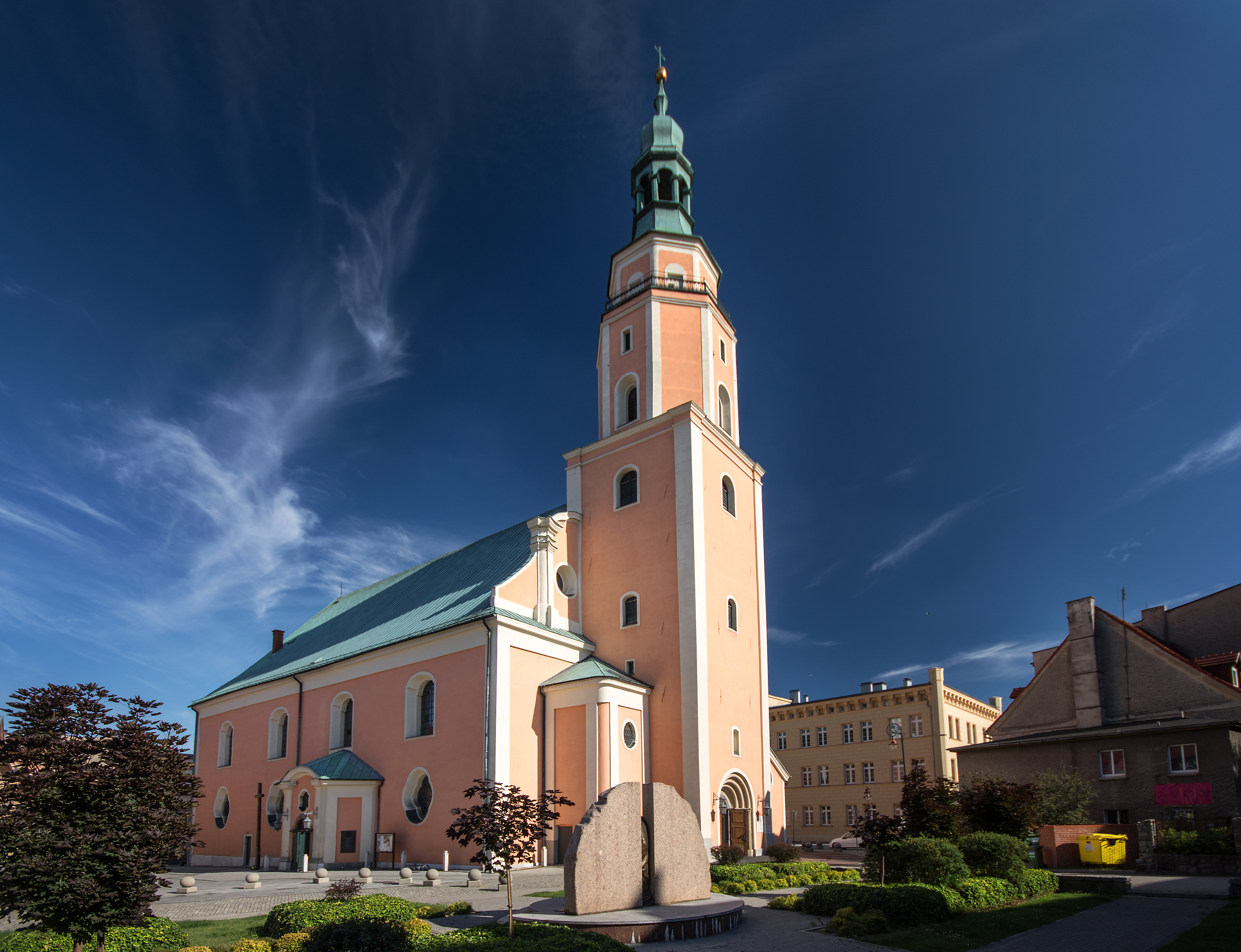
- St. Michael's Church
- St. Michael's Church
- Location: Prudnik
- Country: Poland
- Denomination: Roman Catholic
- Website: http://www.michalprudnik.com.pl

Architecture
- Architect: Johann Innozenz Töpper
- Architectural type: Baroque
- Groundbreaking: 1730
- Completed: 1738

Specifications
- Materials: Brick

Administration
- Diocese: Roman Catholic Diocese of Opole

St. Michael's Church in Prudnik, Poland, is a Baroque brick church, part of the Roman Catholic Diocese of Opole. It's located in the southern part of the Old Town on the Farny Square.

== History ==
The first church in Prudnik was built of wood in 1279. The current one was designed by Johann Innozenz Töpper. It was built in the years 1730–1738. In 1779 the church and tower roofs were damaged in the fire by Austrian blasting. After World War II the church was taken over by the Dominican Order. Dominicans left Prudnik in 1999.

== See also ==
- Saints Peter and Paul Church, Prudnik
- St. Joseph Church, Prudnik
