= St. Joseph Church, Prudnik =

St. Joseph Church
- Kościół św. Józefa
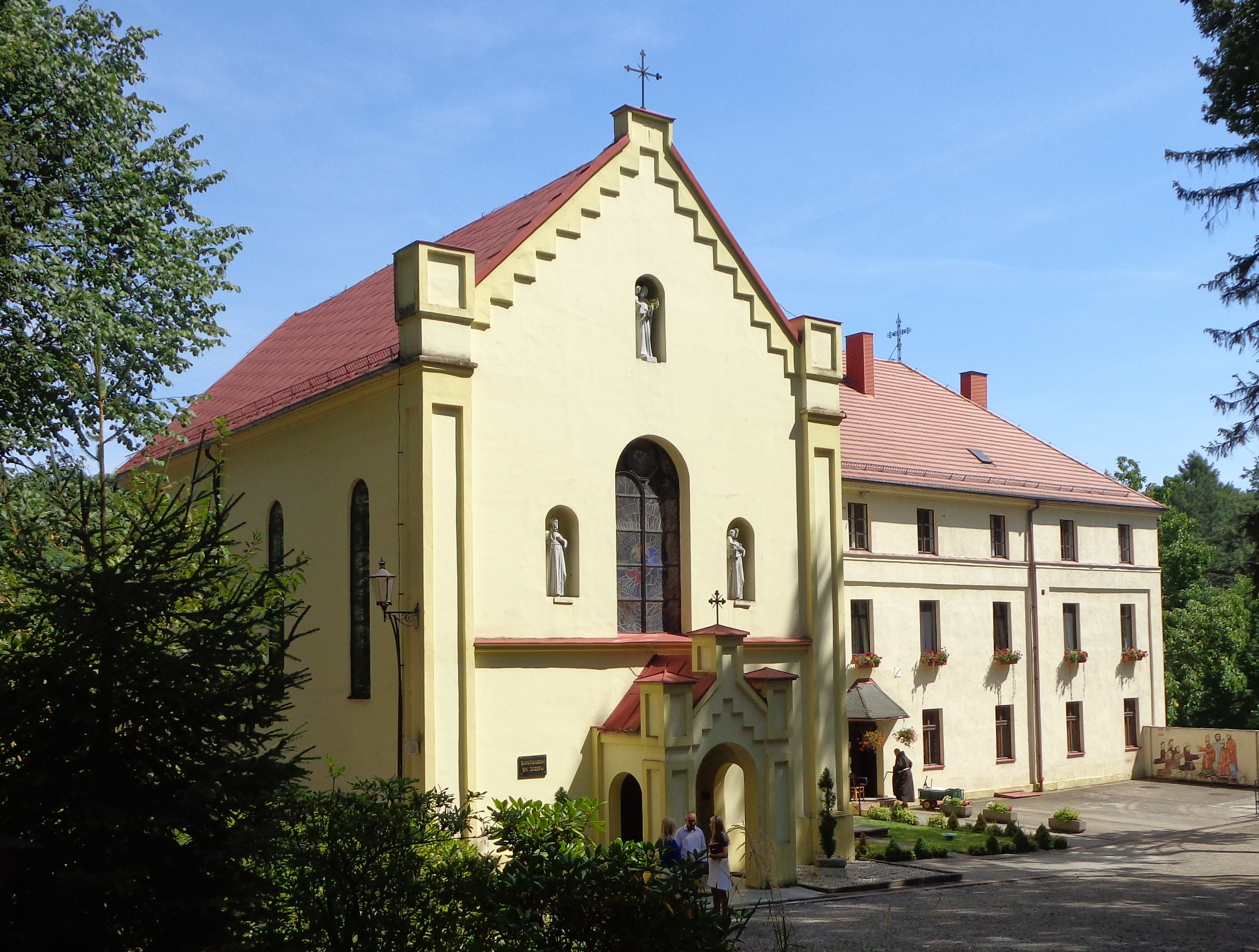
- St. Joseph Church
- St. Joseph Church
- Location: Prudnik
- Country: Poland
- Denomination: Roman Catholic
- Website: http://prudnik.franciszkanie.com/

Architecture
- Groundbreaking: 1866
- Completed: 1866

Specifications
- Materials: Brick

Administration
- Diocese: Roman Catholic Diocese of Opole

St. Joseph Church in Prudnik, Poland, is a brick church, part of the Roman Catholic Diocese of Opole. It's located on the Józefa Poniatowskiego Street.

The church was built in 1866. It was partially destroyed during the battle of Prudnik in 1945. Archbishop Stefan Wyszyński was prisoned here from 1954 to 1955 by the communists.

== See also ==
- Saints Peter and Paul Church, Prudnik
- St. Michael's Church, Prudnik
