= Sts. Apostles Peter and Paul Church (Prudnik) =

Coordinates: 50°19′22″N 17°34′37″E

- Kościół Świętych Apostołów Piotra i Pawła
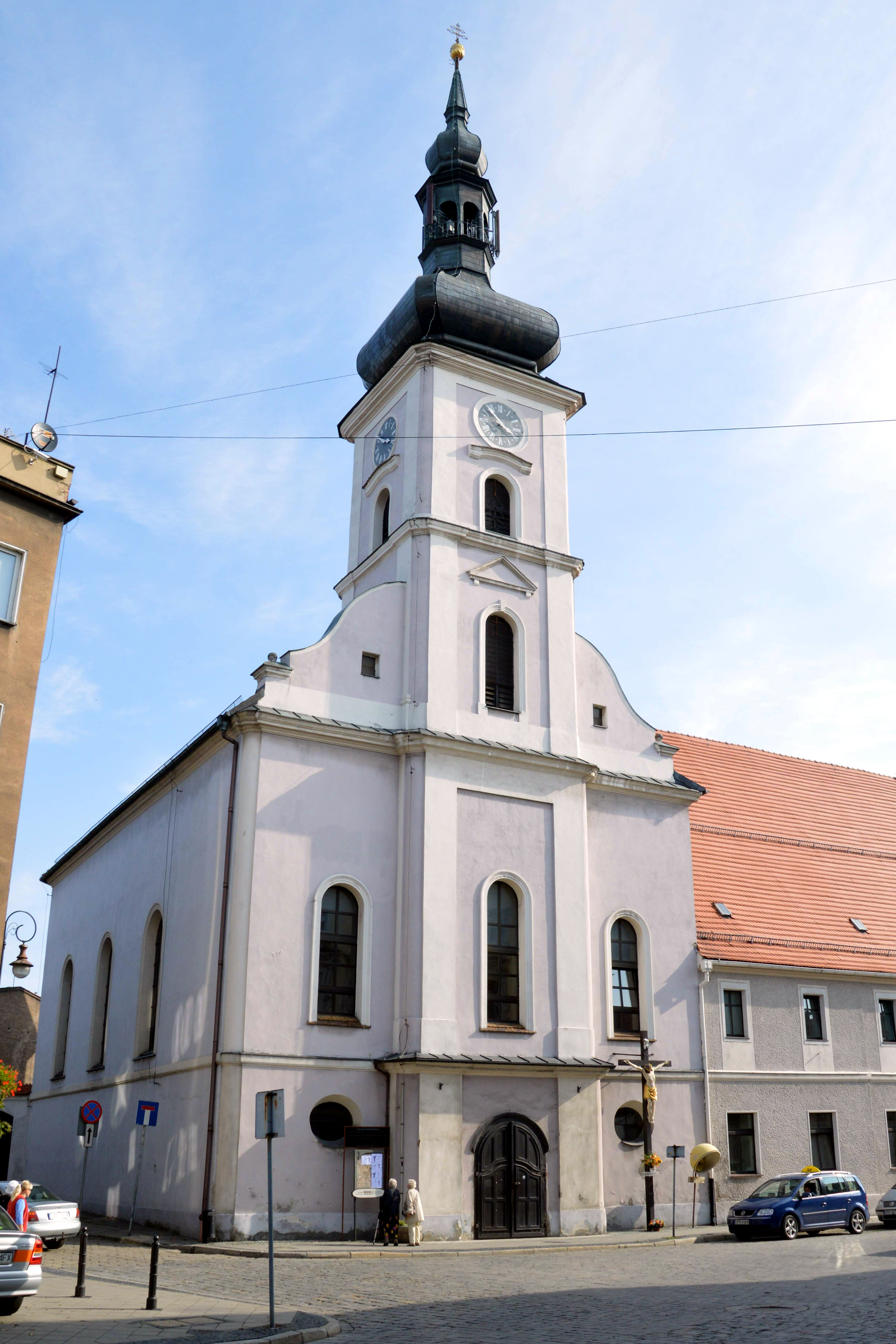
- Saints Peter and Paul Church
- Sts. Apostles Peter and Paul Church
- Location: Prudnik
- Country: Poland
- Denomination: Roman Catholic

Architecture
- Architect: Michał Klemens
- Groundbreaking: 1785
- Completed: 1787

Specifications
- Materials: Brick

Administration
- Diocese: Roman Catholic Diocese of Opole

The Sts. Apostles Peter and Paul Church, located in Prudnik, Poland, is a brick church. It is part of the Roman Catholic Diocese of Opole and is situated on the Piastowska Street. The church belongs to the religious order of Brothers Hospitallers of Saint John of God.

The architect of the church was Michał Klemens from Krnov. It was completed in 1787. In 1793 the church was decorated with a tower. The northern wing of the church was built during the World War I.

== See also ==
- St. Michael's Church, Prudnik
- St. Joseph Church, Prudnik
