= Sirghe =

Sirghe was a Roman and Byzantine era city in the Roman province of Lydia in Asia Minor (modern Turkey). Sirghe was on the south bank of the Hermos River, near the town of Bageis(probably opposite) and minted its own coins. Sirghe
