= Brożec, Opole Voivodeship =

Brożec Broschütz
- Village
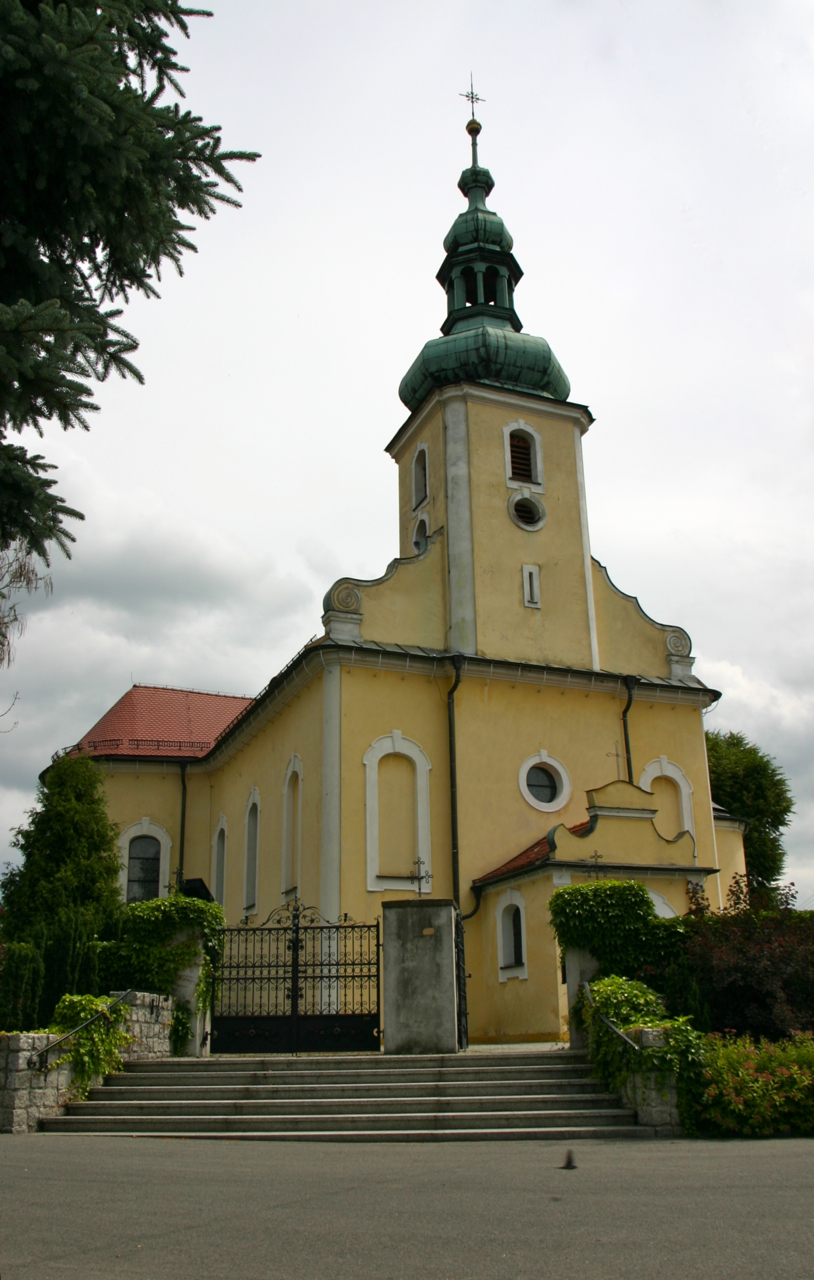
- All Saints church in Brożec

- Location within Poland
- Coordinates: 50°24′55″N 17°58′48″E
- Country: Poland
- Voivodeship: Opole
- County: Krapkowice
- Gmina: Walce
- First mentioned: 1228
- Time zone: UTC+1 (CET)
  - Summer (DST): UTC+2 (CEST)
- Vehicle registration: OKR

Brożec ([ˈbrɔʐɛt͡s], additional name in German: Broschütz) is a village in the administrative district of Gmina Walce, within Krapkowice County, Opole Voivodeship, in southern Poland.

Historically, the village was also known in Polish as Broszec.

One Polish citizen was murdered by Nazi Germany in the village during World War II.
