= Bageis =

Human settlement

Coordinates: 38°39′55″N 29°09′30″E

This page concerns Lydian Bageis, Bagis or Bage, not to be confounded with Bagae in Numidia.

Bageis (Ancient Greek: Βάγεις), Bagis (Βάγις), or Bage (Βάγη) was an ancient Greek city in the province of Lydia in Asia Minor (modern day Turkey).

== Name ==
The name of the city appears in the form Bageis (in the genitive plural case of the name of its inhabitants, ΒΑΓΝΩΝ or ΒΑΓΗΝΩΝ) on its coins, but Bagis is the form given in the Synecdemos of Hierocles, and Bage in later Notitiae Episcopatuum. Some of its coins add the additional name of KAISAREΩN apparently denoting the additional city name of Caesarea.

== Location ==
Inscriptions uncovered by Keppel place the ancient town near Sirghe on the left (south) side of the Hermos River. Modern scholars pinpoint a site at Güre.

== Ecclesiastical history ==
The episcopal see of Bagis, being in the Roman province of Lydia was a suffragan of Sardis, the capital of the province.

The acts of the First Council of Nicaea (325) mention a Pollio as bishop of Baris in that province. Since there is no evidence of a bishopric of that name, Janin (1931), following Adolf von Harnack, consider "Baris" to be an error for "Bagis", while Pétrirdès (1907), who cites Heinrich Gelzer and C. H. Turner, does not accept that correction. Other known bishops of Bagis are Chrysapius or Chrysanthus, who was at the Robber Council of Ephesus in 449, Leonides, who was a signatory of the joint letter that the bishops of Lydia sent in 459 to Byzantine Emperor Leo I the Thracian with regard to the murder of Proterius of Alexandria, and Basilius and Clemens, who were at the Council of Constantinople (879), presumably one of them ordained by Patriarch Ignatius of Constantinople, the other by Photius.

Bagis must have disappeared as a residential see during the Turkish-Byzantine wars, perhaps in the 12th century, although it continued to be listed in Notitiae Episcopatuum.

No longer a residential bishopric, Bagis is today listed by the Catholic Church as a titular see. a list of titular bishops includes:

- St. Francesco Antonio Domenico Fogolla, (28 June 1898 appointed – 9 July 1900)
- Joaquim Silvério de Souza † (16 November 1901 appointed – 17 May 1905), Bishop of Diamantina.
- Celestin Ibáñez y Aparicio,(12 April 1911 – 11 April 1946), Bishop of Yan'an [Yenan])
- Jorge Marcos de Oliveira (3 Aug 1946 appointed – 26 July 1954), Bishop of Santo André, São Paulo
- Ramón Pastor Bogarín Argaña (1 Dec 1954 appointed – 19 January 1957), Bishop of San Juan Bautista de las Misiones
- Albert Sanschagrin, (12 August 1957 – 13 June 1967) Bishop of Saint-Hyacinthe, Quebec
- José Afonso Ribeiro, (29 January 1979 appointed – 6 July 1988), Prelate of Borba, Amazonas
- João Evangelista Martins Terra (17 August 1988 appointed –)
