= Franciszek Jop =

Polish Roman Catholic bishop (1897 – 1976)

- Bishop of Opole
- Appointed: 28 June 1972
- Successor: Alfons Nossol
- Previous posts: Apostolic administrator of Opole (1956 – 1972); Apostolic administrator of Kraków (1952 – 1956); Auxiliary bishop of Sandomierz (1945 – 1956); Titular bishop of Daulis (1945 – 1956)

Orders
- Ordination: 29 August 1919 by Marian Józef Ryx
- Consecration: 19 May 1945 by Jan Kanty Lorek

Personal details
- Born: 8 October 1897 Stara Słupia
- Died: 24 September 1976 (aged 78) Opole

Franciszek Jop (8 October 1897 – 24 September 1976) was the Polish Roman Catholic bishop of the Diocese of Opole from its formation in 1972 to his death in 1976. He previously served as apostolic administrator of the Apostolic Administration of Opole from 1956 to 1972, apostolic administrator of the Archdiocese of Kraków from 1952 to 1956, and auxiliary bishop of the Diocese of Sandomierz from 1945 to 1956.

== Biography ==
Jop was born in Stara Słupia to Jan and Rozalia Jop. He was first educated at Nowa Słupia and Sandomierz, graduating from a gymnasium from Warsaw in 1914. He began attending the diocesan seminary in Sandomierz after graduating, where he received a tonsure and was ordained to the minor orders on 4 June 1917 by Marian Józef Ryx. He was ordained to the subdiaconate on 12 October 1919 and to the diaconate on 1 August 1920 by Paweł Kubicki. He was ordained a priest on 29 August 1920 at Sandomierz Cathedral by Marian Józef Ryx.

In 1919, Jop was sent to study canon law at the Pontifical Gregorian University. He received a baccalaureate degree on 10 July 1920, a Licentiate of Canon Law on 13 July 1921, and a doctorate on 17 July 1922. After returning to Poland, he was appointed as a professor at the diocesan seminary in Sandomierz on 6 September 1922, where he taught canon and secular law as well as liturgy. Jop was appointed chancellor of the diocesan curia for the Diocese of Sandomierz in 1925. In the same year, he began editing the Kronika Diecezji Sandomierskiej, a monthly newspaper that was operated by the diocesan curia, serving as its editor until 14 February 1949. Jop was appointed honorary canon of the Diocese of Sandomierz on 14 April 1922.

On 24 October 1945, Jop was appointed auxiliary bishop of the Diocese of Sandomierz and titular bishop of Daulis. He was consecrated on 19 May 1946 in Sandomierz by Jan Kanty Lorek. His co-consecrators were Czesław Kaczmarek and Franciszek Sonik. Later that same year, Jop was appointed dean of the cathedral chapter in Sandomierz. He was appointed vicar general of the Diocese of Sandomierz on 29 May 1946, holding the position until he requested dismissal on 27 July 1957. He was appointed director for the Diocese of Sandomierz's apostolate of prayer on 13 November 1947.

On 28 April 1951, Jop was appointed by Pope Pius XII to administer church territories located in Opole Silesia, though he was not able to assume control of the territories there. He was elected as vicar capitular of the Archdiocese of Kraków on 13 December 1952; he assumed control of the Archdiocese on 17 December. As vicar capitular, he placed great emphasis on the unity and intellectual formation of the priesthood of the Archdiocese. He was further appointed commissioner for the Cistercian Order in Poland on 14 August 1954. Jop was nominated to serve as vicar general for the primate of Poland in the apostolic administration of Opole Silesia on 1 December 1956. His term as vicar capitular of Kraków also ended on 3 December 1956, when Eugeniusz Baziak returned to assume control of the Archdiocese in the wake of Polish October.

Jop assumed control of the apostolic administration in Opole Silesia on 16 December 1956. He was appointed apostolic administrator ad nutum Sanctae Sedis of the apostolic administration of Opole on 25 May 1967. On 28 June 1972, Jop was appointed by Pope Paul VI as bishop of the newly-formed Dioese of Opole. He died in Opole on 24 September 1976. His funeral was held on 29 September 1976 and he was buried in a crypt below Opole Cathedral.
