= Alfons Nossol =

Polish Roman Catholic archbishop and theologian (born 1932)

Most Reverend Alfons Nossol
- Archbishop-Bishop Emeritus of Opole
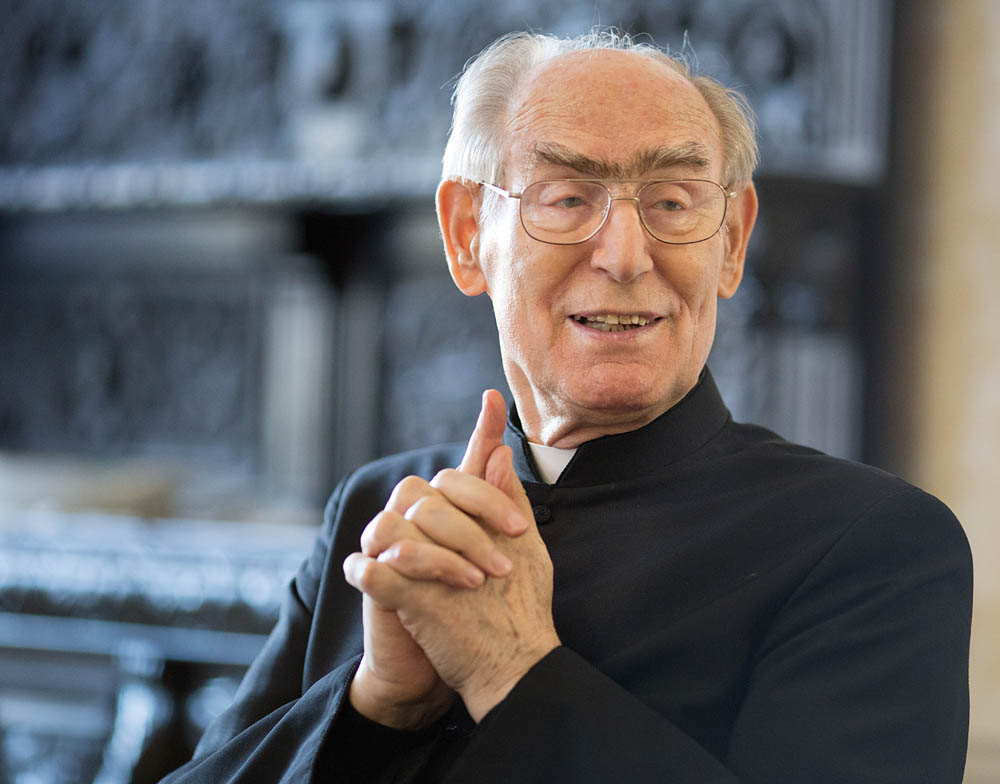
- Nossol in 2015
- Church: Roman Catholic
- Province: Katowice
- Diocese: Opole
- Appointed: 25 June 1977
- Installed: 17 August 1977
- Term ended: 14 August 2009
- Predecessor: Franciszek Jop
- Successor: Andrzej Czaja

Orders
- Ordination: 23 June 1957 by Franciszek Jop
- Consecration: 17 August 1977 by Stefan Wyszyński
- Rank: Archbishop (personal title)

Personal details
- Born: 8 August 1932 (age 94) Broschütz, Weimar Republic (now Poland)
- Education: Major Theological Seminary in Nysa, Catholic University of Lublin
- Motto: Veritatem facere in caritate

Alfons Nossol (born 8 August 1932) is a Polish Roman Catholic prelate and theologian, who served as the Bishop of Opole from 1977 to 2009. He was elevated to the personal title of Archbishop in 1999 by Pope John Paul II. Nossol is widely recognized for his contributions to ecumenism and his pivotal role in Germany–Poland relations.

== Biography ==
=== Early life and academic career ===
Alfons Nossol was born in Broschütz (now Brożec) in Upper Silesia. He studied philosophy and theology at the Major Theological Seminary in Nysa. He was ordained a priest on 23 June 1957 by Bishop Franciszek Jop.

Following his ordination, he pursued advanced studies at the Catholic University of Lublin (KUL), where he earned a doctorate in 1961 and completed his habilitation in 1976. He later became a professor at the same university, specializing in dogmatic theology.

=== Episcopal ministry ===
On 25 June 1977, Pope Paul VI appointed him Bishop of Opole. He received his episcopal consecration on 17 August 1977 from Cardinal Stefan Wyszyński.

During his tenure, Nossol became a leading voice in the Polish Episcopal Conference, particularly in the fields of ecumenism and intercultural dialogue. On 12 November 1999, Pope John Paul II granted him the personal title of Archbishop in recognition of his significant pastoral and academic achievements.

He reached the mandatory retirement age in 2007, but his resignation was formally accepted by Pope Benedict XVI on 14 August 2009.

=== Reconciliation and ecumenism ===
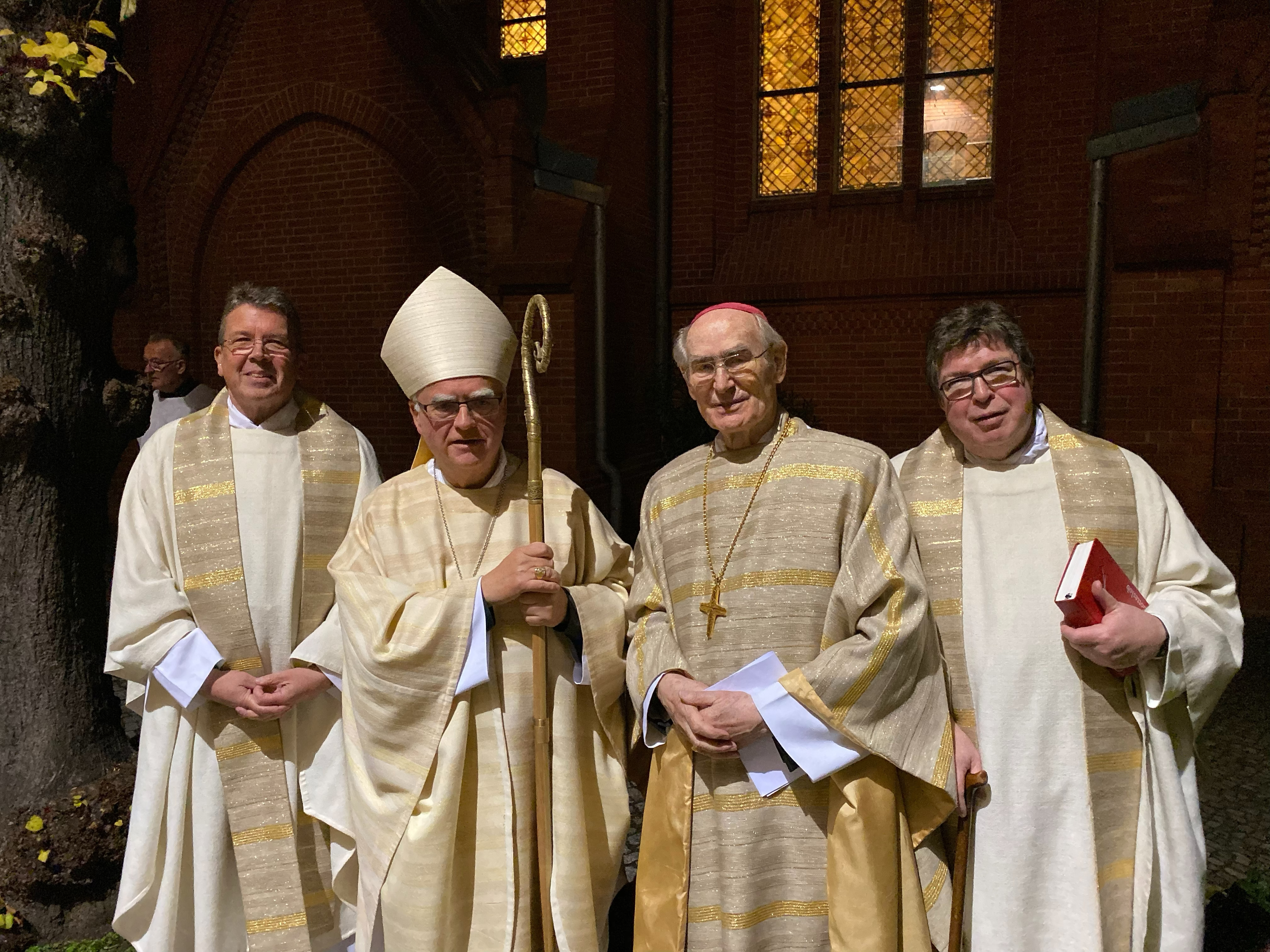
Archbishop Nossol with other clergy after the Mass commemorating the 30th anniversary of the Peaceful Revolution of 1989

Archbishop Nossol is famously associated with the "Mass of Reconciliation" held on 12 November 1989 in Krzyżowa. During this event, which Nossol officiated and for which he delivered the homily in both Polish and German, Polish Prime Minister Tadeusz Mazowiecki and German Chancellor Helmut Kohl exchanged the sign of peace and embraced. This gesture, occurring just three days after the fall of the Berlin Wall, is considered a historic turning point in post-war Germany–Poland relations.

He served as a long-standing member of the Pontifical Council for Promoting Christian Unity and participated in various international theological commissions, particularly those facilitating dialogue between the Catholic and Lutheran churches.

== Honors and awards ==
- Order of the White Eagle (Poland)
- Grand Cross of the Order of Merit of the Federal Republic of Germany
- Honorary doctorates from the University of Münster, University of Mainz, and the University of Opole.
