= Opole Cathedral =

Coordinates: 50.6703°N 17.9203°E

Cathedral of the Holy Cross
- Katedra Podwyższenia Krzyża Świętego
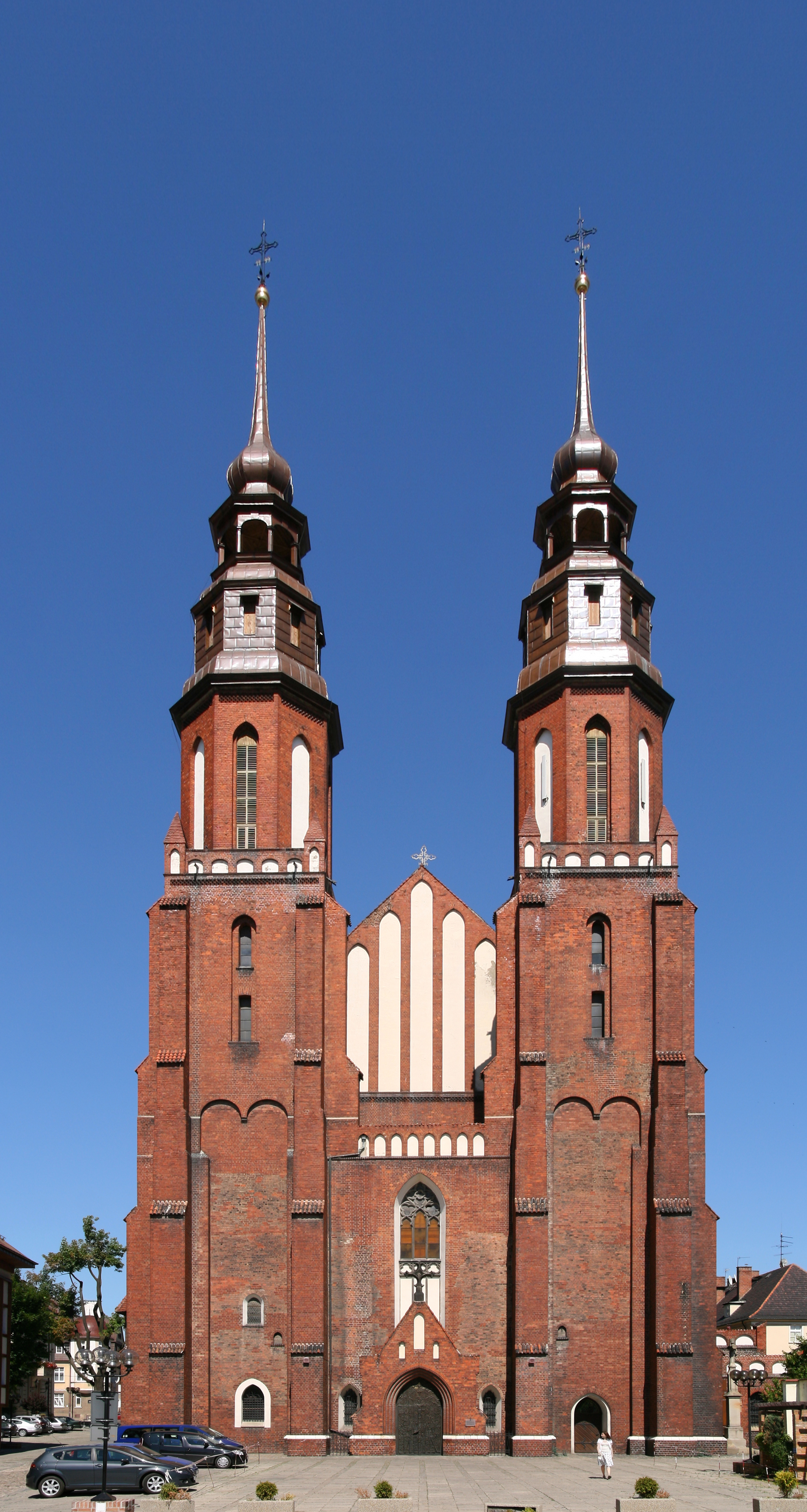
- Cathedral of the Holy Cross
- Location: Opole
- Country: Poland
- Denomination: Roman Catholic Church

History
- Dedication: The Most Holy Virgin Mary, Queen of Poland

The Cathedral of the Holy Cross (Polish: Katedra Podwyższenia Krzyża Świętego), also called Opole Cathedral, is a religious building affiliated with the Catholic Church that serves as a parish church and the cathedral city of Opole in Poland. The church belongs to the parish of the Holy Cross in Opole in the deanery of Opole, part of the Roman Catholic Diocese of Opole (established in 1972). On April 3, 1964, the temple was entered in the register of regional monuments of Opole under number 763/64.

The current church was built in the fifteenth century on the site where before there was a structure of the eleventh and thirteenth centuries. It was rebuilt several times. With towers with a height of 73 meters is the tallest structure in the city. In the temple there is a painting of the Virgin of Opole, brought there permanently in 1702.

The Cathedral contains the Piast Chapel, which is the burial site of Duke Jan II the Good of the Piast dynasty.

== See also ==
- Roman Catholicism in Poland
