= University of Opole =

Public university in Opole, Poland

Coordinates: 50°40′8″N 17°55′33″E

- Uniwersytet Opolski
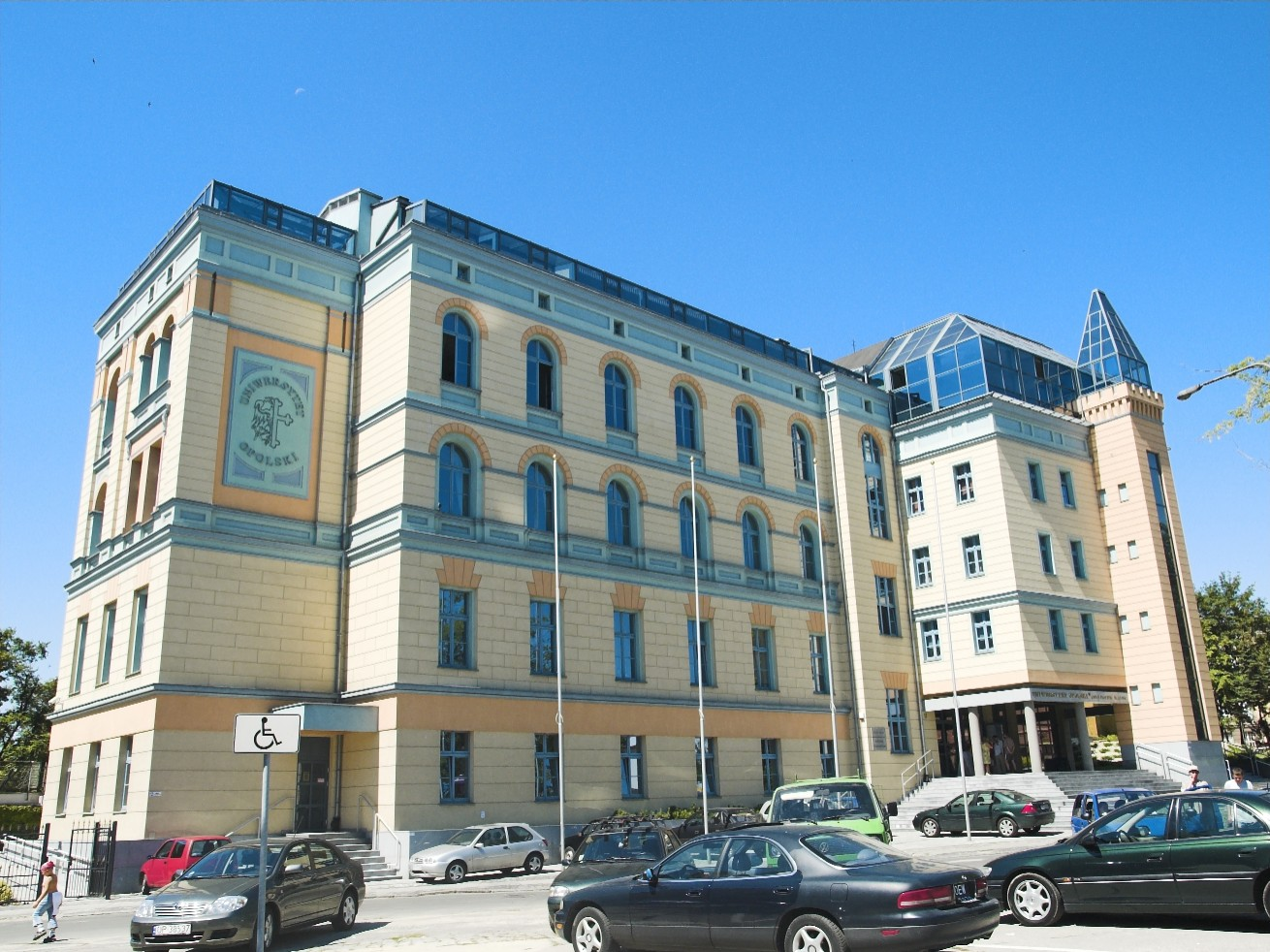
- Latin: Universitas Opoliensis
- Type: Public
- Established: 1994
- Affiliations: Socrates-Erasmus
- Rector: Marek Masnyk
- Students: 8,734 (12.2023)
- Location: Opole, Poland
- Language: pl
- Website: www.uni.opole.pl

University rankings

Regional – Overall
- QS Emerging Europe and Central Asia: 241-250 (2022)

The University of Opole (Polish: Uniwersytet Opolski) is a public university in the city of Opole. It was founded in 1994 from a merger of two parallel educational institutions. The university has 17,500 students completing 32 academic majors and 53 specializations. The staff numbers 1,380 - among them are 203 professors and habilitated doctors and 327 doctors.

The university confers Licentiate, Master's, doctoral, and post-doctoral degrees.

It educates students in forty-seven primary fields of study, both in full-time and part-time programs. For several years, the University of Opole has been an interdisciplinary institution with a predominance of humanities courses. It consists of twelve faculties, twenty institutes, and twelve intercollegiate units, including the Main Library, the Foreign Language Centre, and the Physical Education and Sports Centre.

== Faculties ==
1. Faculty of Philology
2. Faculty of Social Sciences
3. Faculty of Theology
4. Faculty of Mathematics, Physics and Computer Science
5. Faculty of Natural Sciences and Technology
6. Faculty of Economics
7. Faculty of Law and Administration
8. Faculty of Chemistry and Pharmacy
9. Faculty of Art
10. Faculty of Medicine
11. Faculty of Health Sciences
12. Faculty of Political Science and Social Communication

== Scientific journal ==
The University of Opole publishes a peer-reviewed academic journal Economic and Environmental Studies (print: ISSN 1642-2597, online: ISSN 2081-8319), which deals with economics, environment, and sustainable development, with contributions from academics from all over Europe and Australia. Within the field of economics it belongs to the new institutional economics. The journal is published by the University of Opole and was established in 2001. The editors-in-chief are Joachim Ahrens and Joost Platje.
