= Diocese of Opole =

Roman Catholic diocese in Poland

Coordinates: 50.6703°N 17.9203°E

Diocese of Opole Dioecesis Opoliensis Diecezja Opolska

Catholic
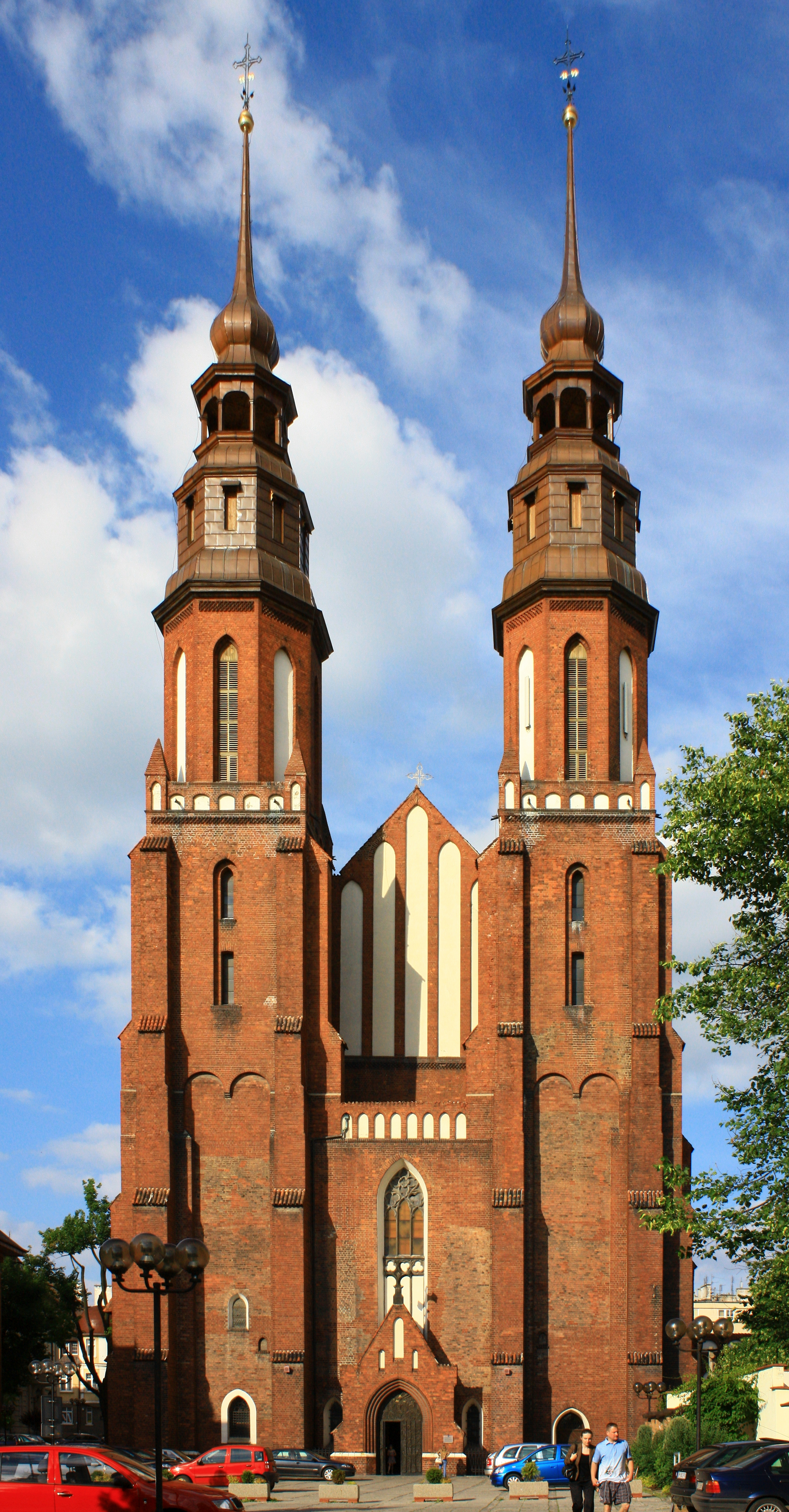
- Cathedral of the Holy Cross in Opole

Location
- Country: Poland
- Metropolitan: Katowice

Statistics
- Area: 8,033 km^{2} (3,102 sq mi)
- Population: Total; Catholics: (as of 2021); 850,693; 783,056 (92.0%)

Information
- Denomination: Catholic Church
- Rite: Latin Rite
- Cathedral: Katedra św. Krzyża (Cathedral of the Holy Cross)

Current leadership
- Pope: Leo XIV
- Bishop: Andrzej Czaja
- Auxiliary Bishops: Rudolf Pierskała; Waldemar Musioł
- Bishops emeritus: Alfons Nossol; Paweł Stobrawa

Map

Website
- Website of the Diocese

The Diocese of Opole (Latin: Dioecesis Opoliensis) is a Latin diocese of the Catholic Church located in the city of Opole in the ecclesiastical province of Katowice in Poland.

== History ==
- 1945: Established as Apostolic Administration of Opole
- 28 June 1972: Established as Diocese of Opole, part of the ecclesiastical province of Wrocław, from the Upper Silesian part of the Archdiocese of Wrocław and the General Vicariate of Branice of the Archdiocese of Olmütz
- 25 March 1992: made part of the ecclesiastical province of Katowice, lost territory to establish Diocese of Gliwice

== Special churches ==
- Minor Basilica:
  - Sanktuarium św. Anny on the Góra Świętej Anny
    (Saint Anne's Mountain)

== Leadership ==
- Bishops of Opole (Roman rite)
  - Bishop Franciszek Jop (1972 – 1976.09.24)
  - Archbishop Alfons Nossol (1977.06.25 – 2009.08.14)
  - Bishop Andrzej Czaja (since 2009.08.14)

== See also ==
- Roman Catholicism in Poland

== Sources ==
- GCatholic.org
- Catholic Hierarchy
- Diocese website
