= Piotr Turzyński =

Polish Roman Catholic prelate (1964–2025)

Piotr Wojciech Turzyński
- Auxiliary Bishop of Radom
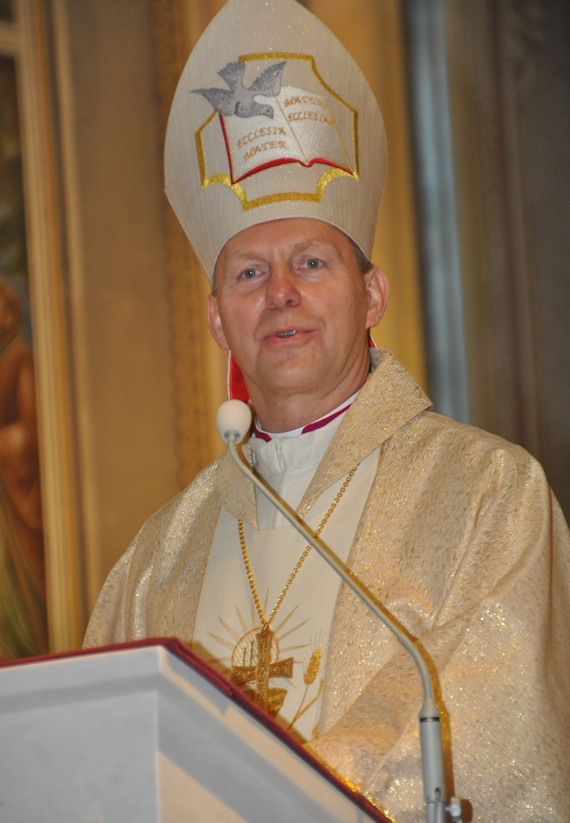
- Turzyński in 2015
- Metropolis: Częstochowa
- Diocese: Radom
- Appointed: 17 January 2015
- Term ended: 14 April 2025
- Other post: Titular Bishop of Usilla (2015–2025)

Orders
- Ordination: 28 May 1988 by Edward Henryk Materski
- Consecration: 28 February 2015 by Celestino Migliore

Personal details
- Born: 28 September 1964 Radom, Poland
- Died: 14 April 2025 (aged 60) Radom, Poland
- Motto: Ecclesia Mater – Mater Ecclesiae
- Coat of arms

Styles of Piotr Wojciech Turzyński
- Reference style: His Excellency; The Most Reverend
- Spoken style: Your Excellency
- Religious style: Bishop

Piotr Wojciech Turzyński (28 September 1964 – 14 April 2025) was a Polish Roman Catholic bishop who served as Auxiliary Bishop of Radom from 2015 until his death in 2025.

== Biography ==
=== Early life and education ===
Turzyński was born on 28 September 1964, in Radom, Poland, as one of three children of Julian and Helena née Rzadkowska.He was educated at the local Tytus Chałubiński 4th High School, where he passed his secondary school leaving exam in 1982. During his high school years, he was an animator of the Light-Life Movement.

From 1982 to 1988, Turzyński studied philosophy and theology at the Higher Seminary in Sandomierz. On 28 May 1988, he was ordained a priest by Bishop Edward Materski in the Radom co-cathedral. He was incardinated into the Sandomierz-Radom diocese.

Turzyński obtained his master's degree in theology at the Catholic University of Lublin. He continued his studies at the Augustinianum Patristic Institute in Rome from 1989 to 1992, graduating with a licentiate in theology and patristic sciences. He continued his studies at the Pontifical Gregorian University in Rome from 1992 to 1995, and, in 1996, he received a doctorate in theological sciences, based on the dissertation "Il Cantico nuovo nella teologia di sant'Agostino. Specialmente nelle Enarrationes in Psalmos" (English: "Canticum novum in the theology of Saint Augustine. Study on the Commentary on the Psalms"). He obtained his habilitation in 2014 at the Faculty of Theology of Cardinal Stefan Wyszyński University in Warsaw after submitting his dissertation, "Beauty, in the theology of Saint Augustine. An attempt to systematise Augustinian theological aesthetics".

=== Early priesthood ===
From 1988 to 1989, Turzyński worked as a vicar in the parish of the Mother of the Redeemer in Ostrowiec Świętokrzyski. During this period, he led a youth oasis group and a teachers' ministry. After the 1992 reorganisation of diocesan structures in Poland, he was included in the presbytery of the Diocese of Radom. In 1999, he was appointed director of the diocesan council for the permanent formation of priests, and in 2002, he joined the diocesan priests' council. In 2003, he was appointed canon of the Ostra Brama Chapter in Skarżysko-Kamienna. In 2006, he was appointed director of the diocesan council for consecrated life.

In 2008, during the second diocesan synod, Turzyński became the chairman of the synodal commission for culture, media and new evangelisation. He led parish, mission, and youth retreats, as well as retreats for priests, nuns, and clerics. He was also involved in the activities of the Home Church movement. He organised youth meetings for the Diocese of Radom under the names Kuźnia Młodych, Appeals for the Young, and Diocesan Days of Youth. He took part in founding the association Młyńska. Verum, Bonum, Pulchrum, which organised the Weeks of Christian Culture. He hosted evangelisation broadcasts on the diocesan Radio AVE and Radio Plus Radom.

=== Auxillary bishop of Radom ===
On 17 January 2015, Pope Francis appointed Turzyński auxiliary bishop of the Diocese of Radom, with the titular see of Usula. On 28 February 2015, he was ordained as a bishop at the Cathedral of the Protection of the Blessed Virgin Mary in Radom by Archbishop Celestino Migliore, Apostolic Nuncio to Poland, with co-consecrators Archbishop Wacław Depo and Bishop Henryk Tomasik,. He adopted the episcopal motto Ecclesia Mater ("Mother Church").. He subsequently served as vicar general in the diocesan curia.

During the 2015 Polish Episcopal Conference, he was appointed delegate for the pastoral care of teachers, and in 2022, delegate for the pastoral care of polish emigrants. He later became a member of several Episcopal Conference bodies, including the Permanent Council (2018), the Commission for the Doctrine of the Faith (2020), the Council for Social Affairs (2021), the Commission for the Clergy (2023), and the Joint Commission of Representatives of the Government of the Republic of Poland and the Polish Episcopal Conference (2024).

=== Educational career ===
From 1995 to 2006, Turzyński served as spiritual father at the Higher Theological Seminary in Radom, and in 2006 he became vice-rector of the seminary. He lectured in patrology, introduction to theology, and theology of spirituality. He also directed a clerical theatre group. In 2000, he became assistant professor at the Faculty of Theology in Radom (later renamed the Institute of Theology) at Cardinal Stefan Wyszyński University in Warsaw. From 2006 to 2012, he served as deputy director of the institute, overseeing part-time studies and the Benedict XVI Thought Center. In 2013, he was appointed assistant professor at the Faculty of Theology of the John Paul II Catholic University of Lublin in the Institute of Church History and Patrology at the Department of Greek and Latin Patrology.

== Personal life ==
Turzyński died of cancer at the age of 60 on 14 April 2025 in Radom. On 22 April, he was buried in the tombs of the bishops of Radom at the cemetery on Limanowskiego Street.

== Decorations and distinctions ==
In 2025, Turzyński was posthumously awarded the Officer's Cross of the Order of Polonia Restituta by President Andrzej Duda. He was later awarded the Bene Merenti Civitas Radomiensis medal.

Catholic Church titles
Preceded by —	Auxiliary Bishop of Radom; 2015–2025	Vacant
Preceded by Gabino Miranda Melgarejo	Titular Bishop of Usilla; 2015–2025	Vacant
