= World Youth Day 2016 =

International Catholic youth event

- Date: 26 July 2016– 31 July 2016
- Location: Kraków, Poland; 50.030934°N 20.093380°E
- Type: Youth festival
- Theme: Blessed are the merciful, for they will receive mercy. (Mt 5:7)
- Organised by: Catholic Church
- Participants: Pope Francis
- Previous: 2013 Rio de Janeiro
- Next: 2019 Panama City
- Website: archive.krakow2016.com

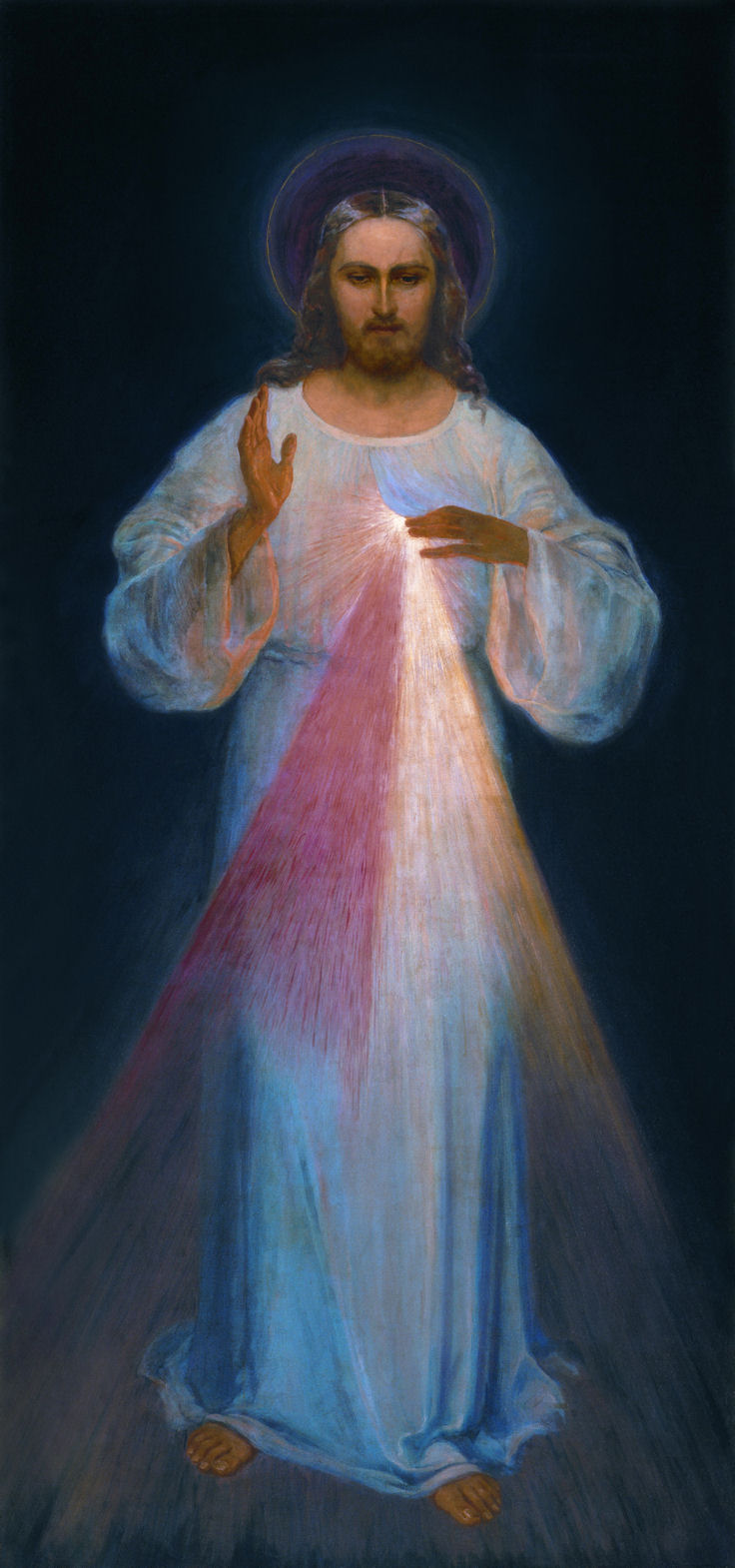
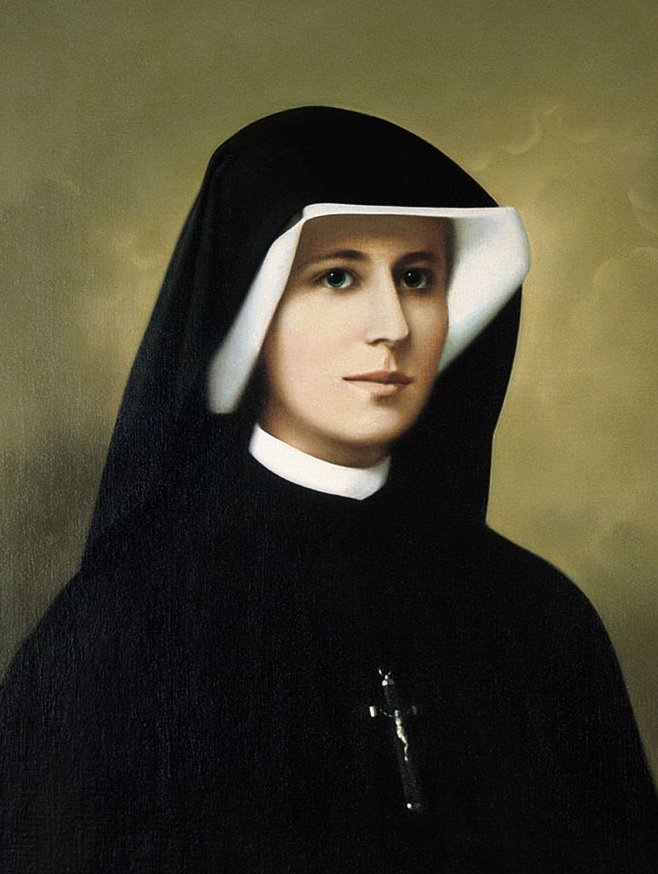
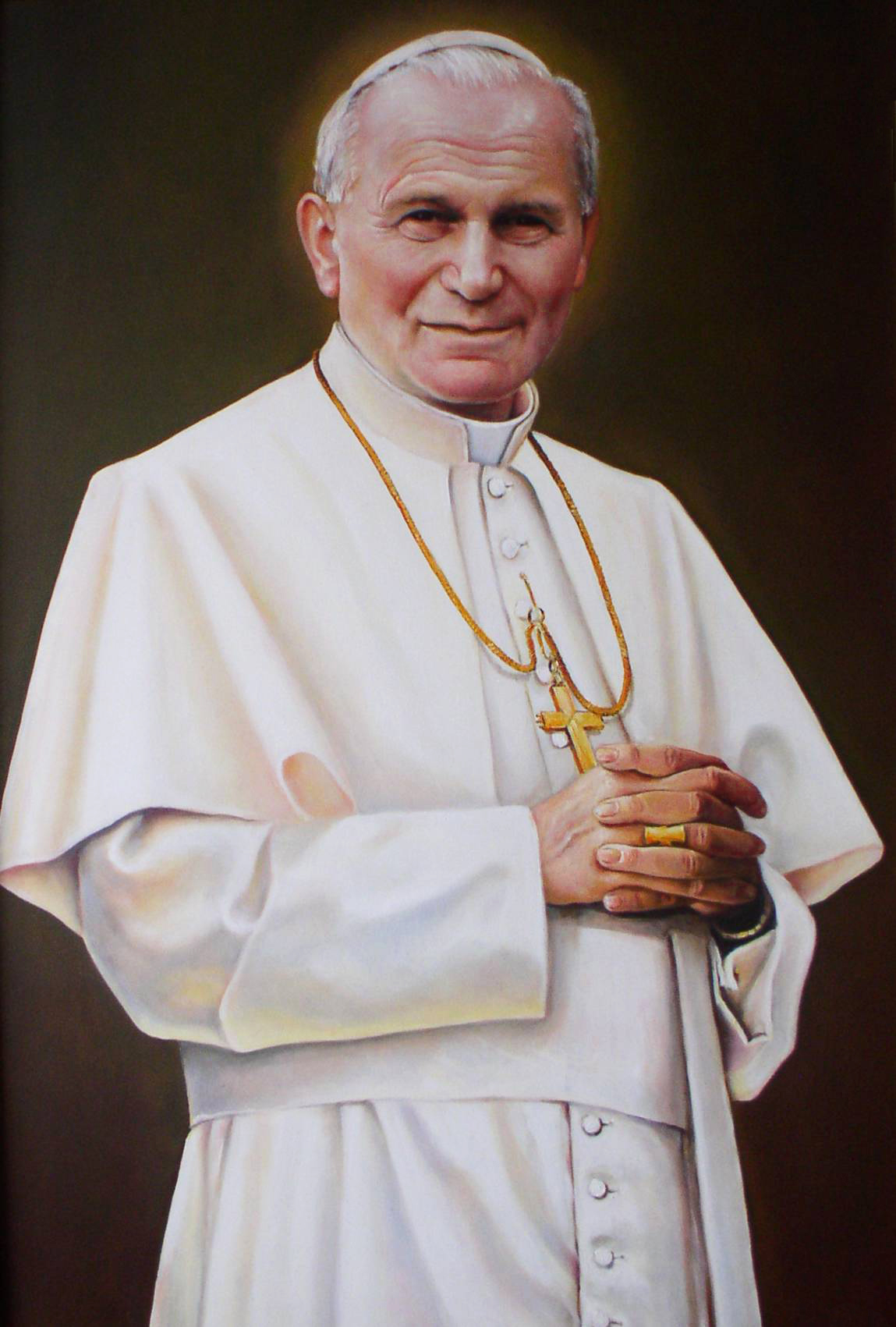
The three figures of the World Youth Day 2016: the image of Merciful Jesus (from the Divine Mercy devotion), Mary Faustina Kowalska and John Paul II

World Youth Day 2016 (WYD 2016; Polish: Światowe Dni Młodzieży 2016) was the 15th World Youth Day, an international event organised by the Catholic Church and focused on faith and youth that took place from 26 to 31 July 2016 in Kraków, Poland. It was the third World Youth Day held in Central Europe.

Pope Francis announced at the end of the closing Mass of the previous World Youth Day 2013 in Rio de Janeiro that Kraków, Poland, will be the venue for World Youth Day 2016. This will be the second World Youth Day hosted by Poland, the first being the World Youth Day 1991 held in Częstochowa.

According to Cardinal Stanisław Dziwisz, the Metropolitan Archbishop of the Archdiocese of Kraków, World Youth Day 2016 was to be particularly significant as a tribute to Pope John Paul II, founder of the World Youth Day, as Kraków was his home. As he is such a popular saint in Poland, canonized on 27 April 2014, Cardinal Dziwisz said that the news of hosting another World Youth Day in Poland has been met with "enthusiasm", and all Catholic dioceses in Poland will be supporting the event. Special activities related to John Paul II's devotion to the Merciful Jesus (Divine Mercy devotion) based on Mary Faustina Kowalska apparitions and message.

World Youth Day 2016 concluded on 31 July, as scheduled. It is estimated that 3 million pilgrims celebrated the event.

== Activities ==
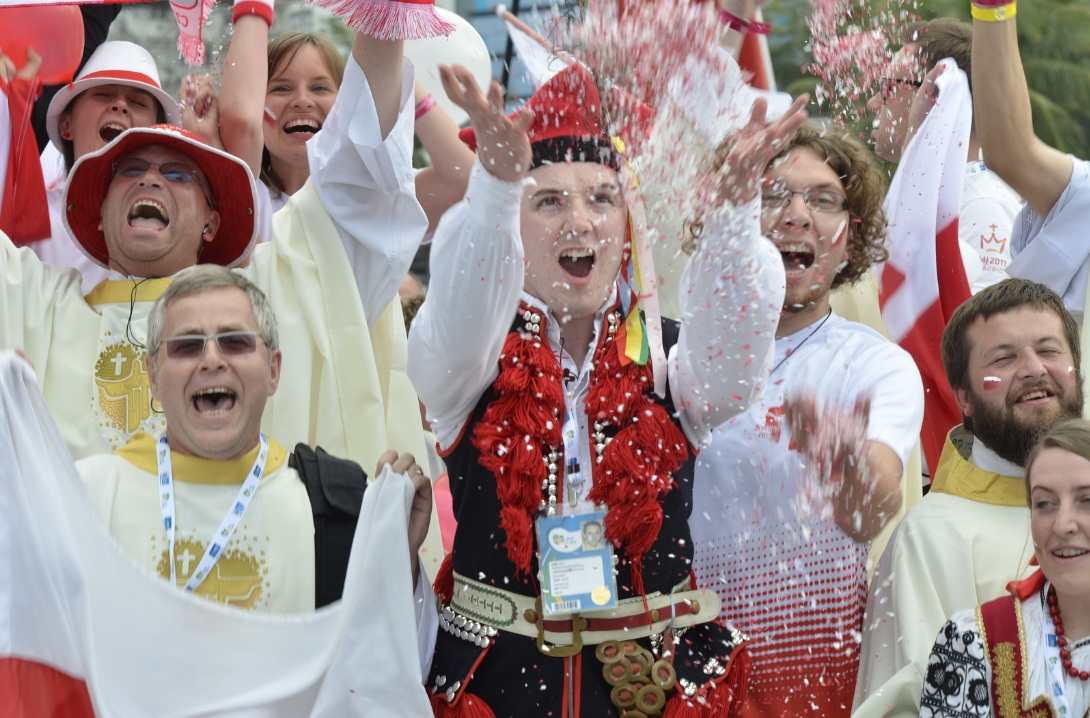
Polish pilgrims celebrate the announcement (2013) that the World Youth Day 2016 will take place in Kraków, Poland.

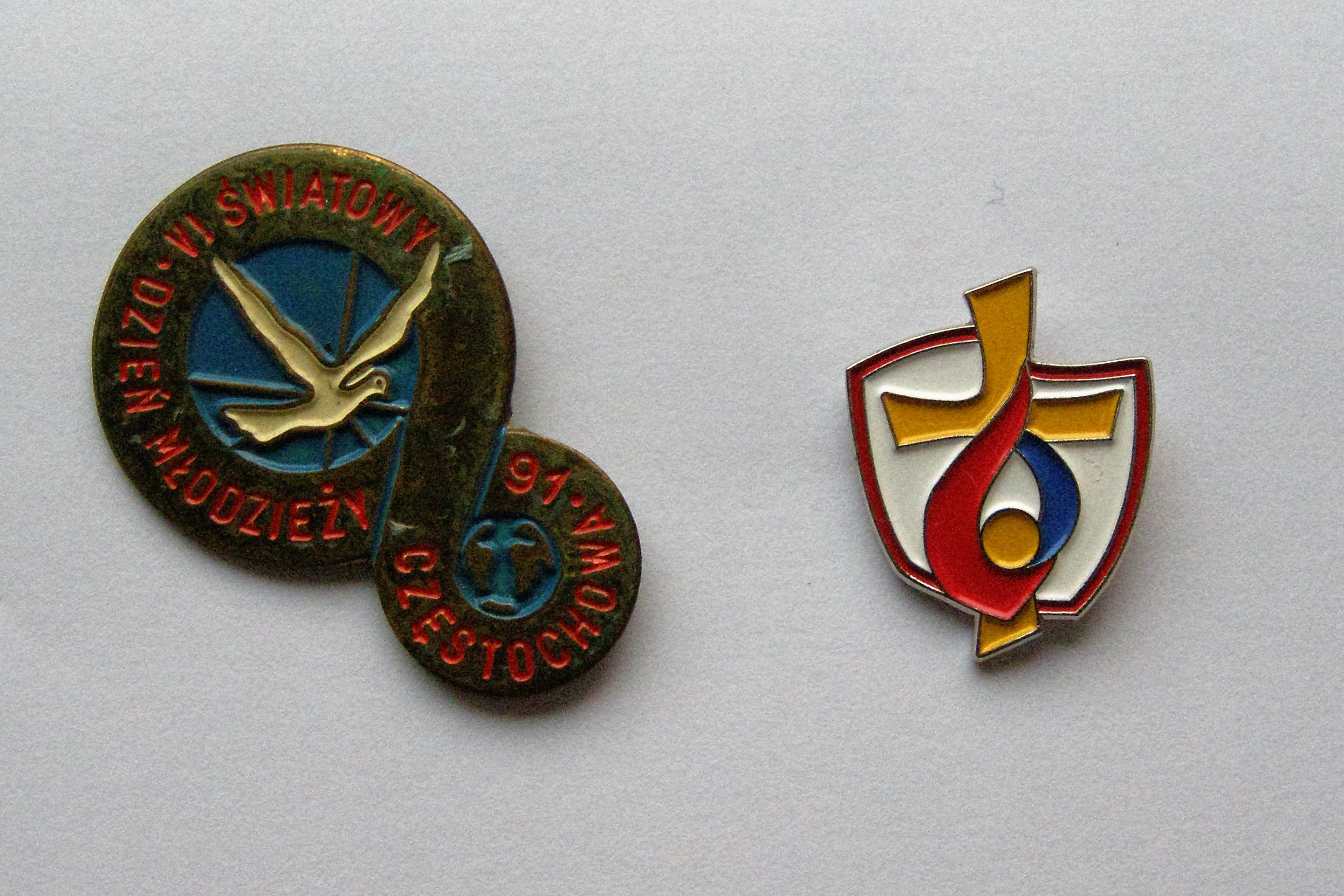
Badges with symbols of World Youth Day 1991 and 2016

=== Preparations ===
More than 70 priests took part in a meeting on 10 September 2013 dedicated to the spiritual aspects of the preparations to WYD Kraków 2016. They represented all Polish dioceses and the local organizing committee in Kraków. Bishop Henryk Tomasik, national coordinator for youth pastoral care, presented main ideas that will take place before the actual WYD week, particularly the peregrination of the icon Salus Populi Romani and the WYD Cross. Young Poles will take over the Cross from young Brazilians on Palm Sunday, 13 April 2014. The Polish group will consist of 100 representatives of all the dioceses (approximately two persons per diocese). The following day the Cross starts its peregrination in the Archdiocese of Poznan. The Cross will stay in every diocese for 20 days and ends its pilgrimage in Kraków. The Cross will be present not only in churches and chapels but in schools, prisons for youth, and universities as well.

=== Pilgrimages ===
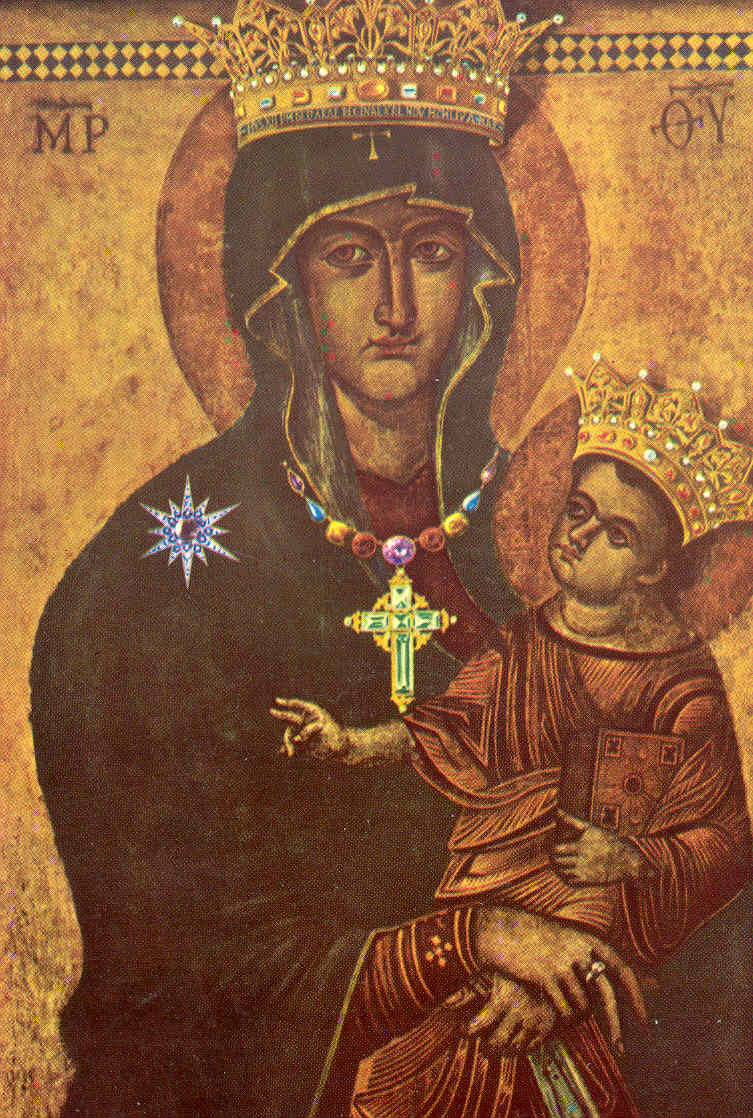
Salus Populi Romani

Pilgrimage of the Cross and Icon will take place through Poland and in other European countries: Belarus, the Czech Republic, Hungary, Italy, Latvia, Lithuania, Moldova, Romania, Russia, Slovakia, and Ukraine.

| Dates | Dioceses of Poland/Country |
|---|---|
| Departure: April 13, 2014 | Rome, Italy |
| April 14 – May 3, 2014 | Poznań |
| May 4–17, 2014 | Kalisz |
| May 18–30, 2014 | Włocławek |
| May 31 – June 5, 2014 | Rome, Italy |
| June 6–7, 2014 | Lednica |
| June 8–14, 2014 | Warsaw-Praga |
| June 15–28, 2014 | Siedlce |
| June 29 – July 12, 2014 | Belarus |
| July 13–26, 2014 | Lithuania |
| July 27 – August 9, 2014 | Latvia |
| August 10 – September 5, 2014 | Russia |
| September 6 – October 4, 2014 | Ukraine |
| October 5–18, 2014 | Moldova |
| October 19 – November 1, 2014 | Romania |
| November 2–15, 2014 | Hungary |
| November 16–29, 2014 | Slovakia |
| November 30 – December 13, 2014 | Czech Republic |
| December 14, 2014 – January 3, 2015 | Opole |
| January 4–17, 2015 | Katowice |
| January 18–31, 2015 | Gliwice |
| February 1–14, 2015 | Kielce |
| February 15–28, 2015 | Sosnowiec |
| March 1–14, 2015 | Bielsko-Biała |
| March 15–28, 2015 | Częstochowa |
| March 28–29, 2015 | Pelplin |
| March 30 – April 18, 2015 | Radom |
| April 19 – May 2, 2015 | Sandomierz |
| May 3–16, 2015 | Zamość |
| May 17–30, 2015 | Przemyśl |
| May 30–31, 2015 | Piekary Śląskie |
| June 1–11, 2015 | Rzeszów |
| June 12–14, 2015 | National Missionary Congress (Warszawa) |
| June 15–27, 2015 | Ełk |
| June 28 – July 11, 2015 | Białystok |
| July 12–25, 2015 | Łomża |
| July 26 – August 8, 2015 | Drohiczyn |
| August 9–21, 2015 | Warszawa Praga |
| August 22 – September 5, 2015 | Lublin |
| September 6–19, 2015 | Płock |
| September 19–20, 2015 | Biały Bór (Gr-kat. Wrocławsko-Gdańska) |
| September 20 – October 3, 2015 | Łowicz |
| October 4–17, 2015 | Łódź |
| October 18 – November 3, 2015 | Warsaw |
| November 4–14, 2015 | Olsztyn |
| November 15–28, 2015 | Elbląg |
| November 29 – December 12, 2015 | Gdańsk |
| December 13–26, 2015 | Pelplin |
| December 27, 2015 – January 9, 2016 | Toruń |
| January 10–23, 2016 | Bydgoszcz |
| January 24 – February 6, 2016 | Koszalin |
| February 7–20, 2016 | Szczecin |
| February 21 – March 5, 2016 | Zielona Góra |
| March 6–19, 2016 | Legnica |
| March 20 – April 2, 2016 | Świdnica |
| April 3–16, 2016 | Wrocław |
| April 17–30, 2016 | Gniezno |
| May 1–14, 2016 | Tarnów |
| May 15–19, 2016 | Gr-kat. Przemysko-Warszawska |
| May 20 – July 31, 2016 | Kraków |

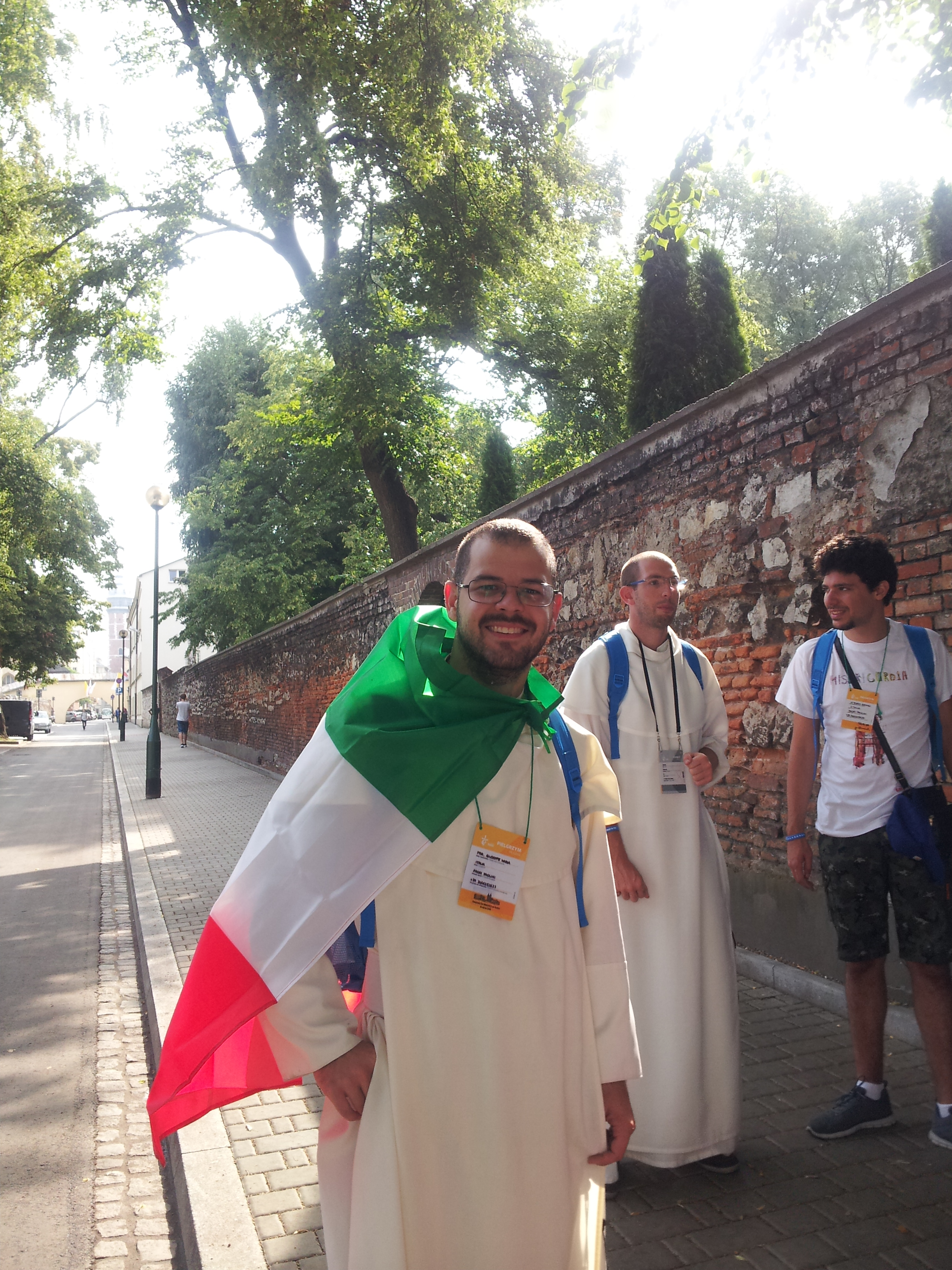
Br Joseph Maria OSPPE at World Youth Day 2016 in Kraków, Poland

=== "Ticket for your Brother" ===
A new project called "Ticket for your Brother" is aimed at helping young people from former communist countries to take part in the events by buying small souvenirs, icons, and gadgets of WYD.

=== Monthly mass ===
In the Holy Cross Church, in Kraków, there is a Holy Mass solemnly celebrated at 6:00 PM, every 16th day of each month, for the intention of good spiritual preparations of WYD Kraków 2016. It is an initiative of the Kraków Archdiocese's WYD coordination headquarters office, whose main aim is to prepare the archdiocesan youth for the future events in 2016.

=== Papal visit itinerary ===
The Holy See has released the official schedule for Pope Francis's Apostolic Journey to Poland for World Youth Day 2016 in Kraków.

== Organisation ==
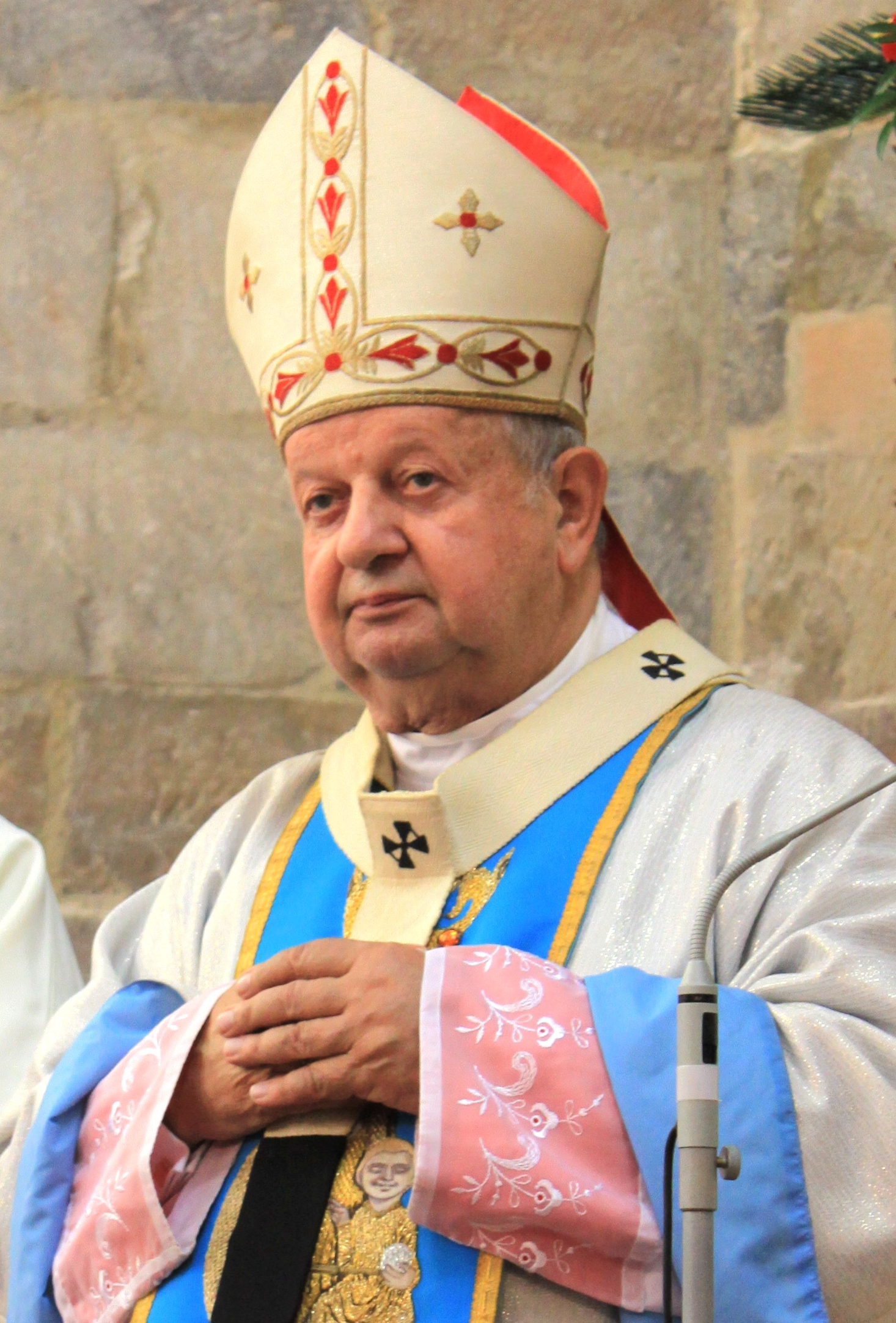
Archbishop of Kraków Cardinal Stanisław Dziwisz, head of the organisational committee and the coordination of the local preparations in Kraków, Poland

=== Committee ===
The Polish diocesan bishops (ordinaries) decided on 26 August 2013 during their meeting in Częstochowa to form the Polish Organizing Committee for the Papal Apostolic Journey WYD 2016. Cardinal Stanisław Dziwisz was elected as head of the committee and the coordination of the local preparations in Kraków are to be led by his auxiliary bishop Damian Muskus. The organising committee consists also of Archbishop Józef Michalik, President of the Polish Bishops Conference, Archbishop Emeritus Józef Kowalczyk of the Archdiocese of Gniezno (the former Primate of Poland), Cardinal Kazimierz Nycz of the Archdiocese of Warsaw, Archbishop Stanisław Gądecki of the Archdiocese of Poznań, Archbishop Wacław Depo of the Archdiocese of Czestochowa, Bishop Wojciech Polak, the Secretary of the Polish Bishops Conference and Bishop of the Diocese of Radom, and Henryk Tomasik, the National Coordinator for Pastoral Care for the Youth. In the near future several working committees are expected to be formed and in every Polish diocese the official coordinators for WYD plan to be soon nominated.

=== Local committee in Kraków ===
Bishop Damian Muskus, head of the local organizational committee in Kraków, presented on 2 September 2013 the secretariate of the committee. The works of the secretariate are led by rev. Robert Tyrala and his deputy is rev. Mateusz Hosaja. Two more lay person will join the secretariate in the near future, one of them from the organizational committee of WYD in Rio de Janeiro 2013. The process of creating a complete local organizational committee will take approximately 1 month.

=== Online ===
The Archdiocese of Kraków has launched an official website for World Youth Day 2016: www.krakow2016.com

In addition, the event had a social media presence, with pages launched on Facebook, Twitter, Tumblr, Instagram, Google+, Ask, Weebly, Flickr and YouTube.

== Locations ==
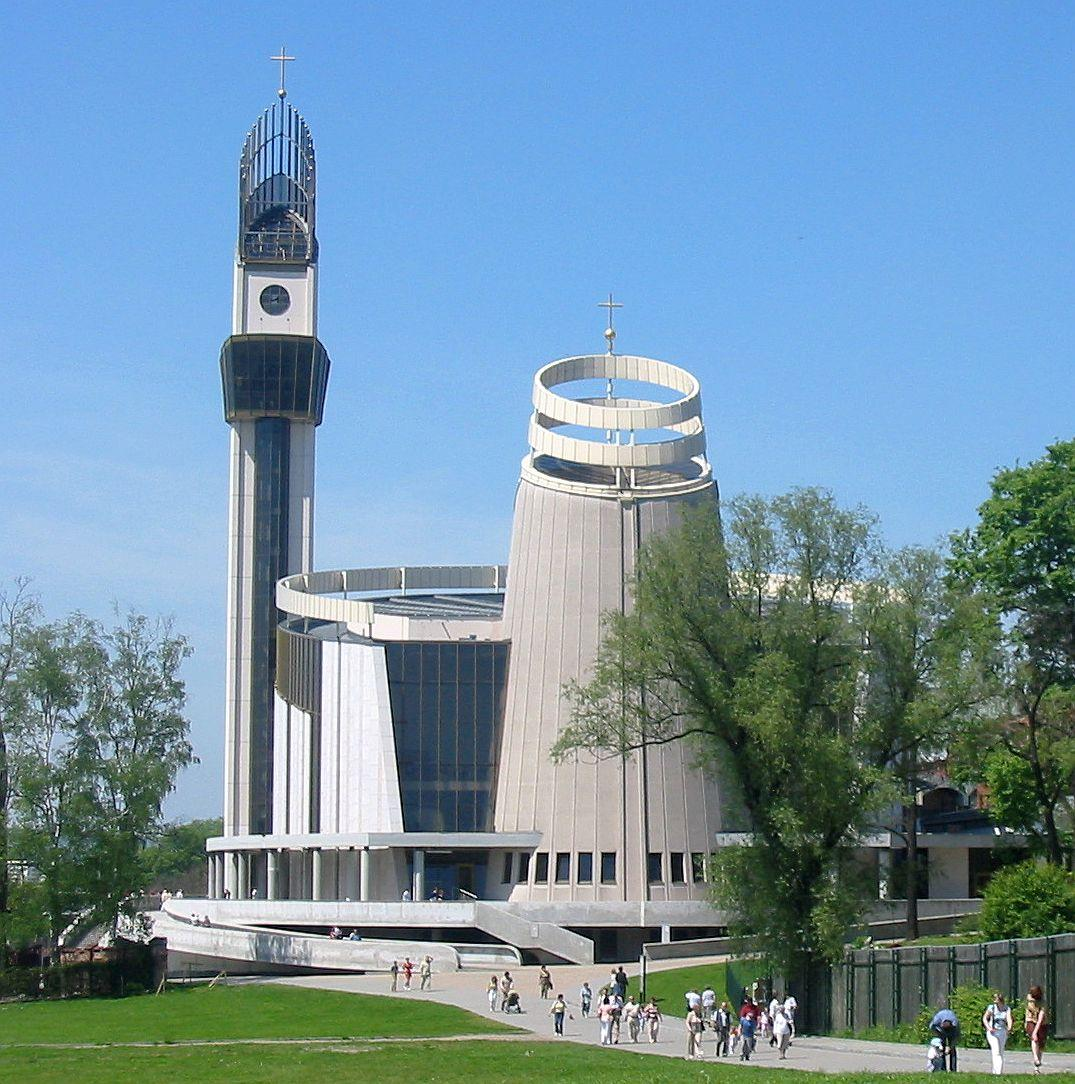
The Divine Mercy Shrine

Main events during the week were located at Blonia Park and Campus Misericordia (a field located in Brzegi, about 8 miles from the center of Kraków). Events at Blonia Park included the Opening Mass with Cardinal Dziwisz, the welcoming ceremony for Pope Francis, and the Stations of the Cross. The Vigil and Papal Mass were at the Campus Misericordia.

Sites were set up around the city to provide catechesis days leading up to the main pilgrimage. These were organized by bishops' conferences and presented in various languages. The main catechesis center for Americans and many other English-speaking was the Tauron Arena, which had been dubbed the Mercy Centre for the week. Programming and logistical efforts for this location were led by the Knights of Columbus.

Additional locations throughout the city provided regular masses, adoration, confession, musical youth festivals, and opportunities to venerate the relics of saints.

== Legacy of Pope John Paul II ==
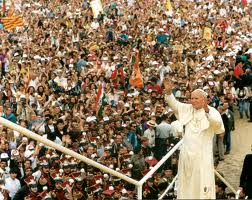
Pope John Paul II in Poland for World Youth Day 1991

Karol Wojtyła (Pope John Paul II) was born in Wadowice on 18 May 1920, but he identified Kraków as his homeland: "Here, in this land, I was born. Here, in Kraków, I spent the greater part of my life... Here, I received the grace of my priestly vocation... I was consecrated Bishop in the Cathedral of Wawel."

World Youth Day began with Pope John Paul II's invitation to young people in 1984 to come to Rome for Palm Sunday. More than 300,000 turned out for the celebration. The following year – 1985 – coincided with the United Nations International Year of Youth. Then on December 20, the Pope announced the first official WYD meeting for 1986. The 2016 World Youth Day in Kraków marked thirty years since the first official World Youth Day gathering.

World Youth Day played a special role in John Paul II's papacy, and both Pope Benedict XVI and Pope Francis have carried on the World Youth Days instituted by John Paul II – as a symbol of hope for young people.
