= Zygmunt Zimowski =

Polish prelate

His Excellency Zygmunt Zimowski
- President of the Pontifical Council for Pastoral Assistance to Health Care Workers
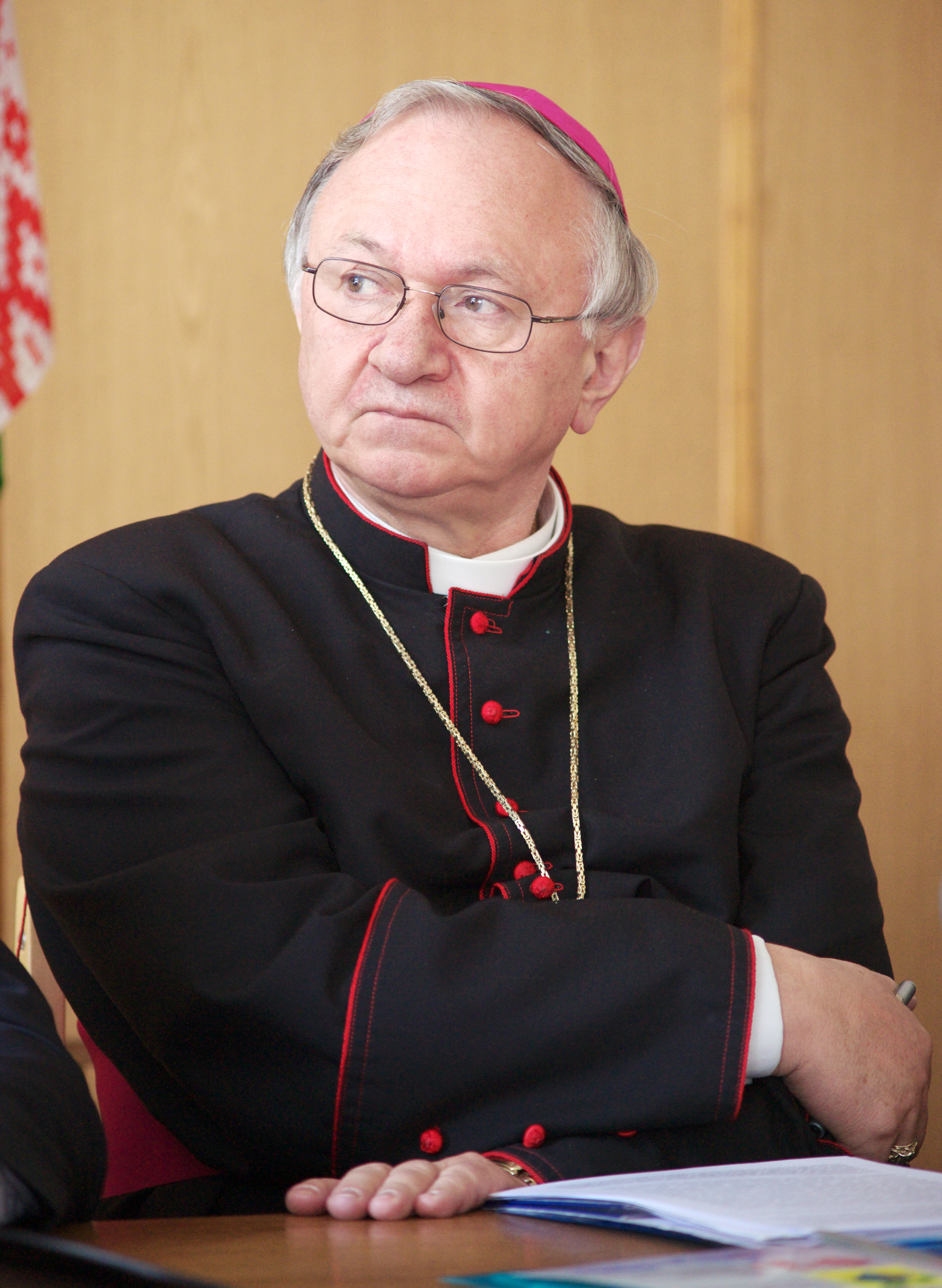
- Archbishop Zimowski in 2010
- Appointed: 18 April 2009
- Term ended: 12 July 2016
- Predecessor: Javier Lozano Barragán
- Previous post: Bishop of Radom (2002–2009)

Orders
- Ordination: 27 May 1973 by Jerzy Karol Ablewicz
- Consecration: 25 May 2002 by Joseph Ratzinger

Personal details
- Born: 7 April 1949 Kupienin, Poland
- Died: 13 July 2016 (aged 67) Dąbrowa Tarnowska, Poland
- Denomination: Roman Catholic

Styles of Zygmunt Zimowski
- Reference style: The Most Reverend
- Spoken style: Your Excellency
- Religious style: Monsignor

Zygmunt Zimowski (7 April 1949 – 13 July 2016) was a Polish prelate of the Roman Catholic Church. Archbishop Zimowski had served until his death in July 2016 as President of the Pontifical Council for the Pastoral Care of Health Care Workers, having been head of that office since his appointment by Pope Benedict XVI on 18 April 2009. He previously served as bishop of Radom from 2002 until 2009.

== Biography ==
Zimowski was born in Kupienin, Poland, located in the Roman Catholic Diocese of Tarnów. He was ordained a priest on 27 May 1973, and incardinated in Tarnów. He received a Licentiate in Dogmatic Theology from the Catholic University of Lublin. He continued his studies and subsequently received his Doctorate in Dogmatic Theology from the Faculty of Theology at the Leopold-Franzens University of Innsbruck. On 1 February 1983 he entered the service of the Congregation for the Doctrine of the Faith, where he remained until elevated to the episcopate. He was appointed Chaplain of His Holiness on 14 April 1988 and Prelate of Honour on 10 July 1999.

He was Postulator of some processes of beatification and canonization. He taught ecclesiology at the Catholic University of Lublin and at the Cardinal Stefan Wyszyński University in Warsaw and is the author of 120 publications, 40 pastoral letters and some books and several articles.

He participated in the preparation of the Catechism of the Catholic Church and worked with the Polish section of Radio Vatican.

On 28 March 2002, Zimowski was appointed Bishop of the Roman Catholic Diocese of Radom, and was consecrated in the Cathedral of Radom on 25 May 2002 by the Cardinal Prefect of the Congregation for the Doctrine of the Faith, Joseph Ratzinger, later Pope Benedict XVI. In the Polish Bishops' Conference, he held the following positions: President of the Episcopal Commission for the Doctrine of the Faith, Member of the Permanent Council, Delegate for the Pastoral Care of Migrants Poles, Member of the Ecumenical Commission and the Group for Contacts with the Polish Ecumenical Council, Member of the group of Bishops for the Pastoral Care for Radio Maria, and Member of the Polish Society of Mariology.

== Curia service ==
He remained Bishop of Radom until his appointment as the President of the Pontifical Council for the Pastoral Care of Health Care Workers in 2009. He was at the same time raised to the dignity of Archbishop ad personam. In addition to his native Polish, Archbishop Zimowski speaks Italian, German, English, French and Russian.

In January 2011 Archbishop Zimowski said that "Leprosy, in fact, after the upgrading of effective pharmacological therapies, witnessed a notable reduction of the lethal infection, but continues to cause suffering, diminution and social exclusion. Flourishing around it are ignorance, inequality and discrimination that, in turn, fuel its diffusion". He noted that from a statistical point of view, the countries that are most affected are in Asia, South America and Africa. India has the greatest number of affected people, followed by Brazil. Numerous cases are recorded also in Angola, Bangladesh, the Central African Republic, the Democratic Republic of the Congo, Indonesia, Madagascar, Mozambique, Nepal and Tanzania. He said that "Hansen's disease is an 'ancient' illness, but, because of this, no less devastating physically and also morally," Archbishop Zimowski reflected. "In all ages and civilizations, the fate of the leprosy sufferer is marginalization, being deprived of any type of social life, condemned to seeing his body disintegrate until death comes."

On 4 May 2011, Pope Benedict appointed him a member of the Congregation for the Causes of Saints.

On 18 May 2011, in a speech to the annual assembly of the World Health Organization in Geneva, Switzerland, he said that the world seemed "stalled in the status quo where the rich people have higher levels of coverage, while most of the poor people miss out, and [even] those who do have access often incur high, sometimes catastrophic costs in paying for services and medicine." He raised objections to needle-exchange programs and called for increased funding for poor nations.

On 2 April 2012, World Autism Awareness Day, Archbishop Zimowski said that "The Church needs to address the alienation often surrounding those living with autism, especially children and young people, by coming to the aid of those affected". He added: "The church sees as impelling the task of placing herself at the side of these people – children and young people in particular – and their families, if not to break down these barriers of silence then at least to share in solidarity and prayer in their journey of suffering".

In May 2012 Archbishop Zimowski, as head of the Holy See delegation to the 65th World Health Assembly, reaffirmed the Holy See's support for Resolution WHA64.9 on "sustainable health financing structures and universal coverage," which urges member states to aim for affordable universal health care coverage and access for all citizens on the basis of equity and solidarity. Zimowski said "more countries, especially those with emerging economies, are moving towards universal coverage," thanks also to "good policies that promote equity. ... Therefore my delegation strongly believes that in the endeavor to promote universal coverage, fundamental values such as equity, human rights and social justice need to become explicit policy objectives". The archbishop made an appeal for high-income countries to show greater solidarity toward poorer nations in order to overcome funding shortfalls in health.

On 28 July 2012, Archbishop Zimowski was named a Member of the Congregation for Bishops by Pope Benedict XVI.

Zimowski died in Poland on 13 July 2016, while convalescing following treatment for pancreatic cancer.

Catholic Church titles
Preceded by Jan Chrapek	Bishop of Radom; 28 March 2002 – 18 April 2009	Succeeded by Henryk Tomasik
Preceded by Javier Cardinal Lozano Barragán	President of the Pontifical Council for the Pastoral Care of Health Care Workers; 18 April 2009 – 12 July 2016	Succeeded by vacant
