= Mateusz Szerszeń =

Polish Roman Catholic priest

Personal life
- Born: September 8, 1987 Tarnobrzeg, Poland

Religious life
- Religion: Roman Catholicism
- Ordination: 2014

Mateusz Szerszeń (born September 8, 1987, in Tarnobrzeg) is a Roman Catholic priest, and a member of the Congregation of Saint Michael the Archangel, as well as a spiritual director, writer, retreat leader, and columnist. Editor-in-chief of the bimonthly magazine about angels and spiritual life Któż jak Bóg and the English-language journal The Angels. Messengers from a Loving God.

== Biography ==
He comes from a borderland family, which was resettled from Milno in Podolia to Trzebież in the West Pomeranian Voivodeship in 1945.

He was born in Tarnobrzeg and attended a high school in Stalowa Wola (LO im. KEN). He joined the congregation of the Michaelite Fathers in 2006, and underwent novitiate in Pawlikowice. He completed theological studies at the Pontifical University of John Paul II in Krakow, and at the Theological Institute of the Missionary Priests, and was ordained a priest on May 24, 2014, at the Blessed Angelina Salawa Parish in Krakow.

After his ordination, he worked in several parishes in the London area in the Canadian province of Ontario. Since 2016, he served as a confessor at the Sanctuary of Saint Michael the Archangel in Monte Sant'Angelo, Italy, and later became the pastor of the Parish of Our Lady Queen of Angels in Warsaw.

He engages in publicistic activities and spiritual leadership. He leads retreats on angelic themes and the spirituality of Father Dolindo, and co-organizes spiritual-psychological sessions at Miejsce Piastowe. In 2022, he was appointed chaplain of the "Cross and Sword" community, which unites the officers of the Polish Armed Forces and their families.

Since 2020, he has been the editor of the bi-monthly magazine "Któż jak Bóg", and since 2023, he has served as the deputy editor-in-chief. In 2024, he assumed the position of editor-in-chief. He also publishes articles for the Aleteia portal and Nasz Dziennik newspaper. He collaborates with Michalineum Publishing House and the Temperance and Work Society. He runs a blog addressing spiritual topics and religious news. He is a member of the Catholic Journalists Association. He resides in Warsaw and is fluent in English and Italian.

== Publications ==
- Rozważania Drogi Krzyżowej, Wydawnictwo Michalineum (Michalineum Publishing House), Warszawa 2021
- Rozważania majowe, Wydawnictwo Michalineum, Warszawa 2021
- Rozważania czerwcowe, Wydawnictwo Michalineum, Warszawa 2021
- Rozważania różańcowe, Wydawnictwo Michalineum, Warszawa 2021
- Niesamowite Opowieści. Historie Biblijne, Wydawnictwo Michalineum, Warszawa 2022
- Ogień Słowa. Historie Biblijne, Wydawnictwo Michalineum, Warszawa 2023
- Niebiański modlitewnik, Towarzystwo Powściągliwość i Praca (Temperance and Work Society), Warszawa 2022
- Wielkie Zawierzenie Świętemu Michałowi Archaniołowi, Towarzystwo Powściągliwość i Praca, Warszawa 2023
- Minuta Mądrości. Refleksje o życiu i wierze, Wydawnictwo Michalineum, Warszawa 2023
- The Special Entrustment to St Michael the Archangel, Towarzystwo Powściągliwość i Praca, Marki 2023
- Anielskie Tajemnice, Towarzystwo Powściągliwość i Praca, Warszawa 2024
- Poradnik duchowy. Praktyczny przewodnik po sztuce kierownictwa duchowego, Wydawnictwo Michalineum, Warszawa 2024
- Post św. Michała Archanioła, Towarzystwo Powściągliwość i Praca, Warszawa 2024
- Królowa Aniołów, Towarzystwo Powściągliwość i Praca, Warszawa 2025
- Sekrety Serca, Towarzystwo Powściągliwość i Praca, Warszawa 2025
