= Jan Chrapek =

Polish Roman Catholic bishop

Jan Chrapek CSMA
- Bishop of Radom
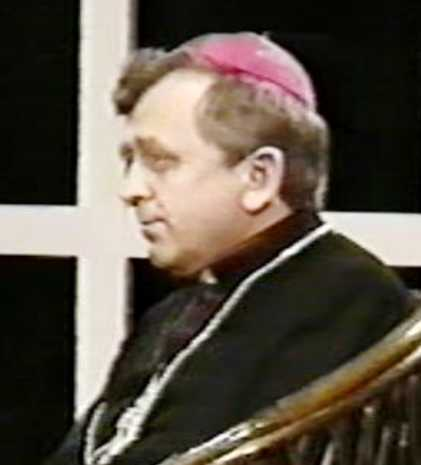
- Previous posts: Auxiliary bishop of Toruń (1994 – 1999); Auxiliary bishop of Drohiczyn (1992 – 1994); Titular bishop of Cataquas (1992 – 1999)

Orders
- Ordination: 3 May 1975 by Ignacy Tokarczuk
- Consecration: 5 June 1992 by Józef Kowalczyk

Personal details
- Born: 18 July 1948 Józefina
- Died: 18 October 2001 (aged 53) Siekluki
- Motto: Quis ut Deus

Jan Chrapek CSMA (18 July 1948 – 18 October 2001) was a Polish Roman Catholic bishop of the Diocese of Radom.

== Biography ==
Chrapek was born in 1948 to Józef and Genowefa Chrapek (née Borecka). He began attending a minor seminary of the Congregation of Saint Michael the Archangel at Miejsce Piastowe in 1962. He took his first vows in 1966 and his perpetual vows on 26 August 1969. After taking his perpetual vows, he began to study philosophy and theology at the Instytut Teologiczny Księży Misjonarzy. He was ordained a priest by Ignacy Tokarczuk at Miejsce Piastowe on 3 May 1975, and received a magister degree from the John Paul II Catholic University of Lublin in pastoral theology in 1976 and a doctoral degree in 1979.

Between 1984 and 1986, Chrapek served as the editor for the monthly newspaper Powściągliwość i Praca. In 1986, Chrapek was elected Superior General of the Congregation of Saint Michael the Archangel, which he served as until his nomination as bishop. On 25 March 1992, Pope John Paul II appointed Chrapek as auxiliary bishop of Drohiczyn and titular bishop of Cataquas; he was consecrated by Józef Kowalczyk, with co-consecration from Kazimierz Świątek and Edward Kisiel, on 5 June 1992 in Drohiczyn. He was appointed auxiliary bishop of Toruń on 20 June 1994 and bishop of Radom on 28 June 1999. He assumed the position of bishop of Radom on 21 August 1999. He died on 18 October 2001 following a car accident near Siekluki while returning to Radom from Warsaw.
