= Któż jak Bóg =

Polish angel-themed magazine

- Editor: Mateusz Szerszeń
- Categories: Religious magazine
- Frequency: Bi-monthly
- Publisher: Towarzystwo Powściągliwość i Praca (Temperance and Work Society)
- Founded: January/February 1993
- Country: Poland
- Based in: Marki, Poland
- Language: Polish
- Website: kjb24.pl
- ISSN: 1230-4611

Któż jak Bóg is a Polish bi-monthly religious-themed magazine published by the Temperance and Work Society (Polish: Towarzystwo Powściągliwość i Praca) in cooperation with the Congregation of Saint Michael the Archangel.

== History ==
"Któż jak Bóg" is a magazine focusing on angelic themes and spiritual life, covering topics such as angelology, spirituality, biblical studies, culture, and art. The bi-monthly publication began in January 1993, following the decision of the general chapter of the Michaelite Fathers in 1992 to create a new periodical. The first editor-in-chief was Father Marian Polak.

From 2004 to 2024, the editor-in-chief of the magazine has been Father Piotr Prusakiewicz, with Father Mateusz Szerszeń serving as the deputy editor-in-chief. In 2018, the bi-monthly publication was awarded the Little Phoenix Prize. In 2024, Father Mateusz Szerszeń assumed the role of the editor-in-chief.

The magazine is mainly devoted to topics related to angels. It presents articles and testimonies about the relationships between angels and humans, as well as how angels serve in fulfilling God's purposes. It also addresses topics related to leading a spiritual life, prayer, spiritual direction, biblical exegesis, demonology, Church history, and the cult of angels. The name of the magazine refers to St. Michael the Archangel.

In the magazine, there are regular sections authored by:

- Fr. Mateusz Szerszeń CSMA: Meet St. Michael
- Fr. Edward Staniek: In the Light of Revealed Truth
- Fr. Henryk Skoczylas CSMA: The Psalter – Book of Prayer and Life
- Herbert Oleschko: In the Angelic Circle
- Tomasz Powyszyński: From a Sinner's Notebook
- Fr. Wojciech Węgrzyniak: Priest's Reflections
- Fr. Michał Lubowicki: Seeing an Angel
- Roman Zając: The Biblical Scholar Answers
- Fr. Zbigniew Baran CSMA: The Exorcist Answers

The average circulation of the magazine is eight thousand copies sold. The editorial team of the bi-monthly magazine also runs a YouTube channel with the same name.

== See also ==
- List of magazines in Poland
