= Piotr Prusakiewicz =

Roman catholic priest

Personal life
- Born: February 12, 1963 Toruń, Poland

Religious life
- Religion: Roman Catholicism
- Ordination: May 1990

Piotr Prusakiewicz (born February 12, 1963, in Toruń) is a Roman Catholic priest, and a member of the Congregation of Saint Michael the Archangel.

== Biography ==
He belonged to the Parish of St. Michael the Archangel in Toruń. After passing his high school graduation exam, he entered the monastery, and then, after formation and studies in Krakow, he became a priest in May 1990. He holds a master's degree in psychology, and a canonical bachelor's degree in theology of spirituality (both from the Cardinal Stefan Wyszyński University in Warsaw).

He served as a vicar at the Parish of the Holy Spirit in Krosno (1990–1992), chaplain of the Congregation of the Sisters of Our Lady of Mercy (1993–1996), Prefect of the Higher Seminary of the Michaelite Fathers in Krakow (1996–1999), and Member of the General Council of the Congregation of St. Michael the Archangel in Marki (1998–2004).

In 2004, he was appointed as the General Animator of the Knighthood of St. Michael the Archangel, succeeding Father Marian Polak. He is a Michaelite, a member of the Congregation of Saint Michael the Archangel.

He was the editor-in-chief of the bi-monthly magazine "Któż jak Bóg" (2004–2024), and the quarterly publication "The Angels Magazine", the issues of which are held in the National Library in Warsaw. He is the president of the Temperance and Work Society (Polish: Powściągliwość i Praca).

He is a retreat leader and a people's missionary. He conducts retreats on angelic themes and on Divine Mercy. He is known for his passion for speedway sports. He is the chaplain of the KS Toruń club. He is fluent in English and Italian.

== Publications ==
- The Majestic Splendour of St Michael the Archangel, Towarzystwo Powściągliwość i Praca (Temperance and Work Society), 2022 (ISBN 978-83-938973-8-4)
- Dwie mądrości, Towarzystwo Powściągliwość i Praca (Temperance and Work Society), 2019 (ISBN 9788393897346)
- Pieśni pełne Ducha. Hymny św. Pawła, Towarzystwo Powściągliwość i Praca (Temperance and Work Society), 2023 [co-author] (ISBN 978-83-967583-0-9)
- Któż jak Bóg – dwumiesięcznik o aniołach i życiu duchowym, [editor-in-chief Piotr Prusakiewicz], 2012—
- The Angels – kwartalnik poświęcony tematyce aniołów, [editor-in-chief Piotr Prusakiewicz], 2010— (ISSN: 2081-5077)
