= Marek Solarczyk =

Polish Roman Catholic Bishop of Radom

The Most Reverend Marek Solarczyk
- Bishop of Radom
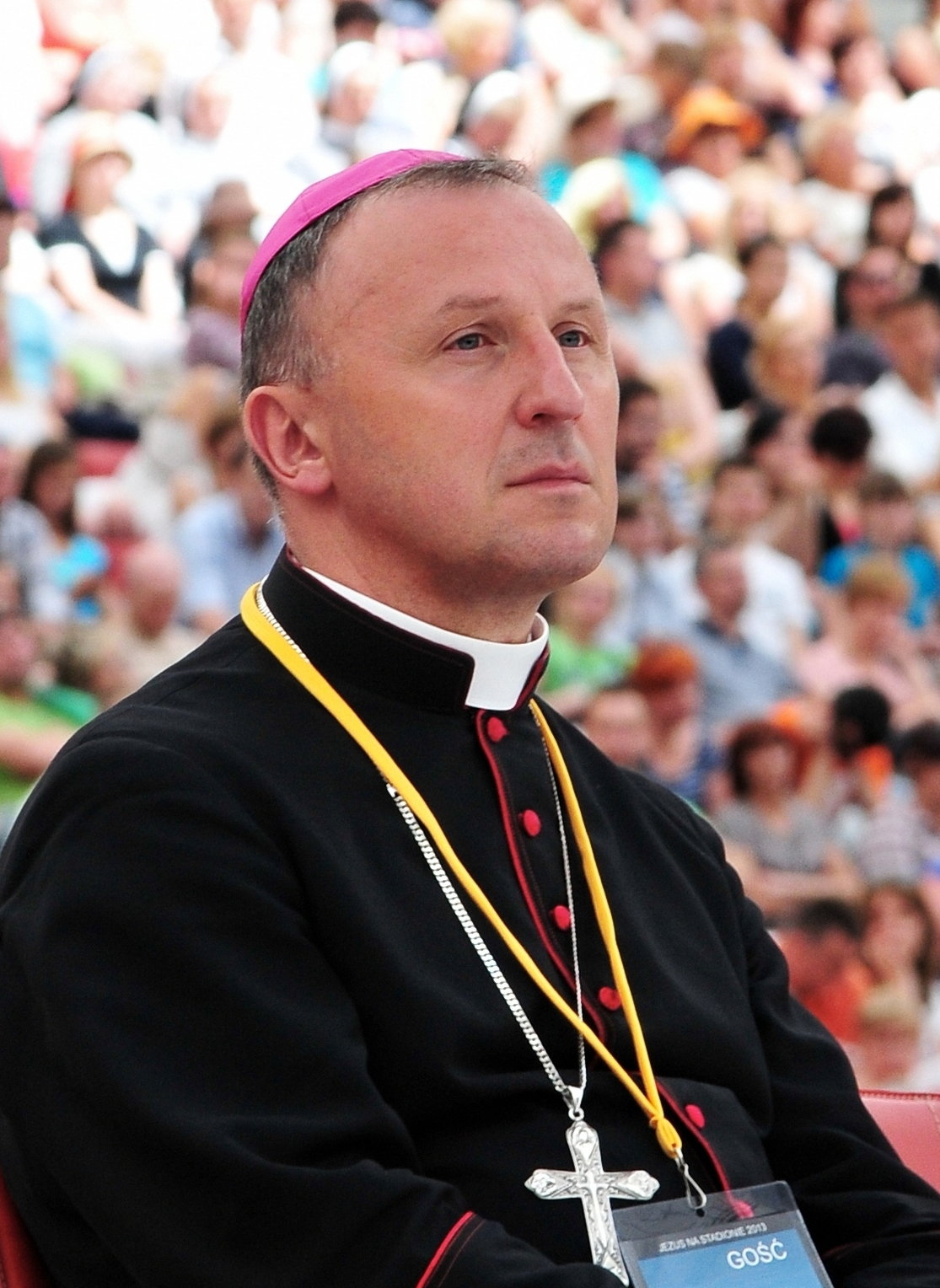
- See: Radom
- Appointed: 4 January 2021
- Predecessor: Henryk Tomasik
- Previous posts: Auxiliary Bishop of Warszawa-Praga (2011-2021); Titular Bishop of Hólar (2011–2021)

Orders
- Ordination: 28 May 1992 by Kazimierz Romaniuk
- Consecration: 19 November 2011 by Henryk Hoser

Personal details
- Born: Marek Solarczyk; 13 April 1967 (age 59) Wołomin, Wołomin County, Poland
- Denomination: Roman Catholic
- Motto: Omnia possibilia credenti
- Coat of arms

Marek Solarczyk (born 13 April 1967) is a Polish Roman Catholic prelate and bishop of Radom.

== Formation ==
A native of Wołomin, in east-central Poland, he studied at the Metropolitan Higher Seminary in Warsaw and received his priestly ordination in 1992 at the St. Florian's Cathedral, being incardinated in the Diocese of Warszawa-Praga. He finished his doctorate in Church History in The Catholic Academy of Warsaw in 1999, and acted as a professor on the subject.

== Bishop ==
After a brief tenure as parish priest of St. Florian's Cathedral (2009-2011) he was named Auxiliary Bishop of Warszawa-Praga by Pope Benedict XVI on 8 October 2011, receiving the titular see of Hólar, Iceland. His consecration took place at St. Florian's Cathedral on 19 November 2011. On 4 January 2021, Pope Francis appointed him to succeed Henryk Tomasik as Bishop of Radom. He assumed control of the diocese on 8 January 2021.
