= Diocese of Radom =

Roman Catholic diocese in Poland

Coordinates: 51°23′49″N 21°09′22″E

Diocese of Radom Dioecesis Radomensis Diecezja Radomska

Catholic
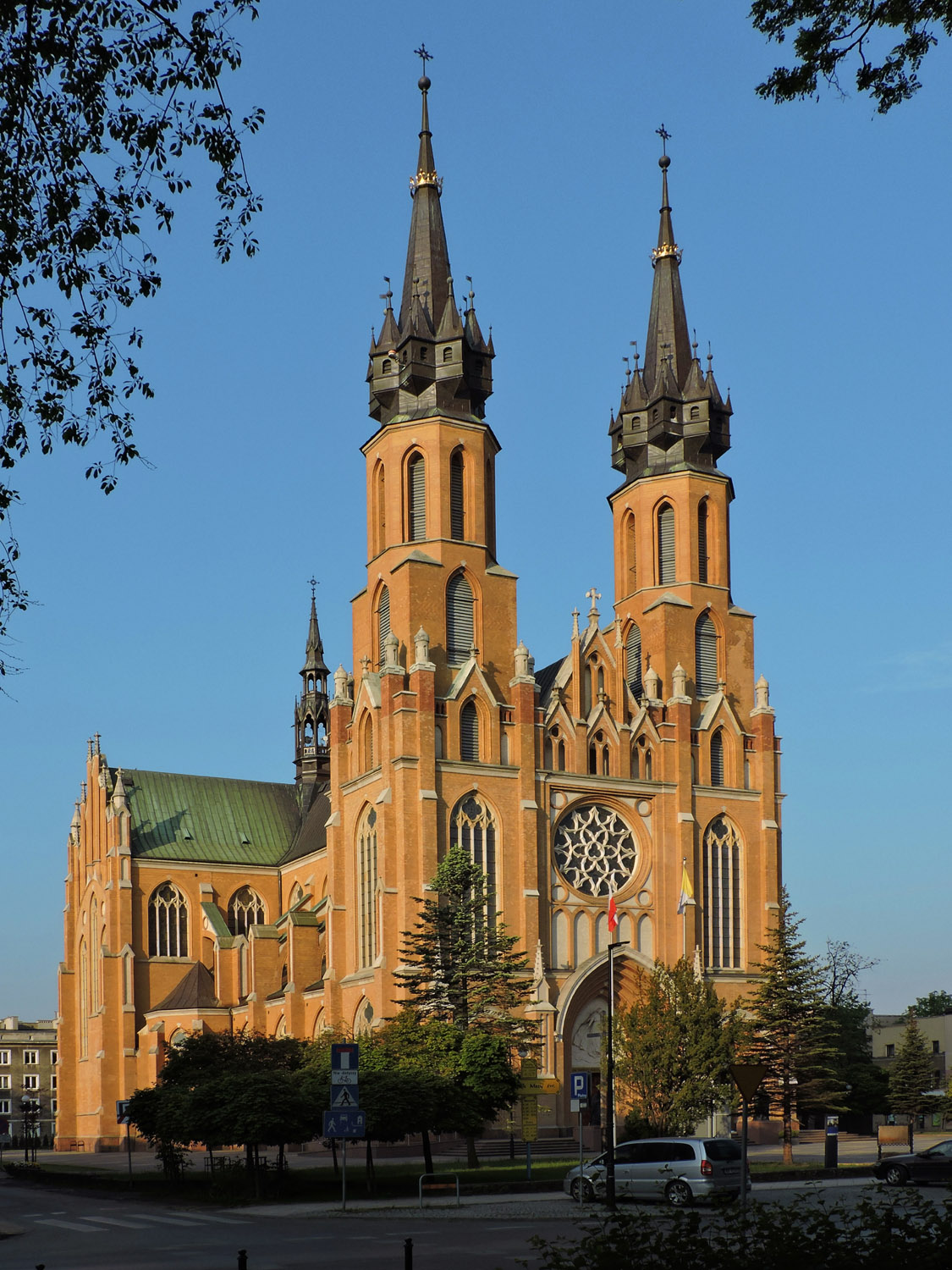
- The Cathedral of the Virgin Mary in Radom

Location
- Country: Poland
- Metropolitan: Częstochowa

Statistics
- Area: 8,000 km^{2} (3,100 sq mi)
- Population: Total; Catholics: (as of 2021); 855,286; 836,036 (97.7%)

Information
- Rite: Latin Rite
- Established: 25 March 1992
- Cathedral: Katedra Opieki Najświętszej Marii Panny (The Cathedral of the Virgin Mary)

Current leadership
- Pope: Leo XIV
- Bishop: Marek Solarczyk
- Metropolitan Archbishop: Wacław Depo
- Bishops emeritus: Henryk Marian Tomasik

Map
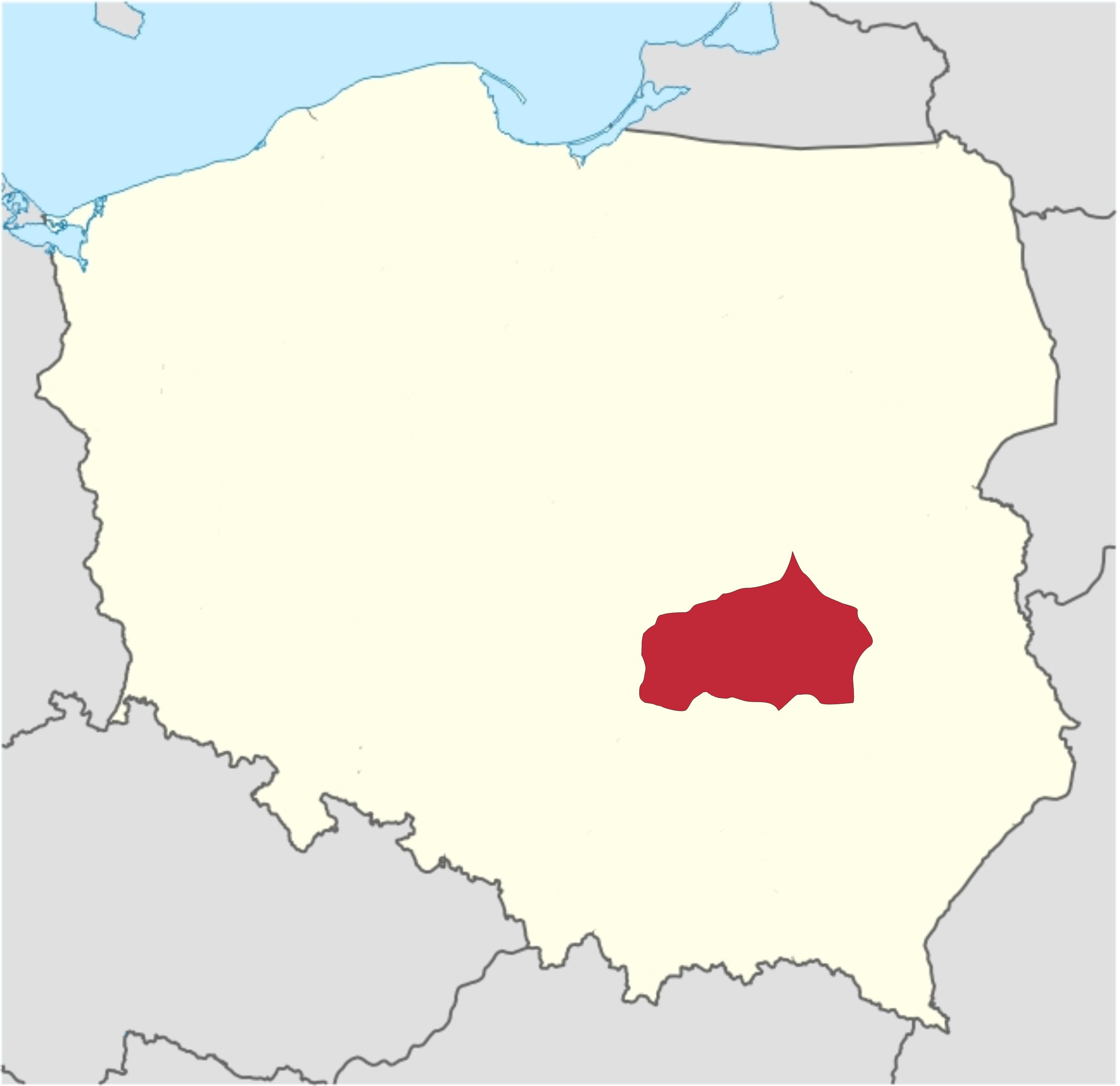

Website
- Website of the Diocese

The Diocese of Radom (Latin: Dioecesis Radomensis) is a Latin Church diocese of the Catholic Church located in the city of Radom in the ecclesiastical province of Częstochowa in Poland.

== History ==
- March 25, 1992: Established as Diocese of Radom from the Diocese of Sandomierz – Radom

== Special churches ==
- Minor Basilicas:
  - Bazylika św. Filipa Neri i św. Jana Chrzciciela kk. Filipinów
    (Basilica of St. Philip Neri and St. John the Baptist) in Studzianna
  - Bazylika św. Kazimierza (Basilica of St. Casimir), Radom
- Cathedral of the Protection of the Blessed Virgin Mary in Radom

== Leadership ==
- Bishops of Radom (Roman rite)
  - Bishop Edward Henryk Materski (25 March 1992 – 28 June 1999)
  - Bishop Jan Chrapek, C.S.M.A. (28 June 1999 – 18 October 2001)
  - Bishop Zygmunt Zimowski (28 March 2002 – 18 April 2009)
  - Bishop Henryk Tomasik (16 October 2009 – 4 January 2021)
  - Bishop Marek Solarczyk (appointed 4 January 2021)
- Auxiliary bishops of Radom
  - Bishop Adam Odzimek

== See also ==
- Roman Catholicism in Poland

== Sources ==
- GCatholic.org
- Catholic Hierarchy
- Diocese website
