= Church of Mariahilf =

Church in Vienna, Austria

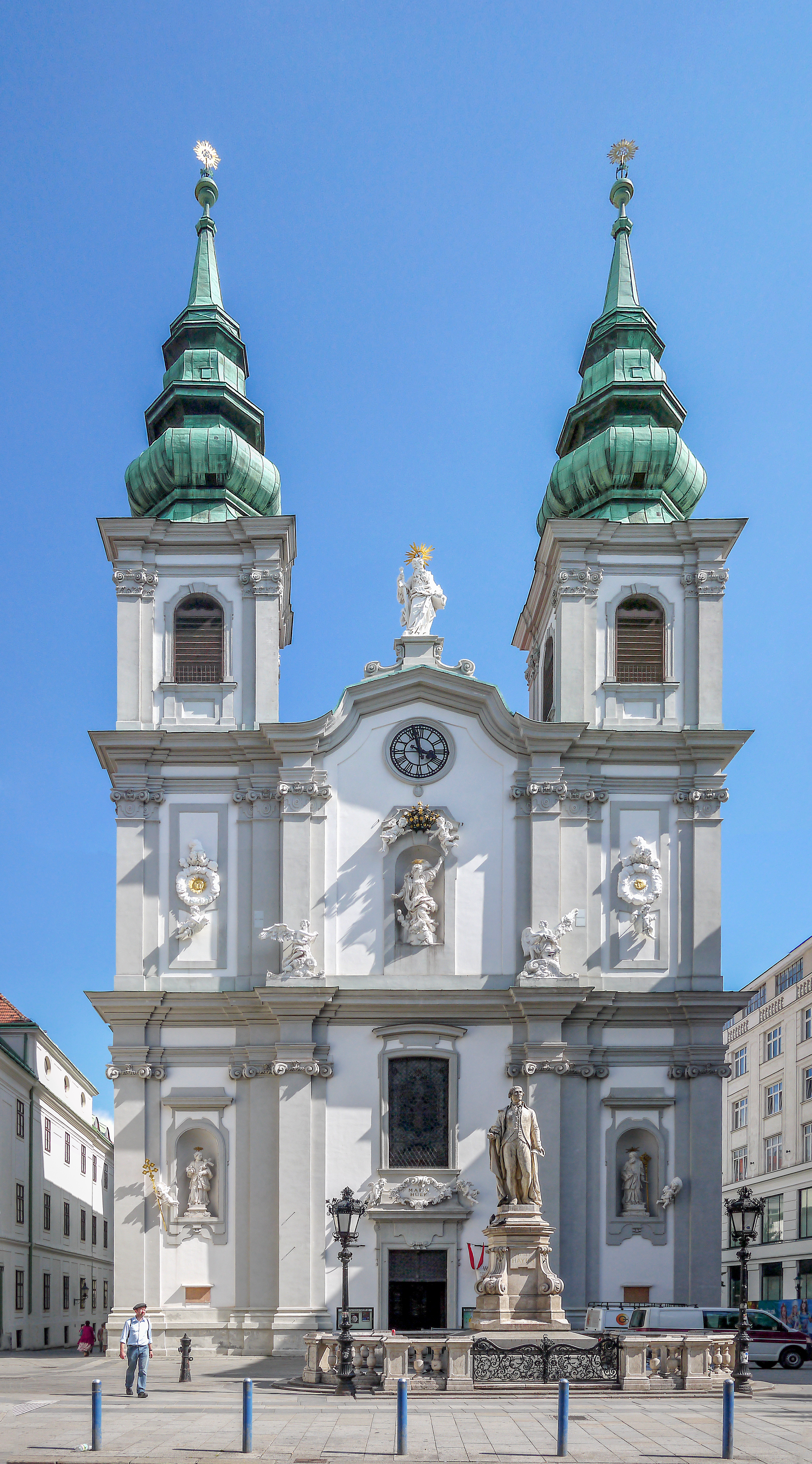
- Façade and main entrance towards Mariahilfer Straße

- Location within Vienna Location within Austria

Religion
- Affiliation: Catholic Church
- Leadership: P. Kazimierz Tomaszewski CSMA
- Year consecrated: 1730

Location
- Location: Vienna, Austria
- Coordinates: 48.1988°N 16.3532°E

Architecture
- Architects: Franz Jänggl, Sebastiano Carlone
- Type: Church
- Style: Baroque
- Groundbreaking: 1711
- Completed: 1715

Specifications
- Direction of façade: NWbN
- Length: 55 meters (180 ft)
- Width: 25 meters (82 ft)
- Width (nave): 14 meters (46 ft)

Website
- www.pfarremariahilf.at

The Church of Mariahilf is a Baroque parish church and the church of the Congregation of Saint Michael the Archangel (Congregatio Sancti Michaëlis Archangeli) in Vienna. It is located in Vienna's 6th district (Mariahilf).

The parish church of Mariahilf was built by Sebastiano Carlone in 1686–1689, but redesigned by Franz Jänggl (1711–1715).

== Interior ==
The church has six chapels and is decorated with frescoes in trompe-l'œil made by Johann Hauzinger and Franz Xaver Strattmann in 1759–1760, pupils of Paul Troger. The altar was made by J. G. Dorfmeister.

The organ was built in 1763 by the Austrian organ builder Johann Hencke (3 Dec 1697 Geseke- 24 September 1766 Vienna).

== Pulpit ==
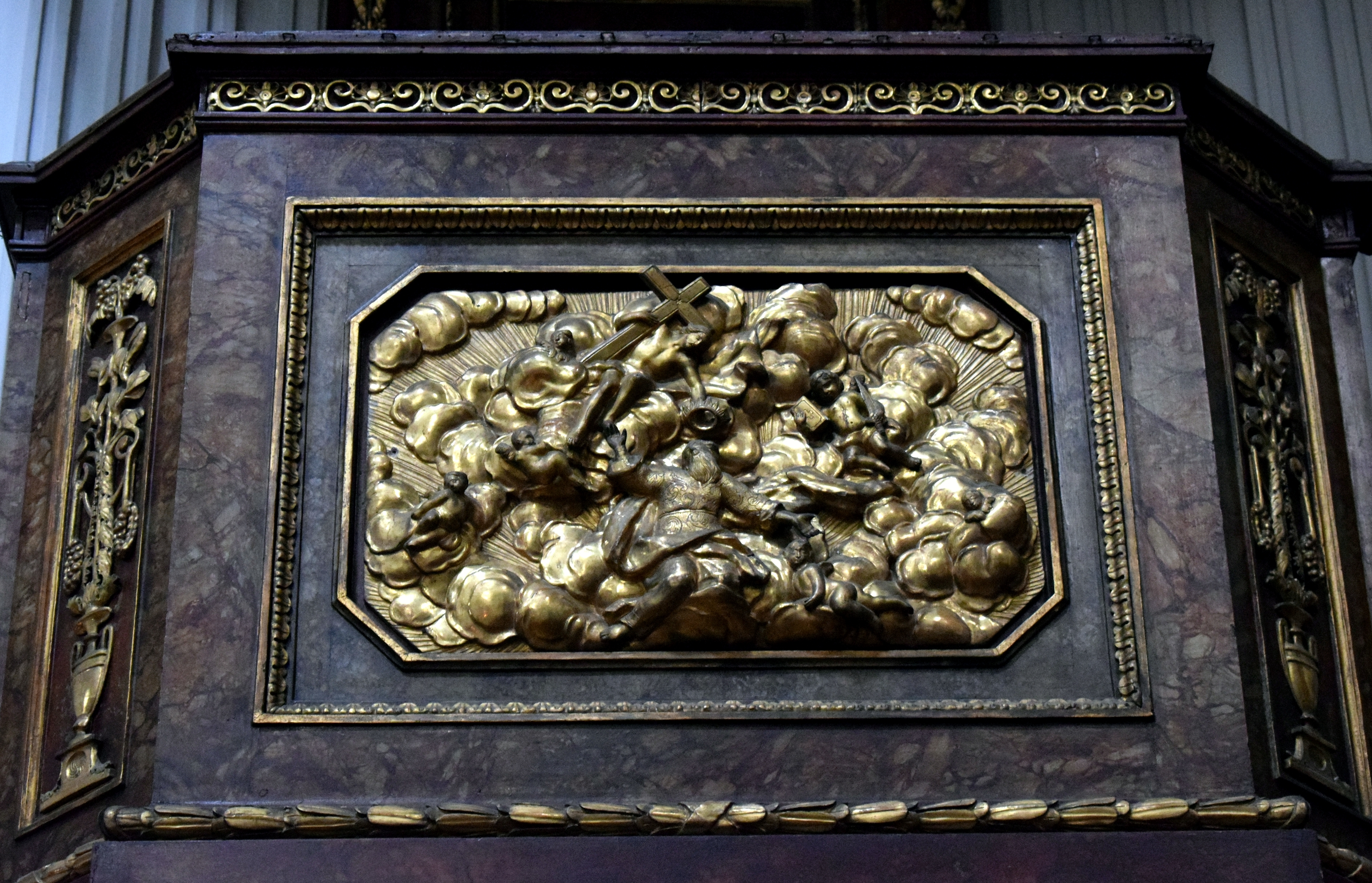
Christ crowning St Paul

The original pulpit was designed in 1720 by Antonio Beduzzi, an Italian architect working in Upper Austria and Lower Austria. It was remodelled in Classicizing late Baroque style in 1794. It is a wooden structure with gilt sculptures and decoration, the finishing of the surface imitates the appearance of polished marble, the colour scheme is brown and gold. The abat-voix is larger than the lower part creating a top-heavy effect. The carved floral and vegetal decoration is particularly rich on the door and the gable of the abat-voix. On the front of the balustrade there is gilt relief showing "Christ crowning St Paul in Heaven with the crown of martyrdom". The main figures of the scene are surrounded by cherubs among thick clouds, one of them holding a book and a knife. The iconography could be accounted for by the fact that St Paul was the patron saint of the Barnabites. On the shorter sides there are two groups of carved symbols, among the first the Table of Showbread with menorah, book, two torches and branches, among the second the Tablets of Stone, book, cross, two torches and branches. These are illustrating the synthesis of the Old and the New Testament. The abat-voix is crowned with a lively Baroque sculpture group of playful cherubs holding symbols of the faith, a cross, an anchor, a chalice and a flaming heart.

== Gallery ==
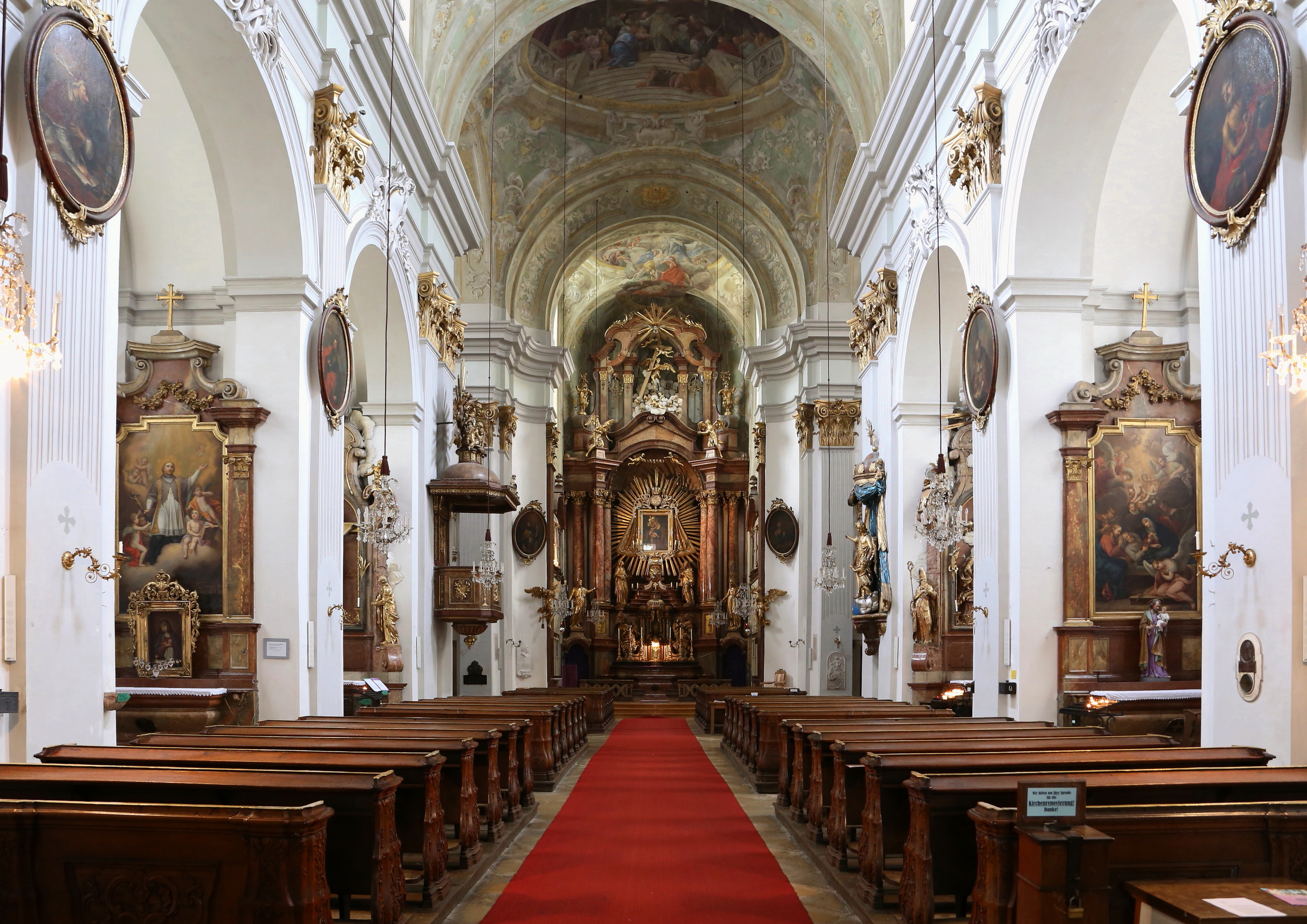
Interior view

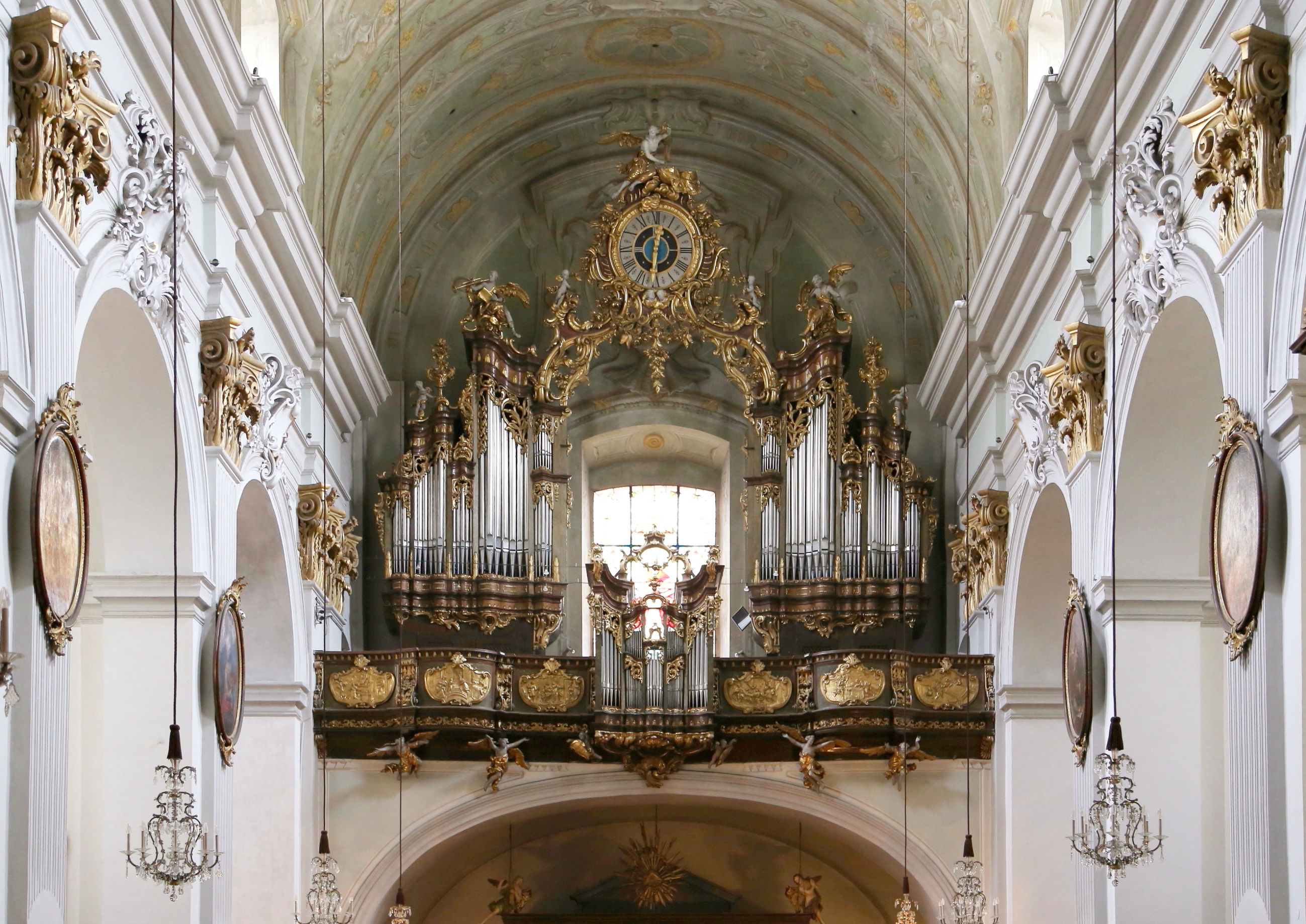
Organ built by Johann Hencke (1763)

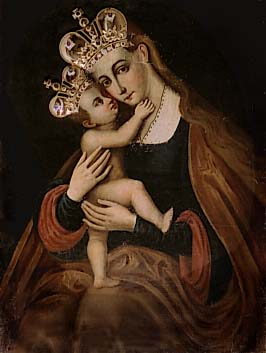
Icon of Virgin Mary Mariahilf

Plan of the Church of Mariahilf

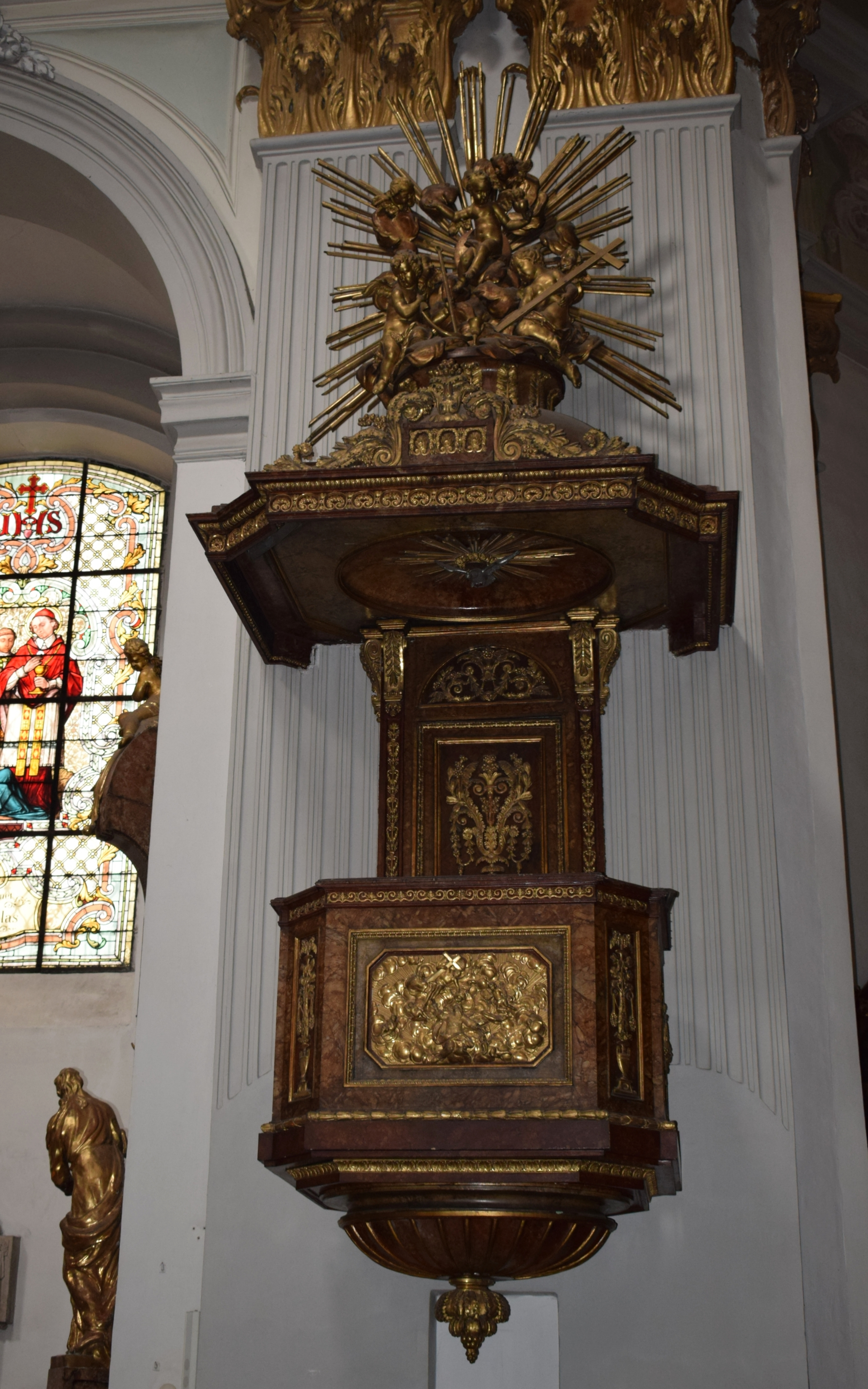
The late Baroque pulpit

Altar

== See also ==
- Roman Catholic Marian churches
