= Bronisław Markiewicz =

Polish Roman Catholic priest

Blessed Bronisław Markiewicz S.D.B.
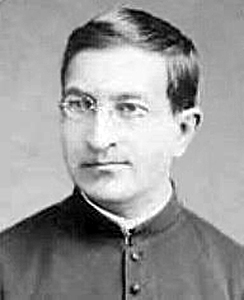
- Markiewicz as a priest.

Priest
- Born: 13 July 1842; Pruchnik, Podkarpackie, Kingdom of Galicia and Lodomeria, Austrian Empire
- Died: 29 January 1912 (aged 69); Miejsce Piastowe, Podkarpackie, Kingdom of Galicia and Lodomeria, Cisleithania, Austria-Hungary
- Venerated in: Roman Catholic Church
- Beatified: 19 June 2005, Pilsudski Square, Warsaw, Poland by Cardinal Józef Glemp
- Feast: 29 January
- Attributes: Priest's cassock
- Patronage: Michaelites; Against tuberculosis

Bronisław Markiewicz, SDB (13 July 1842 – 29 January 1912) was a Polish Roman Catholic priest and a professed member of the Salesians of Don Bosco. Markiewicz established the Congregation of Saint Michael the Archangel that devoted itself to the principles and teachings of John Bosco under the patronage of Saint Michael the Archangel.

His beatification was held in Poland on 19 June 2005 after Pope John Paul II acknowledged a miracle credited to him in 2004. Cardinal Józef Glemp presided over it on the behalf of Pope Benedict XVI.

== Life ==
Bronisław Markiewicz was born in Poland in 1842 as the sixth of eleven children to John Markiewicz and Marianna Grysziecka. Although he received religious training at home, but his faith wavered temporarily in his youth, during high school. Of that he wrote: "I wanted to adapt to my teachers' views" and also wrote "Along with faith in God, I lost the peace in my soul and my sense of interior harmony. I was overcome by sadness".

Markiewicz began his studies for the priesthood in 1863 in Przemyśl and was ordained as a priest on 15 September 1867. After his ordination he was appointed as a parish priest at Harta and at the Cathedral of Przemyśl and remained there from 1867 until 1873. He later studied at the Jagiellonian University from 1873 to 1875. In addition, he served as a parish priest at Gac from 1875 until his next appointment in Blazowa in 1877. He taught theological studies at Przemyśl in 1882. Through his parish work, he developed an interest in working with marginalized youth, particularly as a teacher.

Markiewicz decided that he wanted to join the Salesians of Don Bosco and embarked for Turin in November 1885 where he commenced his period of formation with the Salesians. He became attracted to the spirituality of Don Bosco and made his final vows in the order on 25 March 1887 to Bosco himself. Markiewicz contracted aggressive tuberculosis in 1889 and almost died. The disease left him in 1890 at which point he could return to Poland on 23 March 1892 as a parish priest at Miejsce Piastowe. He left Turin with the permission of his Salesian superiors.

He began a trade school in Poland for the poor and for orphaned males. Due to economic conditions, Markiewicz found it difficult to maintain the Italian model, and his Salesian superiors did not agree with his modifications. In September 1897 Markiewicz applied to the Bishop of Przemysl and to the Holy Father Leo XIII, for permission to found a new Congregation. The following December he was removed from the list of members of the Salesian Society and henceforth remained under the jurisdiction of the Bishop of Przemysl.

In 1898, he founded the "Work and Temperance Society" to support these people and base their education on Salesian principles. The corresponding magazine first started to publish - with the same name as the group - on 16 July 1898. Markiewicz also opened an orphanage in Pawlikowice that soon had over 400 people enter as residents. His work received the approval and the blessing of the Bishop of Przemyśl Józef Sebastian Pelczar who encouraged Markiewicz's work.

Markiewicz died from complications from his tuberculosis in 1912.

== Michaelites ==
On 29 September 1921 the Archbishop of Krakow - and future cardinal - Adam Stefan Sapieha approved the order as being one of diocesan right. The male branch and female branches received approbation on 29 September 1921 for the males and on 15 August 1928 for the females. The order later received the full papal approval of Pope Paul VI on 15 June 1966. His congregation now operates in nations such as Papua New Guinea and Belarus.

== Beatification ==
The diocesan process for the beatification of Markiewicz opened in 1958 and closed in 1961 - the opening of the cause in 1958 granted him the posthumous title of Servant of God. The Congregation for the Causes of Saints signed a decree recognizing the process completed its work in 1990 and assumed control of the cause in order for them to investigate the merits of it.

The postulation compiled the Positio in 1990 and submitted it to the C.C.S. for further investigation. The consulting theologians met to discuss the merits of the cause and voted in the affirmative for it on 30 November 1993. The C.C.S. also approved it on 12 April 1994 and would present it to the pope for his approval. It was presented to Pope John Paul II on 2 July 1994 who conferred upon Markiewicz the title of Venerable upon acknowledging his life of heroic virtue.

John Paul II approved a single miracle credited to his intercession on 20 December 2004 in a move that would allow for the beatification to take place. The beatification was celebrated on 19 June 2005 in Warsaw with Cardinal Józef Glemp presiding on the behalf of Pope Benedict XVI.

== See also ==
- Congregation of Saint Michael the Archangel
