= Cathedral of the Protection of the Blessed Virgin Mary in Radom =

Church in Radom, Poland

The Cathedral of Virgin Mary
- Cathedral of the Protection of the Blessed Virgin Mary in Radom
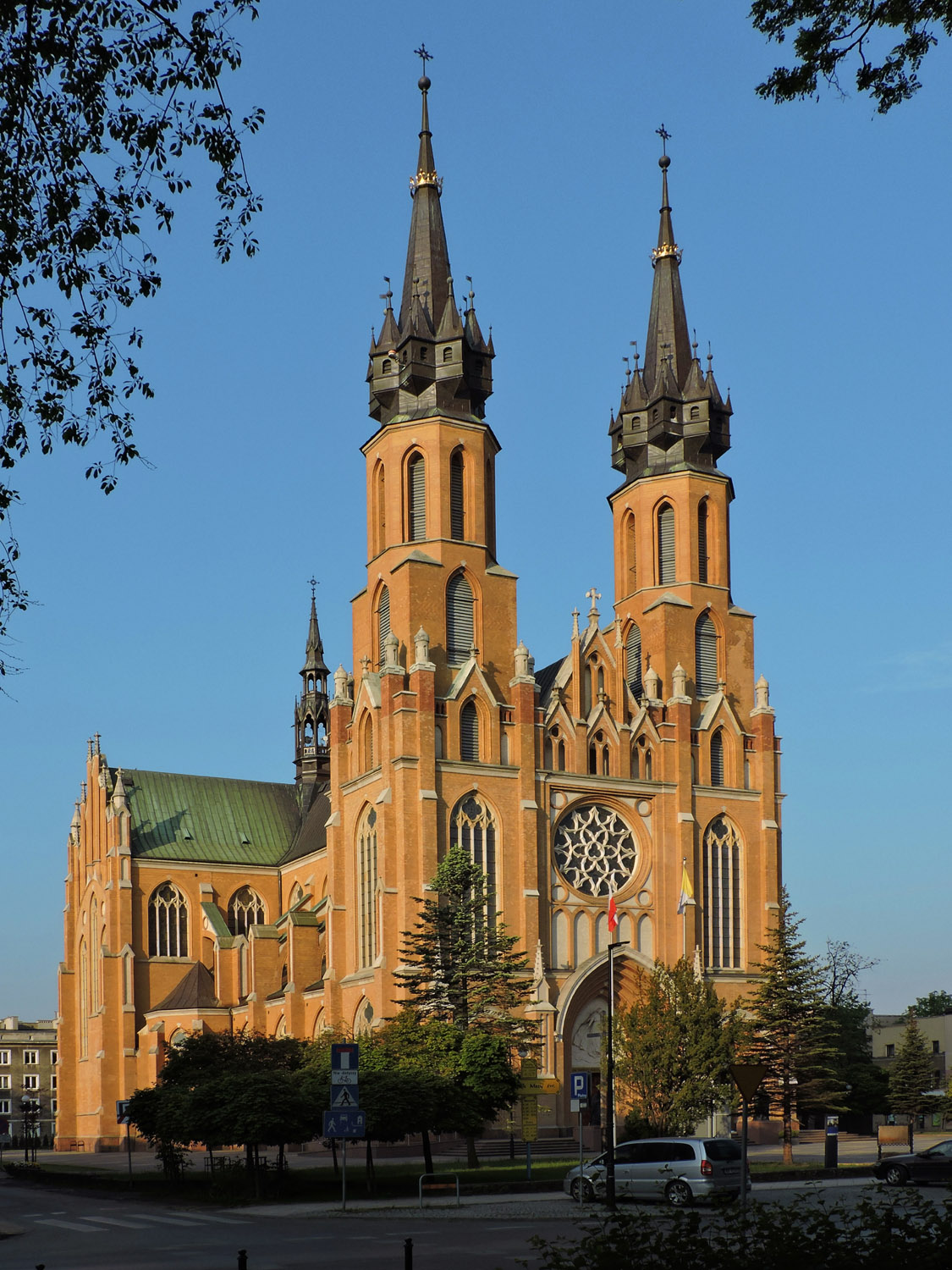
- The Cathedral of Virgin Mary
- 51.3970°N 21.1564°E
- Location: Radom
- Country: Poland
- Denomination: Catholic

Architecture
- Architectural type: Neo-Gothic
- Years built: 1894–1911

The Cathedral of the Protection of the Blessed Virgin Mary in Radom (Polish: Katedra Opieki Najświętszej Maryi Panny w Radomiu) is a Catholic cathedral designed by Józef Pius Dziekoński (1844–1927), located on Henryka Sienkiewicza Street in Radom, Poland.

The Radom Cathedral Museum contains a significant 14th century sculpture of the Madonna with Child. The sculpture was originally a fixture on the Radom city gates.

== Architecture ==
The cathedral was built to model Cathedral of St. Michael the Archangel and Florian the Martyr in Warsaw.

The cathedral features three portals, three naves, and an intricate rosette. The two towers are 72 meters in height.

== History ==
The cathedral was designed by architect Józef Pius Dziekoński. Construction in the initial years was heavily supported by donations from parishioners, including a 20,000 ruble donation from an individual person. As early as the 1880s, local press had published desires for a new cathedral to be "an example for coming generations" in Radom.

In December 1904, a nearby worker protest resulted in multiple casualties. The incident occurred after midnight mass.

In 1984, Bishop Edward Materski gave an anti-communist mass at the cathedral.

In 2012, Archbishop Gerhard Ludwig Müller gave a homily there.
