= Siekluki, Masovian Voivodeship =

Siekluki
- Village
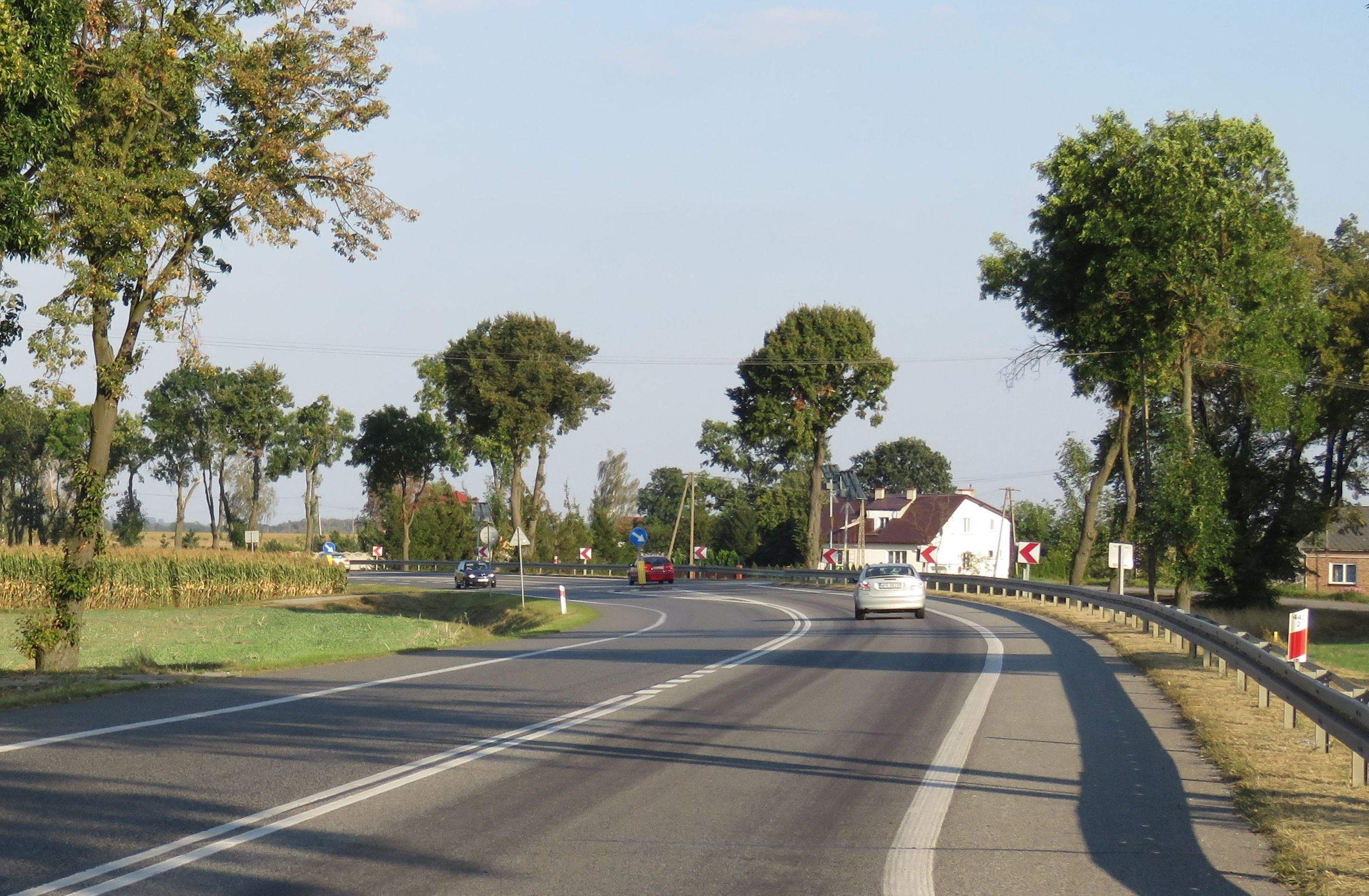

- Location within Poland
- Coordinates: 52°37′N 20°18′E
- Country: Poland
- Voivodeship: Masovian
- County: Płońsk
- Gmina: Dzierzążnia

Siekluki [ɕɛˈkluki] is a village in the administrative district of Gmina Dzierzążnia, within Płońsk County, Masovian Voivodeship, in east-central Poland.
