= Edward Henryk Materski =

Polish Roman Catholic bishop

- Bishop of the Diocese of Radom (emeritus)
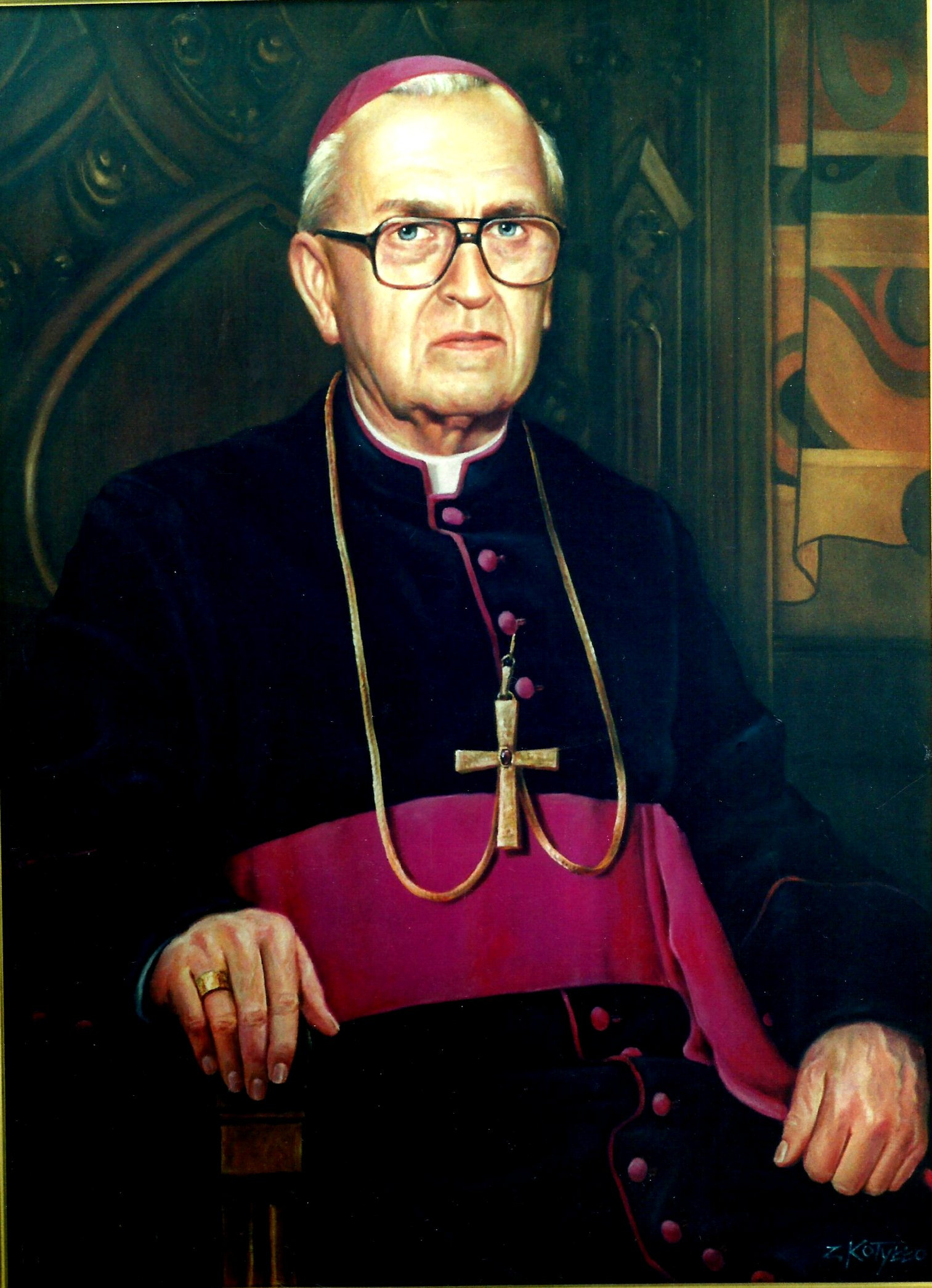
- Church: Roman Catholic Church
- See: Roman Catholic Diocese of Radom
- In office: 1992–1999
- Predecessor: none
- Successor: Jan Chrapek

Orders
- Ordination: 20 May 1947
- Consecration: 22 December 1968 by Stefan Wyszyński

Personal details
- Born: 6 January 1923; Vilnius, Poland
- Died: 24 March 2012 (aged 89); Radom, Poland
- Motto: Veni, Domine Jesu

Edward Henryk Materski (6 January 1923 – 24 March 2012) was a Polish prelate of the Catholic Church who served from 1992 to 1999.

== Biography ==
Edward Henryk Materski was born in Vilnius and ordained a priest on 20 May 1947. Materski was appointed auxiliary bishop of the Diocese of Kielce as well as titular bishop of Aquae Sirenses on 29 October 1968, and ordained bishop on 22 December 1968. Materski was appointed bishop of the Diocese of Sandomierz on 6 March 1991, and would be appointed to the Diocese of Radom on 25 March 1992. Materski retired from the diocese of Radom on 28 June 1999, and died in Radom aged 89.

== See also ==
- Diocese of Radom
- Diocese of Kielce
- Diocese of Sandomierz
