= Henryk Tomasik =

Polish Roman Catholic bishop

His Excellency Henryk Marian Tomasik
- Bishop of Radom
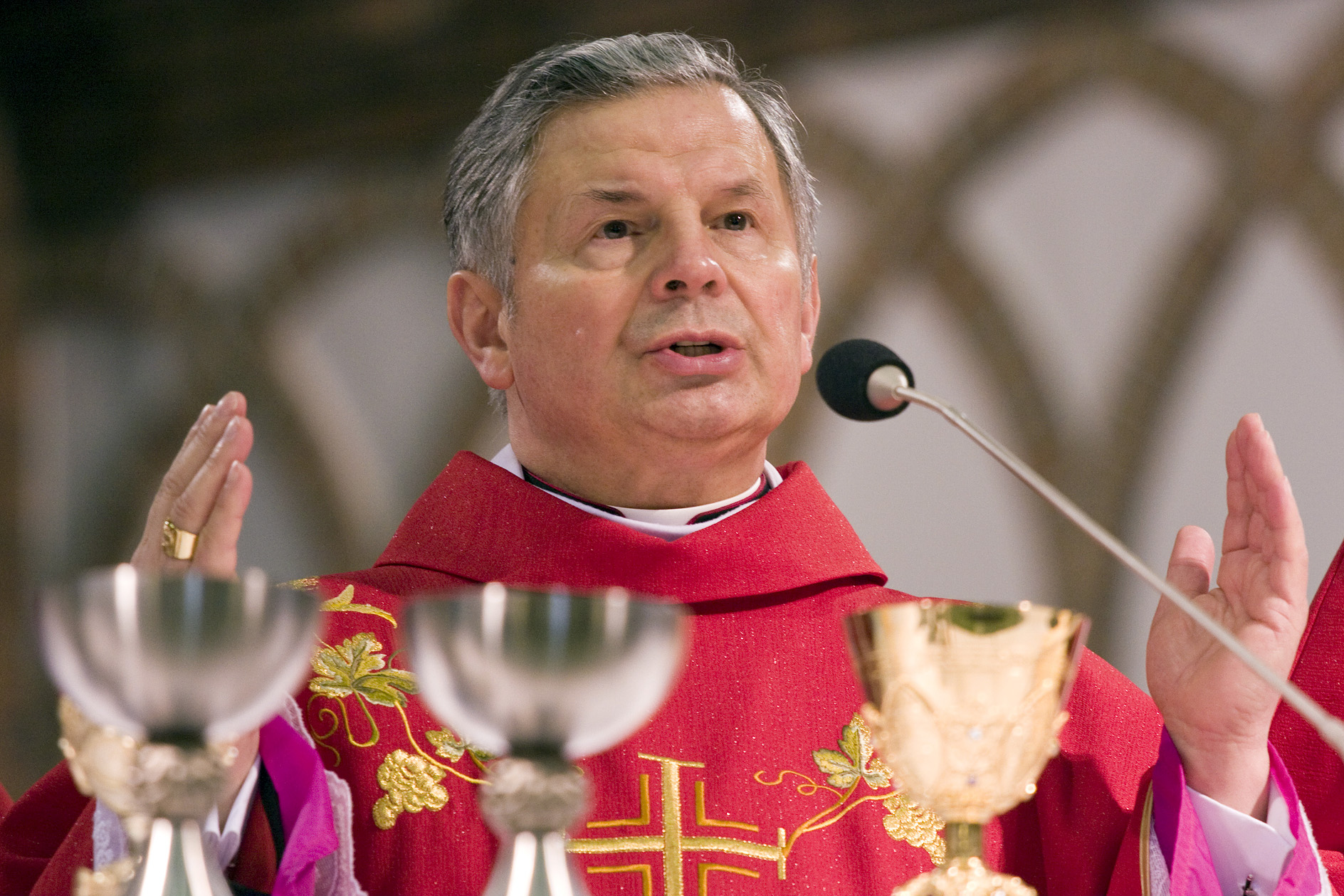
- Henryk Tomasik
- Church: Roman Catholic
- Diocese: Roman Catholic Diocese of Radom
- Appointed: 16 October 2009
- Installed: 14 November 2009
- Term ended: 4 January 2021
- Predecessor: Zygmunt Zimowski
- Previous post: Auxiliary Bishop of Siedlce (1992–2009)

Orders
- Ordination: 31 May 1969 by Jan Mazur
- Consecration: 6 January 1993 by Pope John Paul II

Personal details
- Born: January 4, 1946 (age 80) Łuków, Poland
- Coat of arms

Styles of Henryk Tomasik
- Reference style: The Most Reverend
- Spoken style: Your Excellency
- Religious style: Monsignor
- Posthumous style: not applicable

Henryk Marian Tomasik (born 4 January 1946) was the bishop of Radom in the years 2009-2021. He previously served as Auxiliary Bishop of Siedlce.

Tomasik was born in Łuków in the Diocese of Siedlce. After completing his studies at the Major Seminary in Siedlce, was ordained a priest 31 May 1969. He exercised his ministry as assistant pastor at Radoryż Kościelny from 1969-1971. From 1971-1974 he studied at the Catholic University of Lublin, where he received his doctorate in Philosophy. From 1974 he was professor at the Major Seminary in Siedlce, where he taught ethics, theodicy, philosophy of religion and Catholic social teaching. He was also responsible for exercising for youth academic assistance and, since 1982, responsible for the diocesan campus ministry.

On 21 November 1992 he was appointed Titular Bishop of Minor Fornos and Auxiliary Bishop of Siedlce. On 6 January 1993, he received episcopal consecration from Pope John Paul II in Rome, and was appointed by the President of the Polish Bishops' Conference Commission for youth ministry. Since 1995 he is also executive officer of C.E.P. for World Youth Day. In close collaboration with the Pontifical Council for the Laity and local committees of the host countries, has drawn tens of thousands of young Poles to participate in every world meeting with the Pope and was invited by the Holy See as a catechist to all World Youth Days.

Currently with the Polish Episcopal Conference he holds the following positions: President of the Episcopal Council for the Pastoral Care of Youth and member of the Commission for Catholic Education, and member of the Councils: for Poles abroad for Migration, Tourism and Pilgrimages; for Family

He was appointed bishop of Radom appointment by Pope Benedict XVI on 16 October 2009, following the vacancy created by the appointment of Zygmunt Zimowski as president of the Pontifical Council for the Pastoral Care of Health Care Workers. He was installed at Radom on 14 November 2009. On the 4 January 2021 Pope Francis made the decision to remove him from the office of the Bishop replacing him with Bishop Marek Solarczyk

Catholic Church titles
Preceded by Zygmunt Zimowski	Bishop of Radom; 14 November 2009 – present	Succeeded by incumbent
