= Congregation of Saint Michael the Archangel =

Catholic clerical religious congregation of Pontifical Right for men

- Congregatio Sancti Michaelis Archangeli
- Abbreviation: CSMA
- Nickname: Michaelites
- Formation: 1921; 105 years ago
- Founder: Blessed Fr. Bronisław Bonawentura Markiewicz, SDB
- Type: Clerical Religious Congregation of Pontifical Right for men
- Headquarters: Ul. Marszalka Józefa Pilsudskiego 248/252, 05-261 Marki-Struga, Poland
- Coordinates: 41°54′4.9″N 12°27′38.2″E
- Members: 311 members (includes 270 priests) as of 2020
Countries present
Austria Belarus; Italy; Germany	Argentina Paraguay Australia Canada USA
Papua New Guinea
- Superior General: Fr. Dariusz Wilk, C.S.M.A.
- Patron saint: Michael the Archangel
- Parent organization: Roman Catholic Church
- Website: http://www.michalici.pl/

The Congregation of Saint Michael the Archangel (Latin: Congregatio Sancti Michaëlis Archangeli) abbreviated CSMA, also known as the Michaelites, is a Catholic clerical religious congregation of Pontifical Right for men (brothers and priests) founded by the Blessed Father Bronisław Markiewicz, a Polish priest from Miejsce Piastowe, Poland. The Congregation of Saint Michael the Archangel is one of the 30 officially recognized groups of the Salesian Family of Don Bosco.

== History ==
On September 29, 1921, the Bishop of Kraków Adam Stefan Sapieha issued the Erecting Decree of the Congregation. Two members of the congregation, Blessed Władysław Błądziński and Adalbert Nierychlewski, are among the 108 Martyrs of World War II.

The Congregation was recognized by Pope Paul VI on June 15, 1966.

== The Michaelites today ==
Headquartered in the suburbs of Warsaw, the congregation is a community of brothers and priests that operates in a number of countries around the world including Argentina, Paraguay, Italy, Germany, Belarus, Papua New Guinea, Australia, Austria, Canada and the USA. At the end of 2020, the congregation had 33 communities and 311 members, including 270 priests.

Their apostolic activity concentrates on the education of children and youths. The Congregation runs two orphanages, several oratories and youth centres, five schools and 101 parishes The Congregation also runs a publishing house, "Wydawnictwo Michaelineum". In 2012, the Michaelites expanded into the United States, taking custody of St. Clare of Montefalco Parish in Grosse Pointe Park, Michigan.

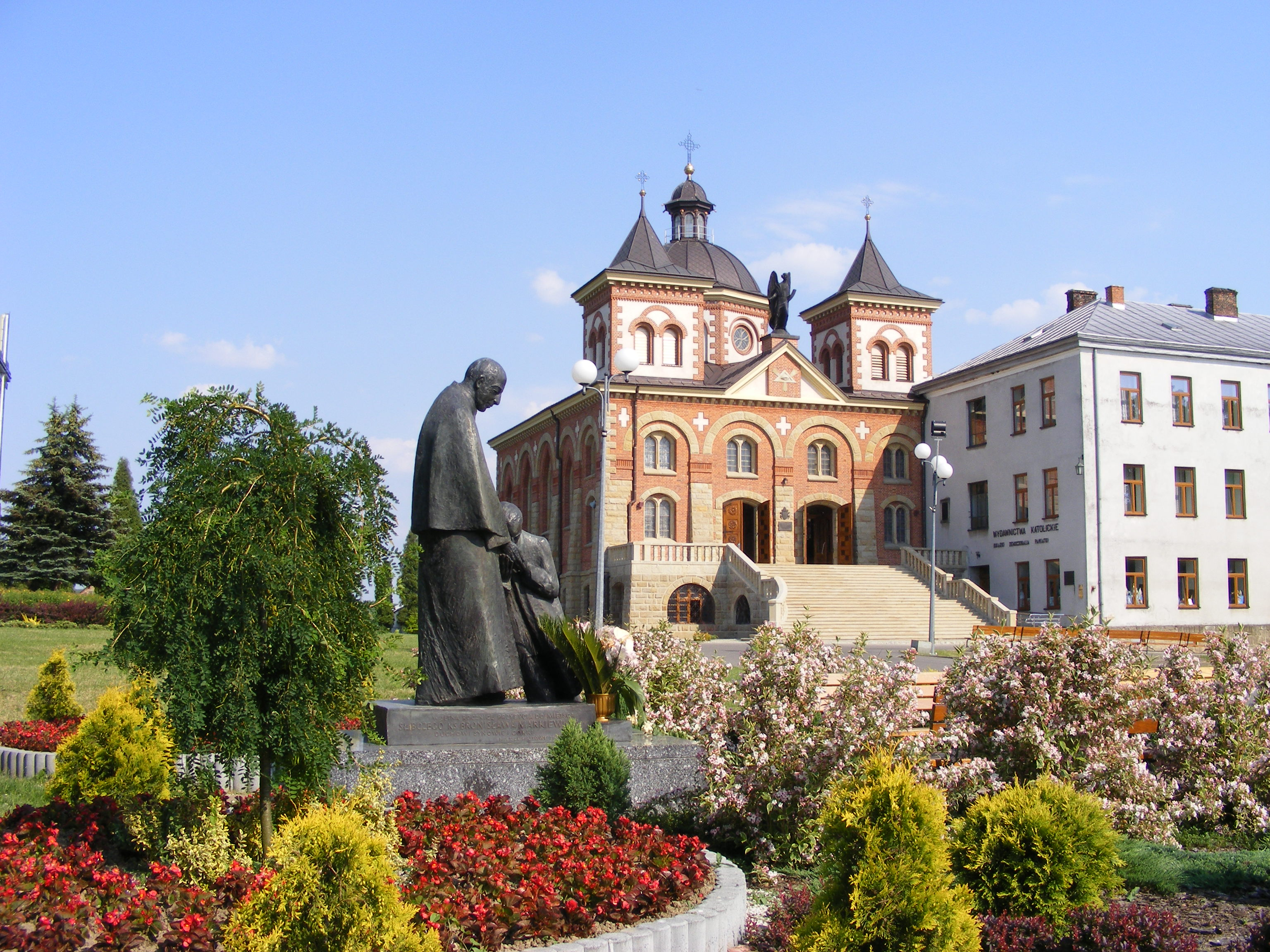
Sanctuary of St. Michael the Archangel in Miejsce Piastowe

In September 2020, Pope Francis congratulated the congregation on it upcoming centennial anniversary, and encouraged its members to continue to spread devotion to St. Michael. In September 2021, the Congregation celebrated its 100-year jubilee with a Mass of Thanksgiving at St. Peter's Cathedral Basilica (London, Ontario).

== Congregation of the Sisters of St. Michael the Archangel ==
Servant of God Anna Kaworek (1872–1936) helped to co-found the Sisters of St. Michael. In 1894, she came to Miejsce Piastowe. In 1897, together with 5 companions, she made private vows of chastity, poverty and obedience. She and the other sisters cared for orphans and helped to publish the magazine Powściągowość i Praca. The Sisters of the Congregation received canonical approval in 1928; they work in 6 European countries and as missionaries in Cameroon.

== See also ==
- Saint Michael (Roman Catholic)
- Church of Mariahilf
