= Wypych =

Wypych is a surname. Notable people with the surname include:

- Andrew Peter Wypych (born 1954), Polish-born American Roman Catholic bishop
- Filip Wypych (born 1991), Polish Olympic swimmer
- Małgorzata Wypych (born 1971), Polish politician
- Paweł Wypych (1968–2010), Polish politician
- Anna Wypych (born 1996), Brazilian actress, producer and makeup artist.
