= Olszowa Street =

Street in Warsaw, Poland

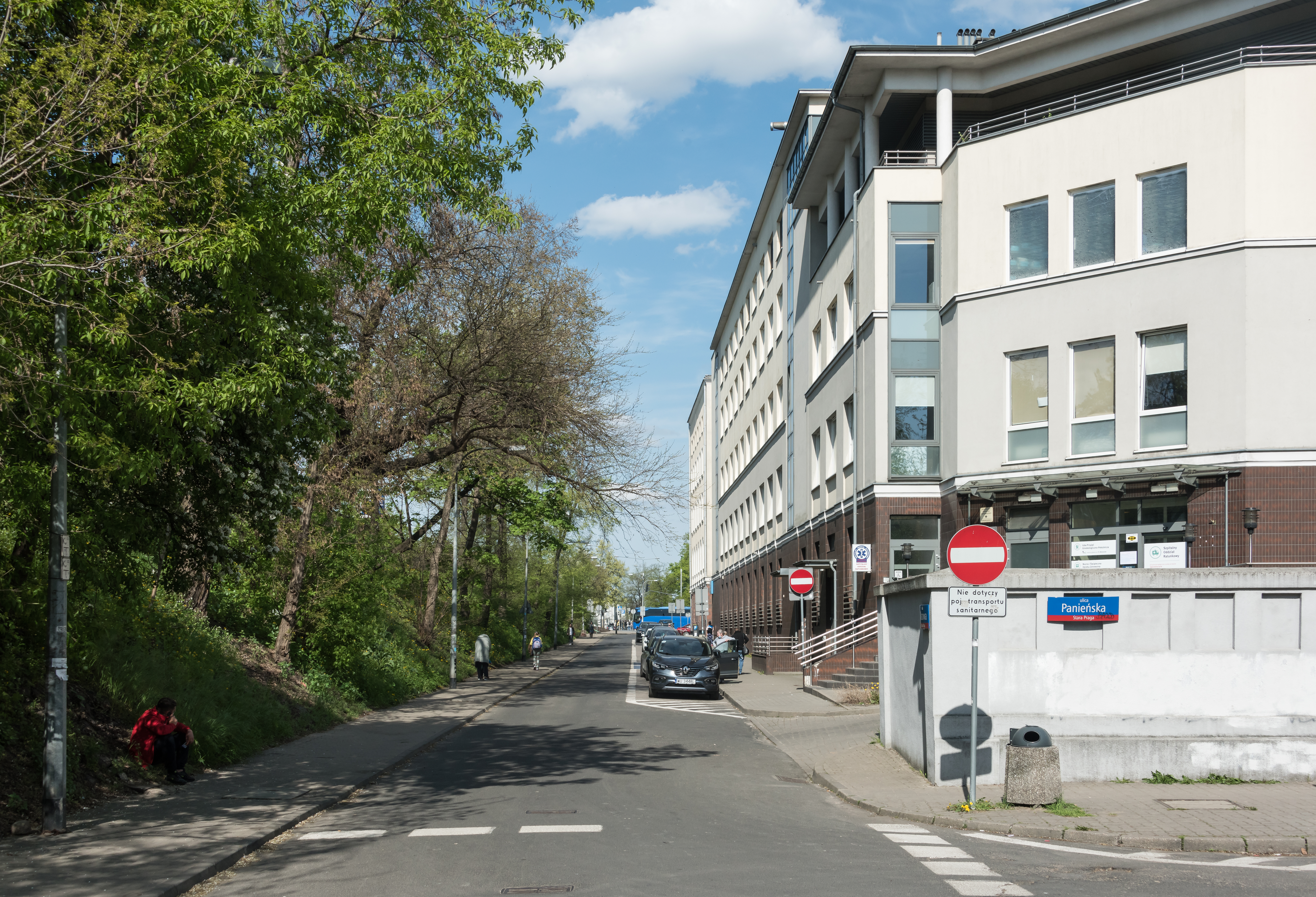
- Olszowa Street, view from the intersection with Panieńska Street toward Weteranów 1863 Square
- Interactive map of Olszowa Street
- Part of: Praga-Północ
- Length: 340 m (1,120 ft)
- Location: Warsaw, Poland
- Coordinates: 52°15′1.7″N 21°1′32.4″E

Olszowa Street is a street in the Praga-Północ district of Warsaw, Poland.

Its origins date back to the late 18th century. For much of its history, it ran parallel to the Vistula river toward a bridge, initially the Poniński Bridge at its southern end, and later the Kierbedź Bridge and Silesian–Dąbrowa Bridge at its northern end. Until the end of the Second Polish Republic, the street was lined with military buildings. The tracks of the Jabłonna Railway ran along the street, with the Warszawa Most railway station located nearby.

After World War II, the street was significantly shortened, and later it absorbed Dębowa Street, becoming largely perpendicular to the river in most of its course.

== Route and development ==
Olszowa Street runs east to west, starting at Józef Sierakowski Street along the edge of Weteranów 1863 Square, intersecting with Panieńska Street, and then, after a right-angle turn south, ending in a dead-end after a few dozen meters.

The northern side of the street is bordered by the embankment leading Solidarity Avenue to the Silesian–Dąbrowa Bridge. On the southern side, from Sierakowski Street to Panieńska Street, stand the buildings of the Praga Hospital, officially addressed to Solidarity Avenue. At the corner with Panieńska Street is the entrance and ambulance access to the hospital's emergency department. Beyond the intersection with Panieńska Street, on the southern side, there is a pavilion at 11 Panieńska Street, followed by a small square. On the short southern section closest to the Vistula, the original 19th-century cobblestone pavement, made of fieldstones, is preserved. This section ends before the house at 12 Olszowa Street. The street's numbering also includes a building from the Panieńska Estate, addressed as 8 Olszowa Street, though it is located significantly south of the street's actual end.

In 2016, construction began on a multi-family residential building at 14 Olszowa Street.

== History ==
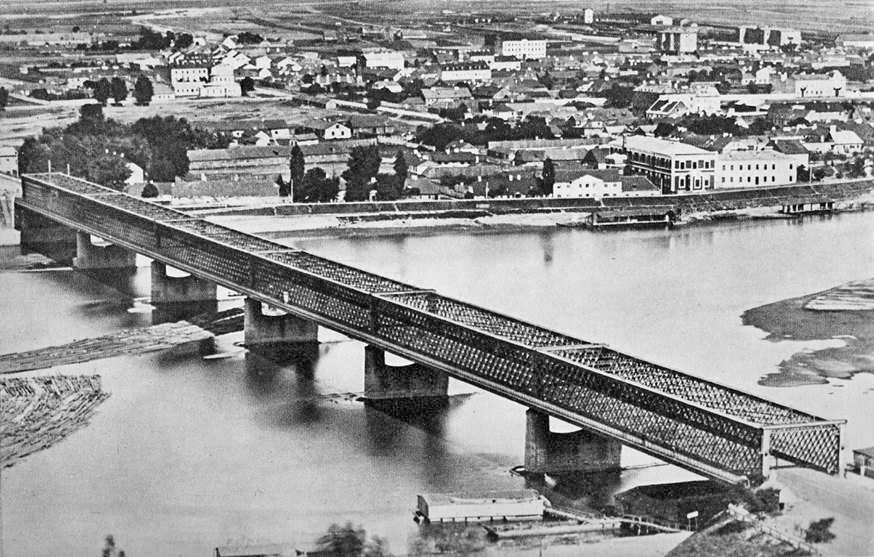
Kierbedź Bridge and Praga seen from the Royal Castle tower, with Olszowa Street running along the riverbank to the right of the bridge

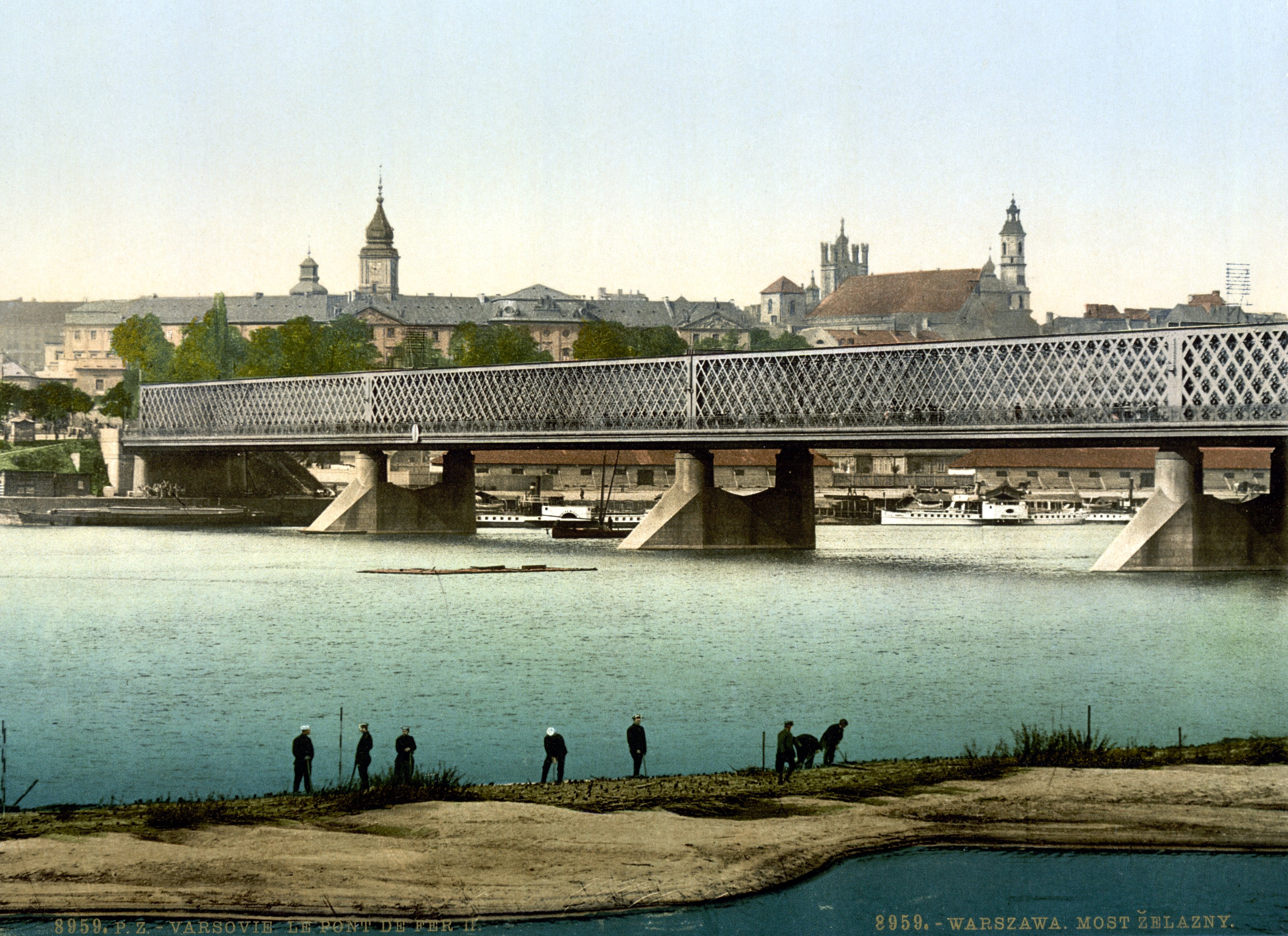
Kierbedź Bridge seen from near Olszowa Street

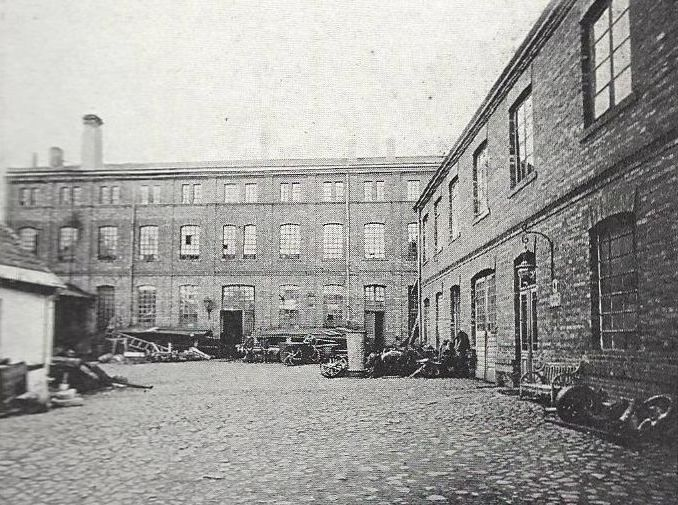
Buildings of C. Skoryna's millstone and machinery factory at 14 Olszowa Street

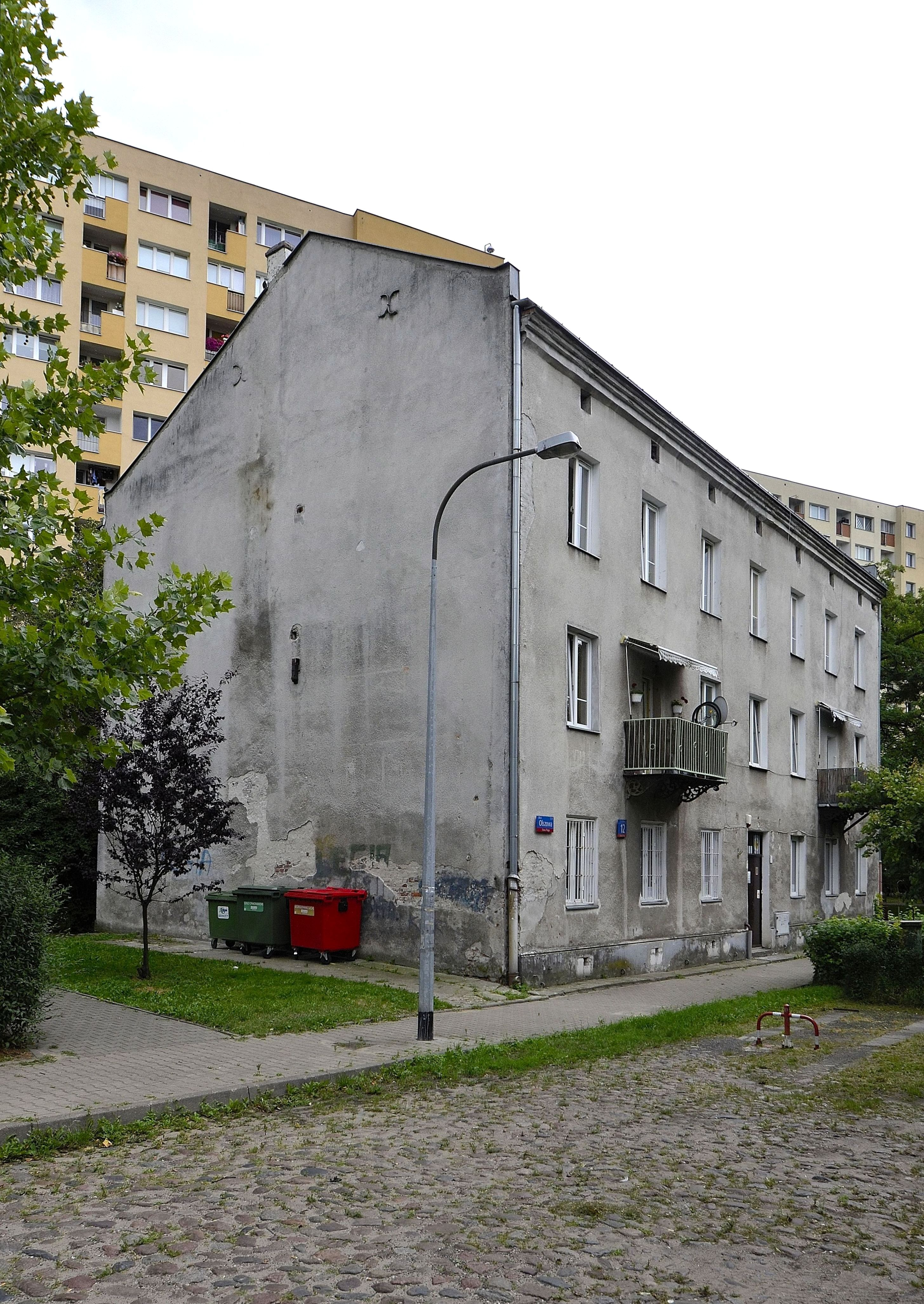
Section of Olszowa Street with original cobblestone pavement and the Wenda family house at 12 Olszowa Street

According to historian Jarosław Zieliński, Olszowa Street was established in 1775 when the Poniński Bridge, a pontoon bridge, was constructed across the Vistula. Its Praga end was located at the outlet of Brukowa Street. A road was then laid along the riverbank south of the bridge, with a dock at its northern end for storing the bridge's components during winter.

The name Olszowa was assigned in 1792 to this riverside road, though it was occasionally referred to as Olchowa. By the late 18th century, it was lined with 13 houses, a manor, and a slaughterhouse. A significant portion of residents were Vistula boatmen, with about 30 living there at the time.

Between 1806 and 1811, during the Duchy of Warsaw, Olszowa Street was incorporated into the fortifications of a bridgehead, but unlike nearby Panieńska Street and others, it was not demolished. During this period, a complex of single-story brick military buildings was constructed, housing pontoon barracks and a lazaretto, and in 1808, the first private single-story brick house was built at 6 Olszowa Street.

After 1815, the fortifications were dismantled, and in 1819, a two-story brick house was built next to the one at 6 Olszowa Street.

Between 1814 and 1826, the Customs House, designed by Antonio Corazzi, was constructed in place of the demolished barracks and lazaretto, with adjacent storage facilities. In 1826, a Jewish prayer house was recorded, maintained by Chaim Hersz Kayler, located at property no. 418 (now 10 or 12 Olszowa Street), consisting of a single room for 31 worshippers. Nearby, at 16 Olszowa Street, a single-story brick bridge storage warehouse was built in 1829.

By the mid-19th century, the former dock had become completely silted and unusable for storing bridge components, leading to the expansion of storage facilities near the Customs House.

Between 1859 and 1864, the Aleksandrowski Bridge, commonly known as the Kierbedź Bridge, was constructed, along with Aleksandrowska Street, whose embankment closed off Olszowa Street from the north. A short street named Dębowa, running at the base of the embankment, connected Olszowa to Panieńska Street.

During this period, a protective embankment was built along Olszowa Street on the river side to prevent flooding.

From 1869 to 1879, several garden theaters operated along Olszowa Street. Private houses were renovated or replaced with new ones. The only surviving building from this era is the two-story brick house of the Wenda family, built in 1876. Its river-facing facade featured two metal balconies, modest window frames on the first floor, and rustication on the ground floor. This house is listed in the municipal register of monuments of the City of Warsaw.

Newspaper advertisements indicate that from at least 1881, a sculptural workshop, C. Skoryna and H. Neuendorff, operated at property no. 415a (later 14 Olszowa Street), offering products made of marble, sandstone, and granite, including tombstones and interior fittings. Tombstones from this workshop, including those for the Lortsch family (1884) and Kociołkiewicz family (1883), are preserved at Powązki Cemetery.

Around 1888, a soap and perfume factory, Flora, owned by Kwieciński, was established at 12 Olszowa Street. Around 1890, the C. Skoryna company, owned by Cezary Skoryna, producing millstones and machinery, relocated to 14 Olszowa Street. The company dated back to 1794. A 1907 newspaper advertisement indicates the company also used the property at 6 Olszowa Street. Around the same time, several Tatar traders from the Russian Empire, members of a Russian artel, lived at 8 Olszowa Street in the Prokulska house. Before World War I, Olszowa Street functioned as a modest Praga boulevard, stretching from the Kierbedź Bridge to a canal connecting the Vistula to Kamionek Lake. Military buildings, including storage facilities, still dominated parts of its development.

In 1900 (construction began in 1899), the narrow-gauge Jabłonna Railway was laid along the undeveloped, odd-numbered side of Olszowa Street, beyond the embankment. Opposite 14 Olszowa Street, the Warszawa Most railway station was established, with its buildings changed multiple times. In 1923, a station designed by architect Konstanty Jakimowicz was completed, but it was replaced again before the war.

After Cezary Skoryna's death in 1903, his millstone and machinery factory passed to his family. In 1914, it was acquired by Emil Rauer, who married Skoryna's daughter Jadwiga in 1910, and P. Kozłowski. The company reportedly ceased operations in 1918. However, Jarosław Zieliński notes that it continued as the Młynotwórnia Machinery Manufacturing Joint-Stock Company, operating as a branch of a Poznań-based company of the same name.

During the interwar period, military buildings of various types – barracks, offices, and residences – continued to line the street. During the siege of Warsaw, in early September 1939, a platoon of the 4th National Gendarmerie, consisting of one officer and about 40 gendarmes, was stationed at 2/4 Olszowa Street under the command of Lieutenant Colonel Stanisław Galos. On 10 September, it merged with another platoon to form the Warsaw-Praga Gendarmerie Platoon, led by Lieutenant Markiewicz, and relocated to 3 Inżynierska Street.

Between 1944 and 1945, nearly all of the street's buildings, including military warehouses and many wooden structures, were destroyed. The factory buildings at 14 Olszowa Street were demolished in 1944 and not rebuilt. Mapa zniszczeń Warszawy w latach 1939–1945 (Map of Warsaw's Destruction 1939–1945) from the National Library of Poland indicates that the entire street's development was burned. A 1984 reprint of this map specifies that the northern side was systematically burned, while the southern side was blown up or bombed.

Between 1952 and 1956, the railway tracks were dismantled. Between 1958 and 1959, Wybrzeże Szczecińskie Street was created, initially running parallel to Olszowa Street. Between 1964 and 1967, houses of the Panieńska Estate were built along Olszowa Street, designed by Teresa Tyszyńska and Gabriel Rekwirowicz. Shortly after the estate's completion, in 1970, the narrow-gauge railway station building was demolished.

A city plan from late 1972 shows Olszowa Street with its original course, while a 1974 map indicates its dead-end at the house at 12 Olszowa Street. On 21 February 1980, the former Dębowa Street, adjacent to the Praga Hospital wall, was incorporated into Olszowa Street and extended to Józef Sierakowski Street. As a result, Dębowa Street ceased to exist in this location, and the name was reassigned to a street in the Białołęka district's Choszczówka estate. This change made Olszowa Street, originally parallel to the Vistula, mostly perpendicular to the river.

During the 2016 construction of a multi-family residential building at 14 Olszowa Street, the developer excavated and removed remnants of the war-destroyed factory buildings. Controversy arose over whether these included historically valuable elements. The issue was reported in the media, noting that the municipal conservator of monuments referred the matter to the prosecutor's office.

Olszowa Street on historical maps of Praga
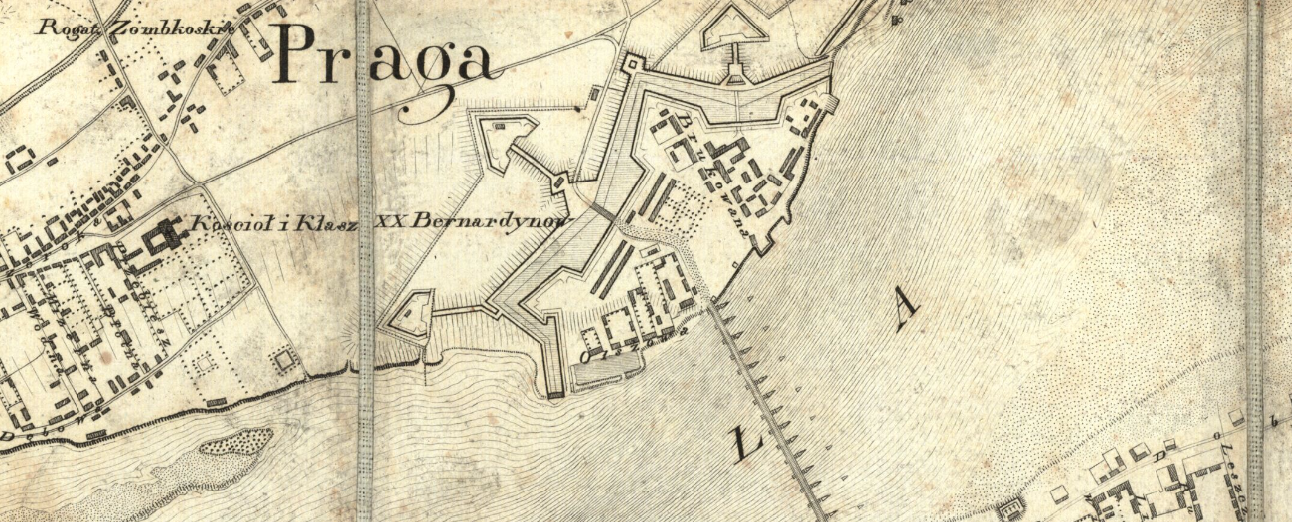
City plan from 1809. Olszowa Street within Napoleonic fortifications

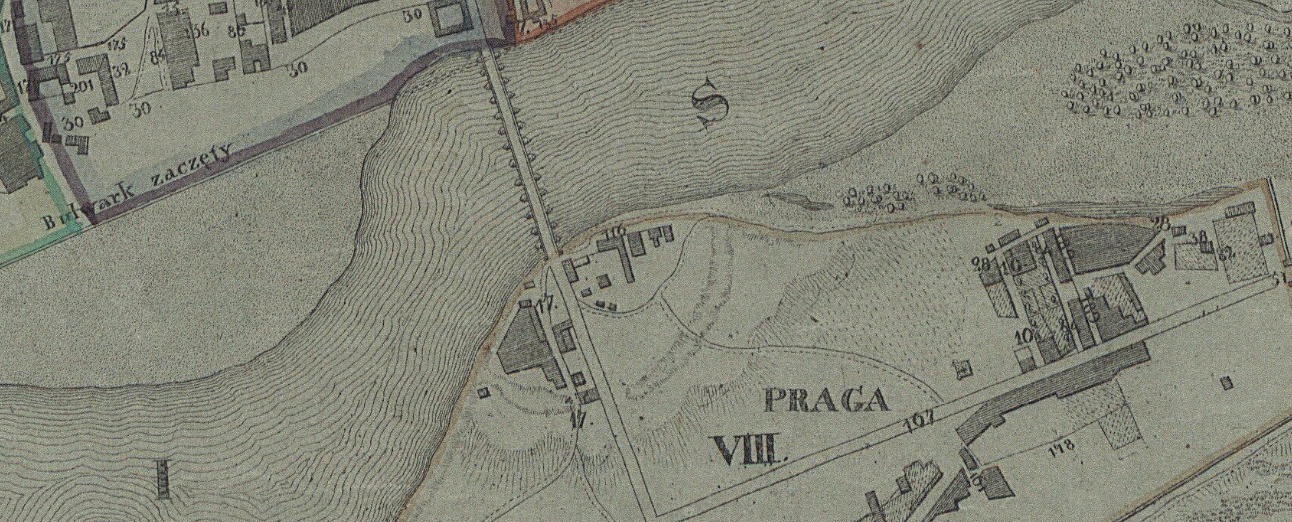
City plan from 1827. Olszowa Street listed as no. 116 in the legend. Remnants of fortifications visible

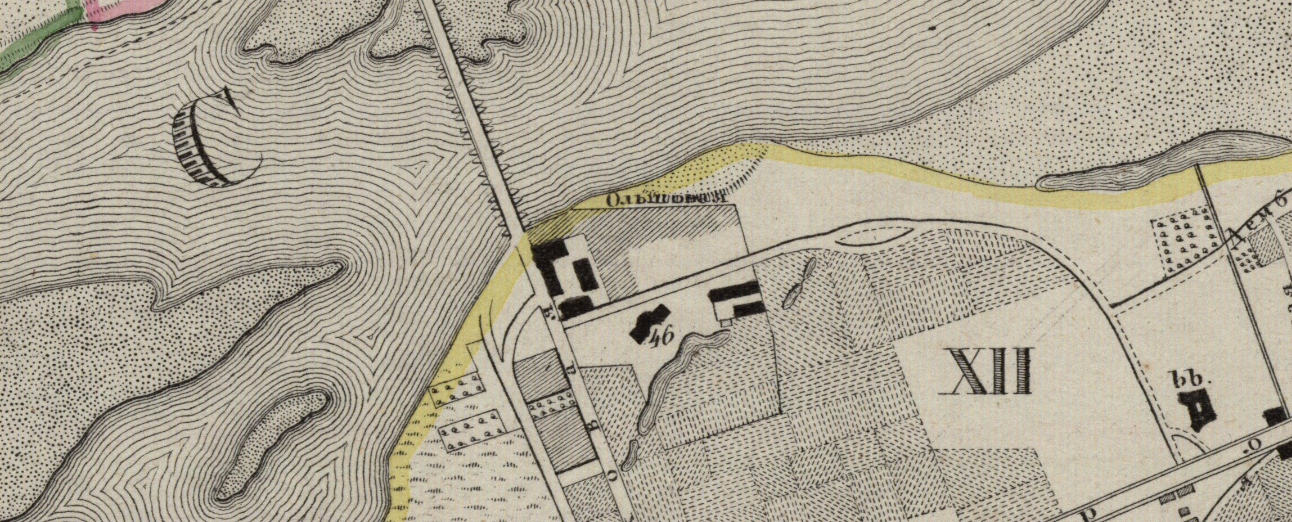
City plan from 1850, before the construction of the Kierbedź Bridge

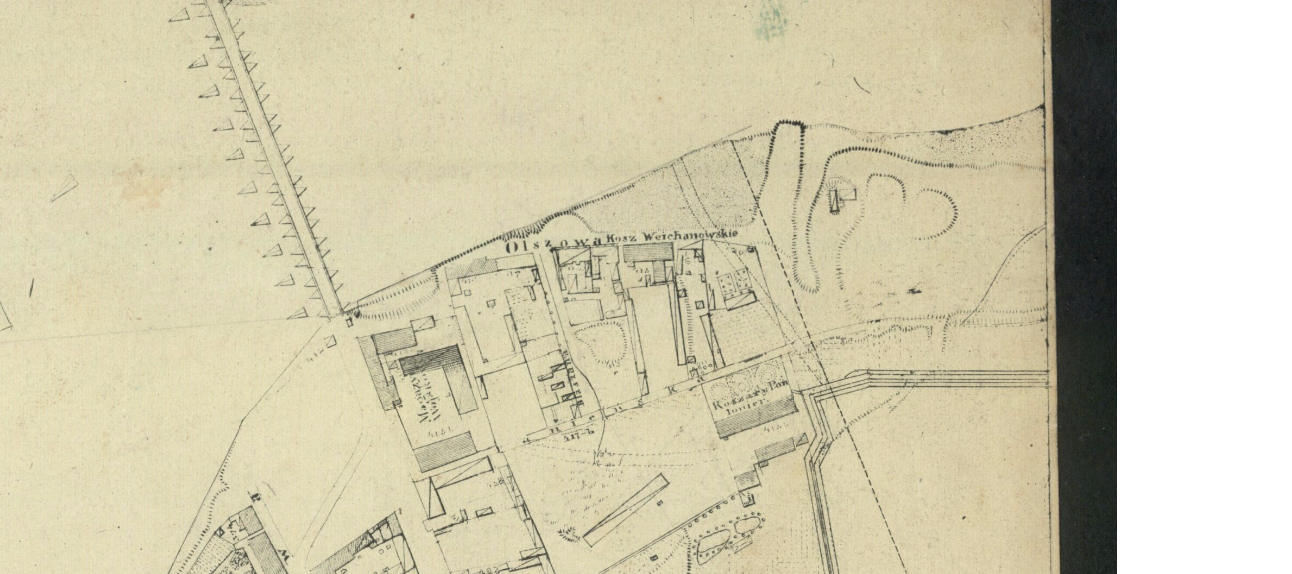
City plan from 1859, a few years before the construction of the Kierbedź Bridge. Military buildings identified in map descriptions

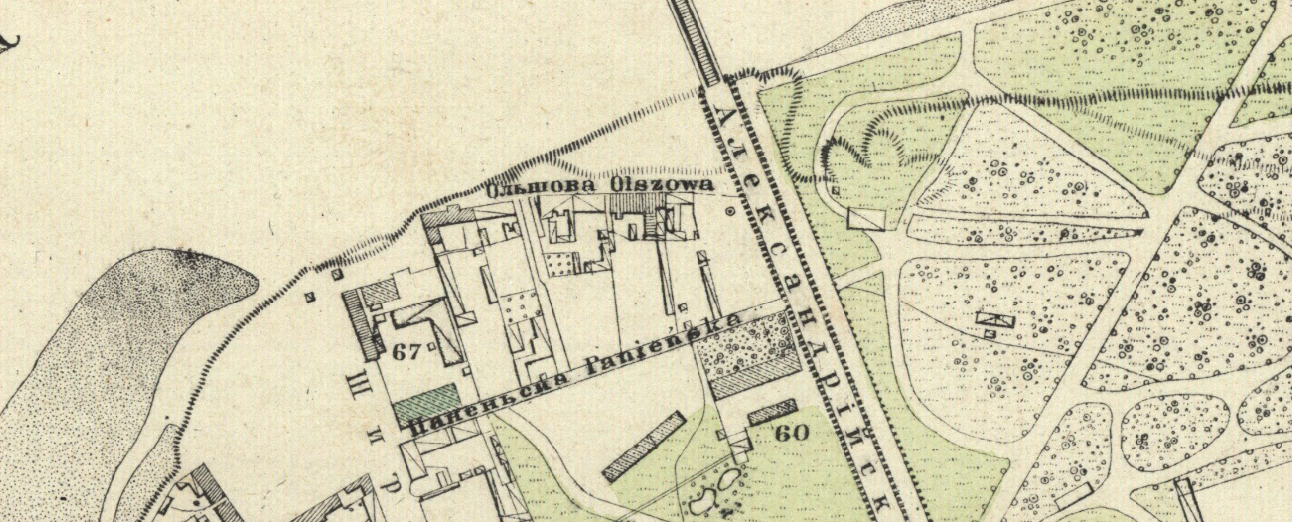
City plan from 1867, three years after the construction of the Kierbedź Bridge

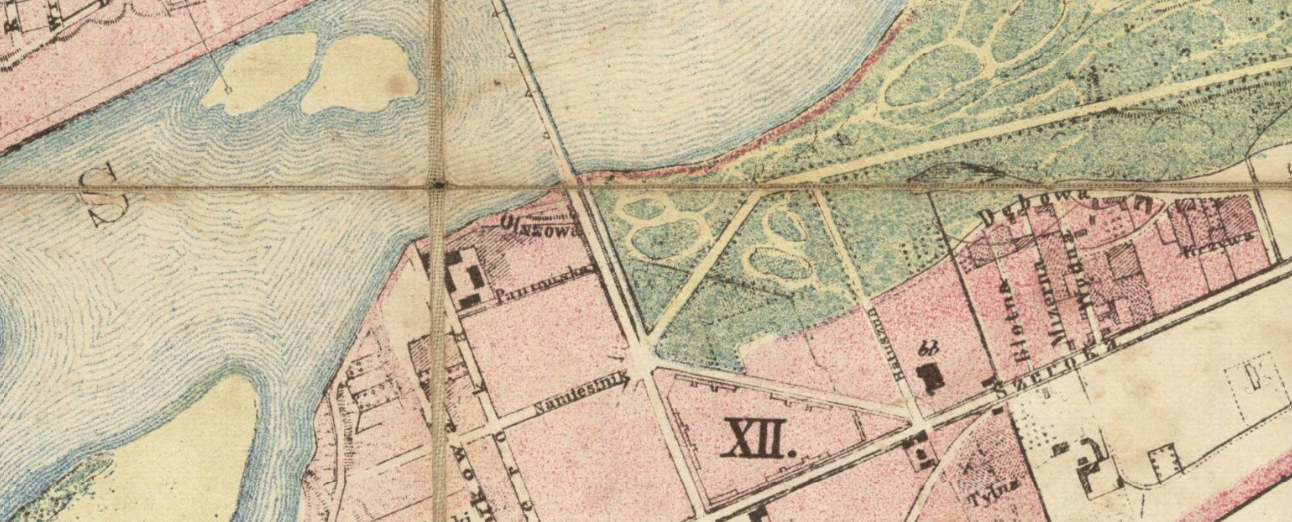
City plan from 1873, nine years after the construction of the Kierbedź Bridge

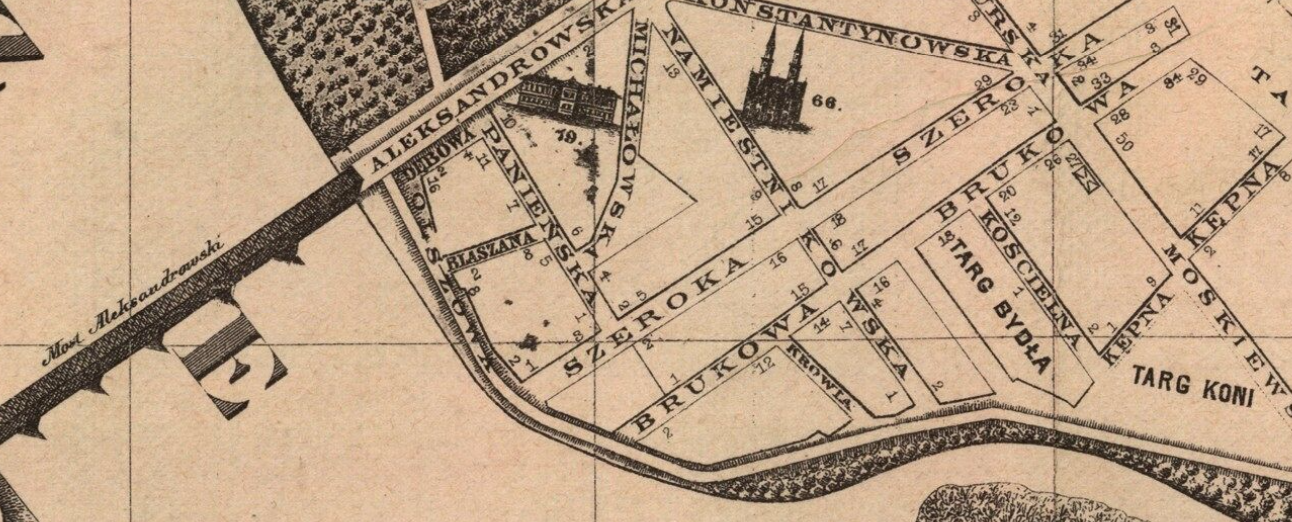
City plan from 1896, a few years before the construction of the narrow-gauge railway. Property numbers visible

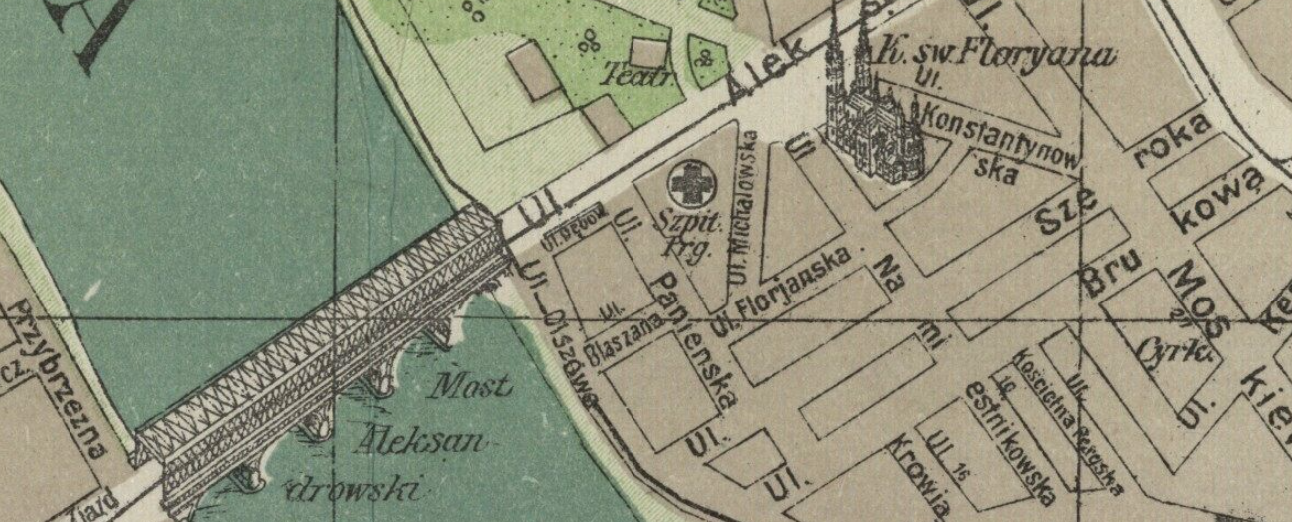
City plan from 1915, end of Russian rule, several years after the construction of the narrow-gauge railway

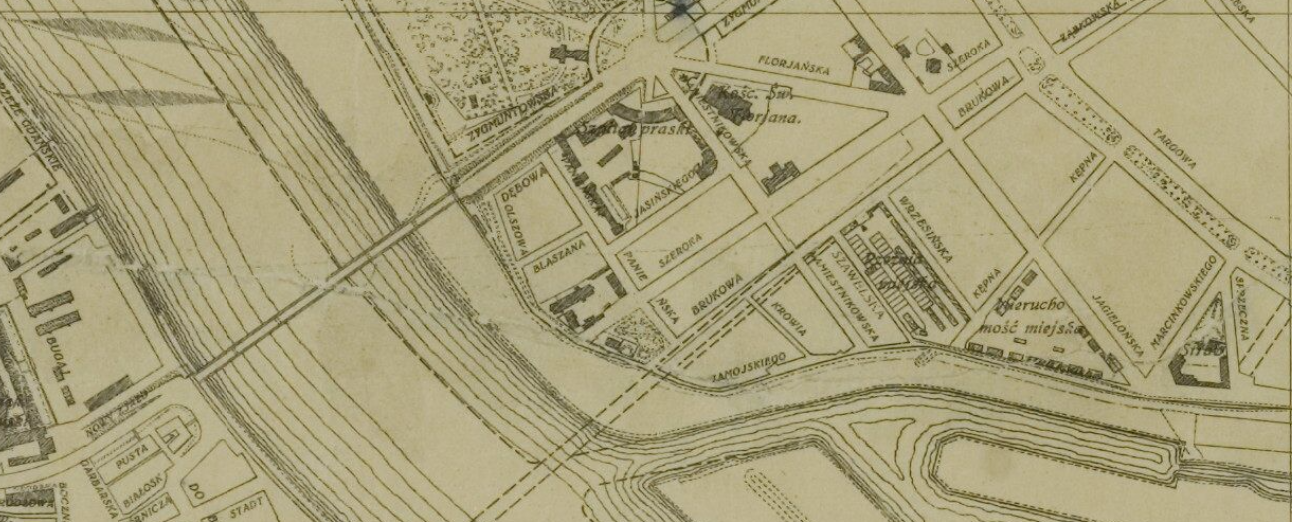
City plan from 1931, during the Second Polish Republic

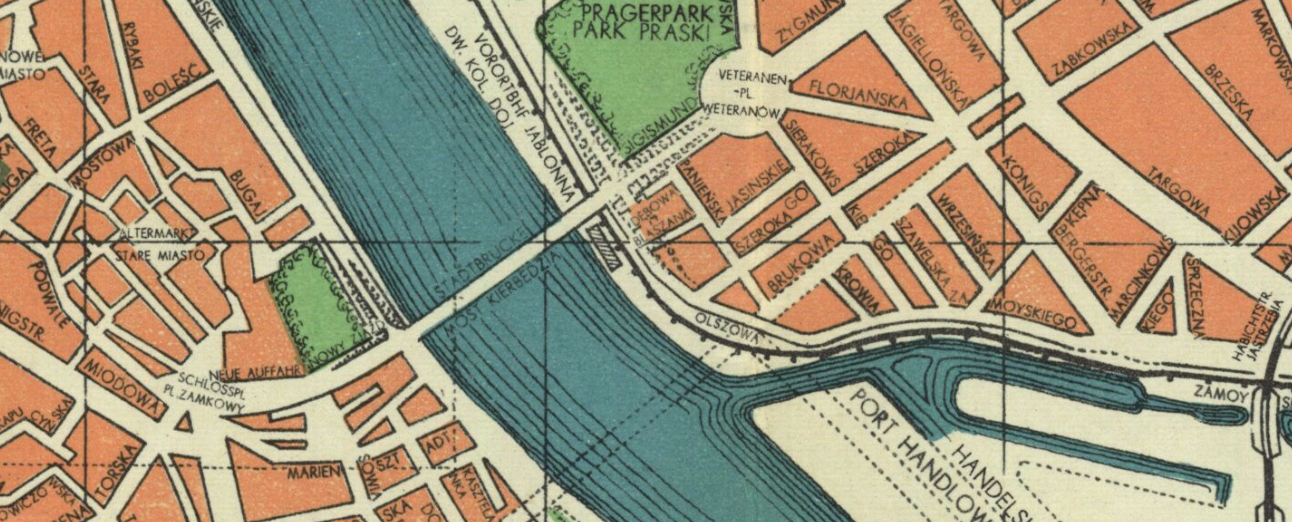
City plan from 1941, during German occupation

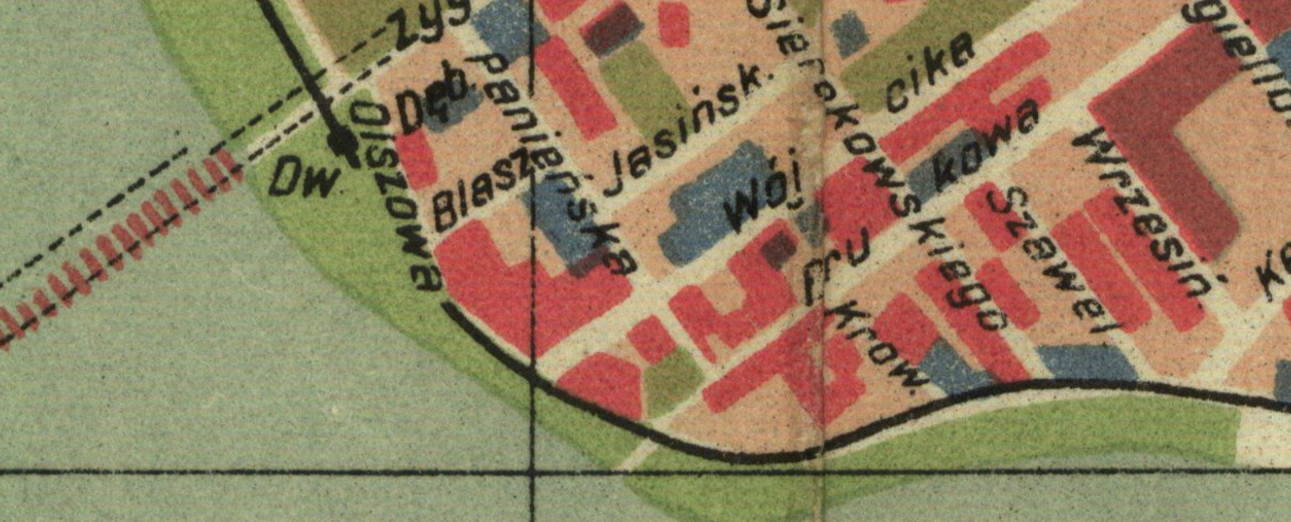
Map of Warsaw’s wartime destruction, 1949

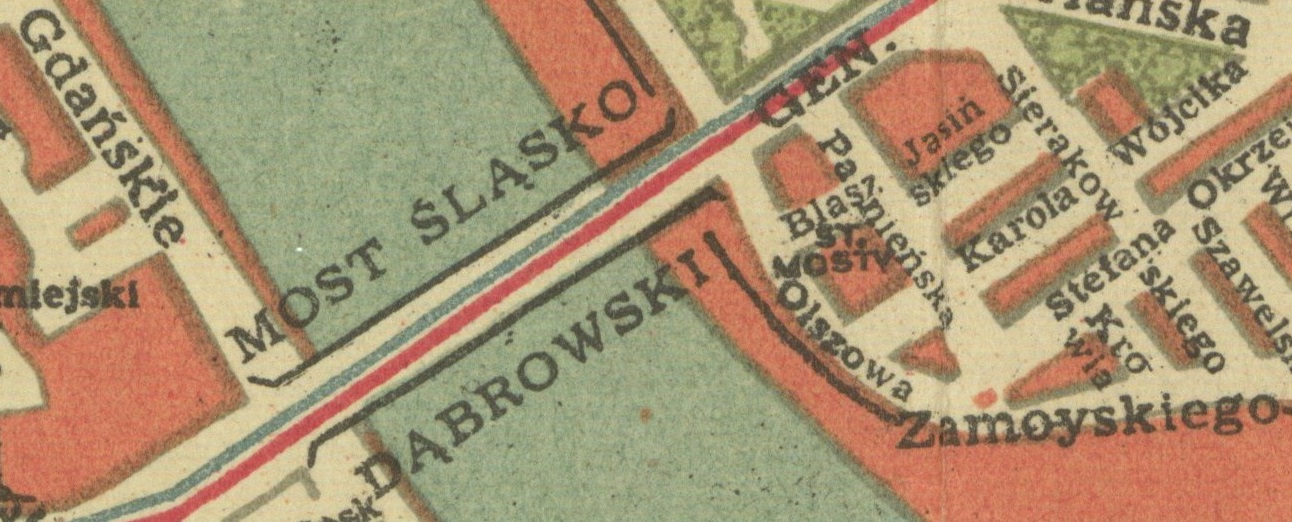
City plan from 1950, after the construction of the Silesian-Dąbrowa Bridge

== Notable people ==
- At 12 Olszowa Street, in the Wend family house, Tadeusz Wenda (1863–1948), a transport engineer and later the builder of the Port of Gdynia, grew up.
- From 1890, the millstone and machinery factory at 14 Olszowa Street, C. Skoryna, was owned by Cezary Skoryna (1840–1903), an industrialist and philanthropist, and later his heirs.
- The factory was later owned by industrialist and independence activist Emil Rauer, who married Skoryna's daughter Jadwiga in 1910, and his partner P. Kozłowski (from 1914 until its acquisition in 1918 by the Młynotwórnia Machinery Manufacturing Joint-Stock Company based in Poznań).
