= Pechorsk =

Pechorsk may refer to:

- Troitsko-Pechorsk, an urban-type settlement in the Komi Republic, Russia
- Pechorsk, common misspelling of Pechersk
