= Pechersk =

Pechersk may refer to:

- Pechersk, Kyiv, a neighborhood in Kyiv, Ukraine
- Pecherskyi District, an urban district of Kyiv, Ukraine
- Kyiv Pechersk Lavra, a historic monastery in Kyiv, Ukraine
- Pechersk, Russia, several rural localities in Russia
