= Pechersk, Russia =

Pechersk (Russian: Печерск), also spelled Pechyorsk (Печёрск), is the name of three rural localities in Smolensk Oblast, Russia:

- Pechersk, Khislavichsky District, Smolensk Oblast, a village in Khislavichsky District, 54°09′11″N 32°15′40″E
- Pechersk (selo), Smolensky District, Smolensk Oblast, a selo in Smolensky District, 54°51′11″N 32°01′55″E
- Pechersk (village), Smolensky District, Smolensk Oblast, a village in Smolensky District
