= Bródno Cemetery =

Cemetery in Targówek District, Warsaw, Poland

Coordinates: 52°16′44″N 21°02′10″E

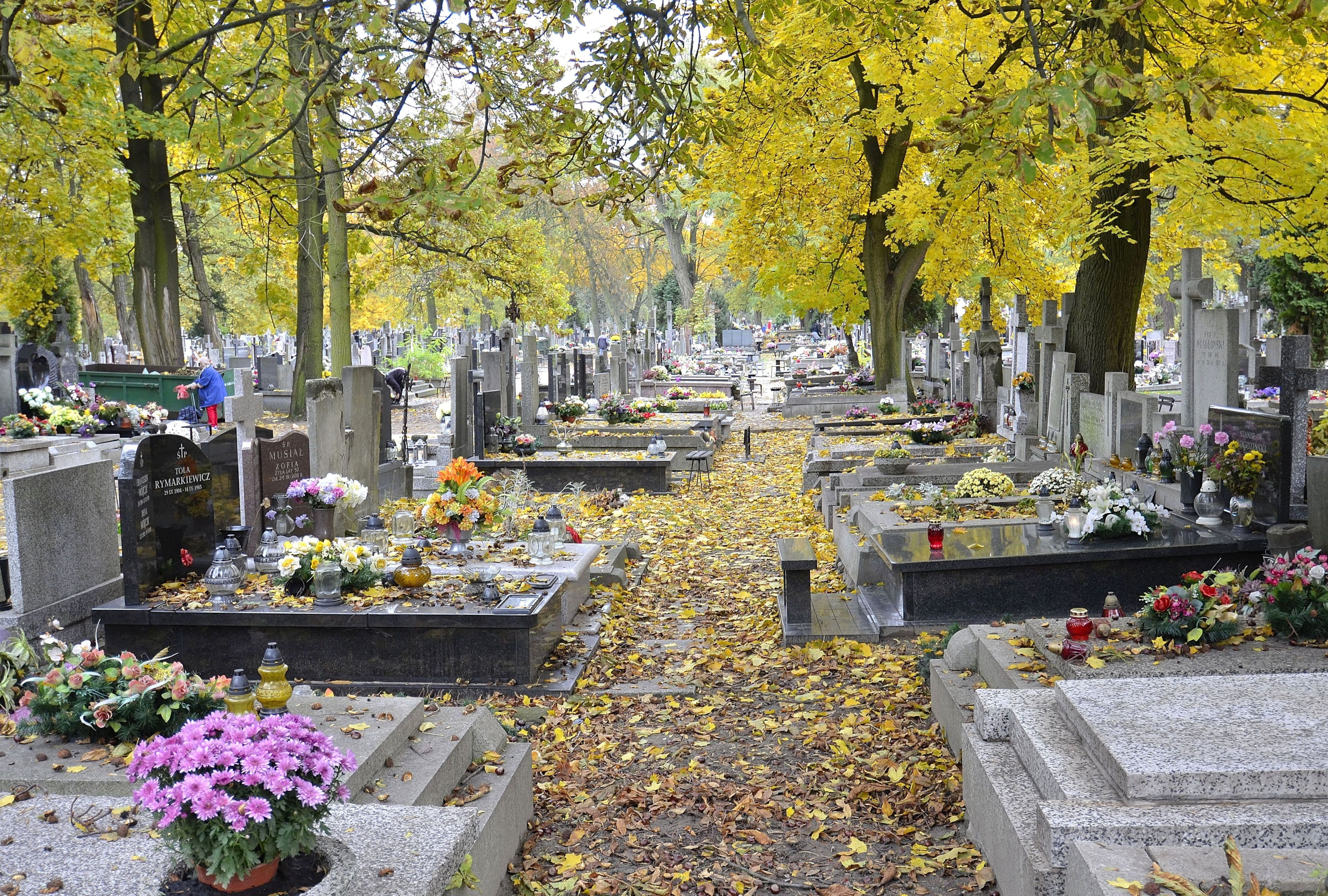
- View in autumn
- Interactive map of Bródno Cemetery

Details
- Established: 11 November 1884
- Location: Warsaw
- Country: Poland
- Type: Public
- Size: 114 hectares (280 acres)
- No. of interments: 1.2 million
- Website: Official website

Bródno cemetery (Polish: Cmentarz Bródnowski, pronounced [ˈtsmɛntaʐ brudˈnɔfskʲi]) is an old cemetery in the Targówek district, in the eastern part of Warsaw, Poland. Occupying an area of 114 hectares (280 acres), it is the largest cemetery in Warsaw. With more than 1.2 million burials, it is one of the largest cemeteries in Europe.

== History ==
At the end of the 19th century Warsaw's population was growing rapidly, and the available cemeteries were unable to cope with the demand. As a result, President of Warsaw Sokrates Starynkiewicz ordered land to be bought at Bródno in 1883. On 20 November 1884 the cemetery was consecrated by Archbishop of Warsaw, Wincenty Teofil Popiel. The cemetery was opened also to the citizens of the left-bank Warsaw in January 1885. The cemetery has been completely opened on 14 June 1887. The Bródno Cemetery served as a burial place mostly for the poor strata of Warsaw society. This was in contrast with the Old Powązki Cemetery, which had a reputation of cemetery for rich.

The cemetery has been expanded on several occasions, most recently in 1934, when it was enlarged to its present extent of 114 hectares. In the interwar period, the cemetery ceased to be the burial place only for poor, as people from higher social strata began to bury their relatives. The northeastern part of the cemetery was designated for people of other religions and without religion. During World War II the cemetery was used as an arsenal by various Polish resistance organizations, and as a hiding place by those on the run from the Gestapo.

== Church ==
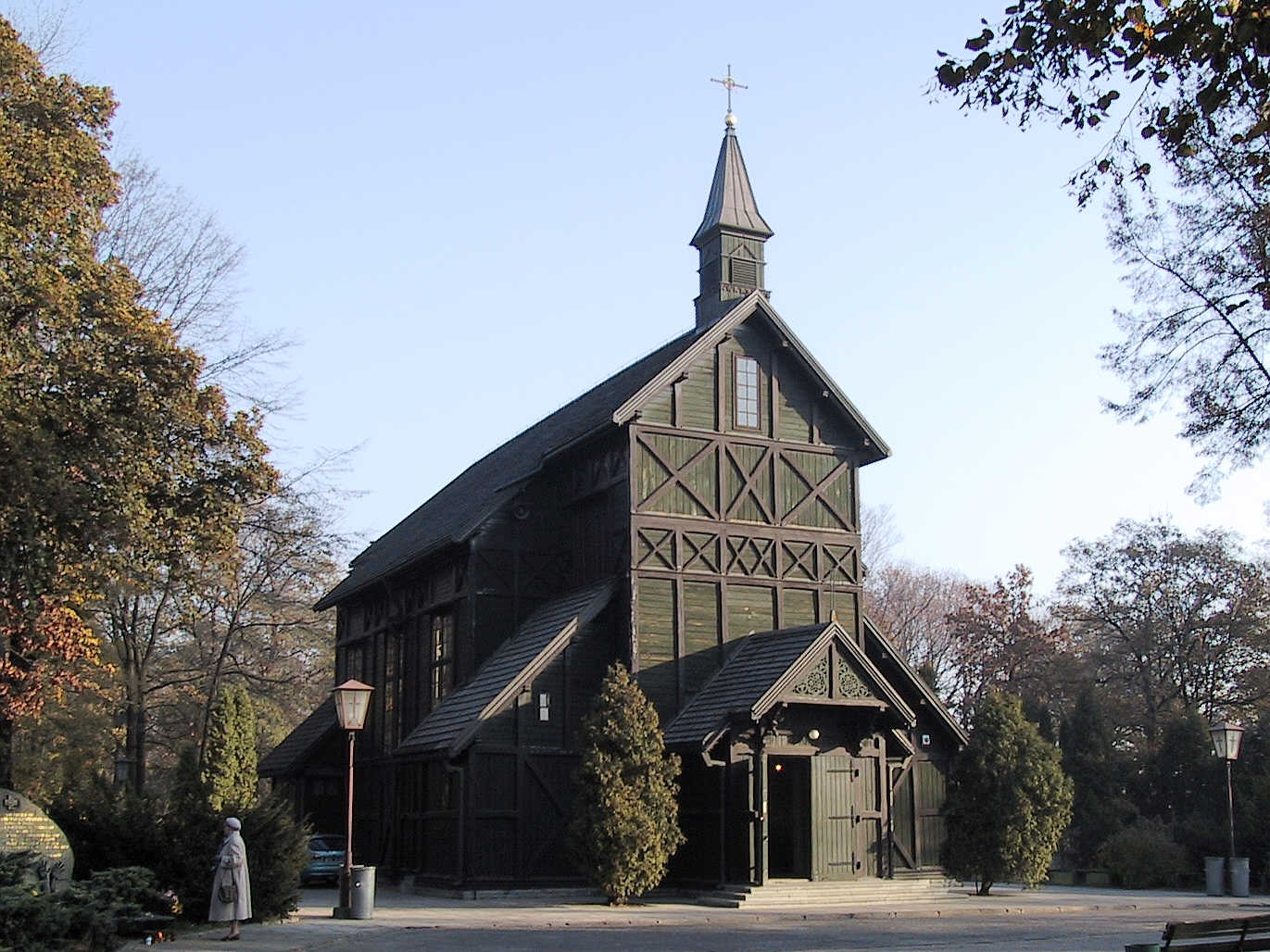
Wooden church of Saint Vincent de Paul

As early as in 1887, city authorities planned to build a chapel at the cemetery. Soon, a small wooden church was constructed, and consecrated on 28 October 1888 as the Saint Vincent de Paul Church, bearing the name of the patron of poor. The church, designed by architect Edward Cichocki, was built from pine wood, and is a simple one-nave building. The wood used for the construction was previously used as a scaffolding at the restoration of the Zygmunt's Column. Until 1952, the small church was merely a cemetery chapel. In 1952, however a new parish was established at Bródno, meaning a larger church was needed. In the late 1950s, the new church, designed by Stanisław Marzyński, was being constructed at the cemetery. The new church building bearing the name of Our Lady of Częstochowa was consecrated on 24 August 1960 by bishop Wacław Majewski. The new building was gradually expanded in the early 1980s and was again ceremonially consecrated by Primate of Poland Józef Glemp on 22 September 1984.

== Burials ==
Notable people buried at Bródno Cemetery include politician and statesman Roman Dmowski, archbishop Aleksander Kakowski, singer Mieczysław Fogg, footballer Edmund Zientara, boxer Antoni Kolczyński, bishop Stanisław Kędziora, writer Seweryna Szmaglewska, politician Paweł Wypych, and industrialist Cezary Skoryna.

== Gallery ==
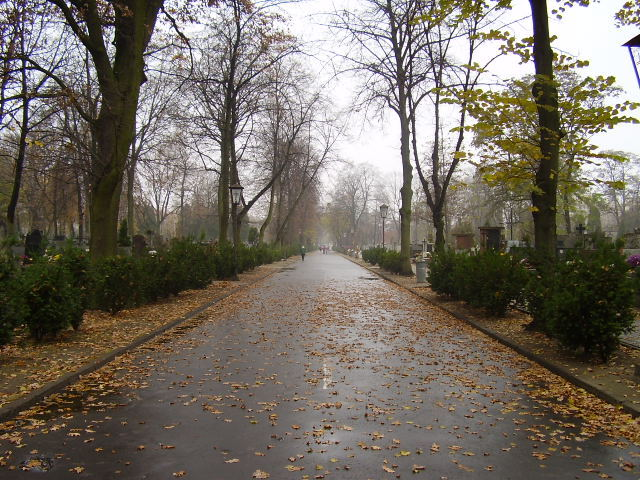
Main lane

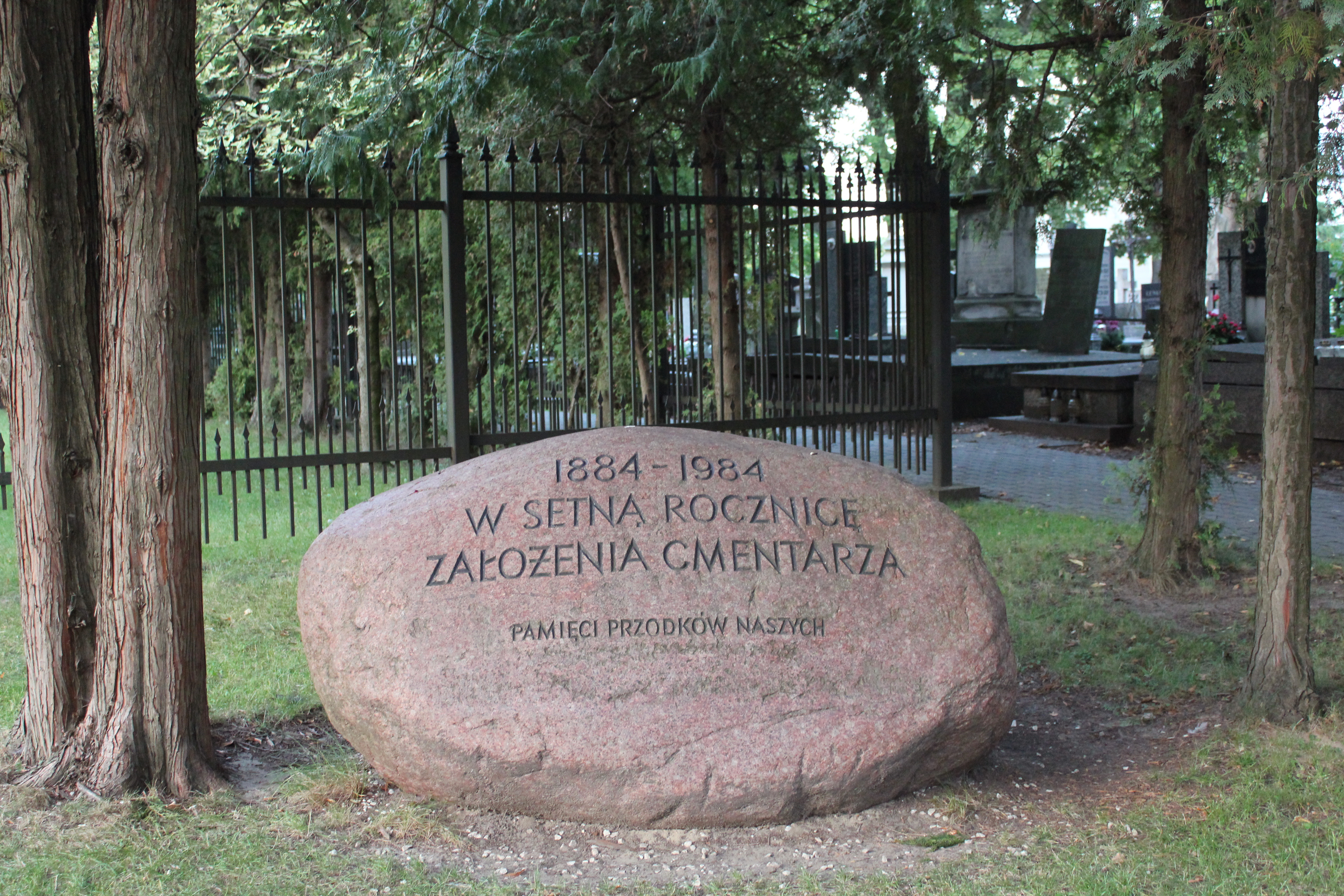
The monument commemorating the 100th anniversary of the cemetery

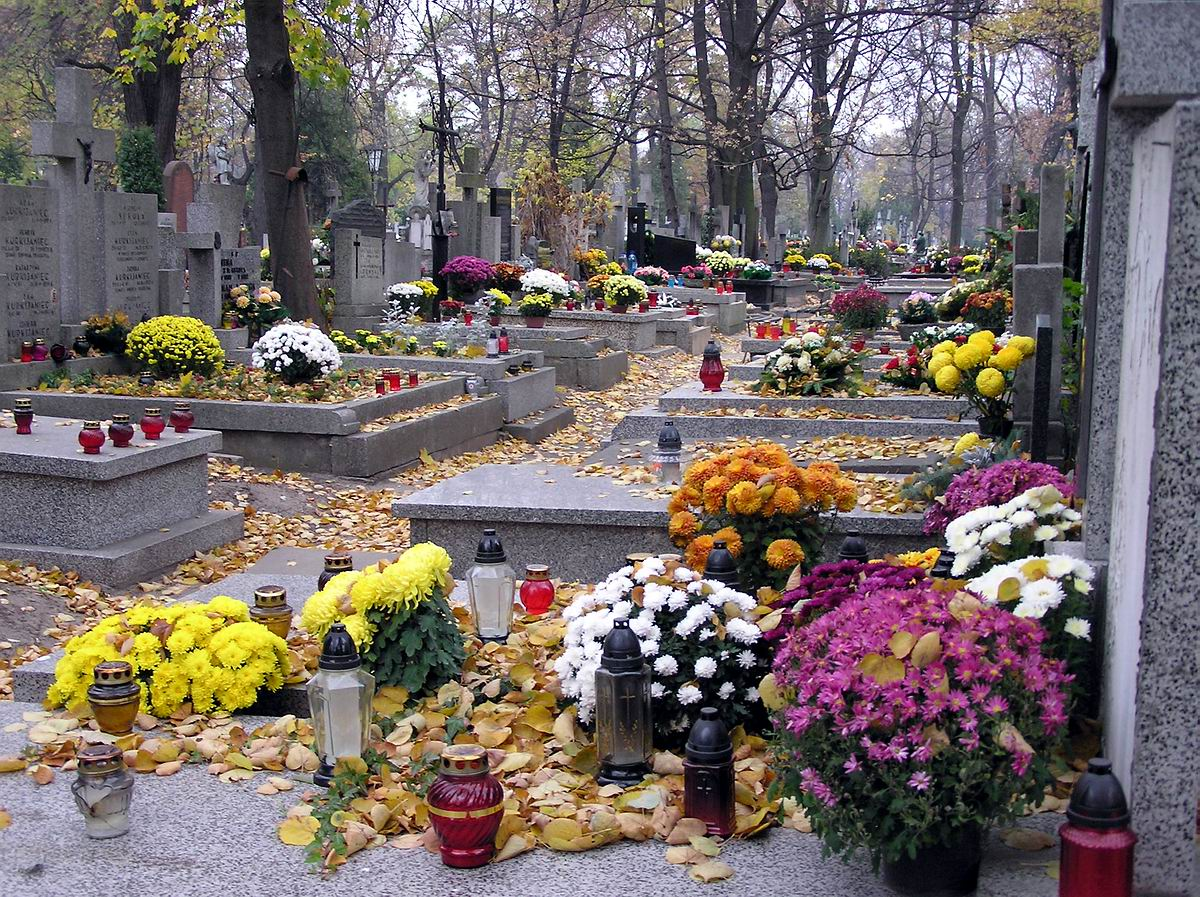
The cemetery during the All Saints' Day

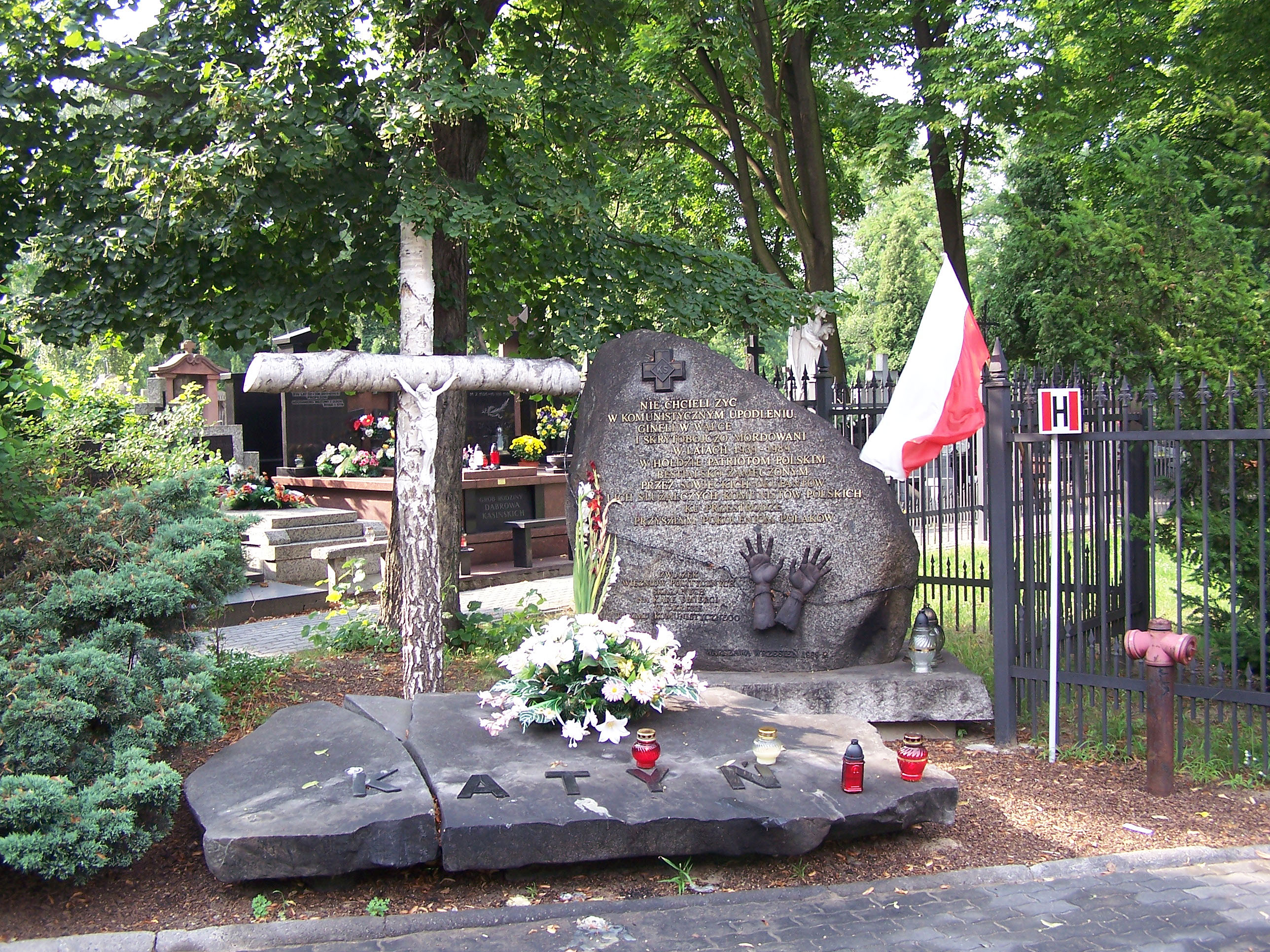
Katyń massacre memorial

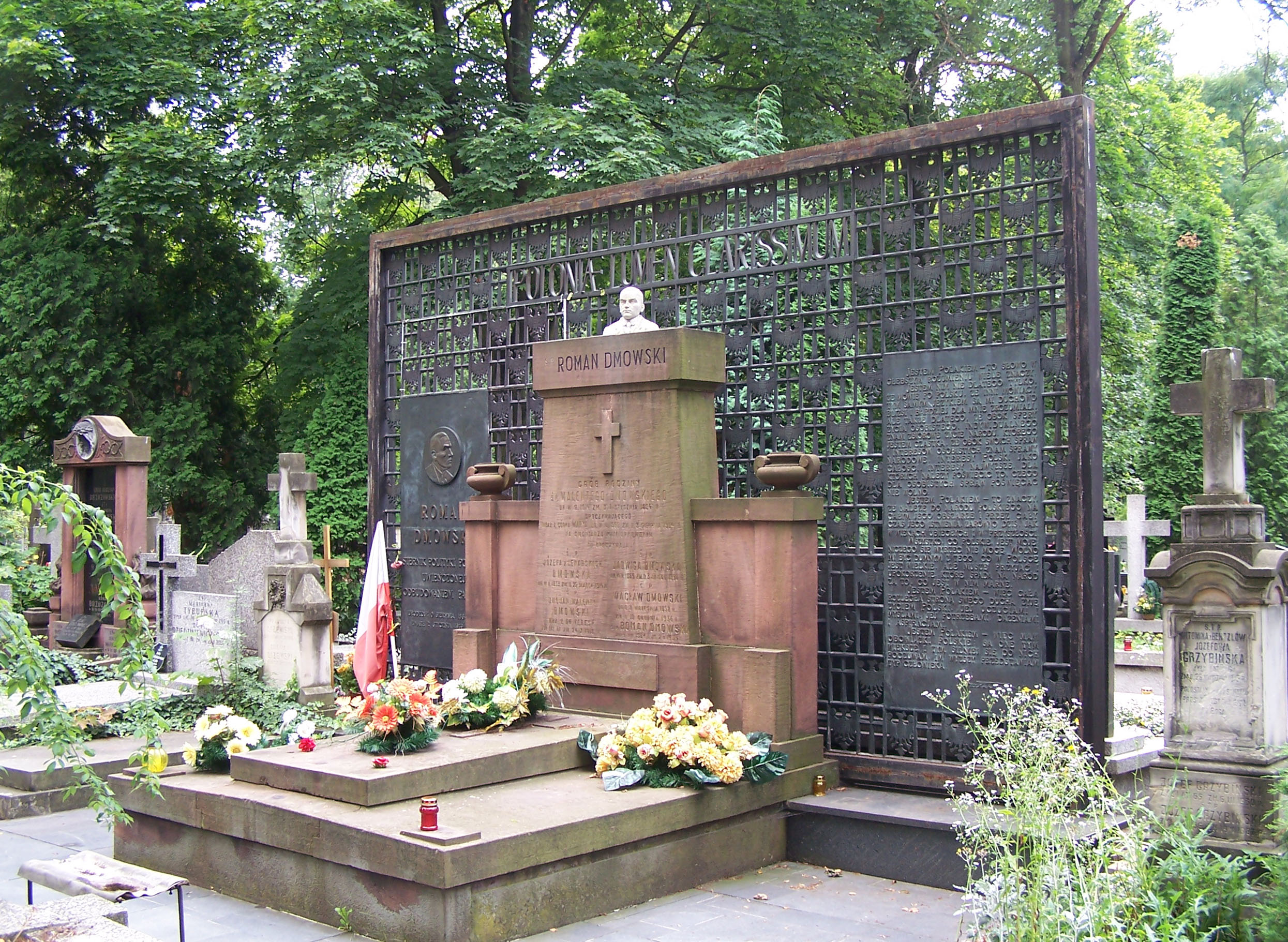
Grave of Roman Dmowski
