= Cezary Skoryna =

Polish industrialist

- Born: August 28, 1840; Warsaw, Congress Poland
- Died: April 19, 1903 (aged 62); Nałęczów, Russian Empire
- Resting place: Bródno Cemetery
- Occupation: industrialist

Signature
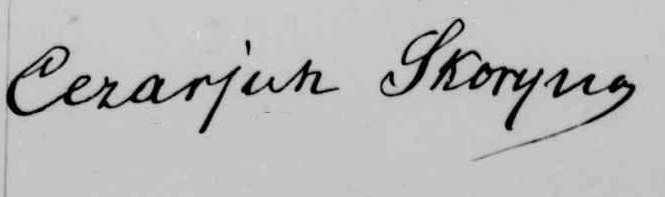

Cezary Franciszek Feliks Skoryna (Sielawa coat of arms, born 28 August 1840 in Warsaw, died 19 April 1903 in Nałęczów) was a Polish industrialist active in the milling machinery industry, social activist, and philanthropist.

After completing his education, he took over the family millstone manufacturing business in Warsaw's Praga district. He expanded it into an internationally recognized enterprise producing and selling a full range of machinery and materials for milling, including the construction of turnkey mills. For a time, he was also a co-owner of a stone-cutting company.

He was a member of the charitable Literary Archconfraternity and the Society for the Encouragement of Fine Arts in Warsaw. He cared for the cholera cemetery in Warsaw and contributed to the establishment of the Bródno Cemetery. Skoryna was deeply involved in social initiatives, participating in various municipal committees and pursuing philanthropic efforts as a private individual.

== Biography ==
=== Education ===
Cezary Skoryna was born on 28 August 1840 in Warsaw. He came from a noble family bearing the Sielawa coat of arms. His parents were Krystian Walenty Skoryna (1805–1851), a millstone manufacturer in Warsaw's Praga district, and Klara Reymond (or Rajmund, 1819–1877), who managed a tavern and inn on the factory premises after her husband's death.

He attended a gymnasium in Warsaw and, after graduating, enrolled in the Cadet Corps in Brest-Litovsk. However, he soon abandoned a military career and pursued commercial studies in Germany.

=== Industrial activities ===
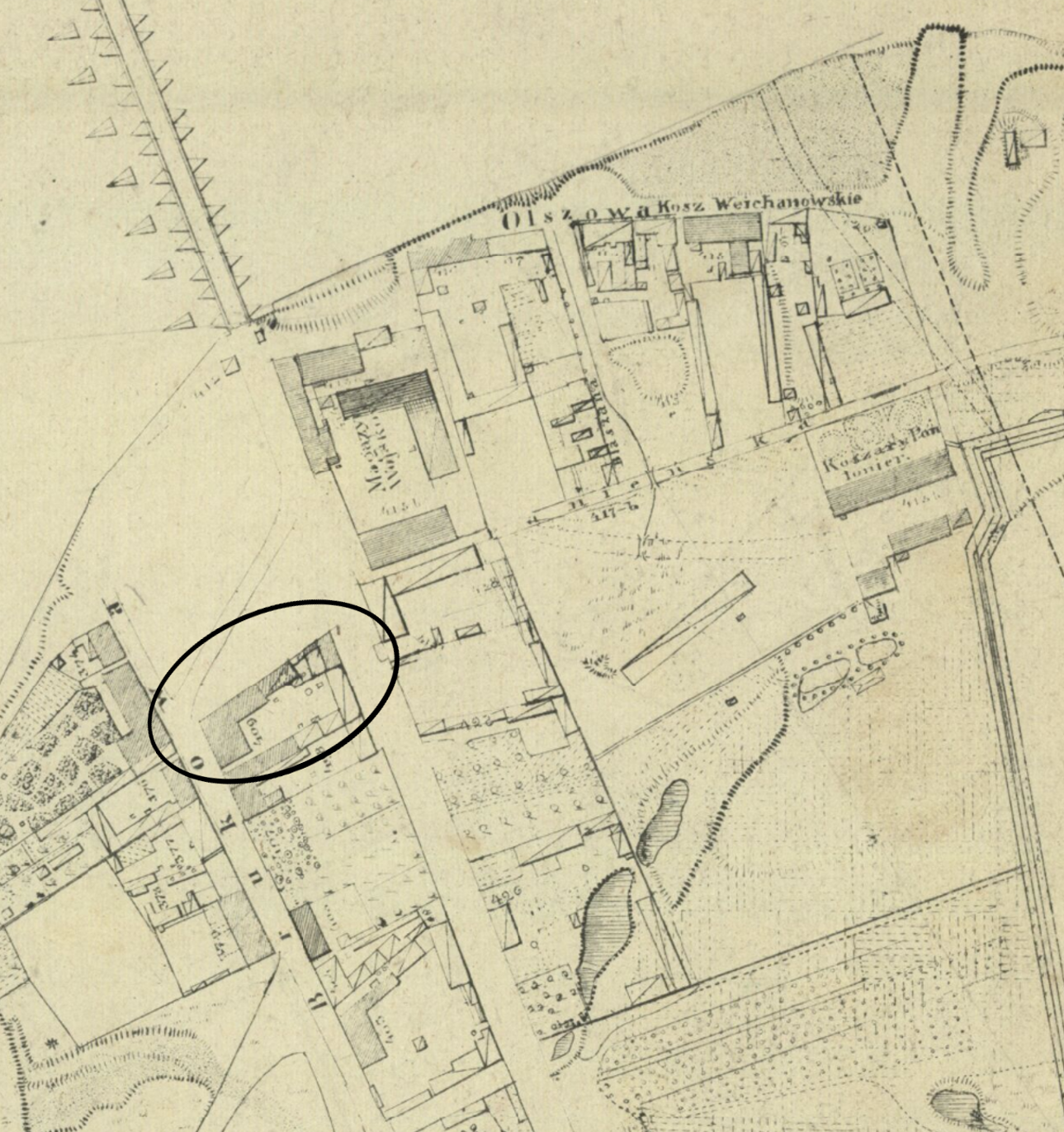
Skoryna family millstone factory and its surroundings on the plan of Praga. Mortgage plot 409 is marked with an oval

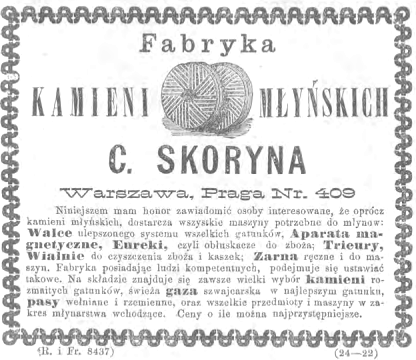
Advertisement for C. Skoryna's company in the Piotrków newspaper Tydzień, 1882

The Skoryna family's millstone factory, along with its surrounding area, was located on Brukowa Street in Warsaw's Praga district. This enterprise, established in the late 18th century, was managed by Cezary Skoryna upon his return to Warsaw. Previously run by his father, the business dated back to 1794, as noted in the Polish Biographical Dictionary. However, Cezary Skoryna organized its centenary celebrations in 1883.

Operating under the name "C. Skoryna", the company became a leading domestic manufacturer of milling machinery, which had previously been imported except for millstones. By 1881, the business employed 30 workers and had an annual turnover of 150,000 rubles. By 1885, employment had grown to 100, with an annual turnover of 500,000 rubles. Around 1890, the factory was relocated to a newly constructed facility on 14 Olszowa Street. The company later expanded with branches in Saint Petersburg and Chelyabinsk.

The scope of the business also expanded: in addition to traditional millstones, stones made from a specialized raw material with particularly good technological properties, imported for this purpose from France, were also produced. Furthermore, the factory became one of the first in the Congress Poland to start producing milling machines: devices for cleaning grain and cereals, driving components (steam and water motors, transmissions, shafts, gears, pulleys). Innovations were introduced in the product range. Skoryna's inventions included three-blade winnowing machines and abrasive planes in hulling machines. In 1890, Francis turbines, produced in-house, were introduced to the offer for industrial mills. The company also accepted orders for complete mills, from design and cost estimates to construction and equipment. The company also dealt in foreign goods, such as mill wheels, English leather transmission belts, and Swiss silk gauze.

"C. Skoryna" garnered numerous awards at industrial exhibitions, including a grand gold medal in Moscow (1872), a recognition diploma in Vienna (1873), a silver medal in Warsaw (1874), another silver medal in Paris (1878), and one more in Nizhny Novgorod (1896). Skoryna supported his business with advertising, producing illustrated catalogs and promotional materials, including a comprehensive brochure with milling advice published in 1902. The company advertised in newspapers in Warsaw and Piotrków Trybunalski.

At least since 1881, Cezary Skoryna was also a co-owner of the company "C. Skoryna and H. Neuendorff", located on Olszowa Street, property plot 415a or 415d. The company offered all kinds of products made from marble, sandstone, and granite, including tombstones and interior elements. On the Powązki Cemetery in Warsaw, tombstones from 1884 belonging to the Lortsch family and from 1883 belonging to the Kociołkiewicz family, both produced by the company, have been preserved.

In addition to his industrial ventures, Skoryna owned properties in Praga, including houses at 6 and 8 Panieńska Street.

=== Social activities ===
Cezary Skoryna was a member of the Literary Archconfraternity at St. John's Archcathedral, where he engaged in charitable work. He cared for the impoverished residents of Praga, providing affordable loans from his own funds to small-scale traders without regard to their religious affiliation.

He was also a member of the Society for the Encouragement of Fine Arts in Warsaw.

Skoryna acted as a caretaker for the cholera cemetery established in 1872 in Praga. Even after the city took it over in 1874, he funded a caretaker who not only resided there but also maintained the greenery. During the construction of a nearby railway line in 1874, he advocated for building an access road to the burial site. Later, he chaired a commission tasked with finding a new burial site in Praga, contributing to the selection of land for the Bródno Cemetery.

He also served on a municipal greenery commission in Praga, which helped establish several parks and squares. As a representative of the city's citizens, he participated in the military draft commission, ensuring the conscription process adhered to legal standards.

In 1884, he joined the committee to build a new church in Praga, headed by Archbishop Wincenty Teofil Popiel. His efforts culminated in the construction and consecration of St. Florian's Cathedral in 1901.

=== Family ===
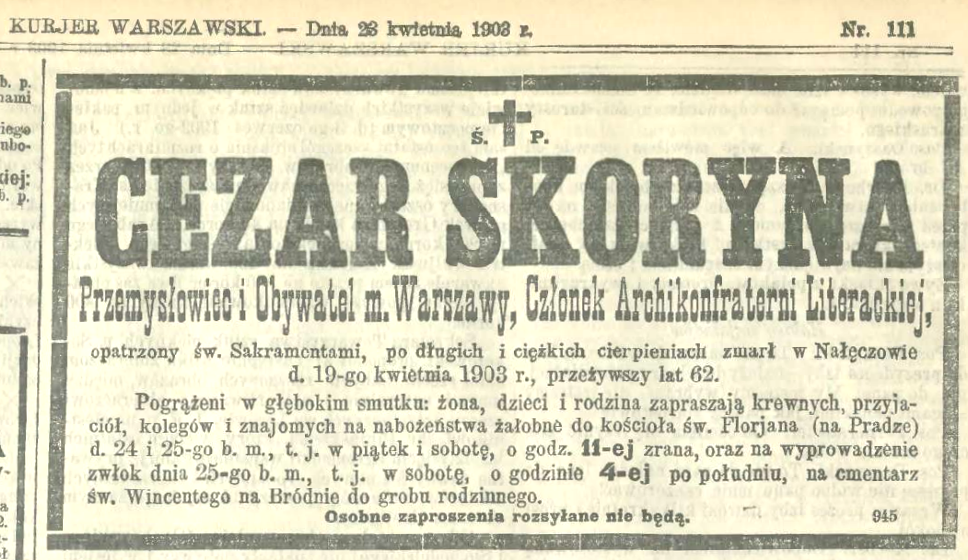
Obituary for Cezary Skoryna was published in Kurier Warszawski, issue 111, on 23 April 1903

Cezary Skoryna married Jadwiga Chełmińska in 1881. Their daughter, Cezara (1887–1979), a teacher, was married to Władysław Okręt (1870–1910). After his death, she took the surname Dickstein from her second husband. During the German occupation, she was a member of the underground organizations Polska Żyje and the Home Army. She was imprisoned in Pawiak, Berlin, and Ravensbrück. Their second daughter, Jadwiga Teresa, married Emil Rauer, an industrialist and independence activist, in 1910; however, the marriage ended in divorce. Cezary Skoryna's nephew, Jan Skoryna, became a colonel of engineers in the Polish Armed Forces.

Cezary Skoryna died on 19 April 1903 in Nałęczów and was buried in Bródno Cemetery. Kurier Warszawski commemorated him with a posthumous tribute, highlighting his pioneering role in the development of milling machinery in the Russian Partition and his extensive social contributions. As noted by the author of the obituary: "He passed away universally mourned among industrial circles and the citizens of Praga, and deeply lamented by his subordinates and workers, for whom he was a protector and a father".

== Later history of the company ==
After Cezary Skoryna's death, the company was managed by his family. A newspaper advertisement from 1907 indicates that the firm also operated from the property at 6 Olszowa Street during that period. In 1909, the company participated in the Industrial and Agricultural Exhibition in Częstochowa, showcasing its own pavilion and winning a gold medal in the mechanical industry category. At the time, the company was reportedly managed by engineer Antoni Skoryna, with an annual turnover of 300,000 rubles. Its production included over a thousand millstones made from imported stone annually, alongside a wide range of milling machinery and their power systems. According to contemporary press accounts, these products were distributed "not only throughout our country but also in Lithuania, Volhynia, Podolia, Livonia, Belarus, and the entire Empire".

According to entries in the Polish Biographical Dictionary, in 1914, the business was sold to Emil Rauer and his partner, P. Kozłowski. It is noted to have ceased operations in 1918. However, further context from surviving marriage records reveals that Emil Rauer married Cezary Skoryna's daughter, Jadwiga Teresa, in 1910, a detail unknown to the biographers of the Polish Biographical Dictionary.

Additionally, historian Jarosław Zieliński indicates that the enterprise continued to operate during the interwar period under the name Joint-Stock Company for the Production of Machinery "Młynotwórnia". As noted in a contemporary press article, it effectively became a branch of the Poznań-based Joint-Stock Company for the Production of Milling Machinery "Młynotwórnia".

The factory buildings at 14 Olszowa Street were destroyed in 1944 and never rebuilt. During the construction of a multi-family residential building in 2016, the investor excavated and removed the remnants of the factory structures. This sparked controversy over whether the remnants included elements of historical or cultural value. Media outlets reported on the issue, noting that the Warsaw Heritage Conservator filed a complaint regarding suspected violations of preservation laws.

C. Skoryna company

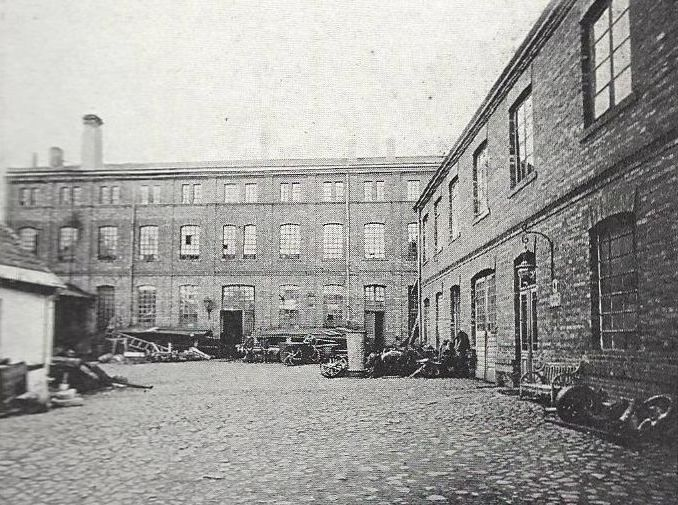
Headquarters of C. Skoryna at 14 Olszowa Street, circa 1905

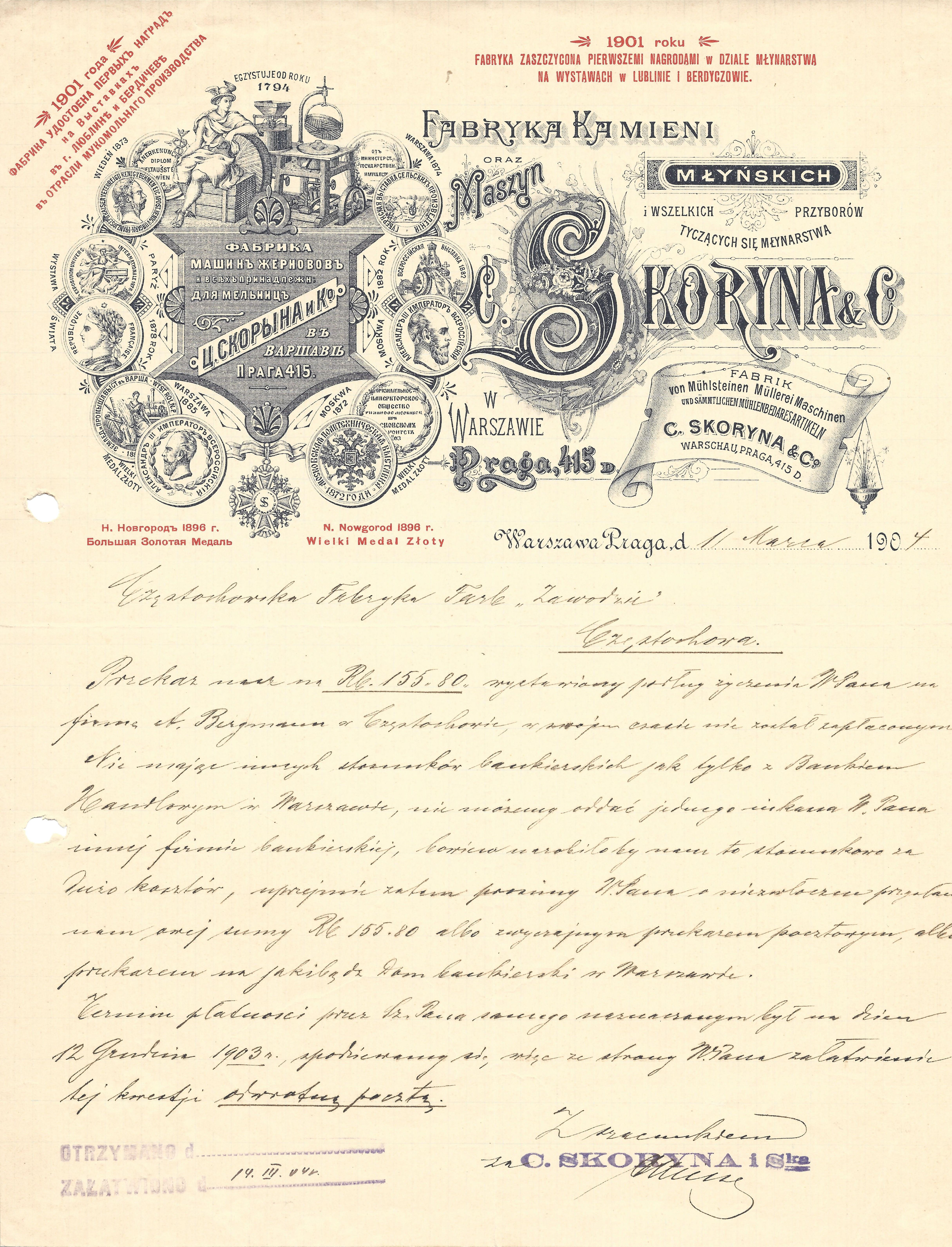
Letter on the company letterhead of C. Skoryna and Co., 1907

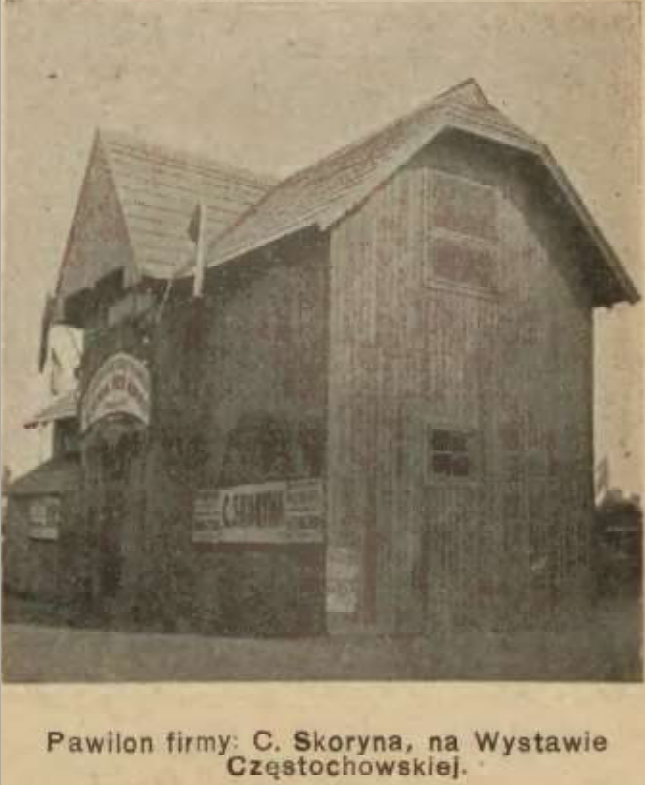
Pavilion of the C. Skoryna company at the Industry and Agriculture Exhibition in Częstochowa in 1909

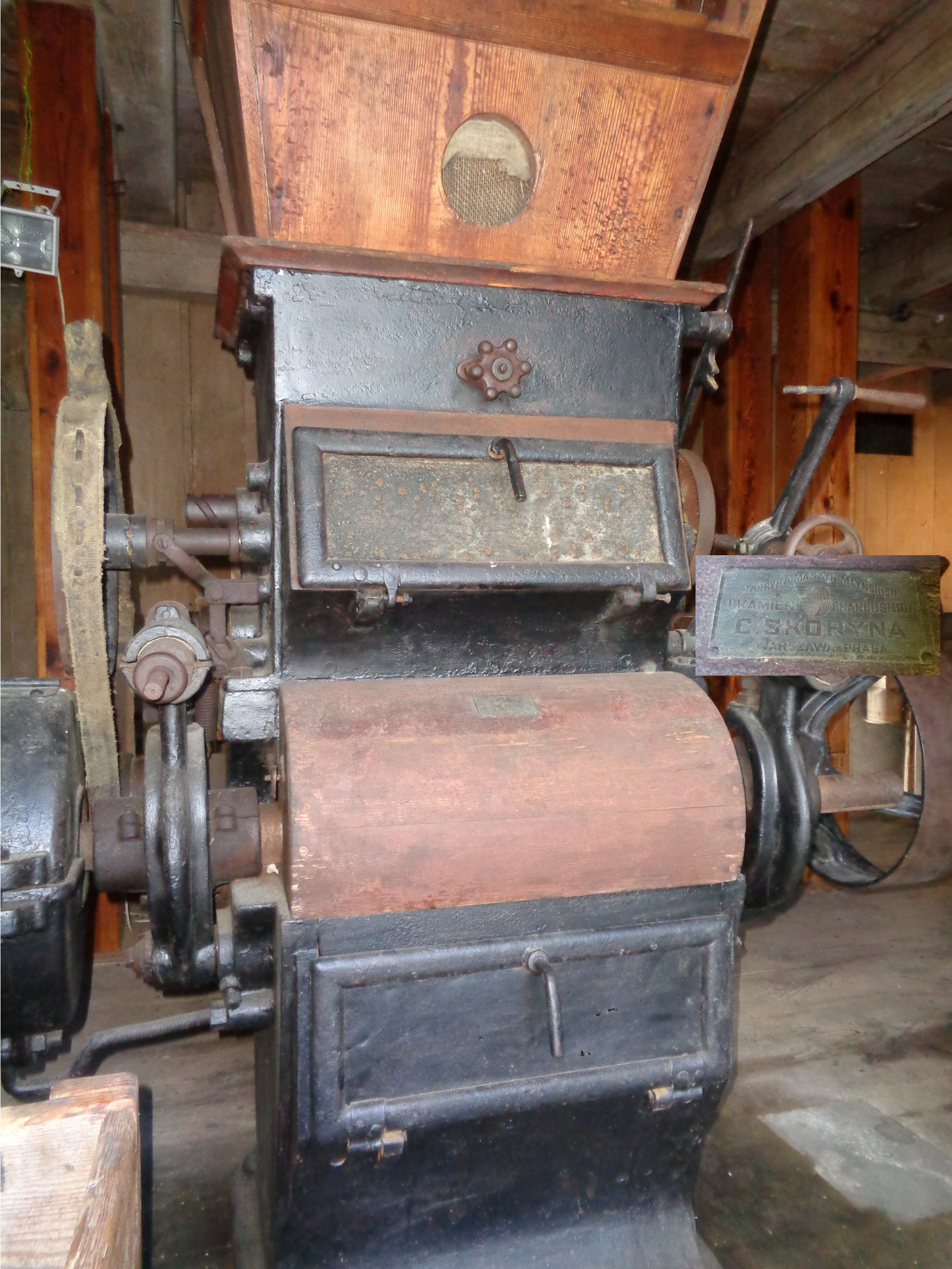
Roller mill produced by the C. Skoryna company, preserved in the mill in Niegów, with an enlargement of the nameplate
