= Paweł Wypych =

Polish politician (1968-2010)

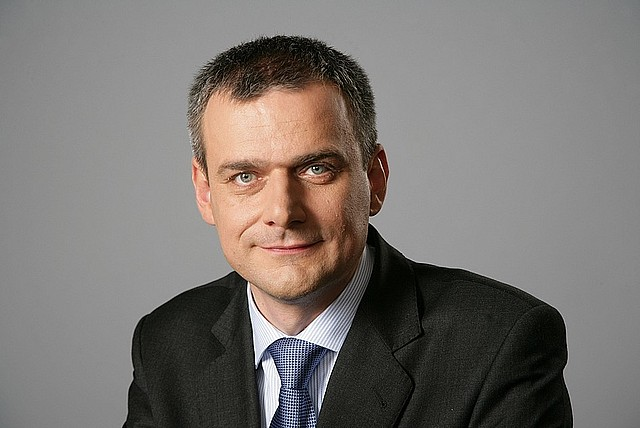
- Born: 20 February 1968; Otwock, Poland
- Died: 10 April 2010 (aged 42); Pechersk, Russia
- Occupation: Politician
- Spouse: Małgorzata Wypych

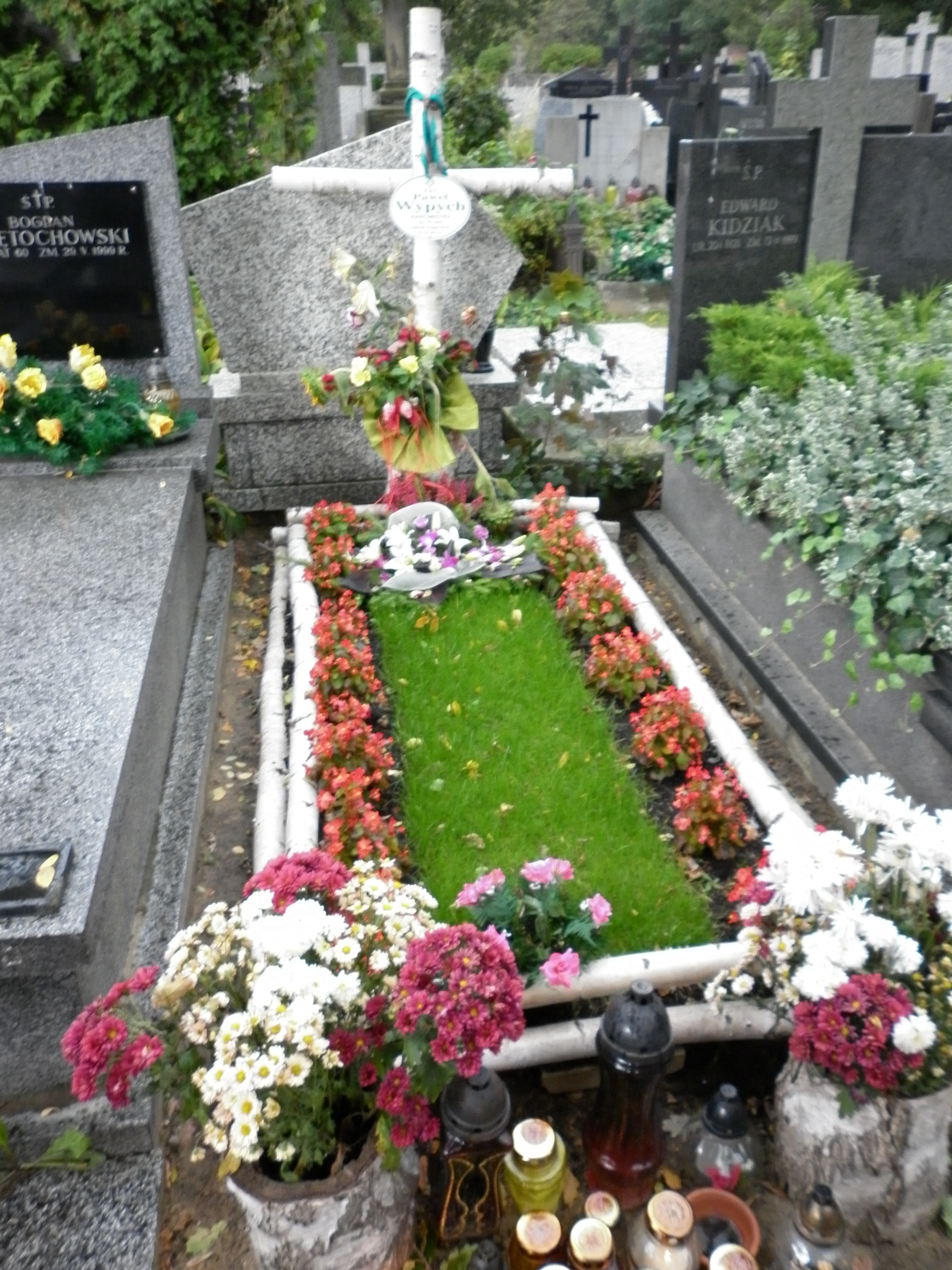
Grave of Paweł Wypych at Bródno Cemetery in Warszaw

Paweł Wypych (20 February 1968 – 10 April 2010) was a Polish politician, former Deputy Minister of Labor and Social Insurance president, and from 2009 the Secretary of State in the Chancellery of the President of Poland.

Wypych was born in Otwock. He was listed on the flight manifest of the Tupolev Tu-154 of the 36th Special Aviation Regiment carrying the President of Poland Lech Kaczyński which crashed near Smolensk-North airport near Pechersk near Smolensk, Russia, on 10 April 2010, killing all aboard.

Shortly after his death, on 16 April 2010, Wypych was posthumously awarded the Commander's Cross of the Order of Polonia Restituta, and on 17 April he received the Honorary Cross of the Scouting Association of the Republic - AD amīcum. He also received the Merit for the City of Warsaw on 9 September 2010.
