= Małgorzata Wypych =

Polish politician

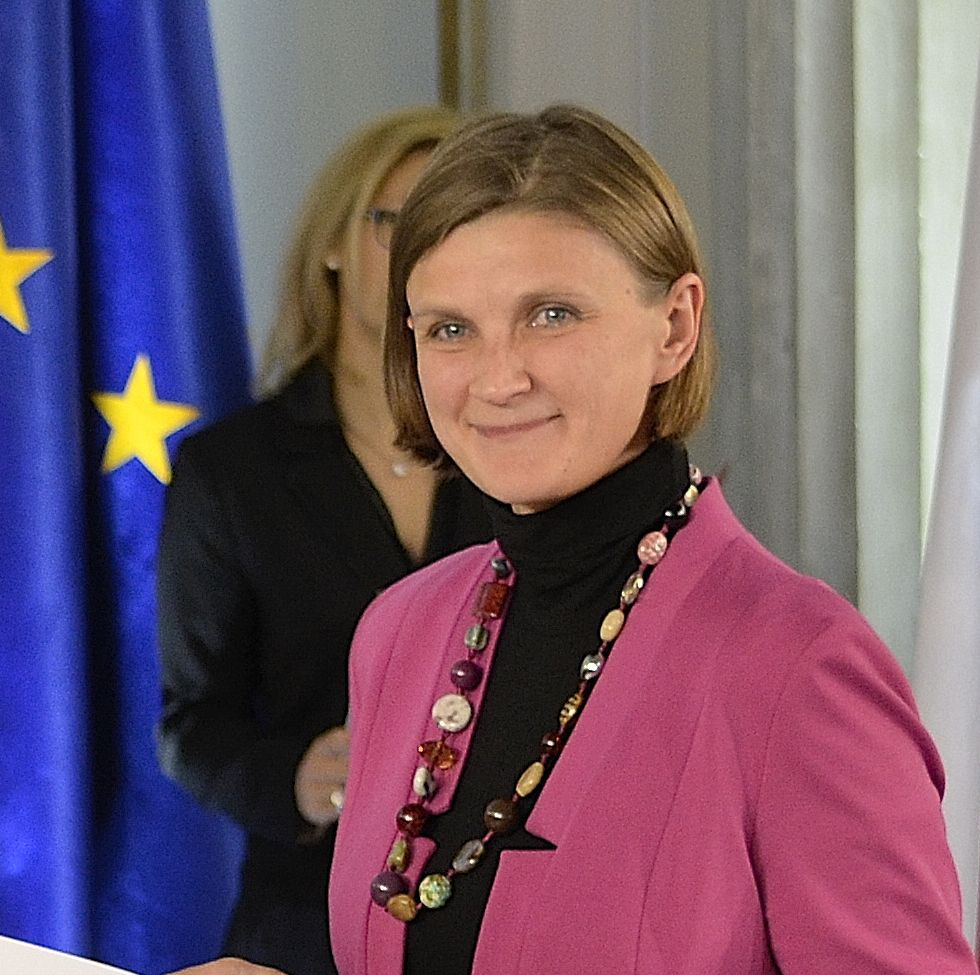
- Małgorzata Wypych in 2015
- Born: February 2, 1971 (age 55); Warsaw, Poland
- Education: Warsaw University
- Occupation: Politician
- Spouse: Paweł Wypych

Małgorzata Maria Wypych is a Polish politician. She serves as a member of the Polish Parliament.
