= Emil Rauer =

Polish industrialist, social activist, and independence fighter

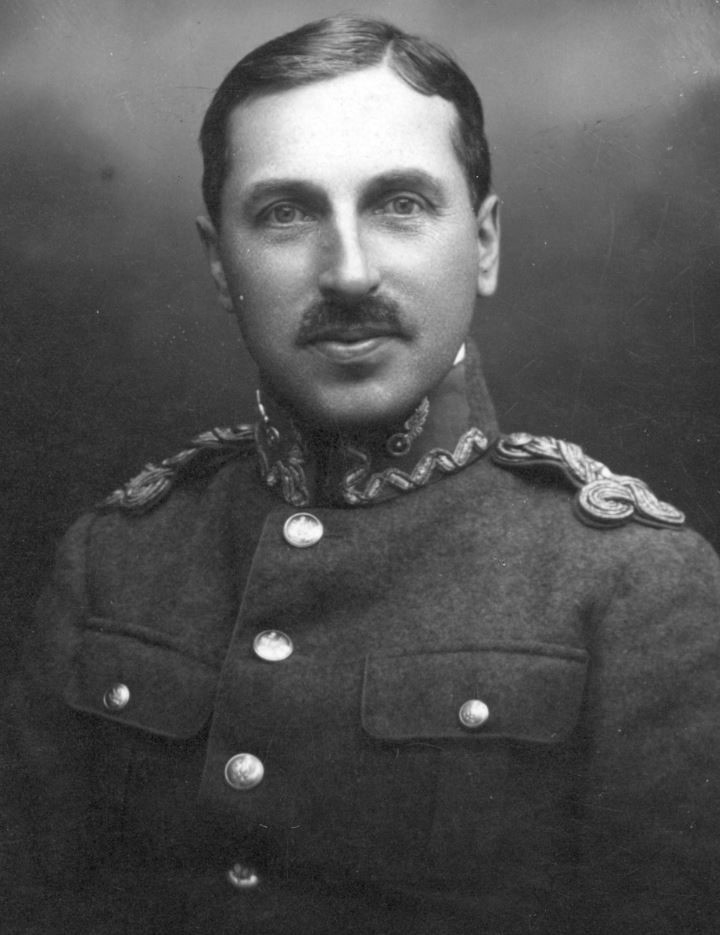
- Emil Rauer (c. 1920)
- Born: 31 July 1870; Irena
- Died: 13 December 1943 (aged 73); Warsaw
- Occupations: industrialist, military officer
- Honours: Order of Polonia Restituta, Cross of Valour, Cross of Merit, Cross of Independence

Signature
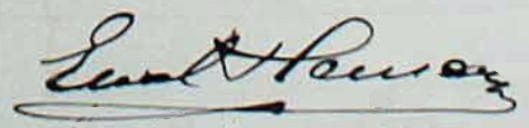

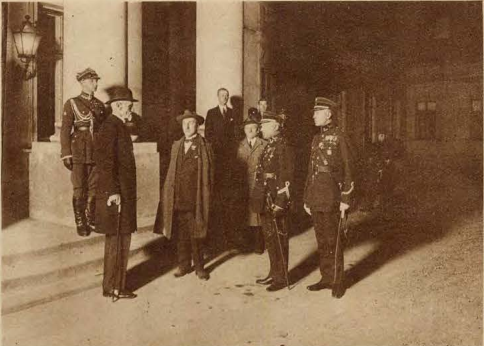
1925 anniversary celebrations of the Civic Guard and Police. Emil Rauer (the shorter figure, in the inspector's uniform with shoulder straps) and Commander Czyniowski present their report to President Stanisław Wojciechowski.

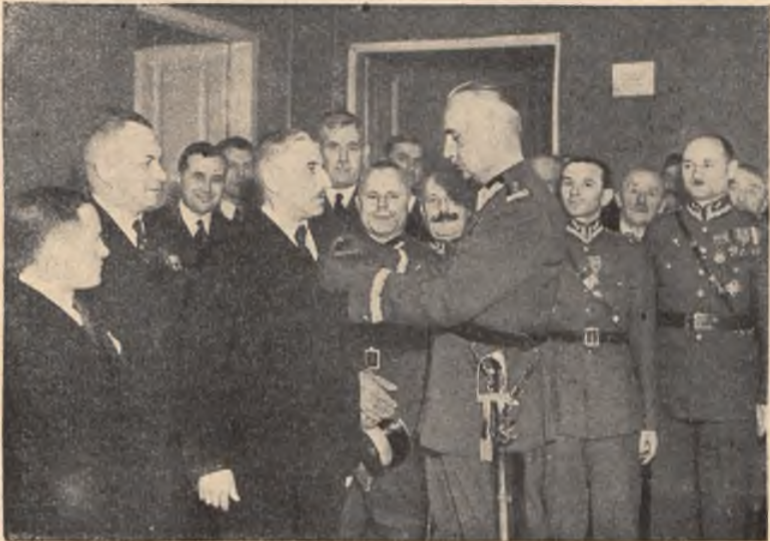
Emil Rauer being awarded the Order of Polonia Restituta by General Kazimierz Sosnkowski (1938)

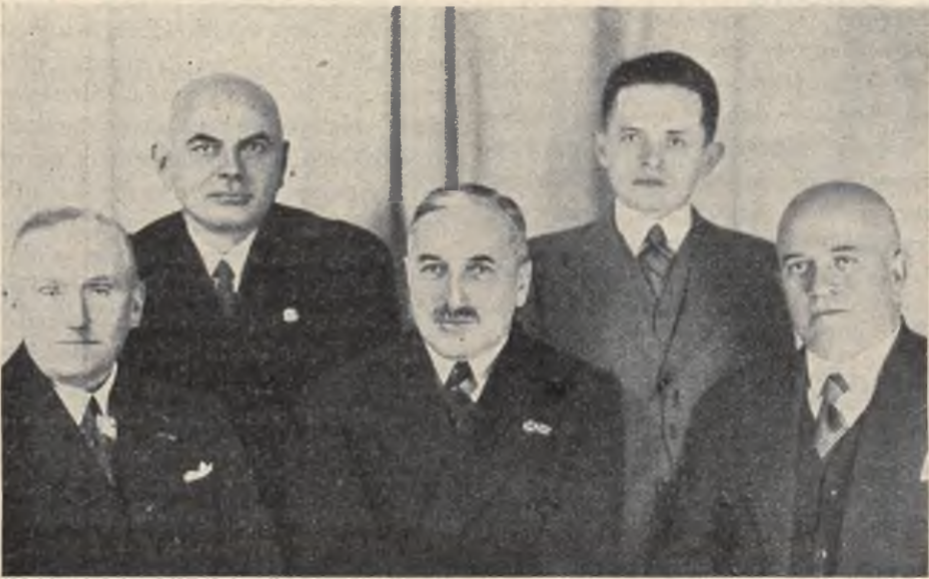
Members of the board of the Union of Former Participants of the Railway Security Guard, with President Emil Rauer in the center (1934)

Emil Ignacy Rauer (31 July 1870 – 13 December 1943) was a Polish industrialist, creator and commander of a railway protection formation, social activist, and independence fighter. He was initially a partner in companies producing metal decorations, milling machines, and later ammunition factories for the military. He was a long-time member of various leadership positions in the Sokół movement. During World War I, he co-founded and held various high positions in the Civic Guard and National Guard. He participated in the creation of the Railway Guard, which he later commanded after it was transformed into the Railway Security Guard. He led this formation during the Polish-Soviet War. Later, he was also a prominent activist in veteran organizations of the Second Polish Republic. In 1942, he was arrested by the Germans and imprisoned for about six months in Pawiak prison. A few months after his release, he died.

== Childhood and youth ==
Emil Rauer was born on 31 July 1870 in the village of Irena in the Puławy County (then the Nowoaleksandryjski County), as the son of Karol Rauer and Maria (née Pilny). He attended secondary school in Warsaw, where he was an active participant in self-education circles.

== Industrial activity ==
In 1899, Emil Rauer, in partnership with A. Makowski, founded a metal goods company that produced metal wreaths and flowers. The enterprise included a factory located in Warsaw (initially at 129 Jerusalem Avenue, later at 47 Stalowa Street), and retail outlets in Warsaw (22 Senatorska Street), Kyiv, and St. Petersburg. The company won a gold medal for its metal flowers at the 1909 Industrial and Agricultural Exhibition in Częstochowa. By around 1910, Emil Rauer became the sole shareholder of the company. In 1911, he was part of the board of the Warsaw Mutual Insurance Society for Mines.

In July 1914, together with his partner P. Kozłowski, he acquired a mill machinery and millstone factory in the Praga district of Warsaw, which had previously belonged to Cezary Skoryna, who died in 1903. Skoryna was the father of his second wife, Jadwiga (whom he married in 1910). The company ceased operations in 1918, but according to Jarosław Zieliński, it continued to function in the interwar period under the name Mill Machinery Manufacturing Company "Młynotwórnia". According to contemporary press articles, it essentially became a branch of the Poznań-based Joint-Stock Company of the Mill Machinery Factory "Młynotwórnia".

In 1921, Rauer, along with others, founded the Metal Industry "Granat" Joint-Stock Company in Warsaw. One of the company's locations was at the same address (22 Senatorska Street) as the previous factory. Initially, the company produced metalware and mechanical toys. In 1925, "Granat" acquired an industrial plant in Kielce and began producing ammunition components, fuses, and hand grenades for the Polish army and for export. Emil Rauer remained on the board of "Granat" until 1939.

== Activity in the Sokół movement and other sports organizations ==
Since 1906, Emil Rauer had been the president of the second branch of the Sokół movement in Warsaw, which he founded. After it was banned by the authorities in June 1907, he transformed it into the Sports Enthusiasts Circle. In the meantime, at the first convention in 1906, he was elected to the Main Department (equivalent to the General Board) of Sokół in Congress Poland. In the autumn of 1915, he founded the sixth branch of Sokół in the Praga district of Warsaw, where he remained president for many years. He continued his involvement in the leadership of Sokół, and in 1919, he was elected to the board and organized the gathering of its members in July 1921. In 1920, he served as the president of the First Branch of Sokół in Warsaw.

He was also involved in the establishment of the Praga Sports Society in December 1916 and became its president. He was elected a member of the council of the Riflemen's Brotherhood in Warsaw in 1921, and also served as vice-president of the Union of Sports and Social Societies. He continued in this role after the union changed its name in 1926 to the Union of Polish Associations.

== Political activity ==
Emil Rauer held numerous positions in Warsaw. In 1916, he was part of the management of the Compulsory Supplies Section of the Warsaw Municipal Board and served as an inspector in the Morality Guard Division.

Rauer is also reported to have led the Polish Fascist Organization, a small party established in 1925. At its peak in April 1926, it had around 100 members in Warsaw but failed to mobilize for active participation during the May Coup. The organization's activity ceased in 1927. Additionally, in January 1925, Rauer became the commander of the Order and Discipline Guard, an ultra-right nationalist organization according to police evaluations at the time. Its membership, also estimated at about 100, primarily came from military and sports circles.

In May 1927, Rauer was elected to the City Council on the Christian Democracy ticket and served on its Suburban and Electoral Committees.

He was involved in organizing the 125th anniversary of the Constitution of 3 May 1791 in 1916 and the 130th anniversary of the Battle of Praga in 1924. Rauer also served as the treasurer of the National Votive Committee for building the Church of Divine Providence in Warsaw and was the chairman of the financial committee for constructing the monument to Jan Kiliński.

Rauer also played a role in the creation of the Tomb of the Unknown Soldier in Warsaw. Despite early discussions, disagreements over its location and design delayed the project. On 2 December 1924, the Union of Polish Associations of the Republic of Poland secretly placed a stone slab inscribed To the Unknown Soldier beneath the Prince Józef Poniatowski Monument in front of the Saxon Palace. Three days later, Rauer anonymously added an eternal flame to the site. This de facto memorial influenced the establishment of the permanent Tomb of the Unknown Soldier under the Saxon Palace colonnade in 1925. The identity of those involved was revealed only years later.

In the field of education, Rauer was vice-president of the Praga chapter of the Polish Educational Society in 1916 and chaired the Praga section supporting education through the May Fundraiser. In August 1917, he joined the supervisory board of the Władysław IV Gymnasium. He was also a board member of the Polish Educational Society during the 1920s.

Rauer was among the founders of the Society of Friends of Praga, established in April 1915, and later served on its board, including as vice-president from 1916 and president in the 1920s. In 1917, he co-founded the Union of Praga Associations and became one of its vice-chairmen.

== Service in military formations ==
In July 1914, Emil Rauer co-organized the Civic Guard, serving from August 1915 as one of its deputy commanders and head of the supply department. Between 1916 and 1917, he completed non-commissioned officer, officer, and instructor courses organized by the Polish Military Organization in Warsaw under the auspices of Sokół. In 1918, he co-founded the National Guard and became commander of its 5th District; in November of that year, he participated with his unit in disarming German forces.

From 1918 to 1920, Rauer served in railway protection formations. In November 1918, acting on behalf of the Ministry of Railways, he began organizing the Railway Guard, starting with the Warsaw Directorate and later expanding to include the Radom Directorate. By the end of April 1919, the Railway Guard was militarized and transformed into the Railway Security Guard, tasked with protecting railway infrastructure. Rauer assumed command over the Warsaw, Radom, and Vilnius directorates. When the Railway Security Guard established a General Command in late May 1919, he became its overall commander, delegating leadership of the Warsaw Directorate to others.

On 1 February 1920, the Railway Security Guard structures in the Warsaw, Lublin, Kielce, Łódź, and Białystok provinces, as well as in the capital city of Warsaw, were integrated into the State Police. According to Railway Security Guard's own published history, Rauer left service at that point. However, the Polish Biographical Dictionary reports that during the Polish-Soviet War in July 1920, Rauer led a Railway Security Guard company in defending the railway line between Stanisławów and Lviv, leaving military service only at the end of 1920. This discrepancy might be explained by a Railway Security Guard brochure suggesting Rauer was expected to assume command in the Eastern Borderlands, where the Vilnius Directorate already existed, and the Volhynia Directorate was being formed – areas not incorporated into the police force.

Later, Rauer co-founded the Union of Former Participants of the Railway Security Guard and held leadership positions, including serving as its president. He was also a board member of the Federation of Polish Associations of Defenders of the Homeland. During the interwar period, he held the rank of colonel.

== Private life ==
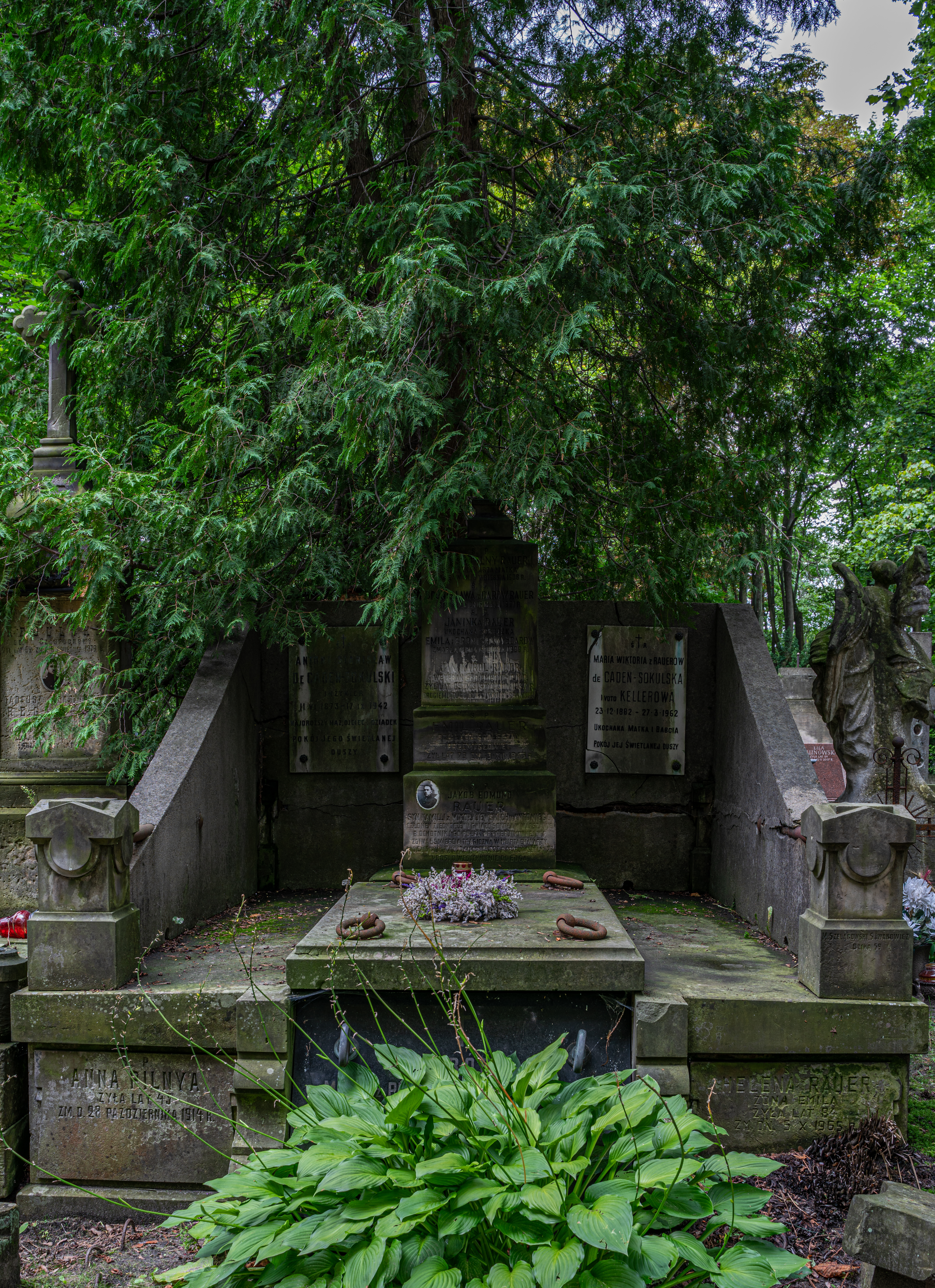
Grave of Emil Rauer at Powązki Cemetery in Warsaw

Emil Rauer was married three times. His first wife was Bronisława (née Car), whom he married on 21 August 1897. She died in 1901, and they had a daughter, Janina, who died in childhood. His second marriage was to Jadwiga (née Skoryna), daughter of industrialist and social activist Cezary Skoryna (1841–1903). They married on 9 June 1910 but later divorced. His third wife was Helena (née Makowiecka), whom he married on 26 June 1927. Helena outlived him and died in 1965.

== Prison sentence and death ==
The Polish Biographical Dictionary indicates that Rauer's fate at the beginning of World War II remains unclear. However, it is known that he was arrested by the Germans on 10 November 1942 and held in Pawiak prison. According to the memoirs of a fellow prisoner, Rauer was described as "very weak and exhausted, at times near death". He was released on 10 May 1943 in such a poor state that, according to the Polish Biographical Dictionary, he died in Warsaw in the autumn of the same year. He was buried at Powązki Cemetery (section 211-1-10,11), and his gravestone lists his date of death as 13 December 1943.

== Orders and decorations ==
- Officer's Cross of the Order of Polonia Restituta (10 November 1938)
- Cross of Valour
- Golden Cross of Merit (20 September 1925)
- Cross of Independence (23 December 1933)
