= Pechersk (selo), Smolensky District, Smolensk Oblast =

Rural locality on Russia

Coordinates: 54°51′11″N 32°01′55″E

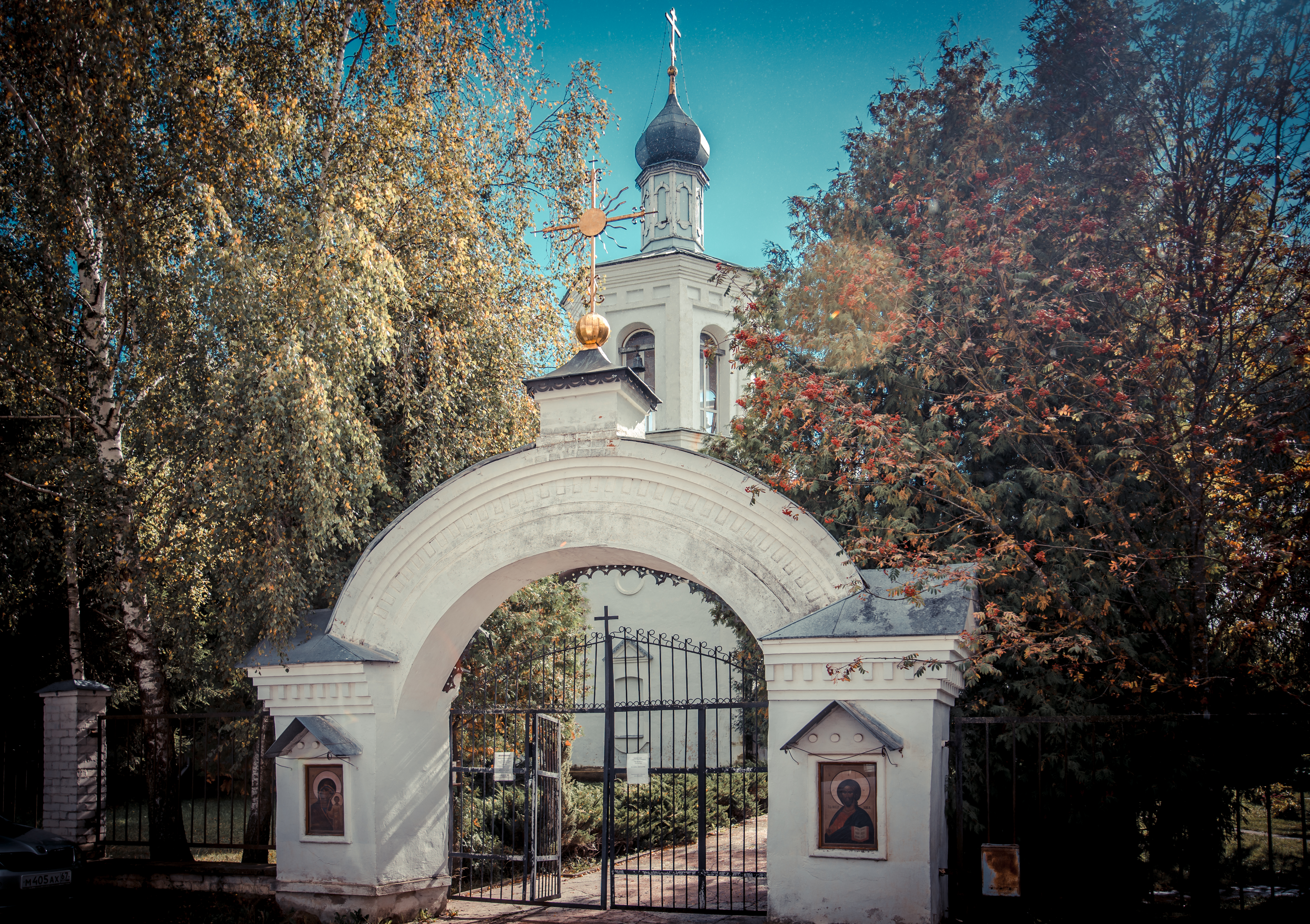
Church of Anthony and Theodosius of the Caves in Pechersk, Smolensk district, Smolensk region

Pechersk (Russian: Пече́рск), also spelled Pechyorsk (Печёрск), is a rural locality (a selo) in Smolensky District of Smolensk Oblast, Russia, located 7 kilometers (4.3 mi) north of Smolensk. Population: 3,884 (2010 census); 3,750 (2002 census); 4,067 (1998 est.).

== Etymology ==
The name "Pechersk" is derived from the Old Russian word "печера", meaning "cave".

== History ==
In 1859, it had an Orthodox church and a population of nineteen (ten male and nine female), living in five homesteads. Administratively, it was a part of Smolensky Uyezd of Smolensk Governorate.

Until December 28, 2004, it had a status of a settlement.

On April 10, 2010, a Tupolev Tu-154M aircraft of the Polish 36th Special Aviation Regiment crashed near Smolensk-North air base near Pechersk, killing the President of Poland Lech Kaczyński and other Polish officials.
