= Praga =

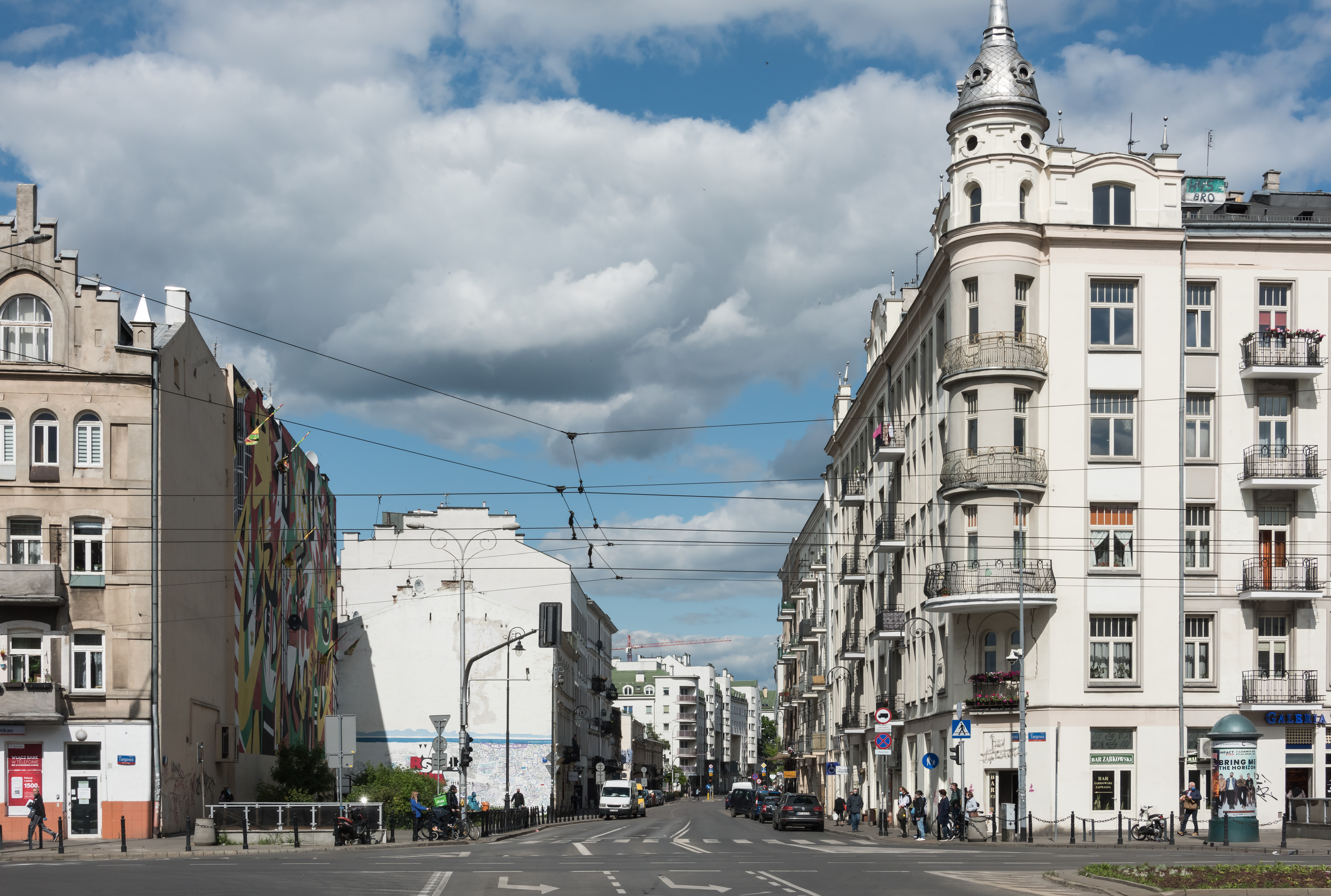
- Ulica Ząbkowska, one of Praga's main streets

- Location of Praga-Północ and Praga-Południe within Warsaw
- Coordinates: 52.25198°N 21.05083°E
- Country: Poland
- Voivodeship: Masovian
- County/City: Warsaw
- Within city limits: 1791
- Time zone: UTC+1 (CET)
  - Summer (DST): UTC+2 (CEST)

Praga (Polish pronunciation: [ˈpra.ɡa]) is a district of Warsaw, Poland. It is on the east bank of the river Vistula. First mentioned in 1432, until 1791 it formed a separate town with its own city charter.

== History ==
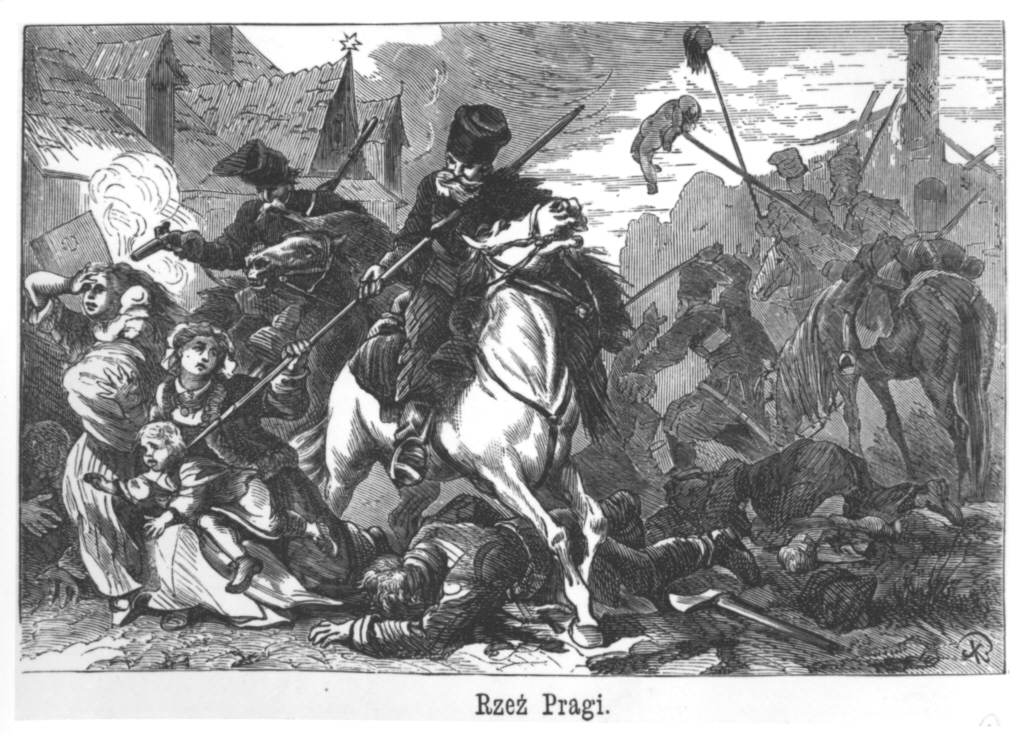
Massacre of Praga (1794)

The historical Praga was a small settlement located at the eastern bank of the Vistula river, directly opposite the towns of Old Warsaw and Mariensztat, both being parts of Warsaw now. First mentioned in 1432, it derived its name from the Polish verb prażyć, meaning to burn or to roast, as it occupied a forested area that was burnt out to make place for the village. Separated from Warsaw by a wide river, it developed independently of the nearby city, and on 10 February 1648 king Władysław IV of Poland granted Praga with a city charter. However, as it was mostly a suburb and most buildings were wooden, the town was repeatedly destroyed by fires, floods and foreign armies. Currently the only surviving historical monument from that epoch is the Church of Our Lady of Loreto.

Although there were numerous attempts to build a permanent bridge across the river, none succeeded and Praga remained a separate entity well into the 18th century. Communication between the capital and Praga was maintained by privately run ferries and, in the winter, over the ice. Finally, in 1791, during the reign of Stanisław August Poniatowski, Praga was attached to Warsaw as a borough.

The Battle of Praga, or the Battle of Warsaw, was a Russian assault during the Kościuszko Uprising in 1794. It was followed by a massacre in which 12,000 inhabitants of the Praga district lost their lives.

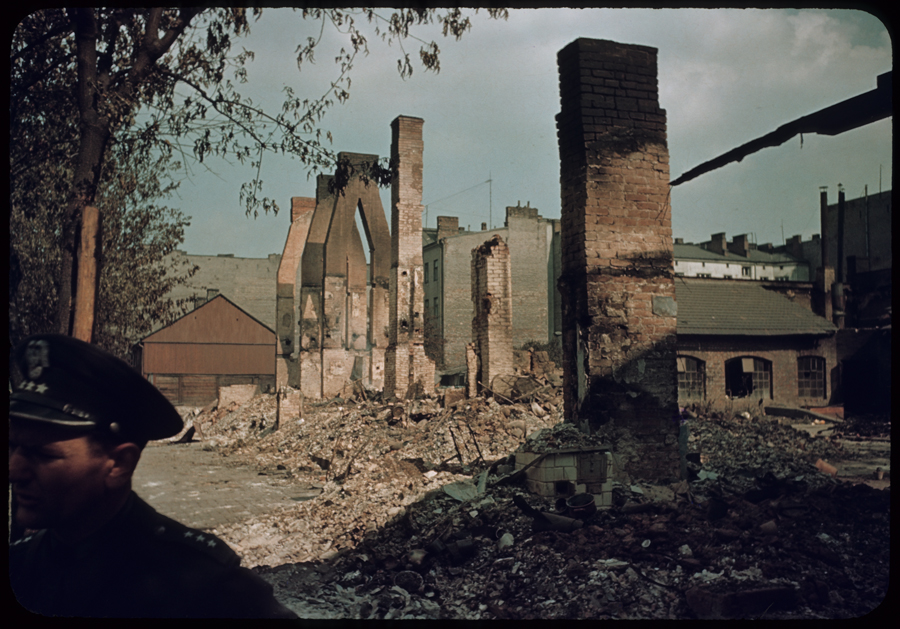
Praga after German bombardment in September 1939

During the German occupation of Poland in World War II, in 1944, the German administration operated a subcamp of the Oflag 73 prisoner-of-war camp for officers in Praga. Unlike the central parts of Warsaw, Praga remained relatively untouched during the war and in the postwar period of reconstruction, the capital was home to many ministries and public facilities.

Because of the traditional separate status of Praga, there are two Catholic dioceses in Warsaw: Archdiocese of Warsaw with St. John's Cathedral and Diocese of Warsaw-Praga with St. Florian's Cathedral.

The derelict district experienced a revival following the end of Communism in 1989, as young artists moved into many of the former factory buildings, drawing crowds in search of something different from the Old Town. The increasing popularity of the area helped to change it into one of Poland's and Europe's creative hubs as it has been described as one of the "trendiest neighbourhood across Europe".

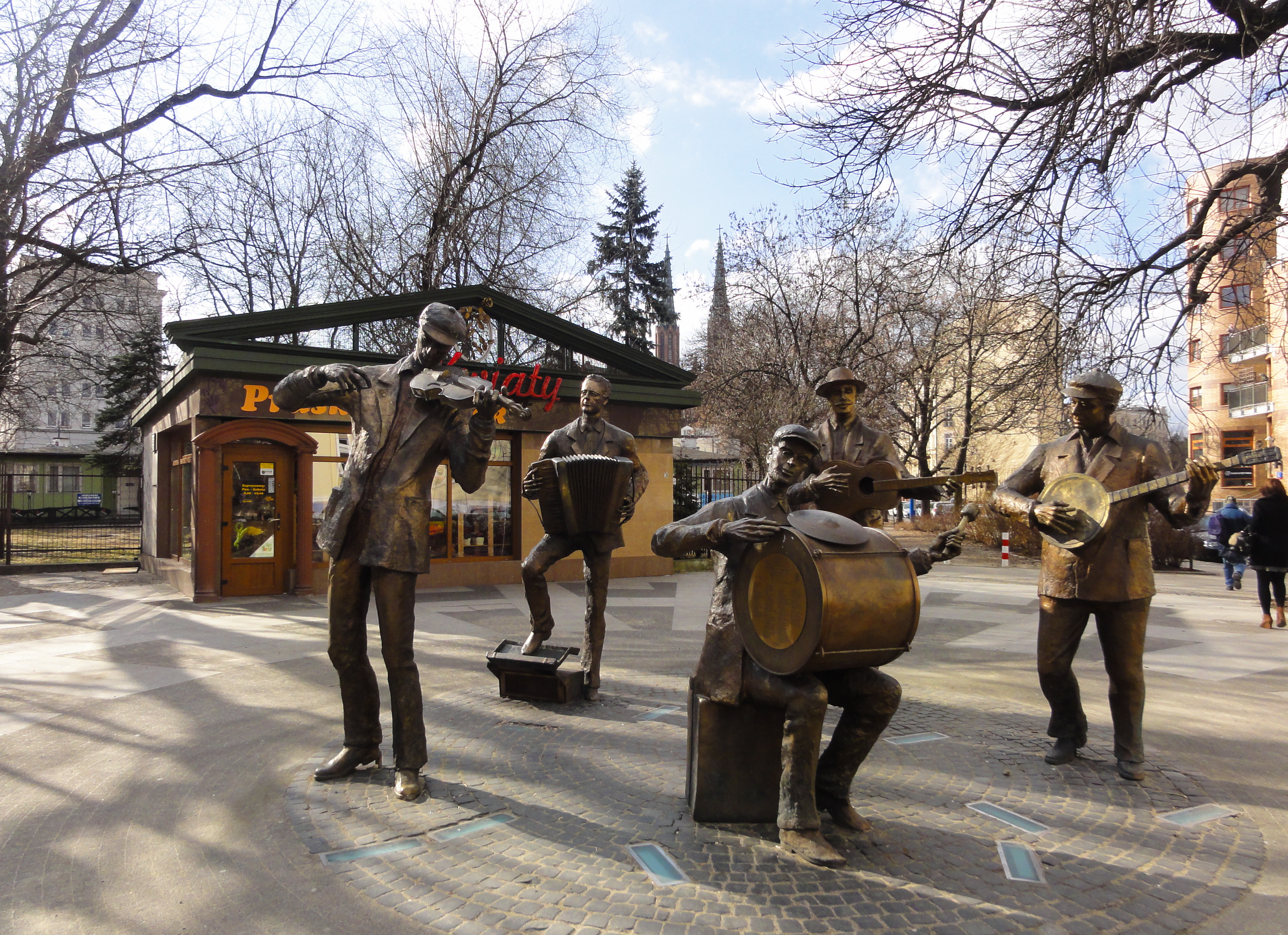
A lifesize group sculpture of street musicians in Praga

In 2011 the local Monument to Brotherhood in Arms was taken down; in 2015 this decision was made permanent.

== Administrative division ==
Currently Praga is administratively divided into:

- Praga-Północ (Praga North)
- Praga-Południe (Praga South)

Praga-Południe and Praga-Północ include neighborhoods of:

- Saska Kępa
- Grochów
- Szmulowizna
- Gocław
- Kamionek

In the wider sense, all areas of Warsaw located on the right bank of Vistula are also known under the collective term of Praga. Besides historical Praga, they include:

- Białołęka
- Rembertów
- Targówek
- Wawer
- Wesoła

== Sights and landmarks ==
Sights of Praga (examples)

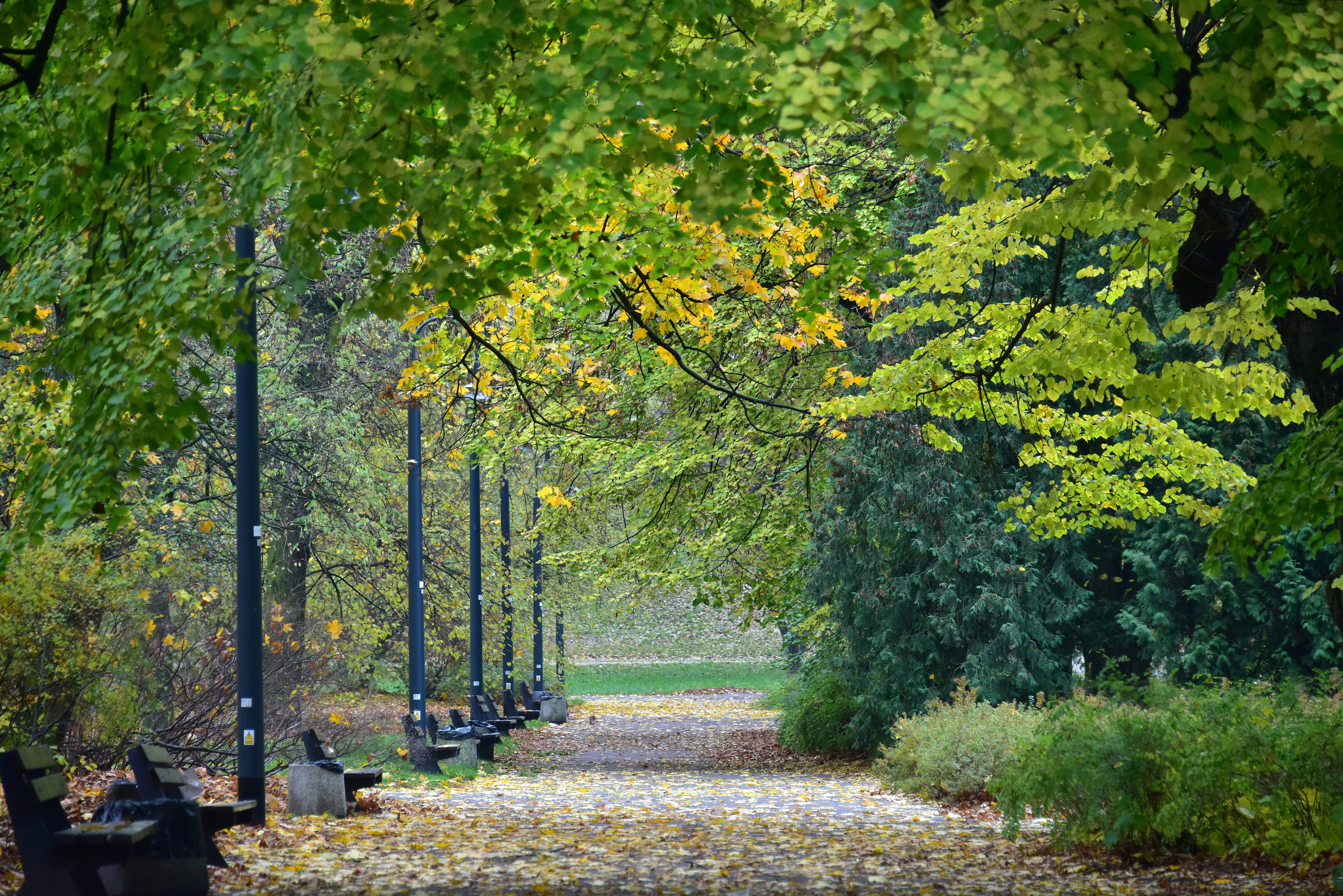
Praga Park

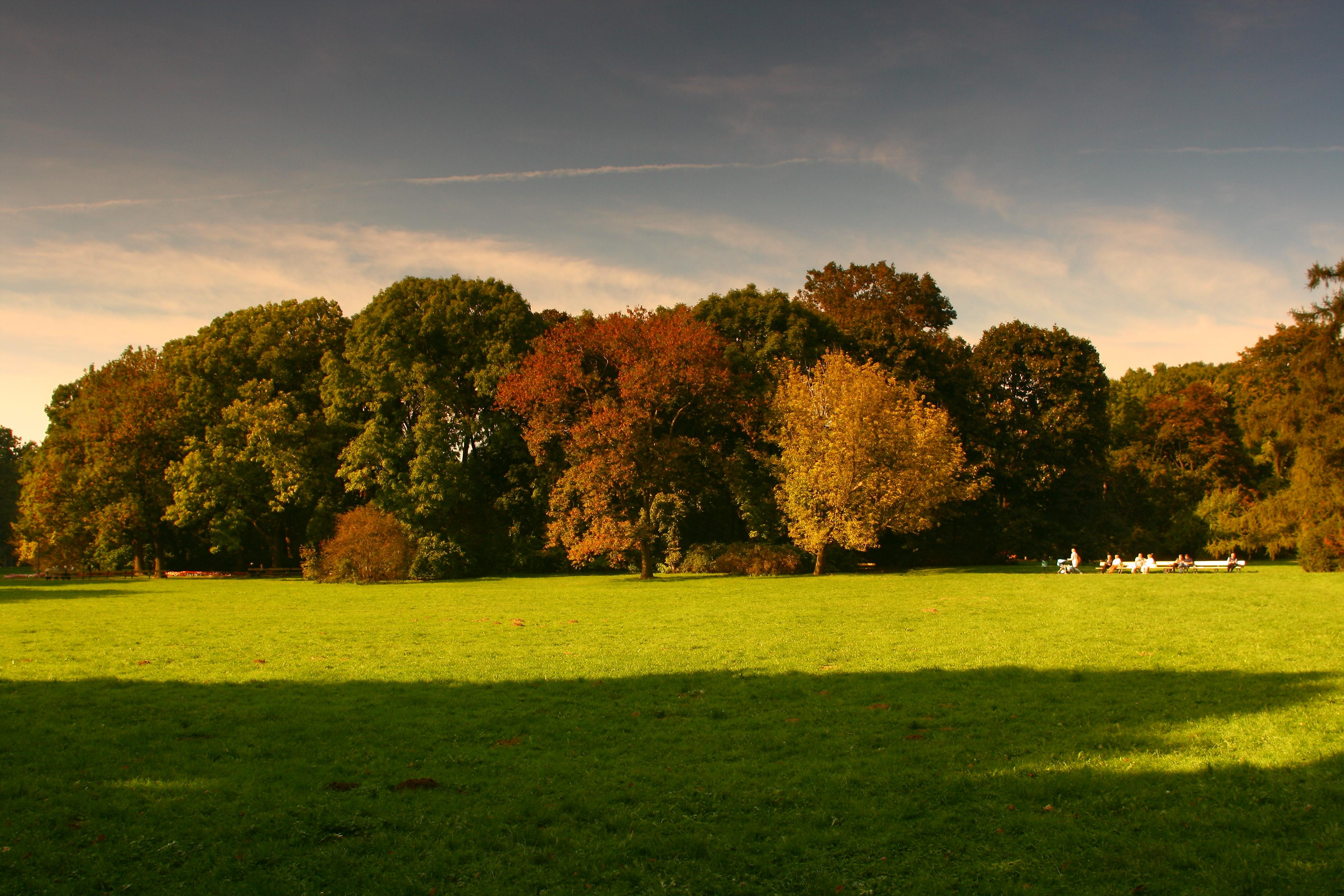
Skaryszew Park

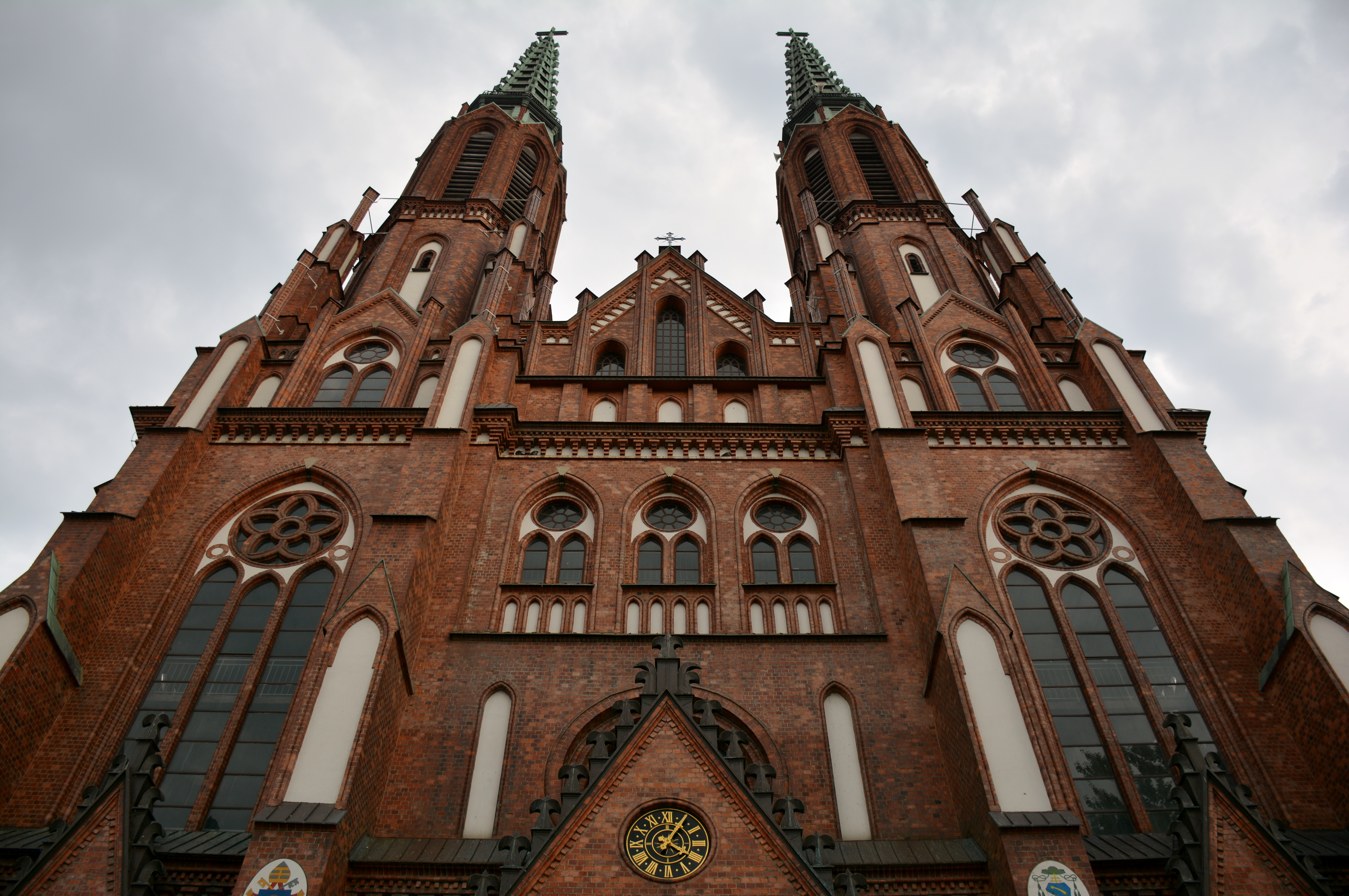
St. Florian's Cathedral

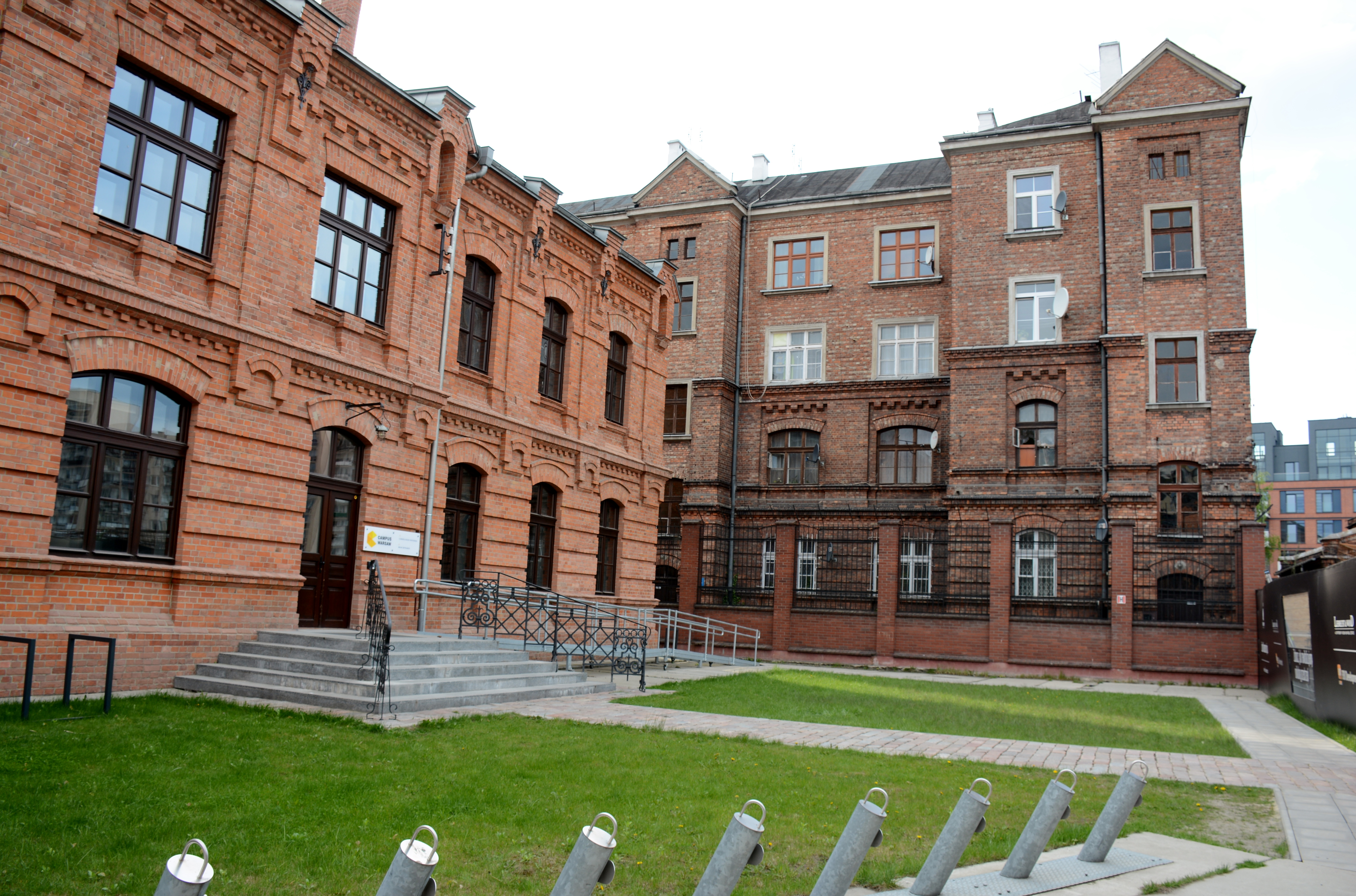
Praga Koneser Center

- Praga Park
- Skaryszew Park
- Warsaw Zoo
- Museum of Praga
- Neon Museum in Warsaw
- Praga Koneser Center
- St. Florian's Cathedral
- Baroque Church of Our Lady of Loreto
- Cathedral of St. Mary Magdalene
- Kazimierz Górski National Stadium

== Transport ==
The Warszawa Wschodnia railway station, Warsaw's second largest railway station and the sixth busiest station in Poland (as of 2021), is located in Praga.
