= Eliza Orzeszkowa Memorial (Praga-Północ) =

Sculpture in Warsaw, Poland

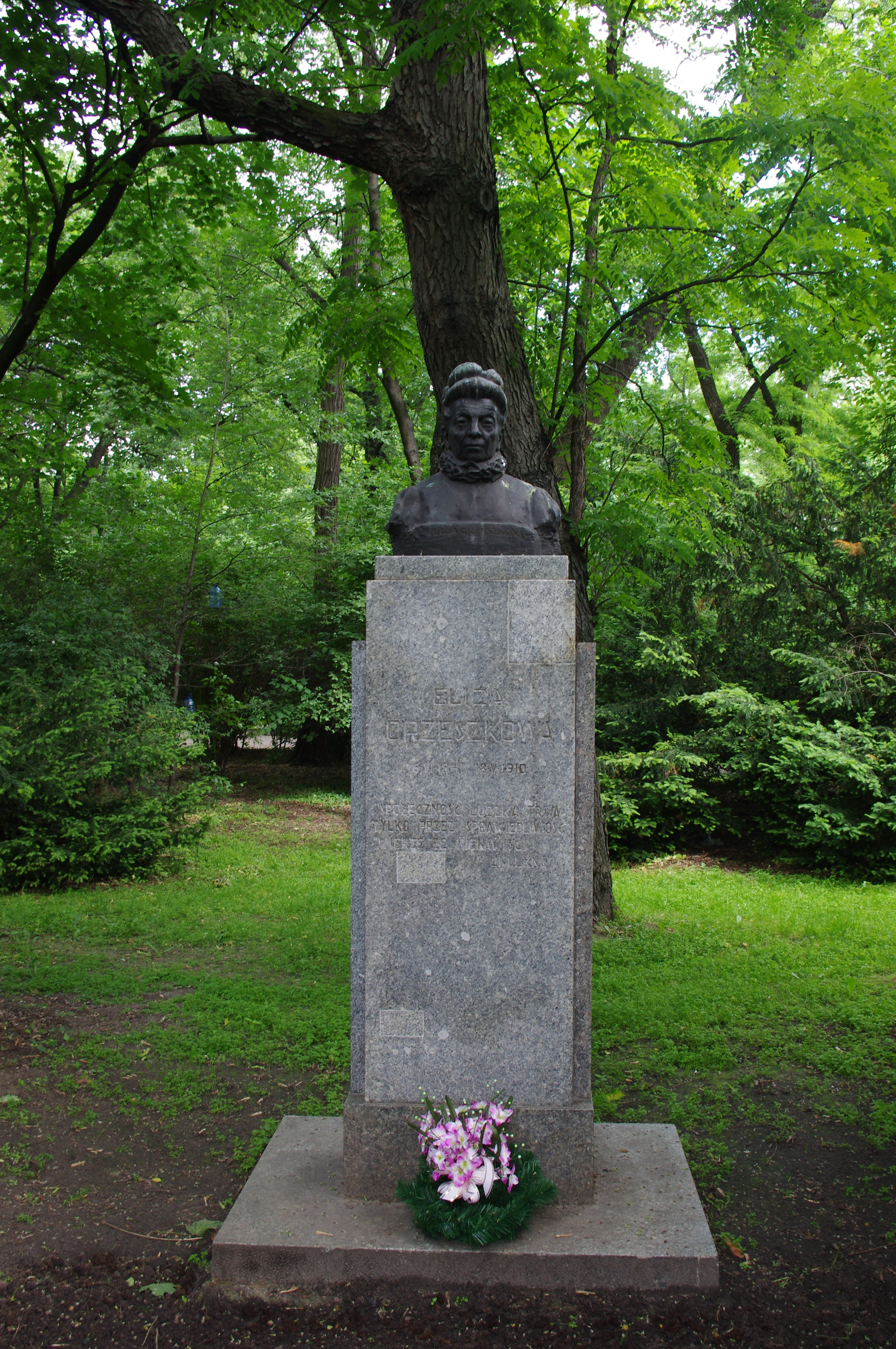
- The monument in 2012.
- Interactive map of Eliza Orzeszkowa Memorial
- Location: Praga Park, Praga-Północ, Warsaw, Poland
- Coordinates: 52°15′13.5″N 21°01′33.5″E
- Designer: Henryk Kuna
- Type: Bust on pedestal
- Material: Bronze (bust); Granite (pedestal)
- Height: 2.5 m (8 ft 2 in)
- Completion date: 1908
- Opening date: 30 October 1938
- Dedicated to: Eliza Orzeszkowa

The Eliza Orzeszkowa Memorial (Polish: Pomnik Elizy Orzeszkowej) is a sandstone sculpture in Warsaw, Poland, located in Na Książecem Park, next to Książeca Street, within the South Downtown neighbourhood. It has a form of a bust of Eliza Orzeszkowa, a 19-century writer and novelist. The sculpture was designed by Henryk Kuna in 1918, and unveiled at the current location on 30 October 1938.

== History ==
The sculpture was made in 1908 by Henryk Kuna, during his visit to Eliza Orzeszkowa in Grodno. On 30 October 1938, it was unveiled in Praga Park in Warsaw, as a monument dedicated to her. The ceremony was attended by the city mayor, Stefan Starzyński, as well as numerous members of cultural and feminist circles. It was renovated on 2003, and re-unveiled on its 65th anniversary.

== Characteristics ==
The monument consists of a bronze bust of Eliza Orzeszkowa, placed on a granite pedestal, and has the total height of 2.5 m. It is placed in the Paraga Park, near Kazimierz Lisiecki "Dziadek" Avenue. The pedestal features the following Polish inscription:

Polish text

Eliza Orzeszkowa
6.6.1841 – 18.5.1910
Społeczność ludzka trwa
tylko przez sprawiedliwość
Wierzę, że nienawiści
umilkną

Translation:
English translation

Eliza Orzeszkowa
6 June 1841 – 18 May 1910
Human society endures
only through justice
I believe that hatred
will fall silent

== Gallery ==
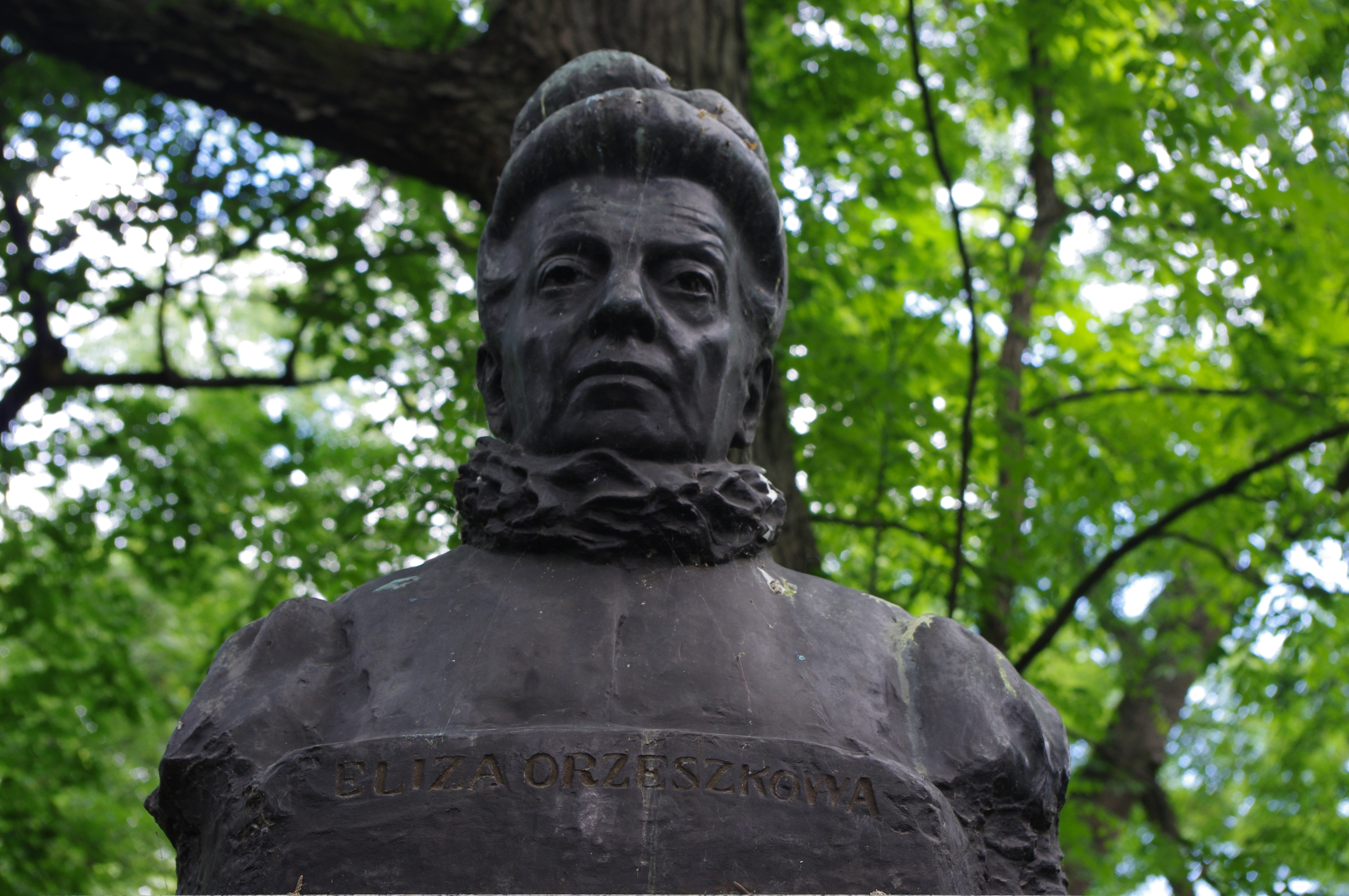
Bust of Eliza Orzeszkowa.
