= Monument to the Brotherhood in Arms =

Polish war memorial in Warsaw

Coordinates: 52°15′18″N 21°02′04″E

Monument to Brotherhood in Arms
- Pomnik Braterstwa Broni
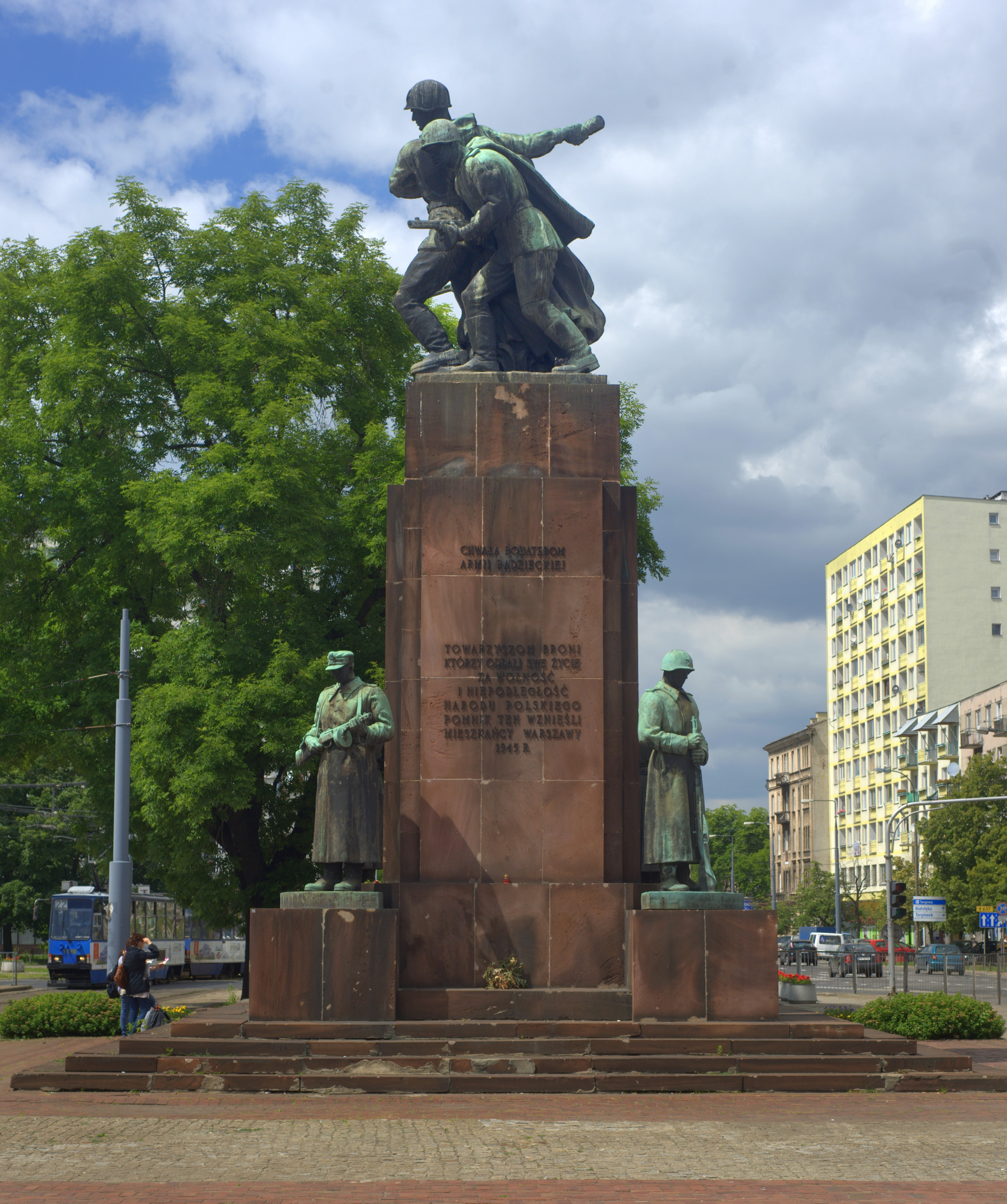
- The monument in 2010
- Location: Praga-Północ, Warsaw
- Designer: Warsaw Reconstruction Office
- Beginning date: 1945
- Opening date: 18 November 1945
- Restored date: 2011
- Dismantled date: 2012

The Monument to Brotherhood in Arms (Polish: Pomnik Braterstwa Broni) was erected in Vilnius Square in Warsaw's Praga district, in 1945, to commemorate the joint fight of Polish and Soviet soldiers against Nazi Germany. In 2011, it was temporarily taken down during the construction of an underground railway station and sent to restorers. However, when it was about to be reinstalled, a minority of Praga's residents objected, as they perceived the monument as a remnant of the Communist era. In surveys carried out by the city council and Gazeta Wyborcza in 2012 and 2013 respectively, the majority of Warsaw's residents said they would like the monument to be returned to its original place or placed somewhere nearby. In 2015, the Warsaw City Council overturned its earlier decision to return the monument and made the removal permanent.

The monument was colloquially known as 'the four sleepers' or 'the four mourners' (Polish: pomnik „czterech śpiących or „czterech smutnych”), in reference to the figures of two Polish and two Soviet soldiers with bowed heads at the four corners of the monument.
