= Praga-Północ =

Praga-North
- Warsaw District
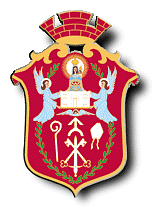
- Coat of arms

- Location of Praga-North within Warsaw
- Coordinates: 52°15′48″N 21°1′42″E
- Country: Poland
- Voivodeship: Masovian
- County/City: Warsaw

Government
  - Mayor: Ilona Soja Kozłowska

Area
  - Total: 11.42 km^{2} (4.41 sq mi)

Population (2019)
  - Total: 64,113
  - Density: 5,614/km^{2} (14,540/sq mi)
- Time zone: UTC+1 (CET)
  - Summer (DST): UTC+2 (CEST)
- Area code: +48 22
- Website: pragapn.um.warszawa.pl

Praga-North (Polish: Praga-Północ), also known as North Praga, Praga North, is a district of the city of Warsaw, Poland, located in the central part of the city.

== History ==
Praga is one of the oldest districts in Warsaw. Through the centuries, Warsaw's right-bank was an independent town. In 1648 it was granted municipal rights by the king Władysław IV Vasa. It was joined to Warsaw at the end of 18th century. In 1945 it was divided into Praga-North and Praga-South (Praga-Południe).

Praga North is a district that survived the devastation of war, with three different religions (Catholicism, Orthodoxy and Judaism) peacefully co-existing. A major part of the buildings in this area have preserved its historical origins which makes it one of the best-preserved area of old buildings in the capital. In the district there are many streets which remained undamaged in WW II. Pre-war lamp-posts, sidewalks and blocks are notable features of the area.

At present, Praga North has an area of 11.42 km^{2} (4.41 sq mi), and 64,904 inhabitants (2018). The district is becoming increasingly popular among artists and tourists.

== Tourist attractions ==
Praga is one of few districts where you can experience the atmosphere of pre-war Warsaw.

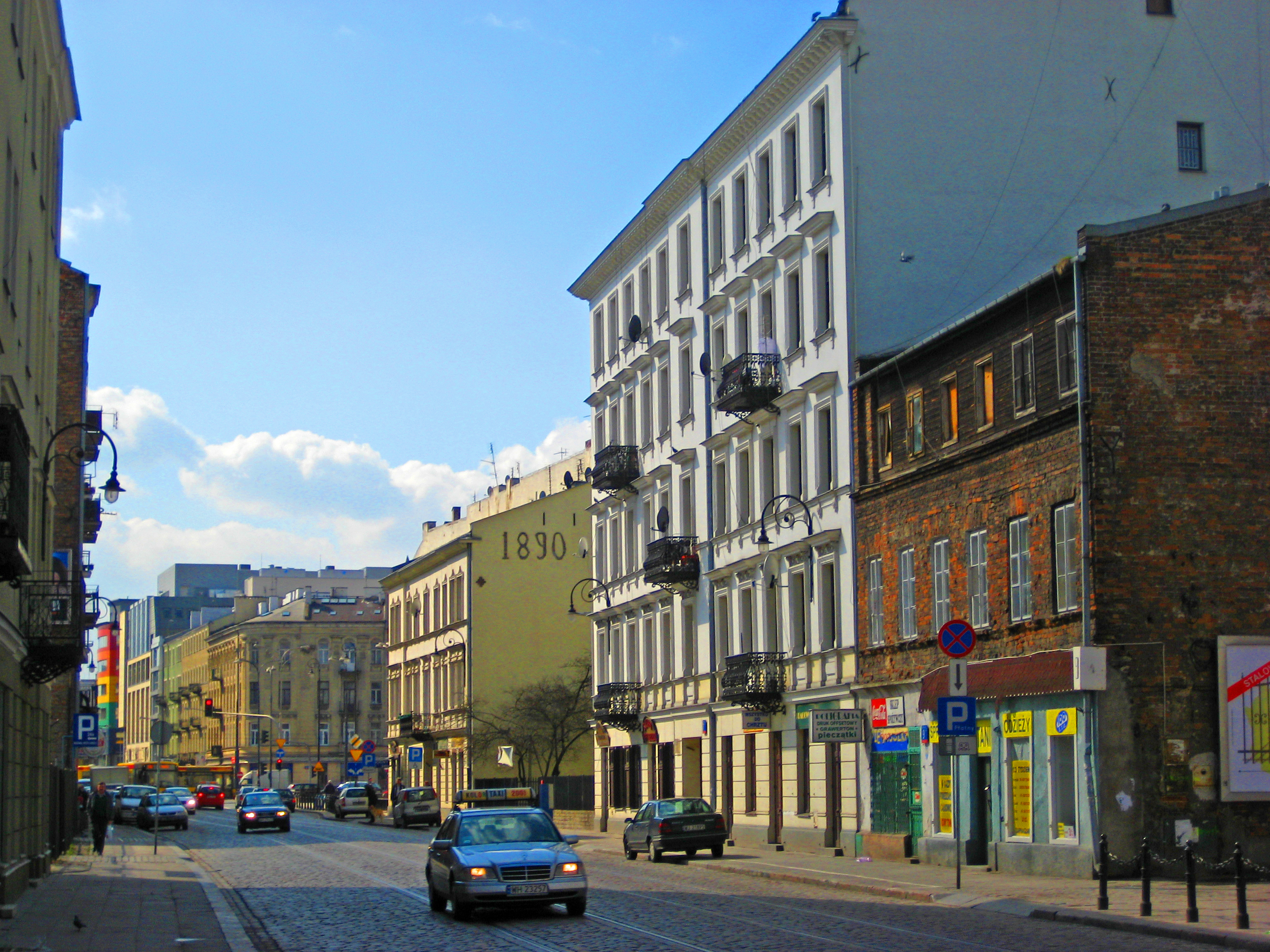
Ząbkowska street

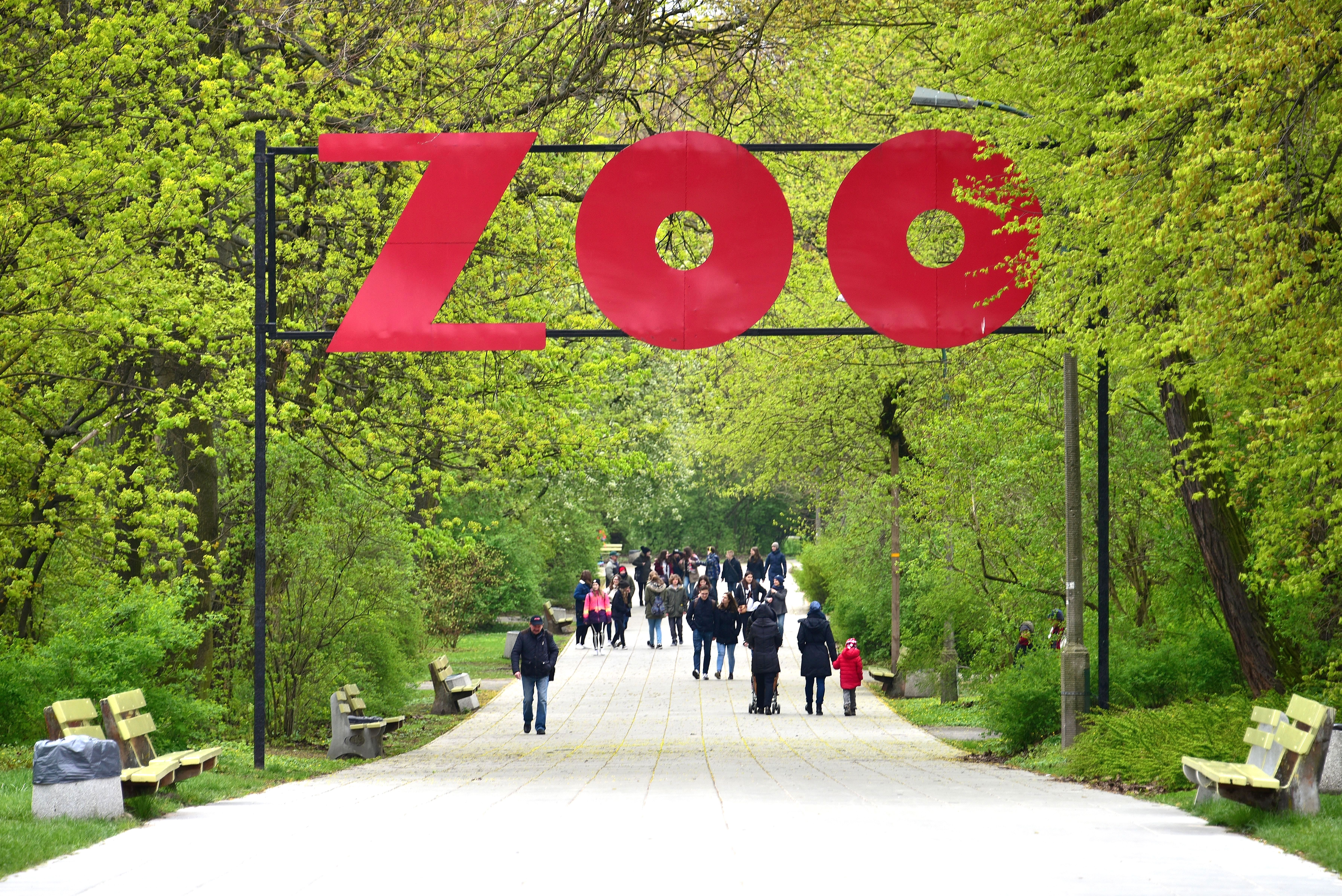
Warsaw Zoo

- Zoological Garden

It was opened in 1928, in the northern part of Park Praski. It was destroyed during World War II and then restored and reopened in 1948. At present, the Zoological Garden has more than 5,000 animals representing nearly 500 species. One of the biggest attractions of the zoo are brown bears, whose enclosure is located outside the zoo walls and can be viewed by passers-by.

- Beach on the Vistula

One of the three beaches in Warsaw is situated on the Warsaw's right bank. It is only opened during summer and is several hundreds of meters long. It attracts hundreds of visitors due to its lawn chairs, wicker baskets, volleyball and badminton fields. In the evening concerts and DJs are featured. Right from the beach visitors can admire the view of the Old Town. Two other beaches on the Vistula River are located on the Cypel Czerniakowski and Wał Miedzeszyński Street.

- Monument of Praga's Backyard Orchestra

The monument presents a neighbourhood band and plays popular old Warsaw tunes. In the band are a violinist, accordion player, guitarist, banjo player, and a drummer. It was revealed in 2006 and is surrounded by a small square.

- Różycki Bazaar

It was founded in the end of 19th century by Julian Różycki, a wealthy pharmacist. For many years it served as a major trading centre in the area.

- Rothblith House Targowa street

Three houses that were built at the entrance to the Rożycki Bazaar. Two of them are the oldest buildings preserved in Praga District. They were built for a Jewish merchant Berek Rothblith. In the beginning of the 19th century, the houses were used as Jewish houses of prayer. Today, the buildings belong to the Museum of Praga.

- Cathedral of St. Mary Magdalene

Metropolitan Orthodox St. Mary Magdalene Church was opened in 1869. The building is inspired by Byzantine architecture. It is one of the biggest Polish Orthodox Churches.

== Neighbourhoods within the district ==
- Old Praga
- New Praga
- Szmulowizna
- Pelcowizna
