= Jewish house of prayer in Warsaw =

Former Jewish house of prayer in Poland

Jewish house of prayer
- Żydowski dom modlitwy (Polish)
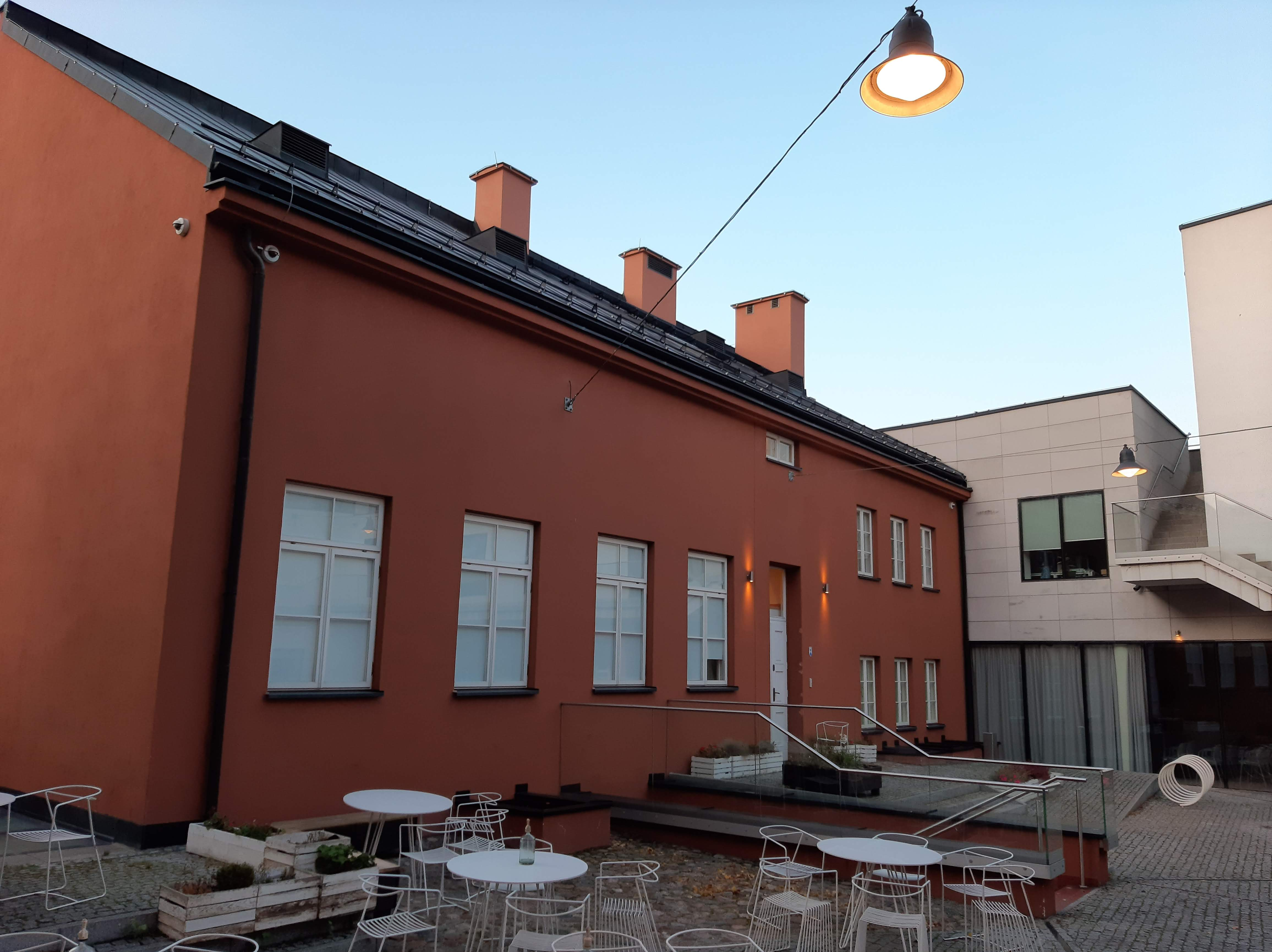

Religion
- Affiliation: Judaism
- Ecclesiastical or organizational status: Inactive

Location
- Location: 50/52 Targowa Street; Warsaw, Poland
- Coordinates: 52°15′07″N 21°02′20″E

Architecture
- Established: Second half of the 19th century
- Materials: Brick

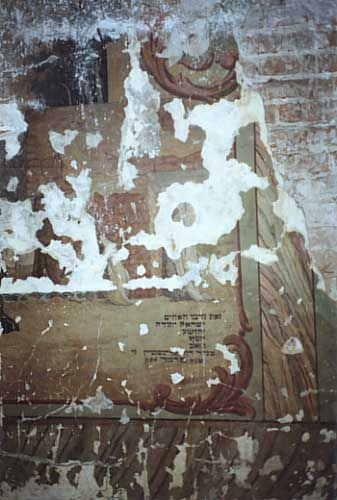
Western Wall

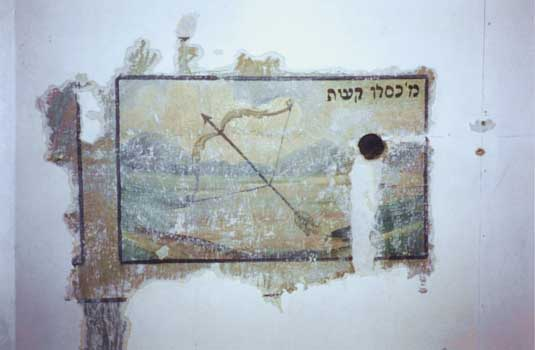
Sagittarius

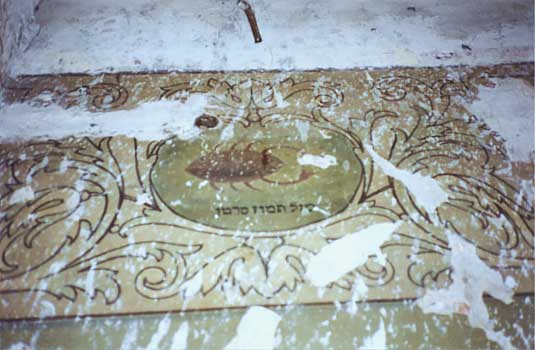
Scorpio

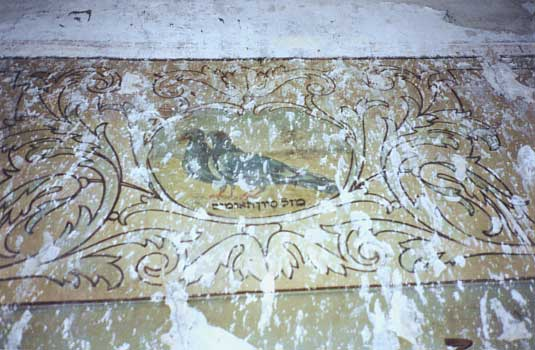
Gemini

The Jewish house of prayer is a former Jewish house of prayer located in Warsaw, in the outbuilding of the tenements at 50/52 Targowa Street, which house the Museum of Praga. Its interior contains one of the two preserved synagogue wall paintings in Mazovia.

== History ==
The building was constructed in the second half of the 19th century as an outbuilding of the Rothblit and Sokołowski tenements. In 1934, new wall paintings were created inside. The fate of the prayer house during World War II is unknown, but it is presumed that its interior furnishings were vandalized.

After the war, the interior of the former prayer house was used as warehouses and a garage, with some of the wall paintings covered over with paint. For many years, the building's original purpose was unknown. In March 1996, Warsaw historians Janusz Sujecki from the Cultural Heritage Guardians of Warsaw and Jarosław Zieliński from the Society for the Protection of Monuments stumbled upon fragments of wall paintings by chance. The discovery was considered remarkable, as these were the only authentic synagogue wall paintings found in Mazovia at that time.

A prolonged effort was made to evict a tenant who had converted the former prayer house into a garage. The district administration managing the property eventually removed the tenant. For many years, there was no plan for repurposing the prayer house, and the condition of the wall paintings deteriorated annually in the unheated, empty rooms. In November 1999, wall paintings of similar content were discovered under a layer of white paint in an adjacent room of the outbuilding. It is believed that this room may have been a babinets or even a separate prayer house.

In 2001, the complex of buildings at 50 Targowa Street, including the outbuilding, was listed in the Registry of Cultural Property by the Voivodeship Monument Conservator (no. 6-A of 19 January 2001). On 18 January 2002, the prayer house premises were leased by the Warsaw-Centrum municipality to the Gęsia Jewish Cemetery Foundation, which focuses on preserving Jewish monuments in Poland.

After the opening of the Museum of Praga, the rooms of the former prayer house became part of its permanent exhibition.

== Architecture ==
The interior retains remnants of original wall paintings and Hebrew inscriptions with a chronogram of 5694, corresponding to 1934. These depict, among others, the tomb of Rachel in Bethlehem, an incomplete zodiac cycle, and Jews praying at the Western Wall in Jerusalem. The latter bears the inscription: "This was funded by the brothers: Yisrael Yehuda, Yehoshua, Josef, and Ze'ev, sons of Mr. David Grinsztejn, may his light shine upon us. Year 694 according to the short reckoning". Due to significant dampness in the building, the condition of the paintings is very poor.

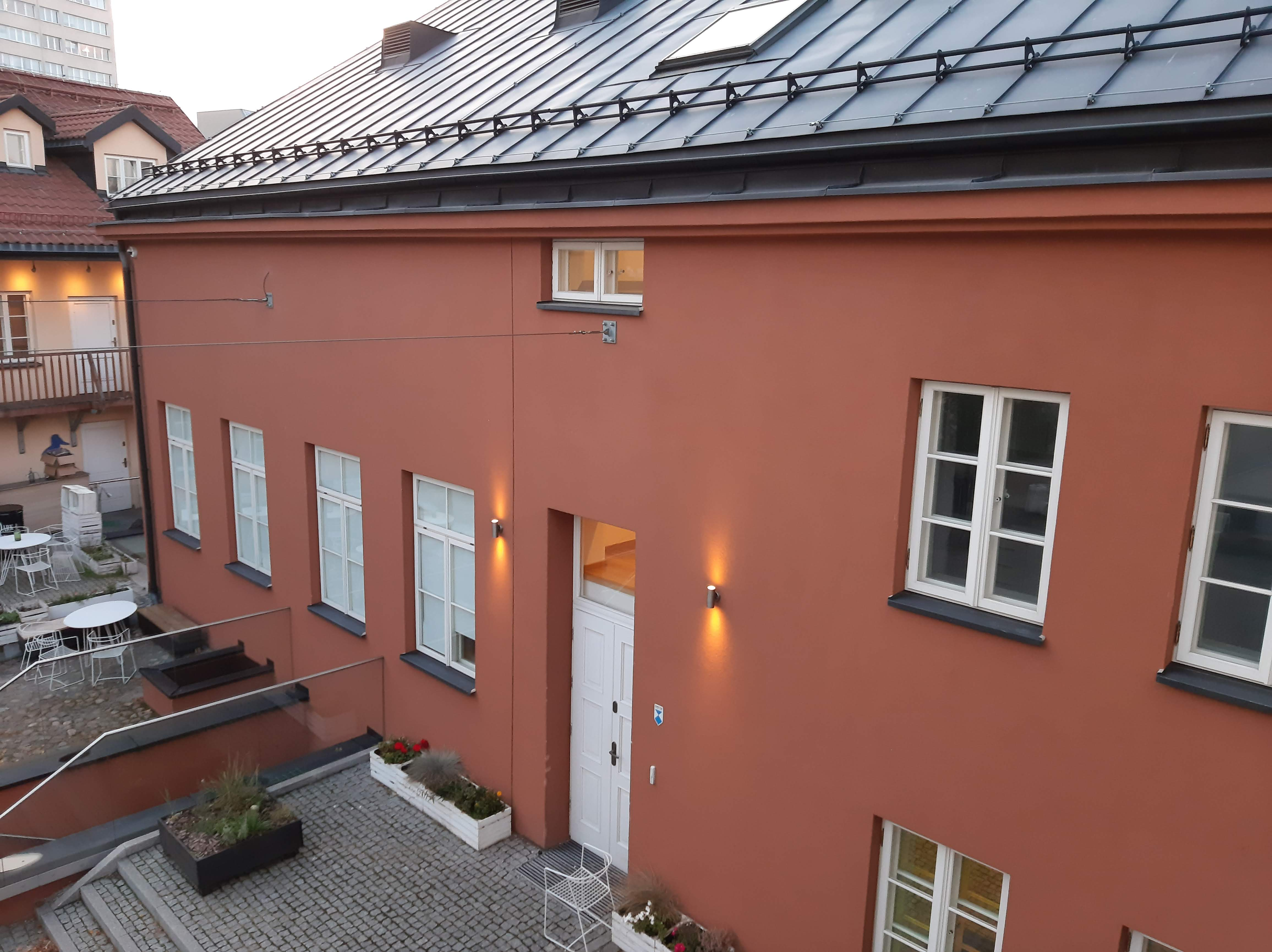

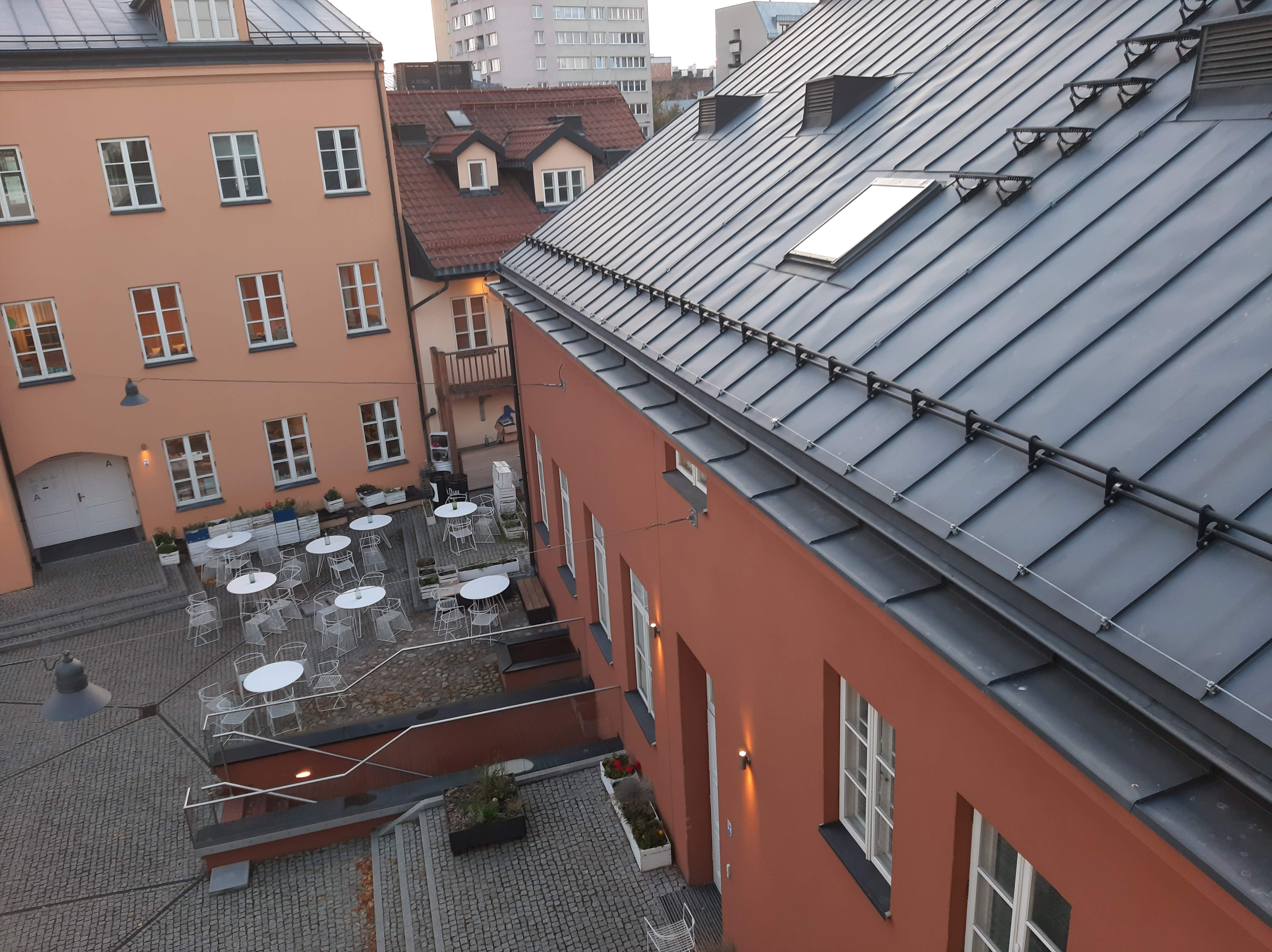

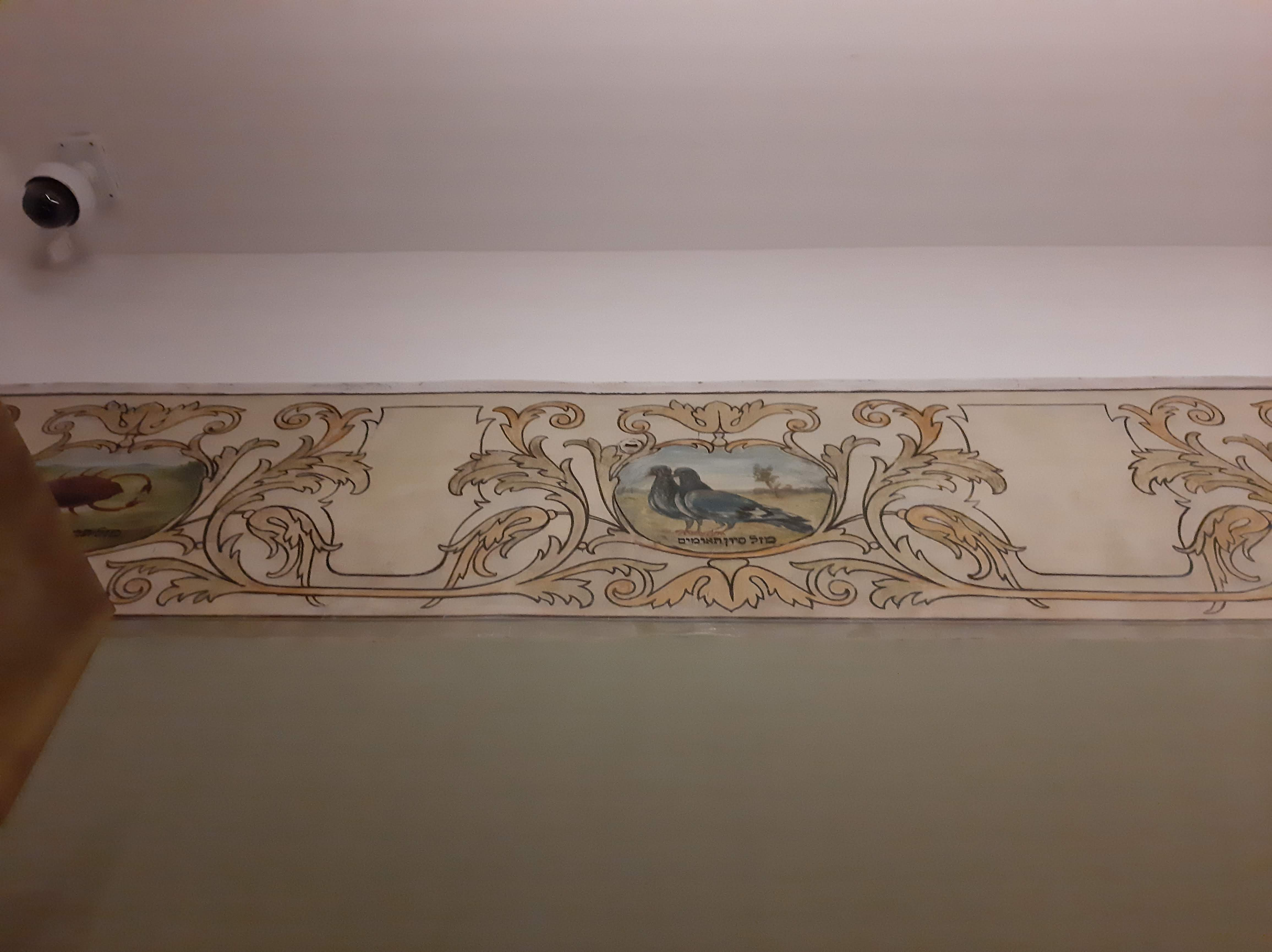

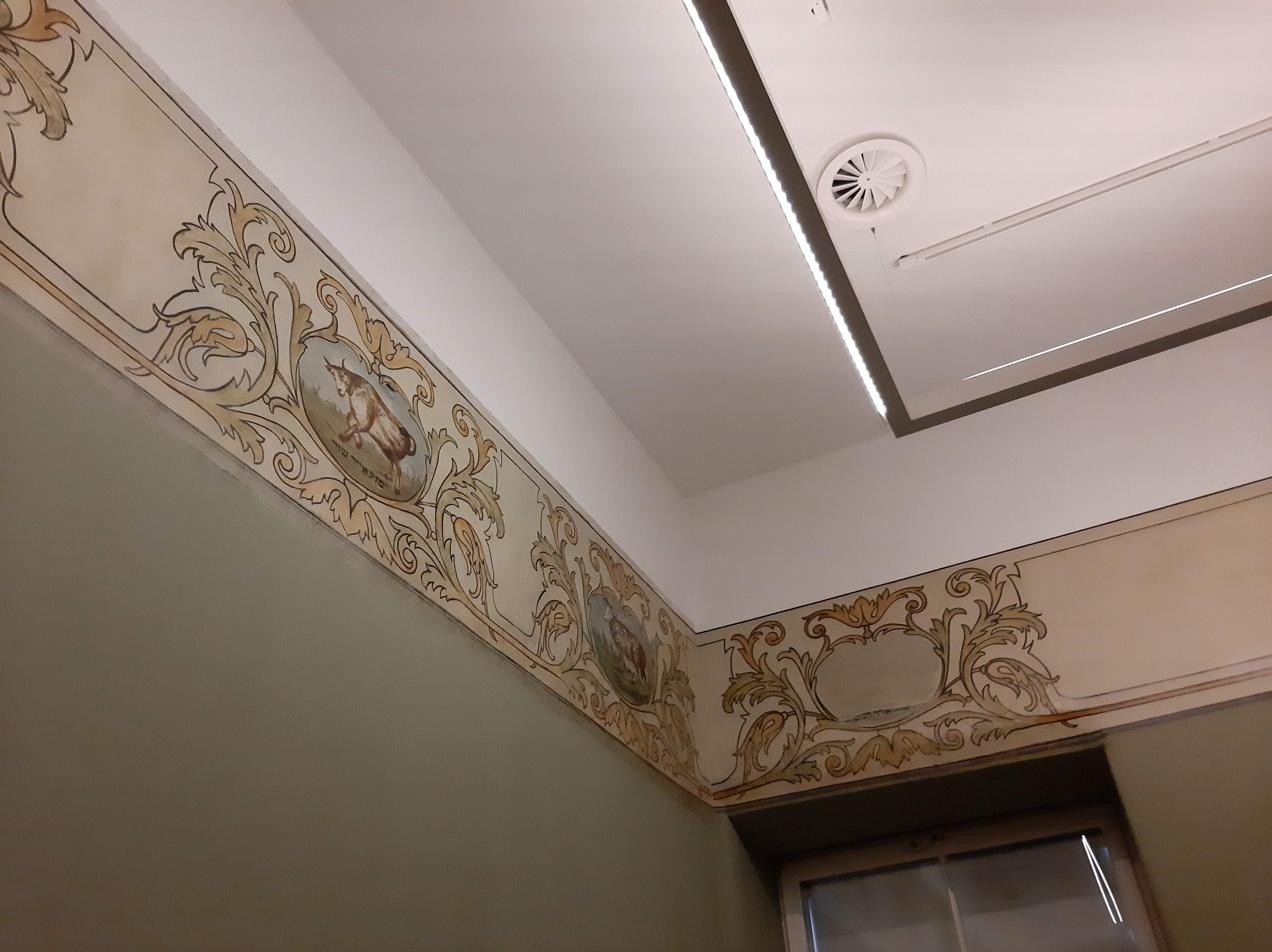

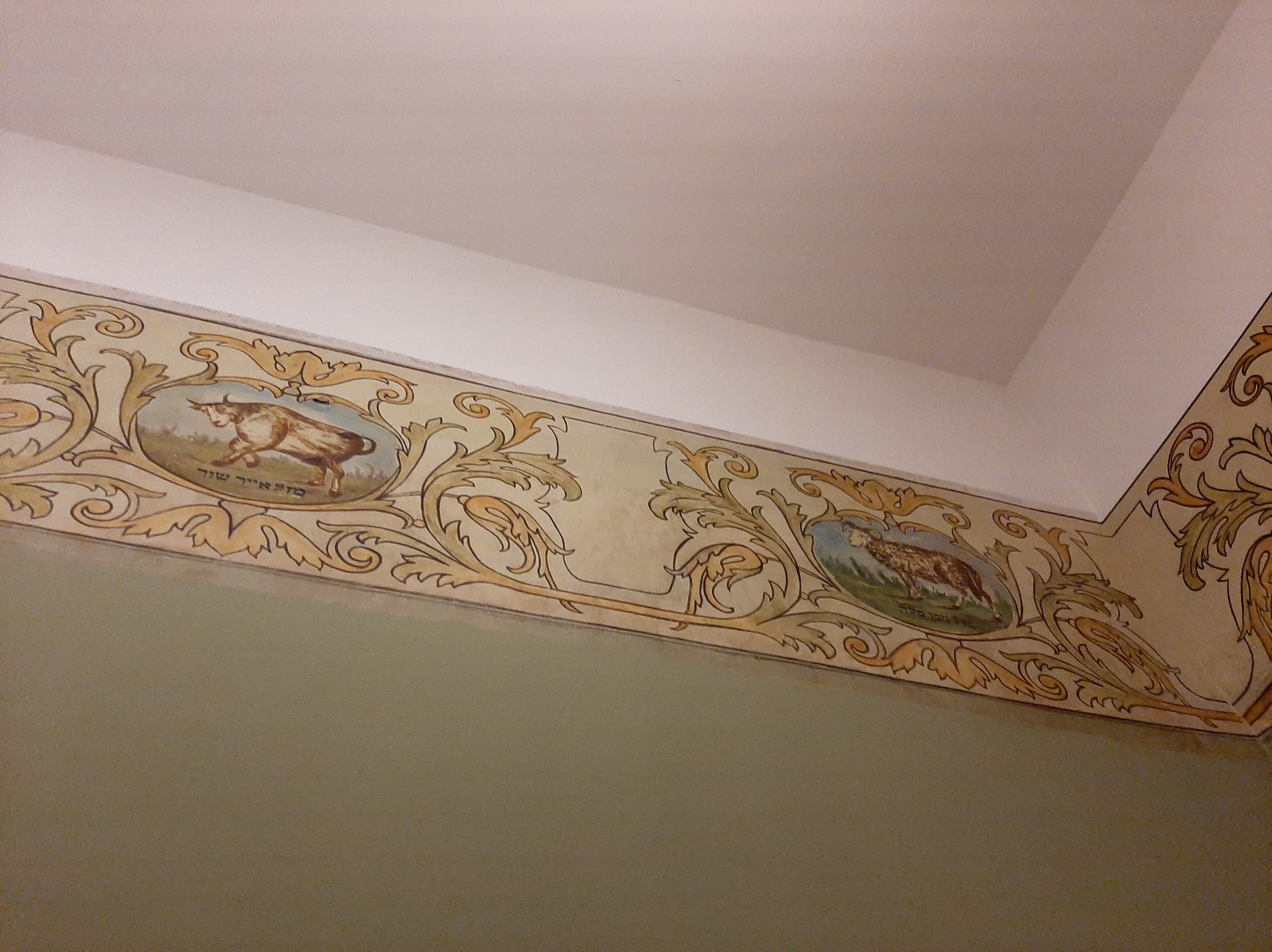

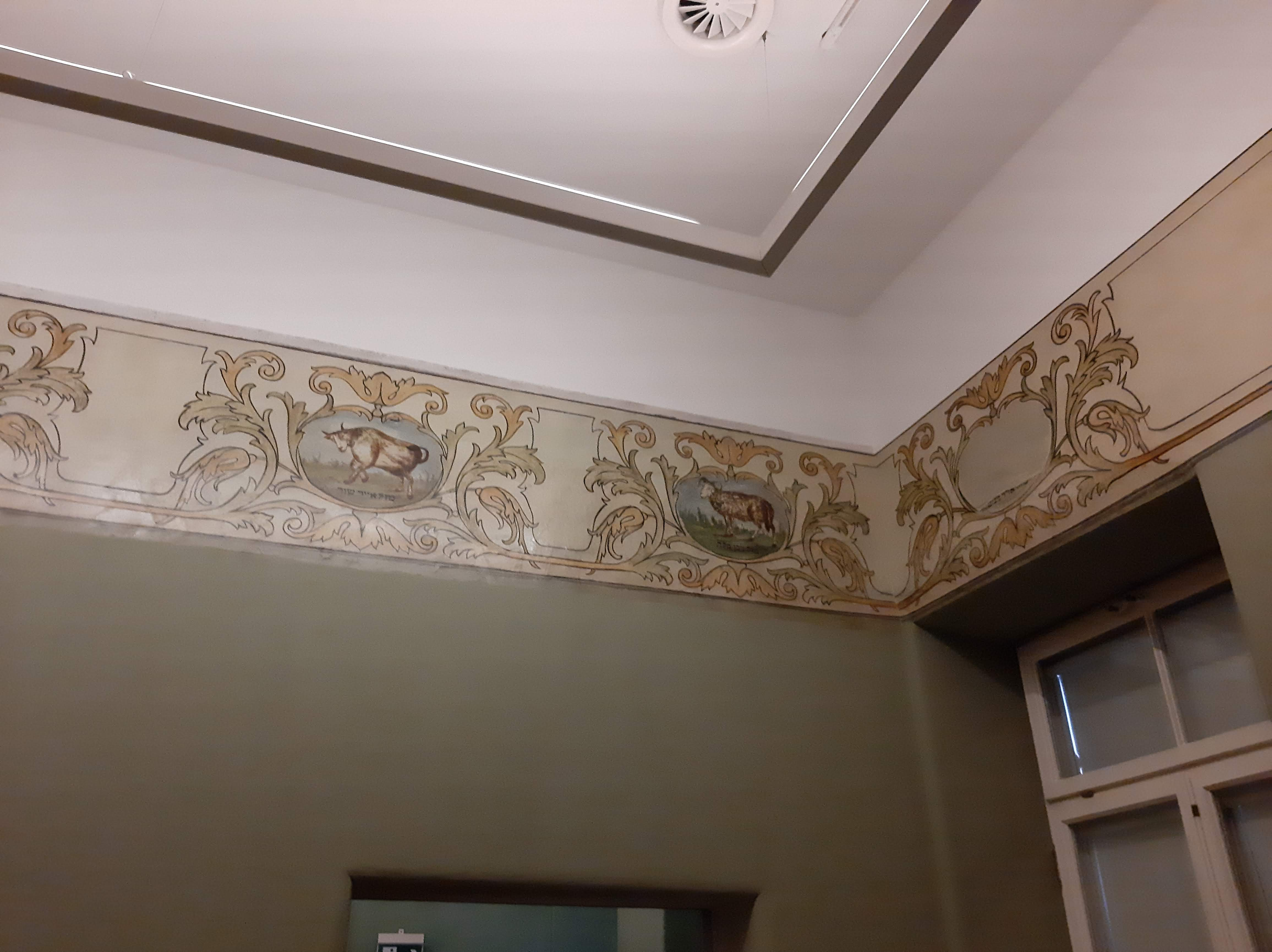

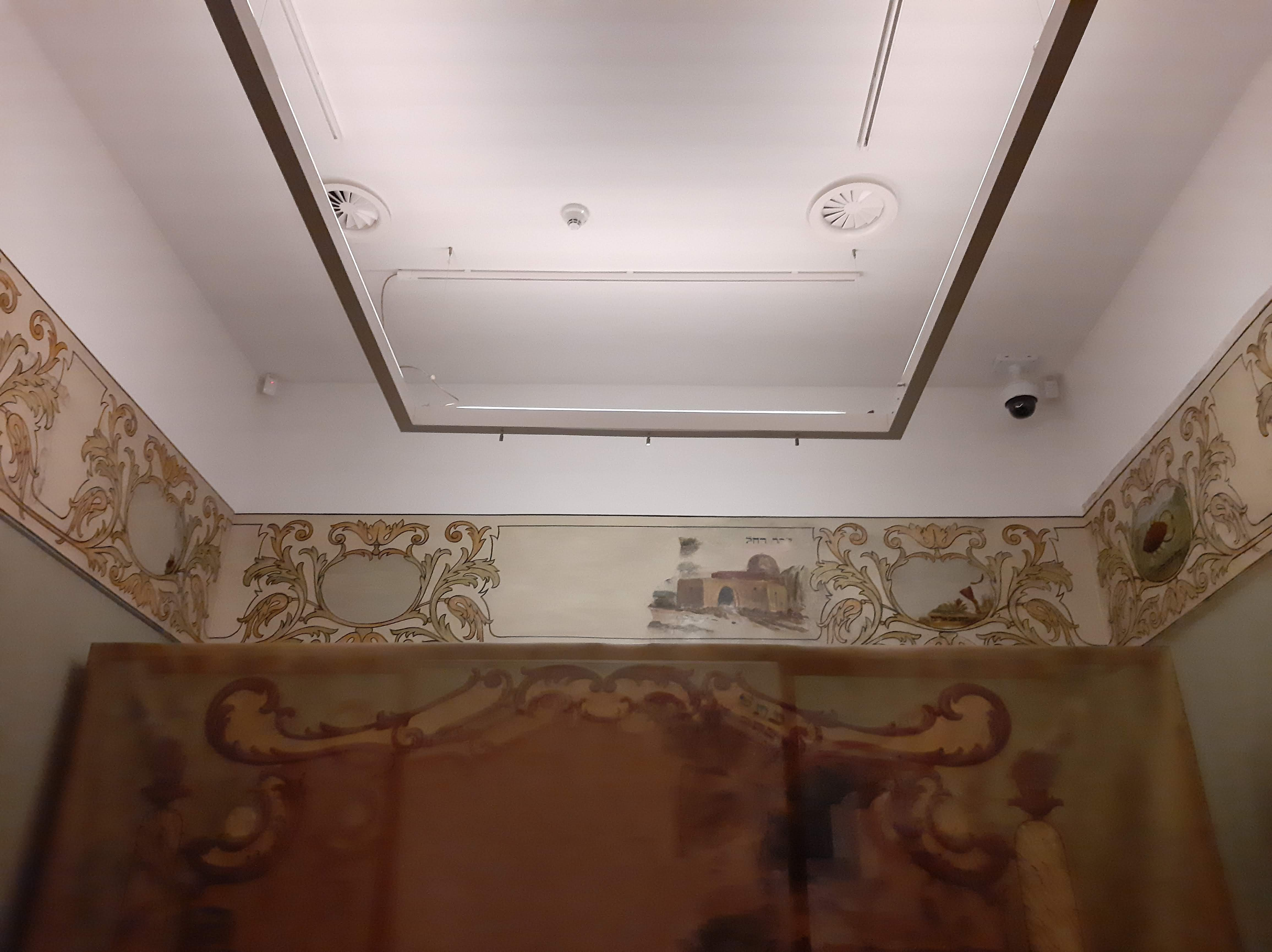

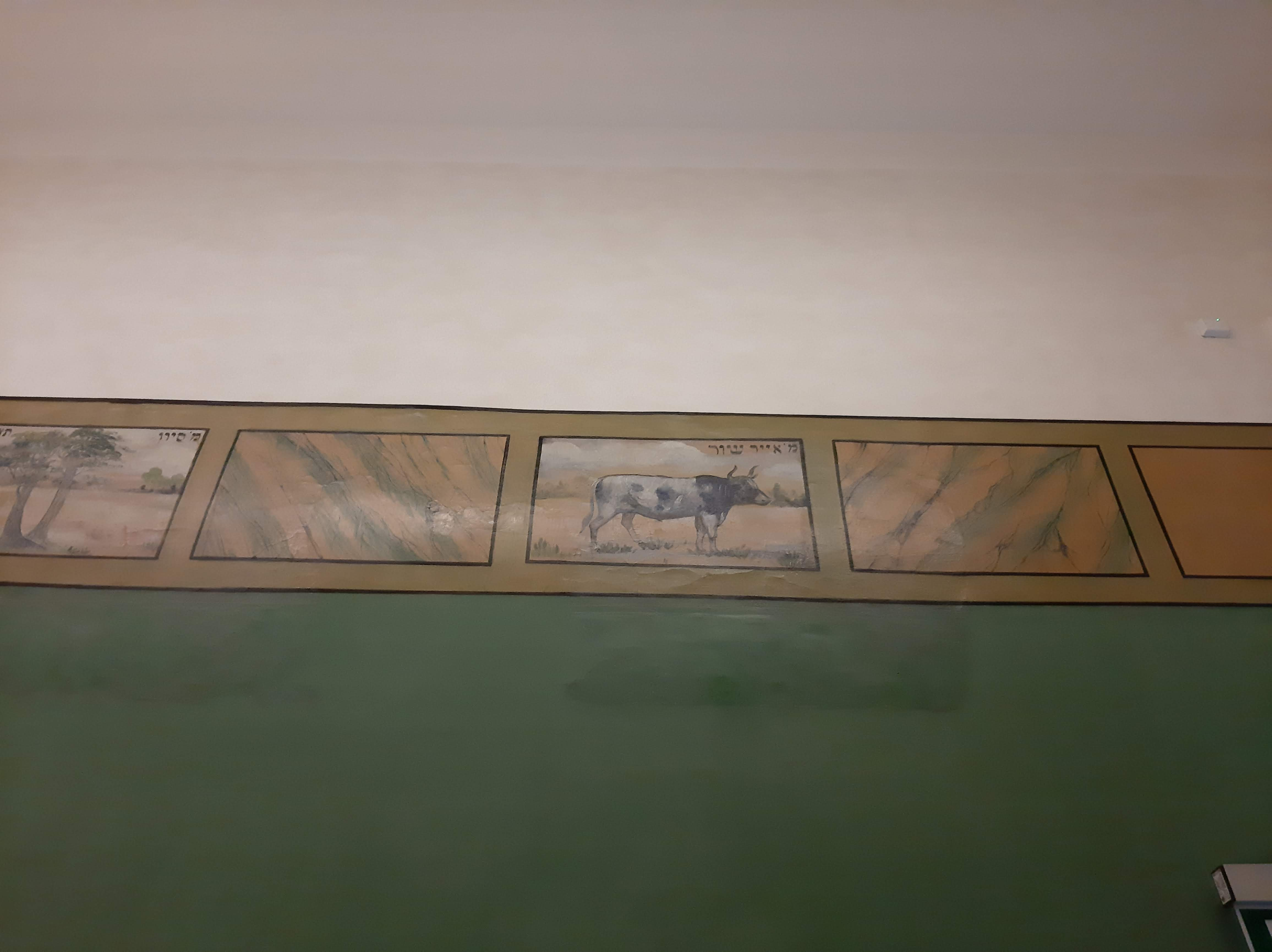

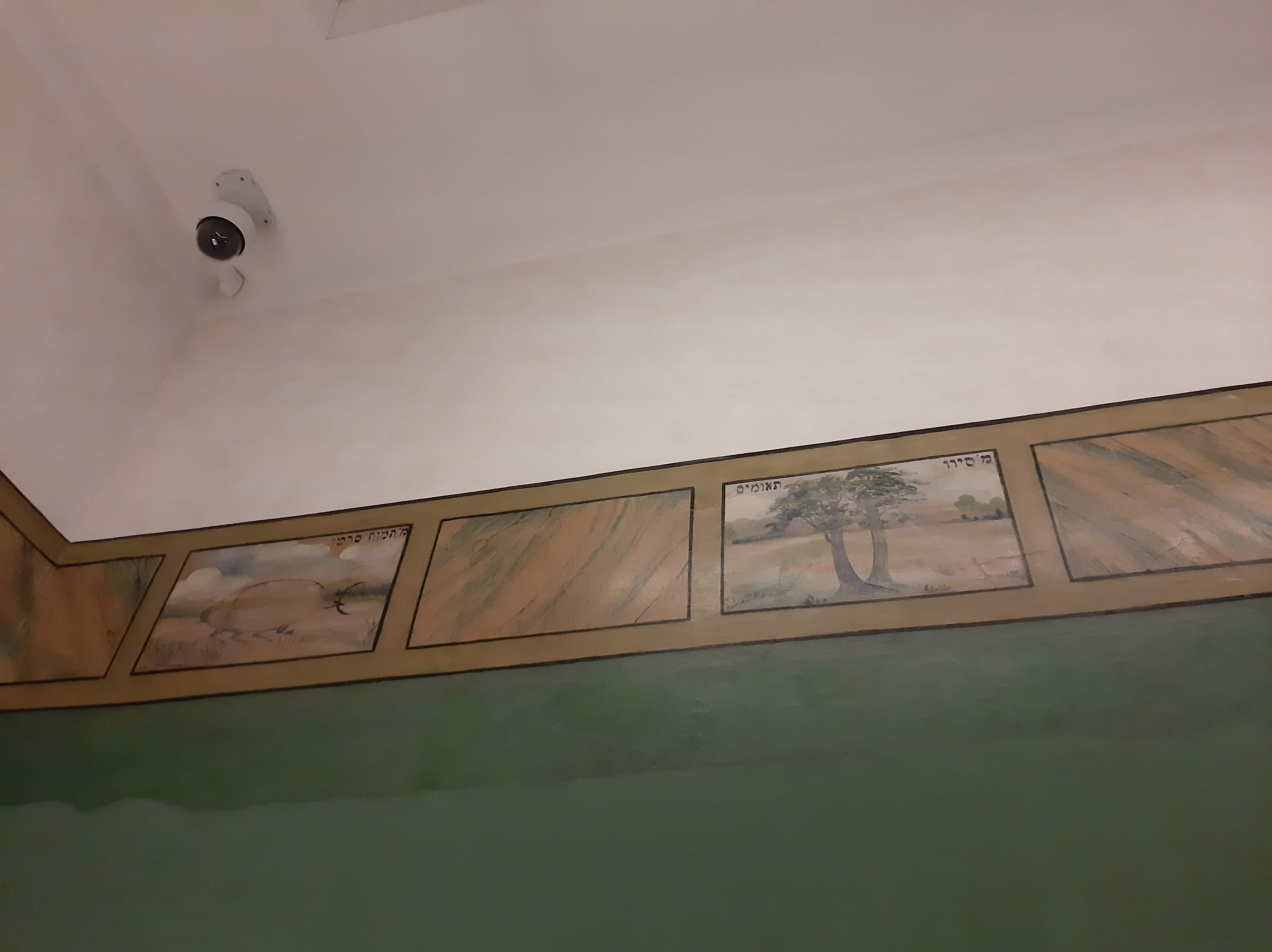

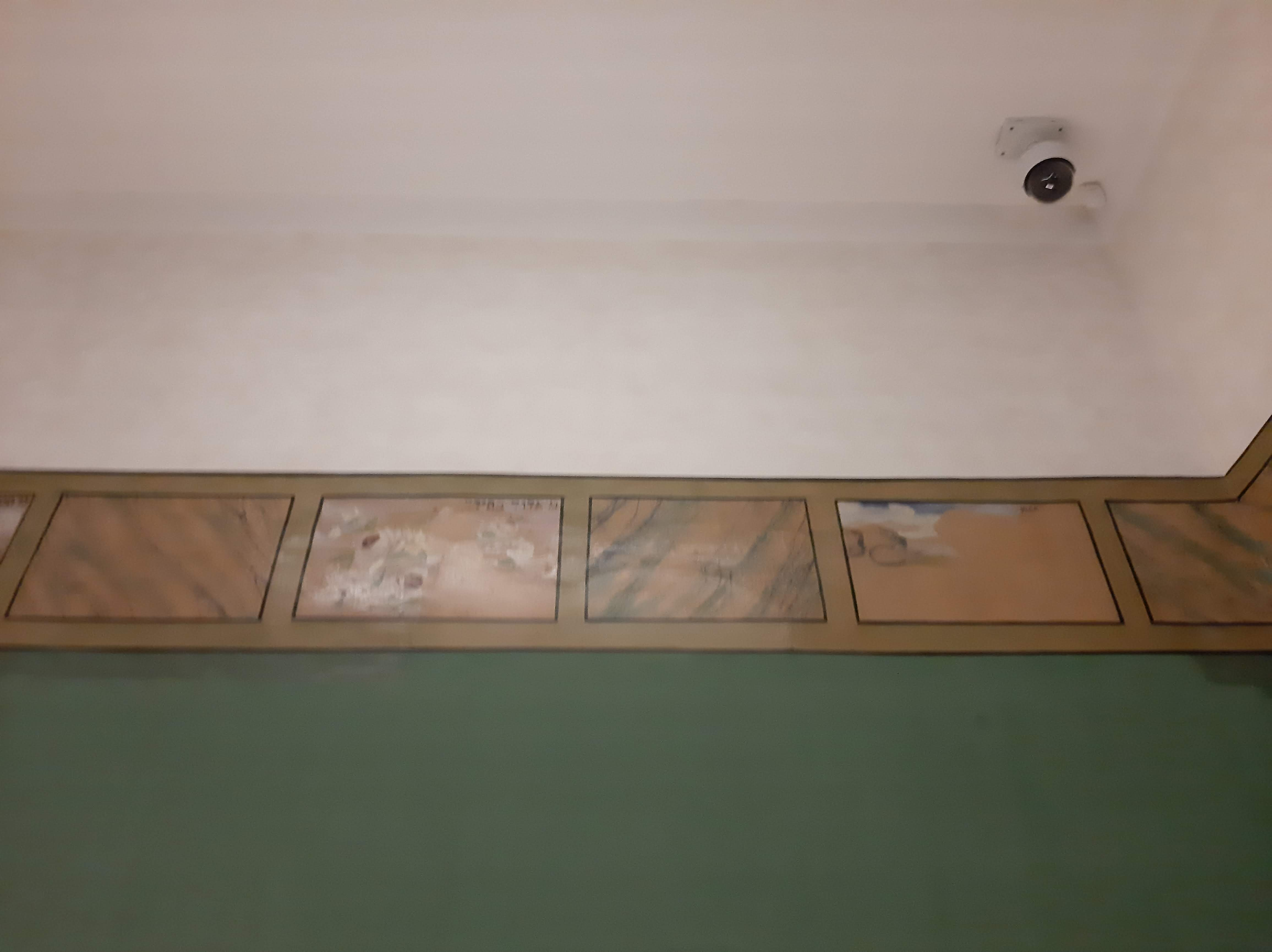

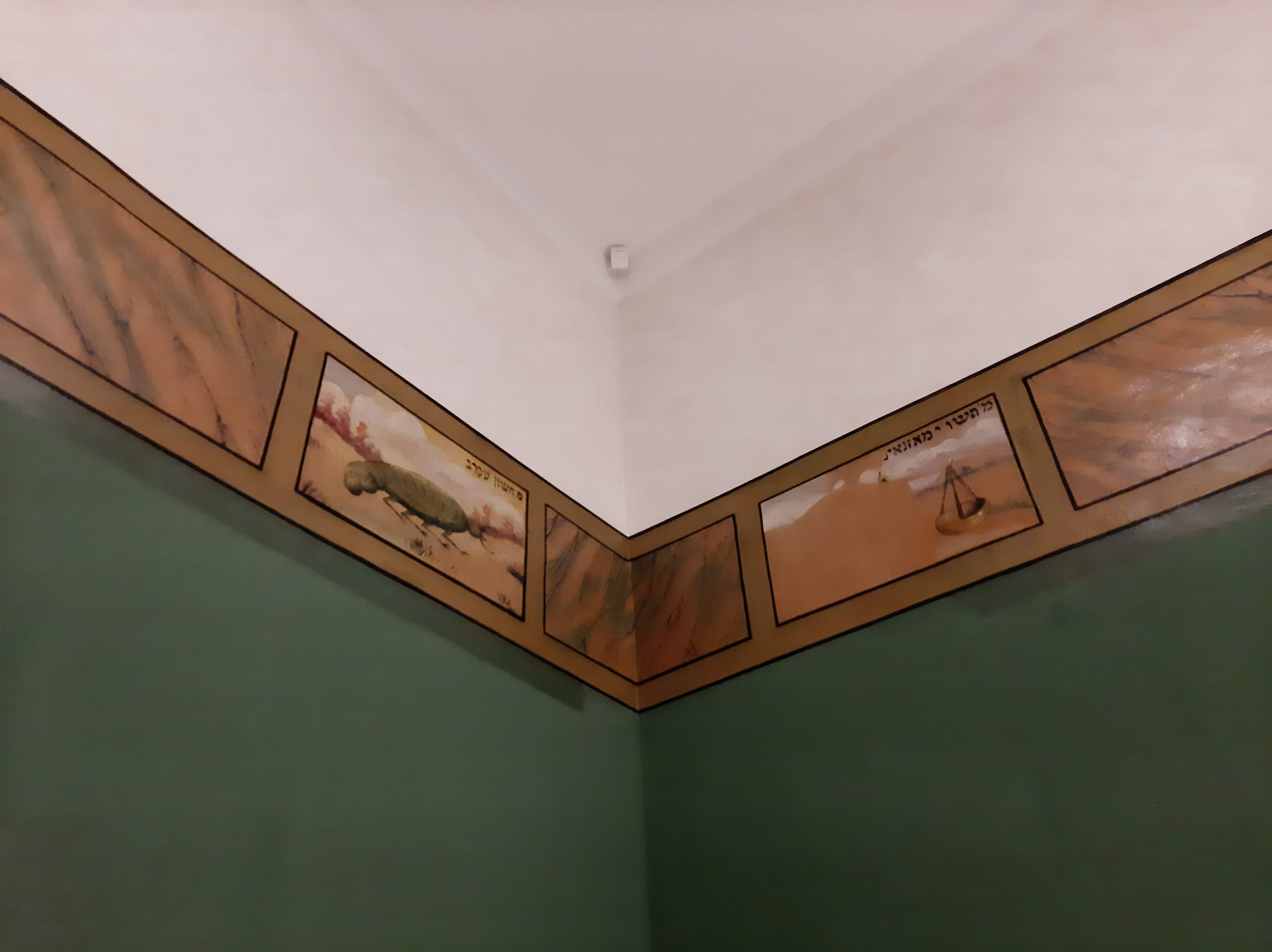

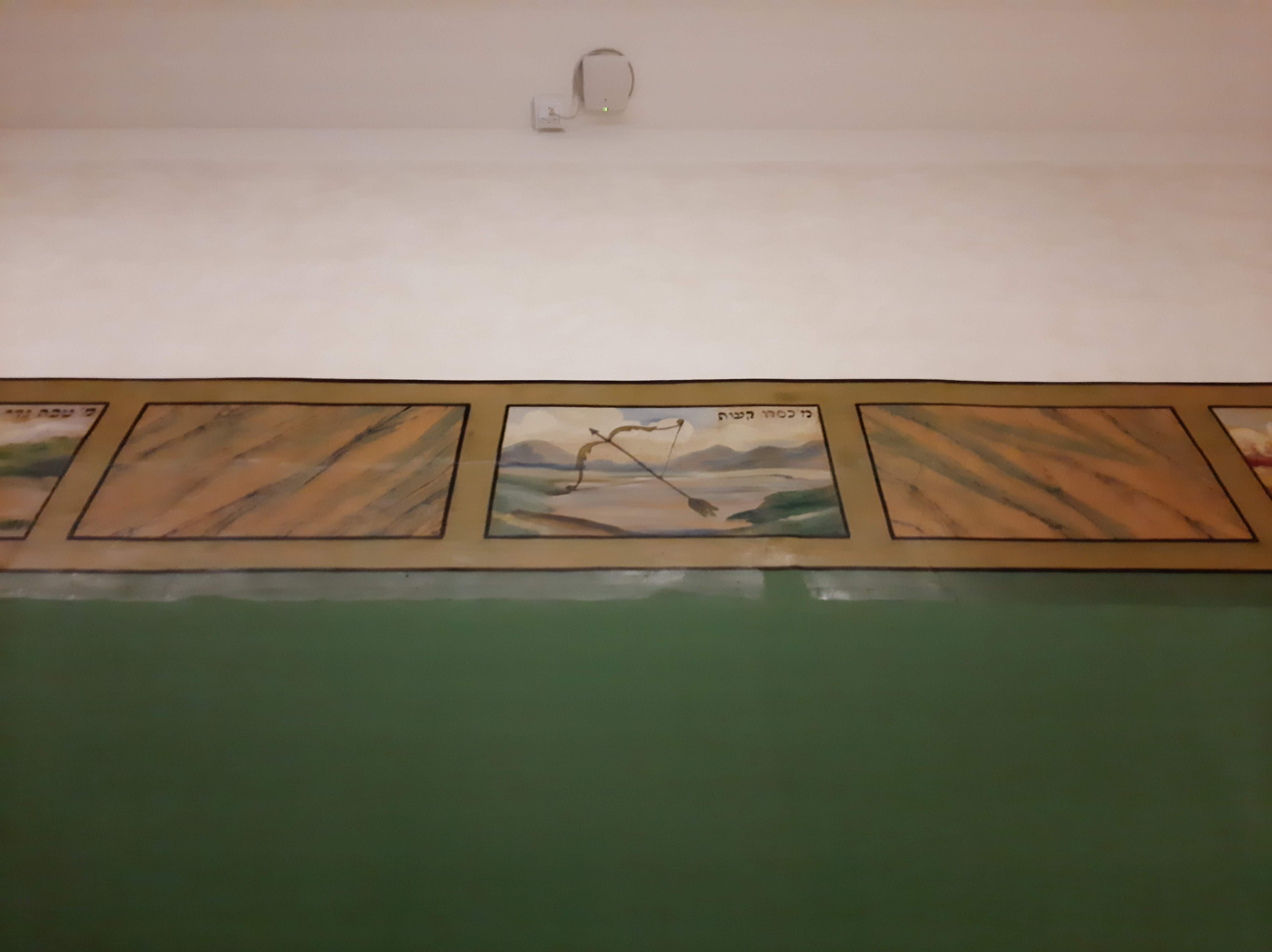

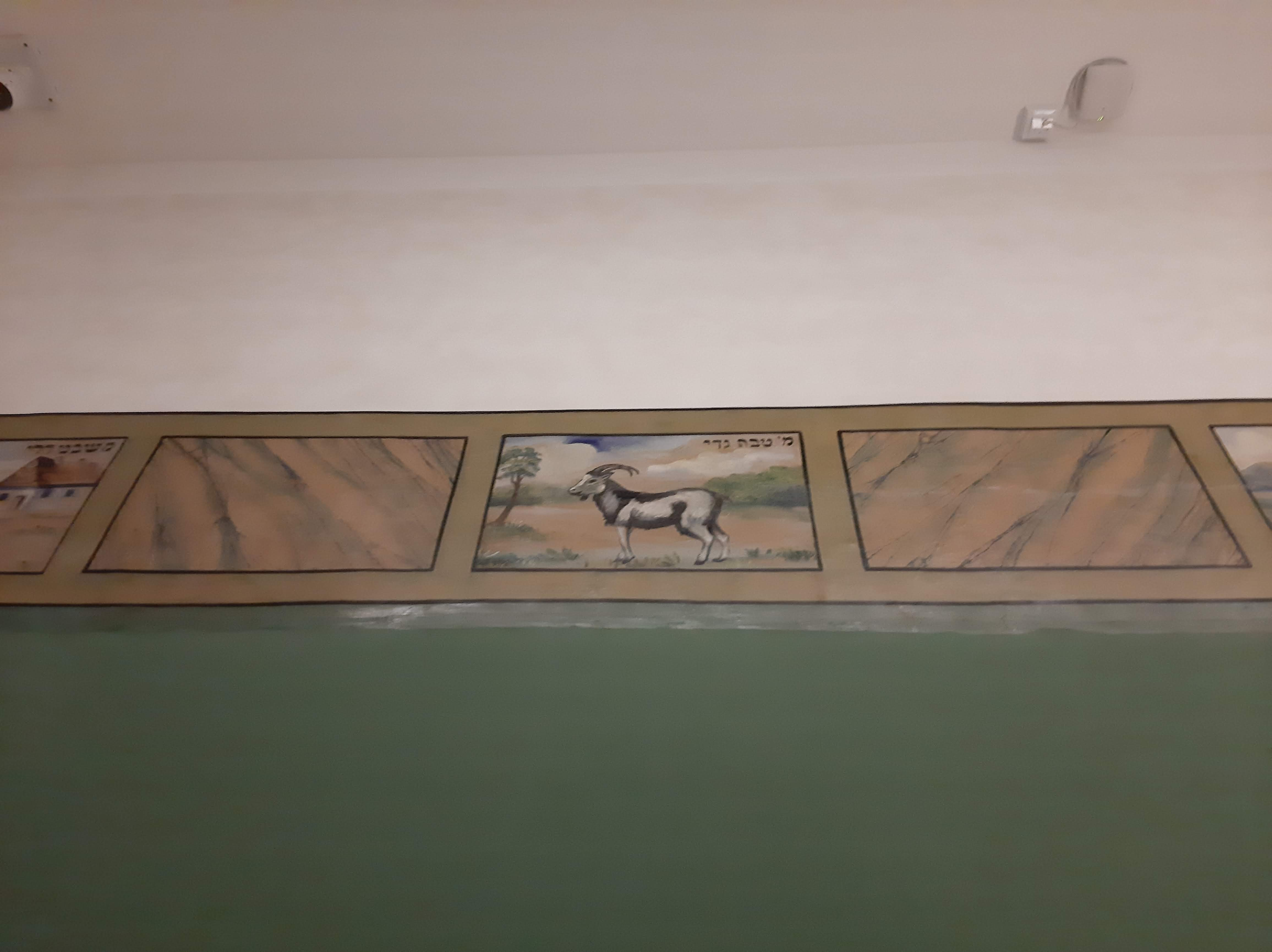

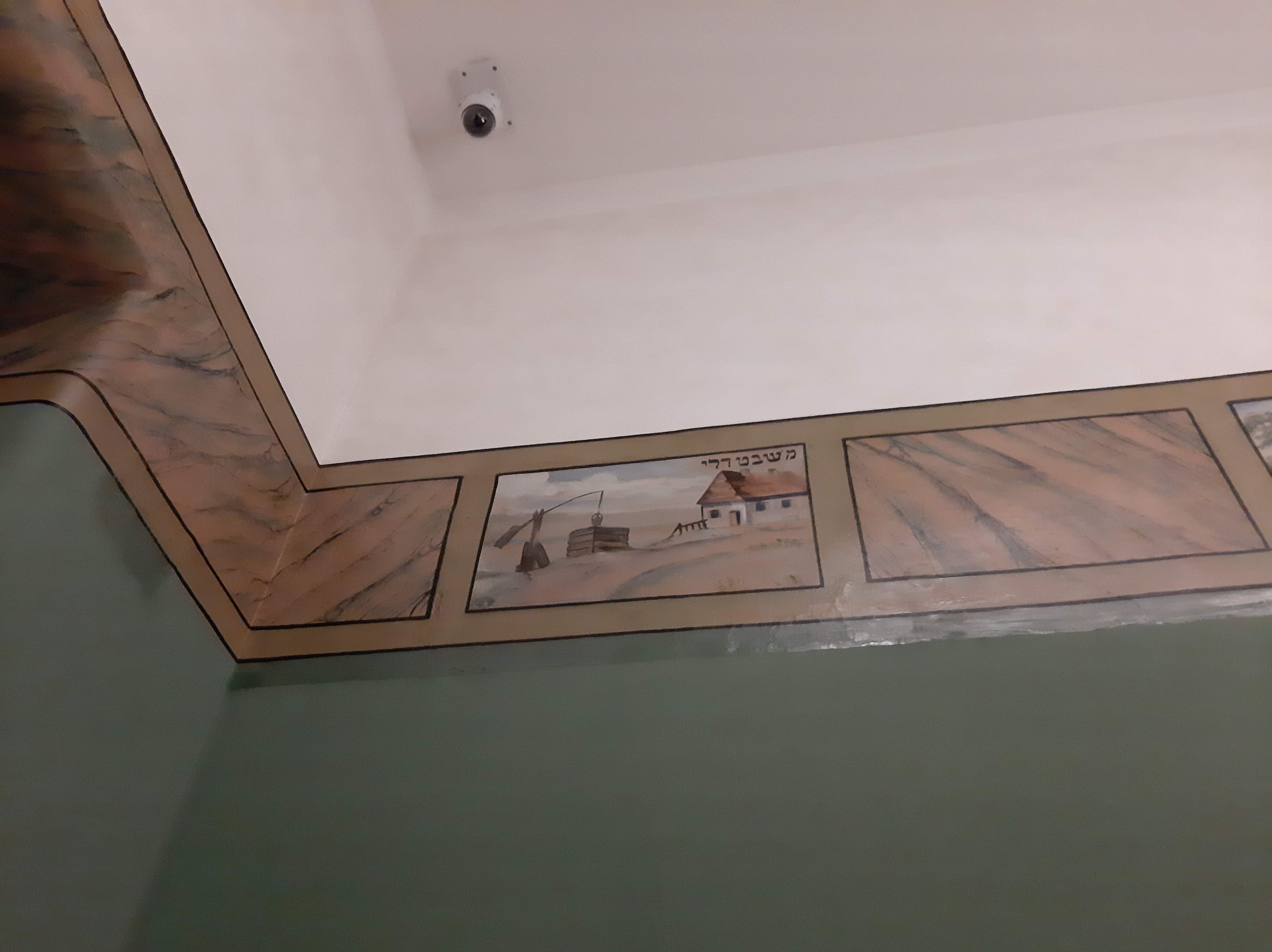
