= Museum of Praga =

Coordinates: 52°15′14″N 21°2′30″E

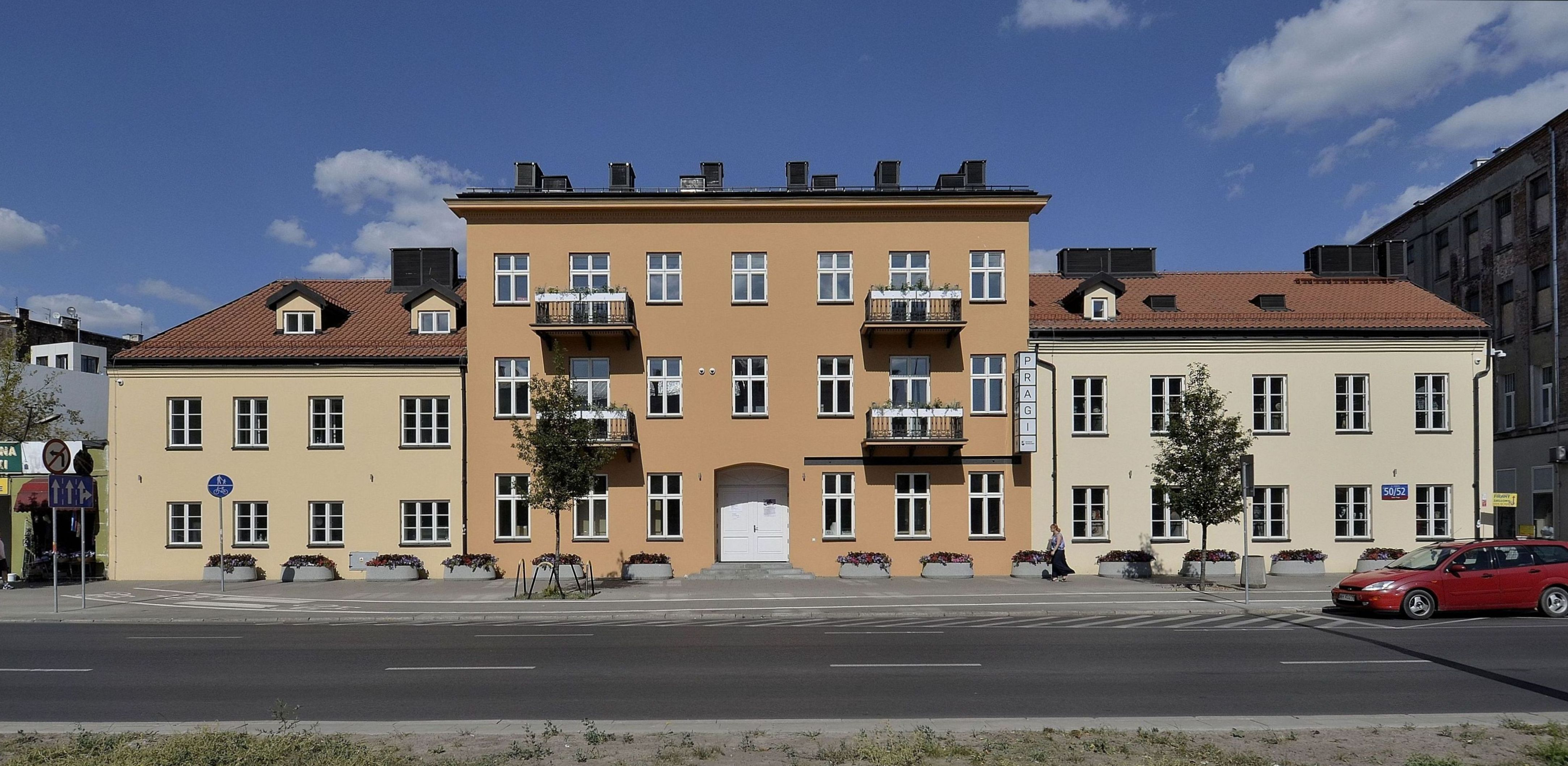
- Established: 2007
- Location: Targowa 50/52; Warsaw, Poland
- Type: local museum
- Public transit access: Dworzec Wilenski
- Website: muzeumpragi.pl

Muzeum Warszawskiej Pragi is a museum in Warsaw, Poland. It was established in 2006. It is located in historic buildings at Targowa 50/52, one of which, Krzyżanowski's House, is the oldest brick-built house in the Praga suburb, dating back to the 18th century.

The museum is a branch of the Museum of Warsaw. Exhibits include a model of Praga in the 18th century, historic photographs and artefacts donated by local residents.

== History ==
The need to establish the Praga Museum and preserve its vanishing heritage had been discussed for a long time. Various ideas were proposed for the museum’s final location—it was initially planned to be housed in Ksawery Konopacki’s palace at 11/13 Strzelecka Street in Nowa Praga or in the Warszawska Wytwórnia Wódek Koneser (Warsaw Vodka Factory) on Ząbkowska Street. Ultimately, it was decided that the museum would be located in a complex of three historic tenement houses at 50/52 Targowa Street, next to the Różycki Bazaar. One of these buildings, the Rothblith House, is the oldest surviving brick residential building in Praga. In 1996, fragments of wall paintings were discovered in its annex, which had adorned a Jewish prayer house before the war. These unique polychromes depict the signs of the Zodiac, Jews praying at the Wailing Wall, and Rachel’s Tomb in Bethlehem. They are believed to be the only paintings of this kind preserved in the Mazovia region.

The museum was established in 2007. Initially, its temporary headquarters were at 45 Targowa Street and later at 23/25 Ząbkowska Street. There, a collection of Praga memorabilia was gathered, including photographs, everyday objects, clothing, toys, furniture, and recorded testimonies from Praga residents ("Oral History Archive"). The museum organized temporary exhibitions at the Warszawska Wytwórnia Wódek "Koneser" and participated in events such as the Night of Museums and Praga Cultural Meetings.

The Praga Museum was initially scheduled to open in 2010. However, due to budget cuts, the construction contract with Mostostal was not signed until June 2010, leading to multiple delays and pushing the opening back to 2011, then 2012, 2013, and finally 2014. The project turned out to be far more complex and approximately 12 percent more expensive than initially anticipated. The condition of the tenement houses was worse than expected, and during construction, 18th-century cellars were discovered nearby, necessitating design changes and additional work.

Only the outer walls of the tenement houses were preserved, with metal structures and floors supported by internal columns. The three buildings were connected, but their different floor levels were maintained. The museum features exhibitions, an interactive education and oral history room, and a café. It also includes the preserved prayer house and a new building with a screening room.

In 2013, a model of 18th-century Praga was created. Three times, in 2012 and 2013, competitions were announced to develop the artistic and spatial concept of the museum’s permanent exhibition, with the final decision made in December 2013. The winning project sparked controversy—while praised for its innovative and fresh design, it was also criticized for reinforcing stereotypes, presenting the Praga community and folklore in a schematic manner, focusing on social pathologies, and even showing ignorance regarding the history of this part of Warsaw.

The museum, with its permanent exhibition, officially opened to visitors on September 19, 2015.
