= Praga Park =

Park in Warsaw, Poland

Coordinates: 52°15′13″N 21°01′38″E

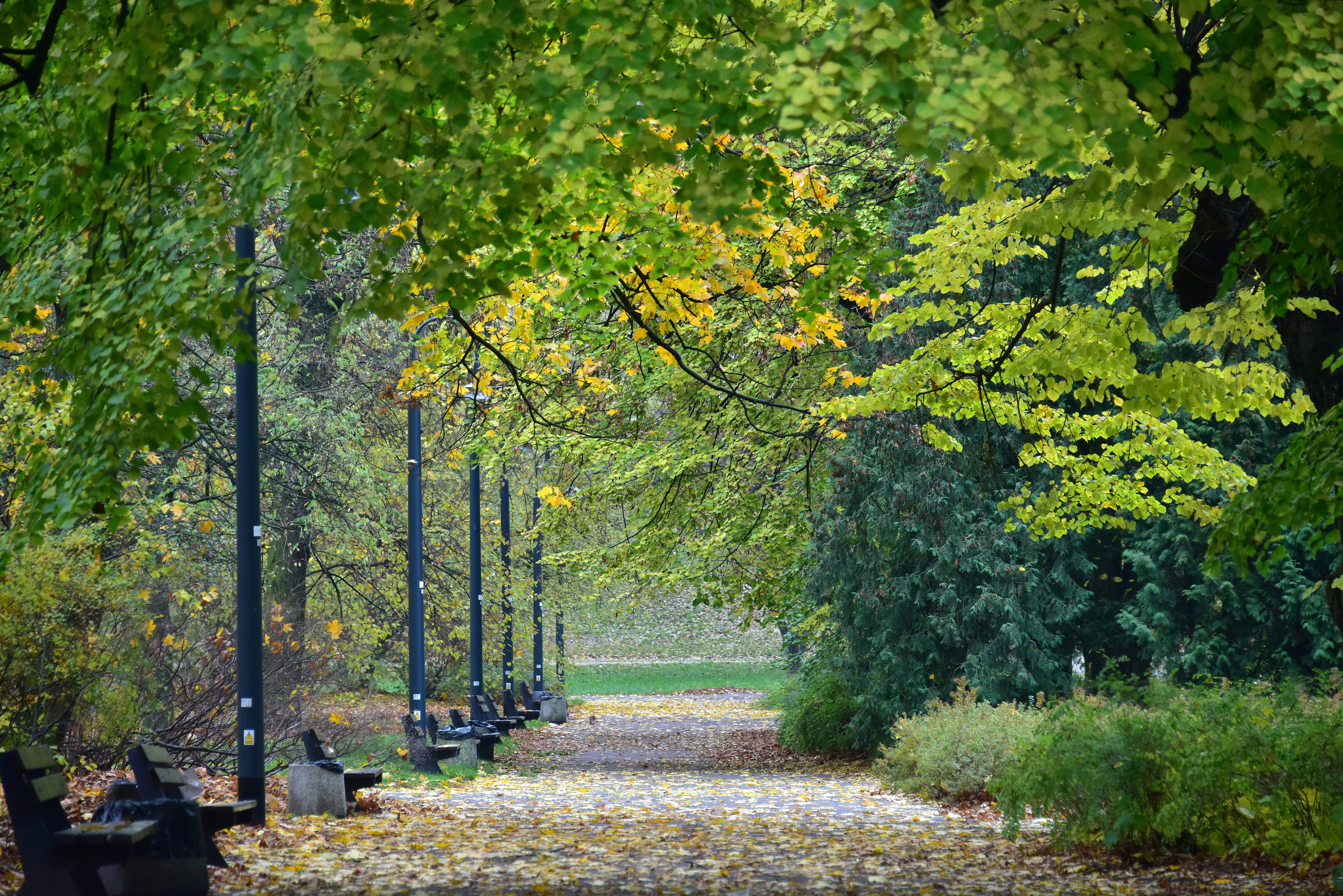
- Park in the autumn.
- Interactive map of Praga Park
- Type: Municipal
- Location: Warsaw
- Area: 18.5 ha
- Created: 1871
- Status: Open all year
- Public transit: Dworzec Wilenski

Soldiers of the Polish First Army Park otherwise known as Praga Park (Polish: park Praski) is a park in Warsaw, Poland. The park is located in the city's Praga district, on the east bank of the Wisła River.

Park was established in 1865-71 and designed by Jan Dobrowolski. In 1927 a zoological garden (Ogród Zoologiczny) was established on the park grounds, and in 1952 a bear run, still open today.

Also found in the park are a statue of the writer Eliza Orzeszkowa which was erected in 1938, the work of sculptor Henryk Kuna, and a giraffe sculpture dating from 1981.

== See also ==
Media related to Park Praski at Wikimedia Commons

- Polish First Army
