= Ząbkowska Street, Warsaw =

Street in Warsaw, Poland

Coordinates: 52.2542°N 21.0434°E

Ząbkowska Street is one of the oldest streets in Warsaw, Poland, located in the Praga-Północ district. It runs east from Targowa Street and is around one kilometre long. Considered one of the most interesting tourist destinations, it is famous for historical buildings, namely tenement houses that were built at the turn of the 20th century.

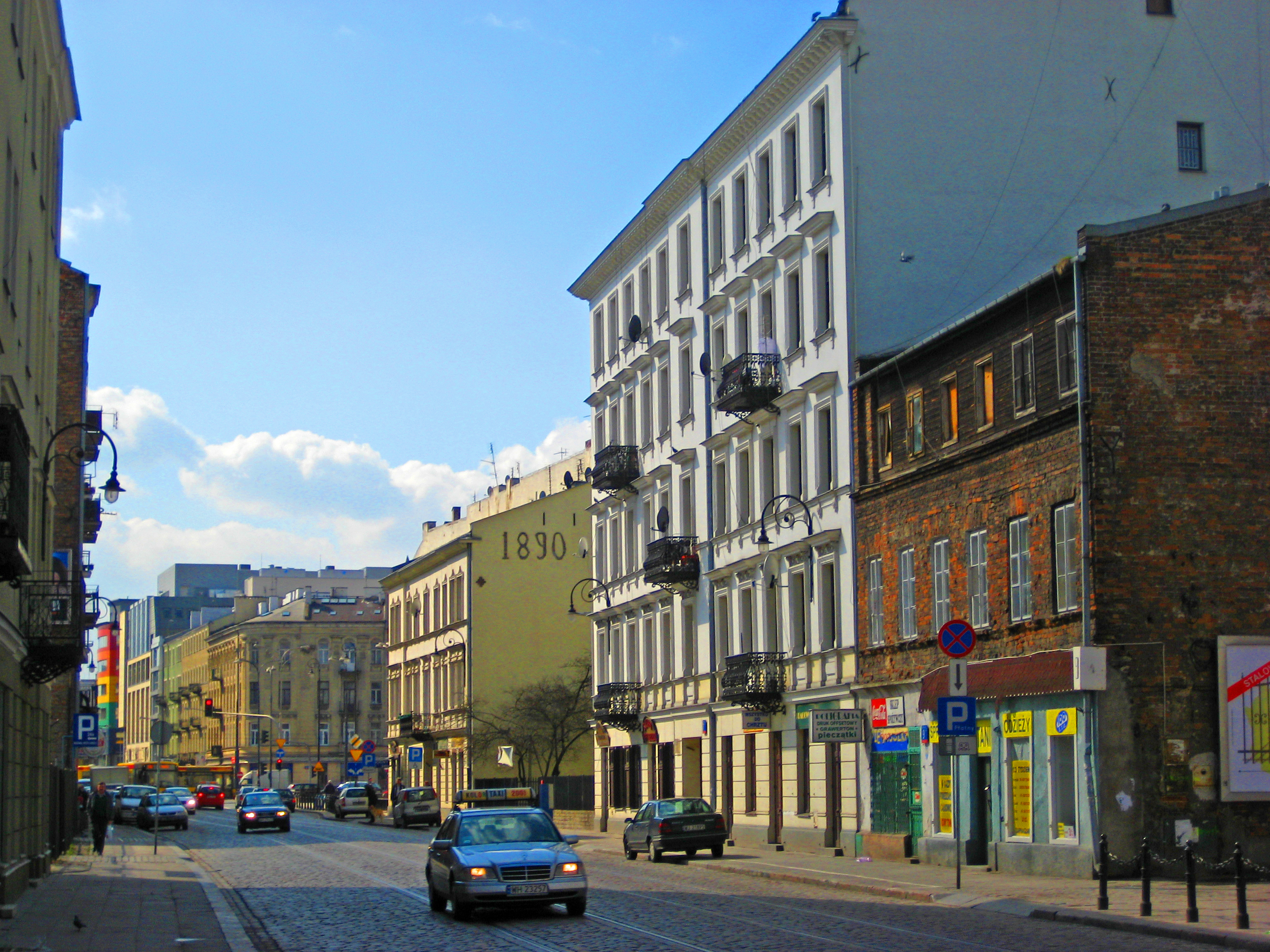
Ząbkowska Street

== History ==
Before the First World War Ząbkowska Street was inhabited mainly by Jewish people. In most cases, they were real estate owners, traders, and entrepreneurs as they belonged to higher levels of the middle class of society. At the beginning of the 20th century, Praga district (later divided into Praga-Północ and Praga Półudnie, Eng. Praga-North, Praga-South) consisted only of a couple of streets. The Jewish community decided to invest money in this area and built great houses which survived both World Wars and many other dramatic events of the history of Warsaw.

Ząbkowska Street was a place of entertainment from the very beginning. At Bazar Różyckiego (one of the most famous permanent marketplaces in Warsaw), which lies in the heart of the street, everyday, hundreds of people exchanged services and spent time together in a friendly, lazy, Warsaw-style atmosphere. Ząbkowska Street was also famous for Vodka Factory ‘’Koneser”, (originally Spirit Distillation Plant) where top quality alcohol was produced. According to varsavianists, there are many fascinating stories connected with this place.

== Ząbkowska Street today ==
Ząbkowska Street is a busy place with many restaurants and bars. In most of them, one can try Polish and Czech specialities at a very low price in comparison with other districts of Warsaw. Ząbkowska Street is a student, tourist and hipster friendly place. It has become an artist hub, where many musicians and painters are still looking for inspiration.

In 2013, Czesław Mozil, famous Polish musician and TV presenter opened his restaurant there. One thing which also lures people to this place is the great atmosphere created by the natives. During the 1943 Warsaw Uprising, the population of the capital of Poland was reduced drastically. From that moment, the structure of the society changed and would never be the same, but at Praga district there is still a lot of people who inherited special features of the native citizens of Warsaw (dialect, style). According to the statistics, Praga is one of the most dangerous places in Warsaw.

== Future ==
According to the future plans, Ząbkowska Street will probably become a walkway. The economists and business experts agree that the second “Metro” line brings profits to the right-side of Warsaw and that Ząbkowska Street will have the chance to become a slightly different version of another famous walkway located in Warsaw - Chmielna Street.
