= Tomasz Sztajerwald =

Polish Roman Catholic bishop (born 1977)

Most Reverend Tomasz Zbigniew Sztajerwald
- Titular Bishop of Cediae, Auxiliary bishop of Warsaw-Praga
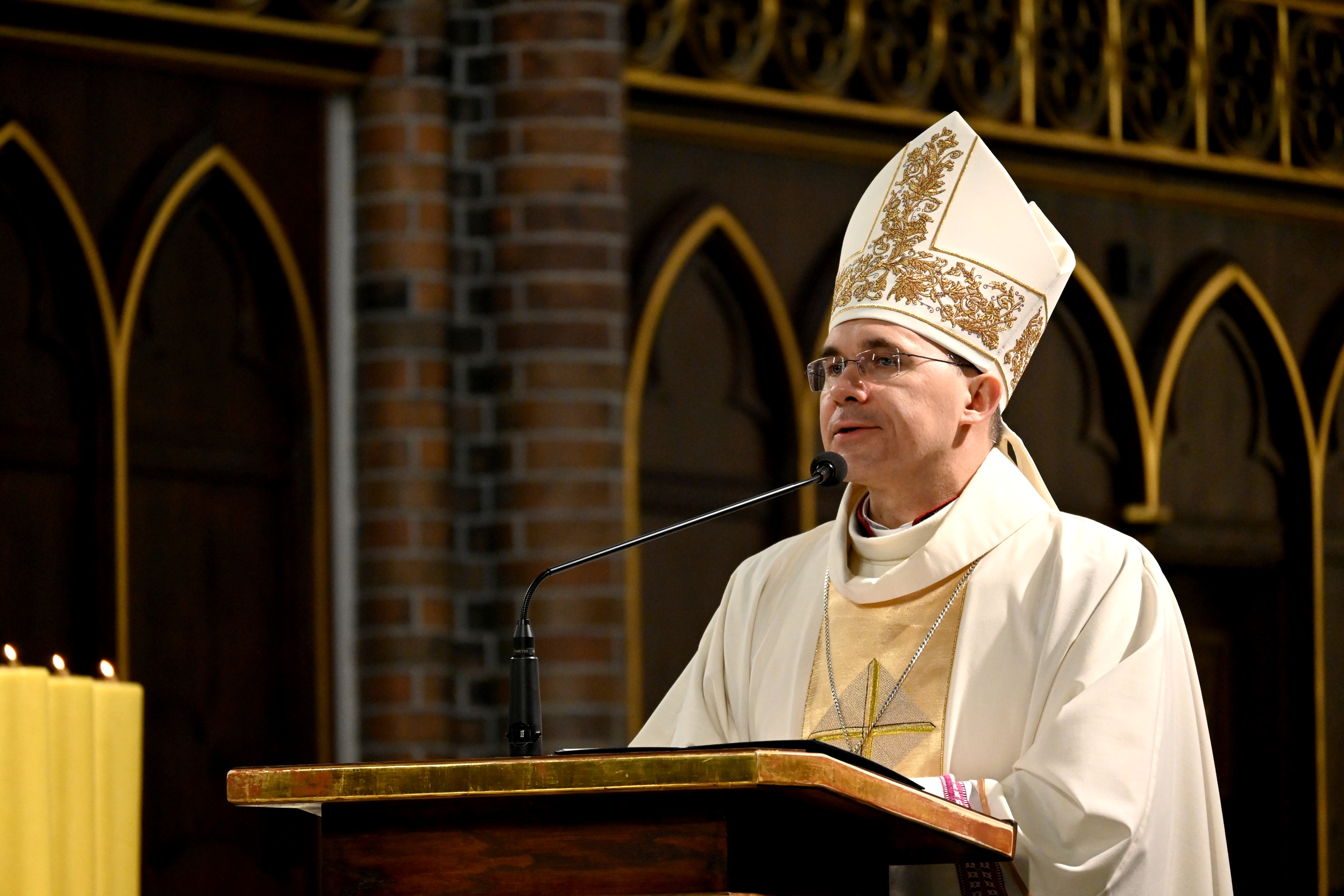
- Church: Catholic Church
- Diocese: Warsaw-Praga
- Appointed: 5 November 2024

Orders
- Ordination: 3 June 2000 by Kazimierz Romaniuk
- Consecration: 7 December 2024 by Antonio Guido Filipazzi, Romuald Kamiński, Jacek Grzybowski

Personal details
- Born: Tomasz Zbigniew Sztajerwald; 24 November 1977 (age 48) Wołomin, Poland
- Residence: Warsaw, Poland
- Education: Cardinal Stefan Wyszyński University in Warsaw
- Motto: Dilexit nos
- Coat of arms

Tomasz Zbigniew Sztajerwald (born 24 November 1977) is a Polish Roman Catholic prelate, who has served as an auxiliary bishop of the Diocese of Warsaw-Praga and a titular bishop of Cediae since 2024.

== Early life and education ==
Tomasz Sztajerwald was born on 24 November 1977 in Wołomin. He underwent his philosophical and theological studies at the Major Seminary of Warszawa-Praga. He was ordained a priest on 3 June 2000 by Bishop Kazimierz Romaniuk.

Following his ordination, he pursued further studies at the Cardinal Stefan Wyszyński University in Warsaw, where he obtained a licentiate in psychology in 2009. In 2020, he earned a doctorate in psychology from the same university.

== Priesthood ==
Sztajerwald served as a curate at the parish of the Transfiguration in Radzymin (2000–2006). He later became a prefect at the Major Seminary of Warszawa-Praga, eventually serving as its vice-rector and, from 2021 until his episcopal appointment, as its rector.

== Episcopal ministry ==
On 5 November 2024, Pope Francis appointed him auxiliary bishop of the Diocese of Warsaw-Praga, assigning him the titular see of Cediae. He received his episcopal consecration on 7 December 2024 at the Cathedral of St. Michael the Archangel and St. Florian the Martyr from the Apostolic Nuncio Archbishop Antonio Guido Filipazzi, with Bishop Romuald Kamiński and Bishop Jacek Grzybowski serving as co-consecrators.

In 2025, he expressed that his ministry is shaped by the "experience of the universal Church," emphasizing the importance of spiritual enrichment through communal faith.
