= Diocese of Warsaw-Praga =

Latin Catholic diocese in Poland

Coordinates: 52°15′06″N 21°01′50″E

Diocese of Warszawa-Praga Dioecesis Varsaviensis-Pragensis Diecezja Warszawsko-Praska

Catholic
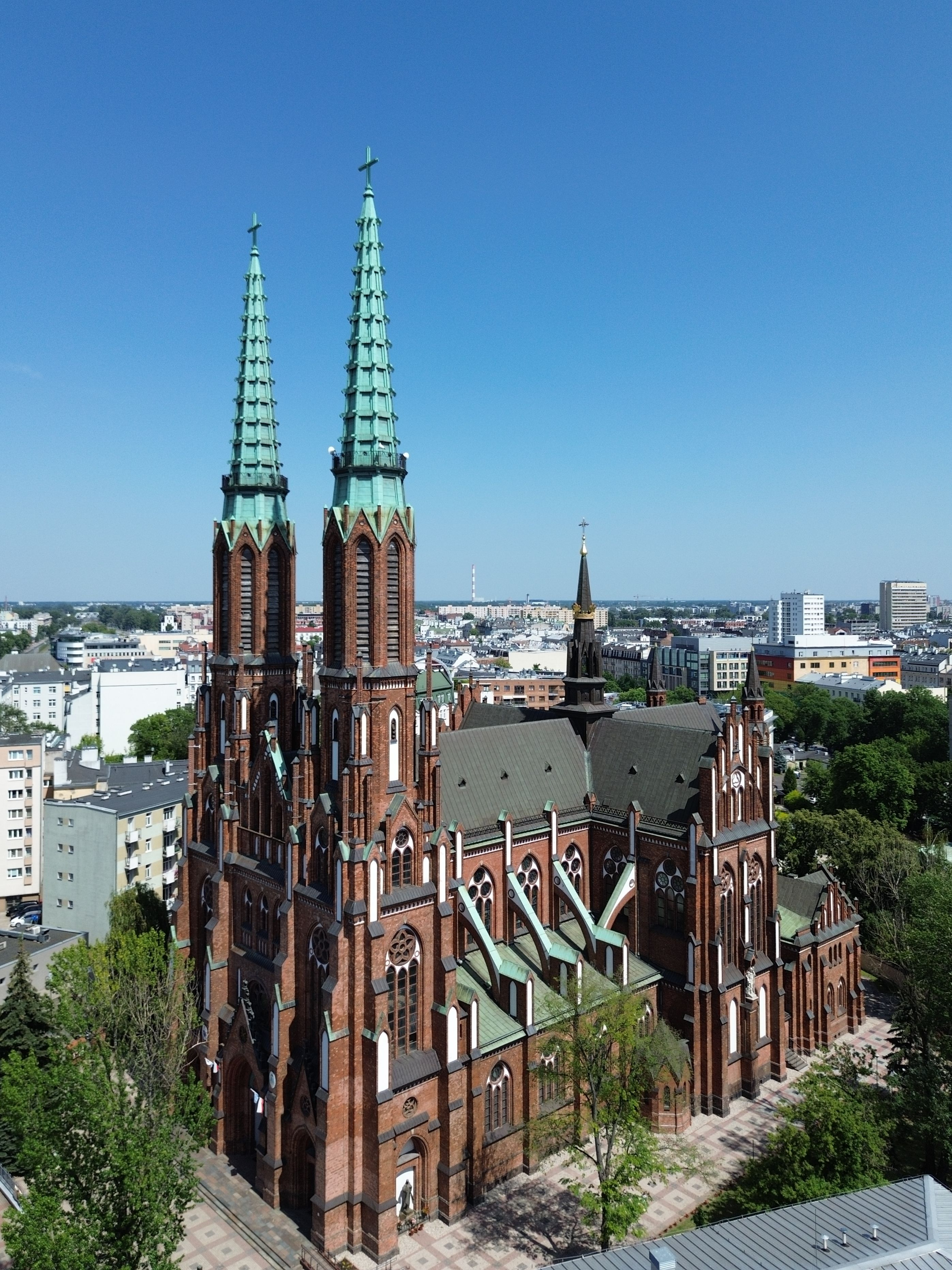
- Cathedral Basilica of St. Michael the Archangel

Location
- Country: Poland
- Episcopal conference: Polish Episcopal Conference
- Ecclesiastical province: Province of Warszawa
- Metropolitan: Archdiocese of Warsaw

Statistics
- Area: 3,300 km^{2} (1,300 sq mi)
- Population: Total; Catholics: (as of 2022); ▼1,418,260; ▼1,113,340 (▼78.5%)
- Parishes: ▲186 (2022)

Information
- Denomination: Catholic Church
- Sui iuris church: Latin Church
- Rite: Roman Rite
- Established: 25 March 1992 (34 years ago)
- Cathedral: Cathedral Basilica of St. Michael the Archangel
- Co-cathedral: Co-Cathedral of Our Lady of Victory
- Secular priests: 592 (total); 450 (secular); 142 (religious)

Current leadership
- Pope: Leo XIV
- Bishop: Romuald Kamiński
- Metropolitan Archbishop: Adrian Joseph Galbas
- Auxiliary Bishops: Jacek Grzybowski, Tomasz Sztajerwald

Website
- diecezja.waw.pl

Map of Roman Catholic Diocese of Warszawa-Praga

The Diocese of Warszawa-Praga (Latin: Dioecesis Varsaviensis-Pragensis) is a Latin Church diocese of the Catholic Church located in the east part of Warsaw (Praga) in the ecclesiastical province of Warszawa in Poland.

According to the church statistics about 31.4% attended a church at least once a week and about 14.6% took communion regularly (once a week or more often) in 2013.

The diocese covers 3,300 km^{2} (1,300 sq mi). As of 2022, the population of the territory of the diocese is 1,418,260, of which 1,113,340 are Catholic (78.5%) in 186 parishes. The diocese has 592 priests (450 secular priests and 142 religious priests), 145 male non-priest religious and 1,097 female religious.

== History ==
- March 25, 1992: Established as Diocese of Warszawa – Praga from the Diocese of Płock and Metropolitan Archdiocese of Warszawa
- May 24, 2008: Archbishop (personal title) Henryk Hoser S.A.C., adjunct secretary of the Congregation for the Evangelization of Peoples and president of the Pontifical Mission Societies, was appointed as bishop of Warszawa-Praga, Poland. He conserved his personal title of archbishop.

== Notable churches ==
Cathedral Basilica of St. Michael the Archangel and St. Florian

- Minor Basilicas:
  - Bazylika Najświętszego Serca Jezusowego in Praga (Sacred Heart)
  - Bazylika Trójcy Przenajświętszej in Kobyłka (Holy Trinity)

== Leadership ==
- Bishops of Warszawa-Praga (Roman rite)
  - Bishop Kazimierz Romaniuk (1992–2004)
  - Archbishop Sławoj Leszek Głódź (2004–2008)
  - Archbishop Henryk Hoser (2008-2017)
  - Bishop Romuald Kamiński (since 2017)

== Auxiliary Bishops ==
- Zbigniew Józef Kraszewski, titular bishop of Horreomargum (1992–1997)
- Stanisław Kędziora, titular bishop of Tucci (1992–2011)
- Marek Solarczyk, titular bishop of Hólar (2011–2021)
- Romuald Kamiński, coadjutor bishop (2017)
- Jacek Grzybowski, titular bishop of Nova (since 2020)
- Tomasz Zbigniew Sztajerwald, titular bishop of Cediae (since 2024)

== Sex abuse reports ==
On September 27, 2018, Bishop Romuald Kamiński apologized for the history of sex abuse of minors in the Diocese. He also stated that work on a document addressing the Polish Catholic Church on the abuse of minors and suggesting ways to prevent it was completed. Archbishop Wojciech Polak, who serves as the Primate of Poland, also stated this document would also contain data on the sexual abuse committed by Catholic clergy in Poland. Statistics were released on 14 April 2019, commissioned by the Episcopal Conference of Poland and with data from over 10,000 local parishes. It was found that from 1990 to mid-2018, abuse reports about 382 priests were made to the Church, with 625 children, mostly under 16, sexually abused by members of the Catholic clergy. There were opinions that the figures underestimated the extent of the problem, and failed to answer questions church officials had avoided for years. Marek Lisinski, the co-founder of Don’t Be Afraid, which represents victims of clerical abuse, said "Tell us how [the priests] hurt those children and how many times they were transferred to different parishes before you paid notice". The data were released a few weeks after Pope Francis had called for "an all-out battle against the abuse of minors". After pressure from the Pope, in the preceding years Poland's church had publicly apologized to abuse victims, and accepted the need to report those accused of such crimes. In earlier times clergy to whom sexual abuse of minors was reported were not required by their superiors to notify the police, but to investigate themselves, and if necessary, inform the Vatican.

== See also ==
- Catholic Church in Poland
- List of Catholic dioceses in Poland
