= Henryk Hoser =

Polish prelate of the Catholic Church (1942–2021)

His Excellency Henryk Hoser SAC
- Archbishop-Bishop of Warszawa-Praga; Archbishop ad personam
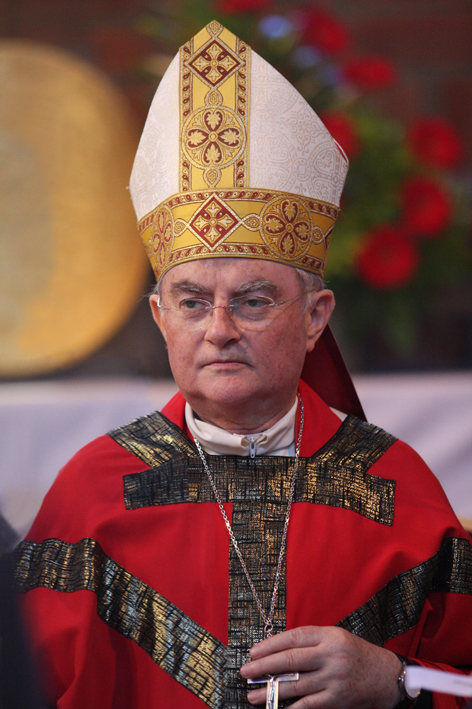
- Henryk Hoser in 2009.
- Archdiocese: Warszawa-Praga
- See: Warszawa-Praga
- Appointed: 24 May 2008
- Installed: 28 June 2008
- Term ended: 8 December 2017
- Predecessor: Sławoj Leszek Głódź
- Successor: Romuald Kamiński
- Other post: Apostolic Visitor to Medjugorje (2017-21)
- Previous posts: Titular Archbishop of Tepelta (2005-08); President of the Pontifical Mission Societies (2005-08); Adjunct Secretary of the Congregation for the Evangelization of Peoples (2005-08)

Orders
- Ordination: 16 June 1974 by Władysław Miziołek
- Consecration: 19 March 2005 by Crescenzio Sepe

Personal details
- Born: 27 November 1942 Warsaw, General Government, Nazi Germany (now Poland)
- Died: 13 August 2021 (aged 78) Centralny Szpital Kliniczny MSWiA, Warsaw, Poland
- Motto: Maior est Deus ("God is greater")
- Coat of arms: Henryk Hoser SAC's coat of arms

Ordination history of Henryk Hoser
History
Priestly ordination
- Ordained by: Bishop Wladyslaw Miziolek
Episcopal consecration
- Principal consecrator: Crescenzio Sepe
- Co-consecrators: Stanisław Dziwisz, Archbishop Thaddée Ntihinyurwa
Episcopal succession
Bishops consecrated by Henryk Hoser as principal consecrator
- Bishop Marek Solarczyk: 19 November 2011
- George Antonysamy: 21 September 2005
- Michael August Blume: 30 September 2005
- Archbishop Tadeusz Wojda, S.A.C.: 10 June 2017

Styles of Henryk Hoser
- Reference style: The Most Reverend
- Spoken style: Your Excellency
- Religious style: Monsignor

Henryk Franciszek Hoser (27 November 1942 – 13 August 2021) was a Polish prelate of the Catholic Church. He was Archbishop-bishop of Roman Catholic Diocese of Warszawa-Praga in Poland from 2008 to 2017.

== Biography ==
Hoser was trained as a physician before joining the Pallottines in 1969.

He was president of the Pontifical Mission Societies before he was elevated to the title of archbishop ad personam in 2005 by Pope John Paul II. On 24 May 2008, Pope Benedict XVI appointed him to head Roman Catholic Diocese of Warszawa-Praga. He was a member of the Presidium of the Polish Episcopal Conference and headed the Team of Experts on Bioethics. Bishop Hoser was a staunch opponent of in vitro fertilisation.

Hoser was intensely criticised in 2013, when he refused to remove a priest from active duty who was convicted of molesting two altar boys. On the other hand, Hoser removed a priest Wojciech Lemanski, who used his pulpit to criticize the church. Lemanski’s criticisms centered around anti-Semitic tendencies in Poland; the church’s lenient treatment of clerics accused of sexual abuse; the church’s opposition to artificial insemination and contraceptives.

On 11 February 2017, Pope Francis named Bishop Hoser his special envoy to Medjugorje, tasked with assessing the pastoral needs of that place of pilgrimage.

Hoser delivered Pope Francis his examination of the pastoral situation of Medjugorje in the summer of 2017. He was tasked by the pope with assessing the pastoral situation and not the doctrinal situation which was done by Cardinal Ruini. However he made it clear that he thought very highly of the Medjugorje phenomenon. After his resignation as archbishop of the diocese of Warszawa-Praga was accepted on 8 December 2017, he was made Apostolic Visitor for an undetermined time for Medjugorje by Pope Francis on 31 May 2018.

Hoser died from COVID-19 on 13 August 2021, during the COVID-19 pandemic in Poland.
