= Kędziora =

Kędziora ([kɛnˈd͡ʑɔra]), Kędzior ([ˈkɛnd͡ʑɔr]), Kendziora, Kendzior, or Kandziora is a surname. It comes from the Polish word kędzior, meaning "lock of hair".

It may refer to:

- Marcel Kandziora (born 1990), German footballer
- Aleksander Kędzior (1897–1986), Polish colonel
- Andrzej Kędzior (1851–1938), Polish politician
- Jan Kędzior (1880–1955), Polish politician
- Stanisław Kędziora (1934–2017), auxiliary bishop in Warsaw
- Tomasz Kędziora (born 1994), Polish footballer
- Wojciech Kędziora (born 1980), Polish footballer
- Sarah Kendzior (born 1978), American journalist and author
- Valdemar Kendzior (1926–1998), Danish footballer
- Yaroslav Kendzior (born 1941), Ukrainian journalist, human rights activist, and former member of parliament
- Kerri Buchberger-Kendziora (born 1970), Canadian volleyball player
