= Stanisław Kędziora =

- Titular Bishop of Tucci
- Church: Roman Catholic Church
- Diocese: Diocese of Warszawa-Praga
- In office: 1992 – 2011
- Other posts: Auxiliary Bishop of the Archdiocese of Warsaw (1987–1992)

Orders
- Ordination: 11 August 1957 (as a deacon) by Zygmunt Choromański
- Consecration: 25 March 1987 by Józef Glemp, Władysław Miziołek, Kazimierz Romaniuk
- Rank: Auxiliary Bishop

Personal details
- Born: 6 December 1934 Seligów, Łowicz County, Poland
- Died: 25 December 2017 (aged 83) Warsaw, Poland
- Buried: Bródno Cemetery
- Denomination: Roman Catholicism
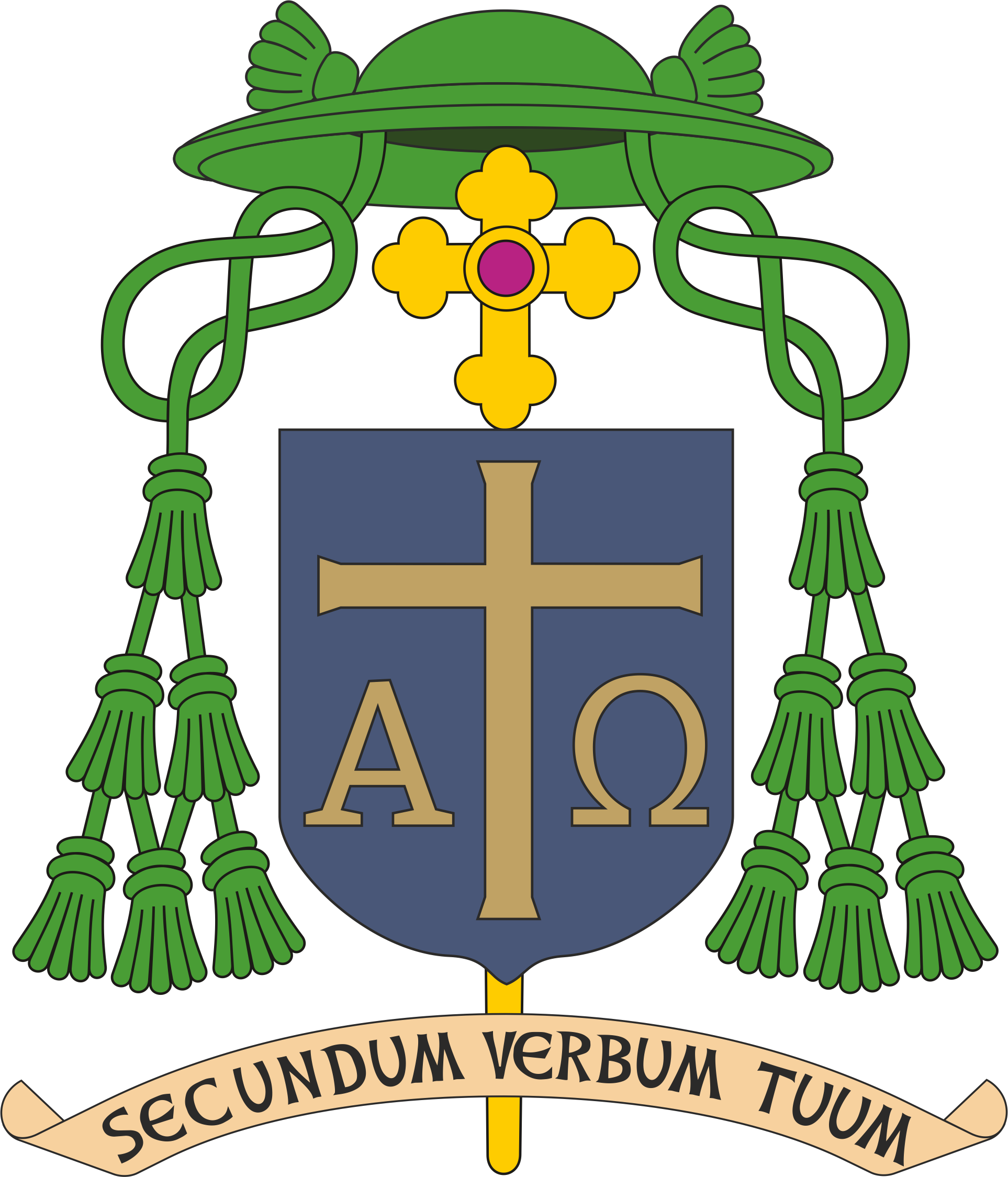
- Coat of arms

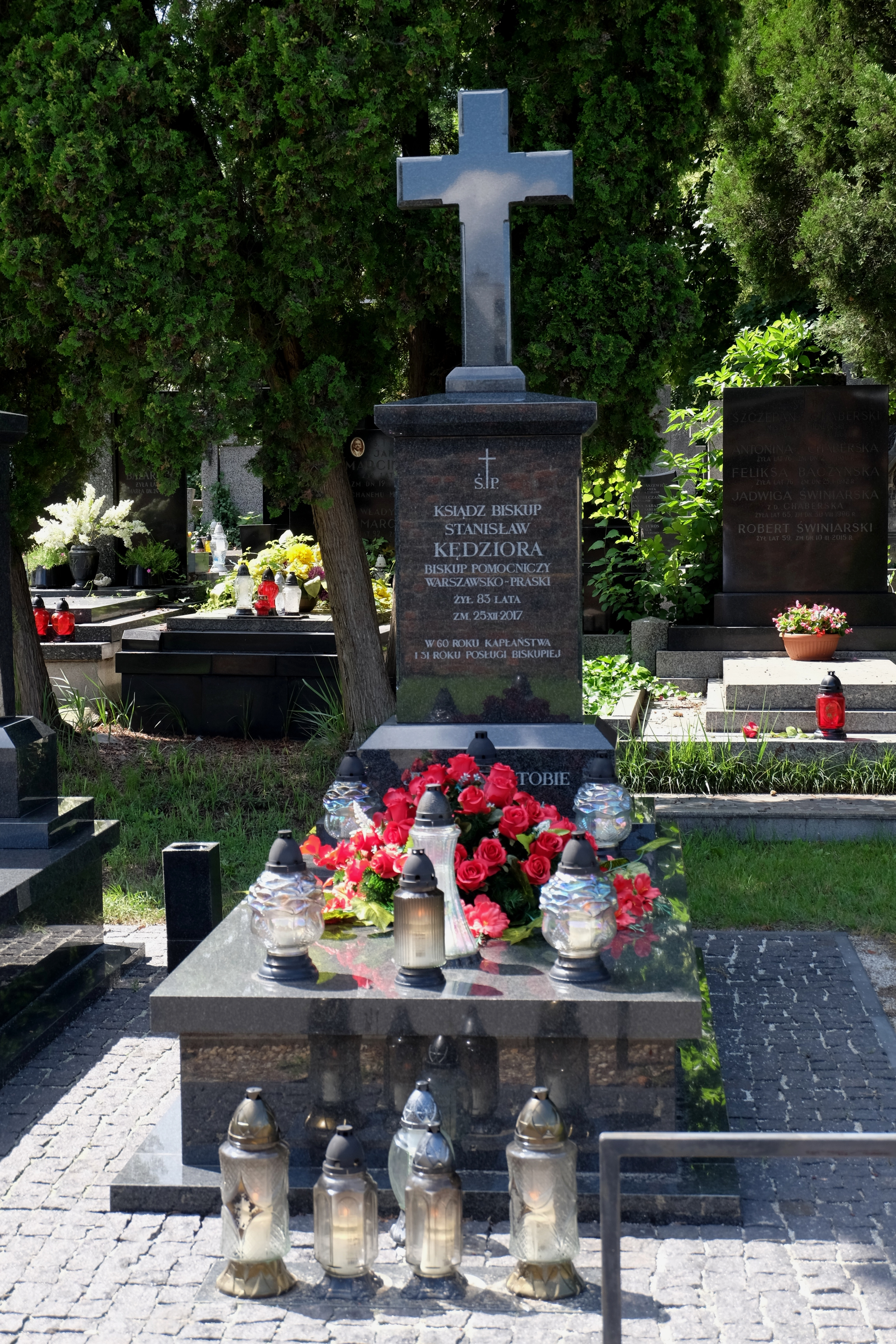
Kędziora grave in Bródno Cemetery

Stanisław Kędziora (6 December 1934 – 25 December 2017) was a Polish Roman Catholic bishop and doctor of theology. He served as auxiliary bishop of the Archdiocese of Warsaw from 1987 to 1992 and as auxiliary of the Diocese of Warszawa-Praga from 1992 to 2011.

== Biography ==
Kędziora was born on 6 December 1934 in Seligów. From 1948 to 1952, he attended the secondary school in Łowicz. After finishing secondary school, he was an employee at the commune's office. From 1953 to 1958, he studied philosophy and theology at the Higher Metropolitan Seminary in Warsaw. He was ordained as a subdeacon on 29 June 1957 by the auxiliary bishop of Warsaw at the time, Zygmunt Choromański. Subsequently, he was ordained as a deacon on 11 August 1957 by Cardinal Stefan Wyszyński. Kędziora was ordained to be a presbyter on 3 August 1958 at St. John's Archcathedral, Warsaw, again by Wyszyński. From 1961 to 1964, he continued his studies in dogmatic theology at the Faculty of Theology of the Catholic University of Lublin, where he graduated with a bachelor's degree. He then obtained a doctorate in theology from the same university in 1971 with his dissertation titled Science of Saint Bernard of Clairvaux on the mystical knowledge of God.

From 1958 to 1961, and again from 1964 to 1965, Kędziora worked as a vicar and a catechist for the Parish of St. Floriana, based in Brwinów. From 1982 to 1987, he was the parson of the Parish of All Saints, based in Warsaw, as well as the dean of the deanery of Warszawa-Śródmieście. In 1985, he became a member of the priesthood council and the collegio consutorum. In 1976, he was given the privilege of Rochettum et Mantolettum.

From 1965 to 1987, he was a lecturer in dogmatic theology at the Higher Metropolitan Seminary. From 1965 to 1971, he was the Apostolic prefect of the seminary, and from 1971 to 1982, he was the vice-rector.

On 11 March 1987, Kędziora was appointed as an Auxiliary Bishop of the Archdiocese of Warsaw, along with becoming the titular bishop of Tucci. He was ordained on 25 March 1987 at Łowicz Cathedral. Cardinal Józef Glemp consecrated him with the assistance of fellow auxiliary bishops Władysław Miziołek and Kazimierz Romaniuk. For his episcopal motto, he adopted the Latin phrase "Secundum Verbum Tuum" (Latin: According to Your Word). In the Roman curia, he was the chairman of the Faculty of Catholic Science. He became a member of the priesthood council, a member of the collegio consutorum of the archdiocese, and a member of the economic council of the archdiocese.

On 25 March 1992, Kędziora was transferred to become the auxiliary bishop of the Diocese of Warszawa-Praga. He was appointed vicar general of the diocese. In the Roman curia, he was the chairman of the Department of General Administration and the Faculty of Catholic Science. He became the deputy chairman of the priesthood council and a member of the collegio consutorum of the diocese. In 2008, as a result of the transfer of the diocesan bishop Sławoj Leszek Głódź to the Archdiocese of Gdańsk, Kędziora became the Diocesan administrator of the diocese. In 1992, he was appointed as a prelate of the cathedral chapter of the diocese of Warszawa-Praga. On 5 January 2011, Pope Benedict XVI accepted his resignation as auxiliary bishop.

As part of the Episcopal Conference of Poland, Kędziora joined the Clergy Commission, the Commission for Academic Pastoral Affairs, the Commission for Institutes of Consecrated Life and Societies of Apostolic Life, and the Committee on Catholic Education.

Kędziora died on 25 December 2017 in Warsaw. He was buried at Bródno Cemetery on 29 December 2017.

== Awards ==
By the decision of the former President of the Republic of Poland, Lech Kaczyński on 17 July 2008, Kędziora was awarded the Officer's Cross class of the Order of Polonia Restituta.
