= Józef Kowalczyk =

Polish Catholic prelate, lawyer and diplomat

His Excellency Józef Kowalczyk
- Archbishop Emeritus of Gniezno; Primate Emeritus of Poland
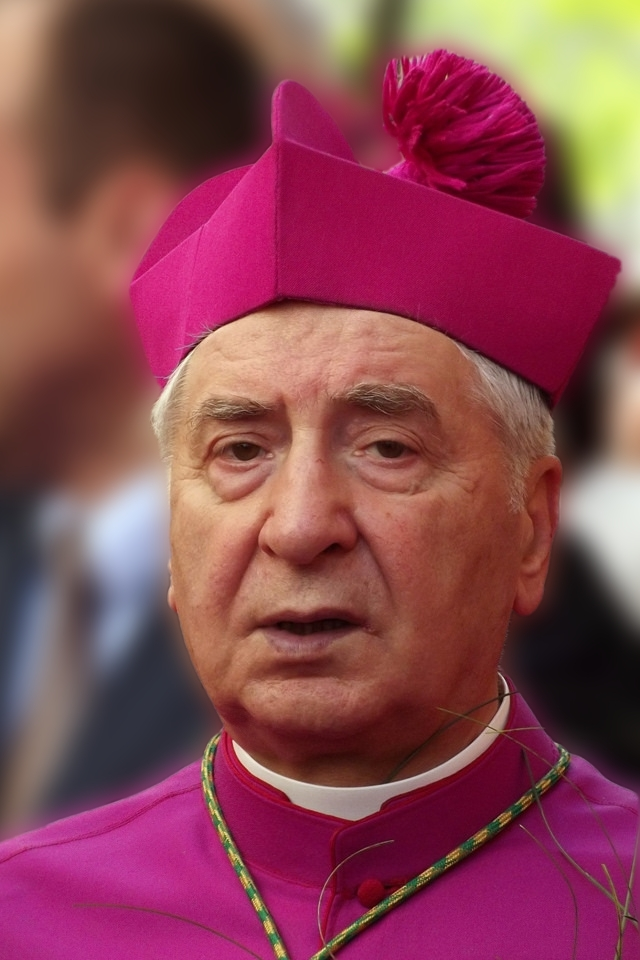
- Kowalczyk in 2014
- Church: Roman Catholic
- Archdiocese: Gniezno
- Installed: 26 June 2010
- Term ended: 17 May 2014
- Other post: Titular Archbishop of Heraclea (1989–2010)

Orders
- Ordination: 14 January 1962 by Józef Drzazga
- Consecration: 20 October 1989 by John Paul II

Personal details
- Born: 28 August 1938 Jadowniki Mokre, Poland
- Died: 20 August 2025 (aged 86) Tarnów, Poland
- Denomination: Roman Catholic
- Motto: Fiat Voluntas Tua (Thy will be done)
- Coat of arms

Józef Kowalczyk (Polish: [ˈjuzɛf kɔˈvalt͡ʂɨk]; 28 August 1938 – 20 August 2025) was a Polish Roman Catholic prelate, canon lawyer and diplomat who, from 1989 to 2010, served as the first apostolic nuncio to Poland since World War II. He later served as archbishop of Gniezno and primate of Poland until his retirement in 2014.

== Education and early career ==
Kowalczyk was born on 28 August 1938 in the village of Jadowniki Mokre near Tarnów. In 1956 he began to study at the Seminary of Olsztyn, a successor institution of the Collegium Hosianum. He was ordained priest by auxiliary bishop Józef Drzazga on 14 January 1962 and nominated vicar at the parish of the Holy Trinity in Kwidzyn shortly thereafter. In October 1963, he began his training in canon law at the Catholic University of Lublin and moved to Rome to continue his studies at the Pontifical Gregorian University in February 1965. He earned his doctorate in canon law in 1968 and a diploma of advocate of the Roman Rota in 1971. He also received a diploma of archivist of the Vatican Secret Archives.

On 19 December 1969, Kowalczyk began to work at the Congregation for Divine Worship and the Discipline of the Sacraments. In the years 1976–1978, he accompanied the nuncio for special assignments, Archbishop Luigi Poggi, on trips to Communist Poland. On 18 October 1978, two days after Cardinal Karol Wojtyła became Pope John Paul II, Kowalczyk was asked to set up a Polish section of the Vatican Secretariat of State. He went on as the head of this section until 1989. In this capacity, he often accompanied the Pope in his foreign visits. Kowalczyk was additionally charged with the task of overseeing the translation and publication of works written by Wojtyła before his accession to the papacy.

According to the daily Rzeczpospolita, documents held by the Institute of National Remembrance indicate that, from 1982 until 1990, Kowalczyk was registered by the Polish Communist secret police (Służba Bezpieczeństwa) as a source of information under codename "Cappino". It is uncertain whether Kowalczyk knew he was registered or that he agreed to it.

== Nuncio to Poland ==
Following Solidarity's victory in the parliamentary election in June 1989, Poland resumed diplomatic relations with the Holy See on 17 July 1989. On 26 August 1989, Pope John Paul II nominated Kowalczyk as the first post-war apostolic nuncio to Poland. The pope consecrated him as titular archbishop of Heraclea in St. Peter's Basilica on 20 October 1989. Kowalczyk chose the words Fiat Voluntas Tua ("Thy will be done", quote from the Pater Noster) as his episcopal motto; his episcopal coat of arms is charged with a cross, a pastoral staff, a star symbolizing the Blessed Virgin Mary, and a plough symbolizing Kowalczyk's rural origin. The nuncio arrived in Warsaw on 23 November 1989 and presented his letter of credence to President Wojciech Jaruzelski on 6 December 1989.

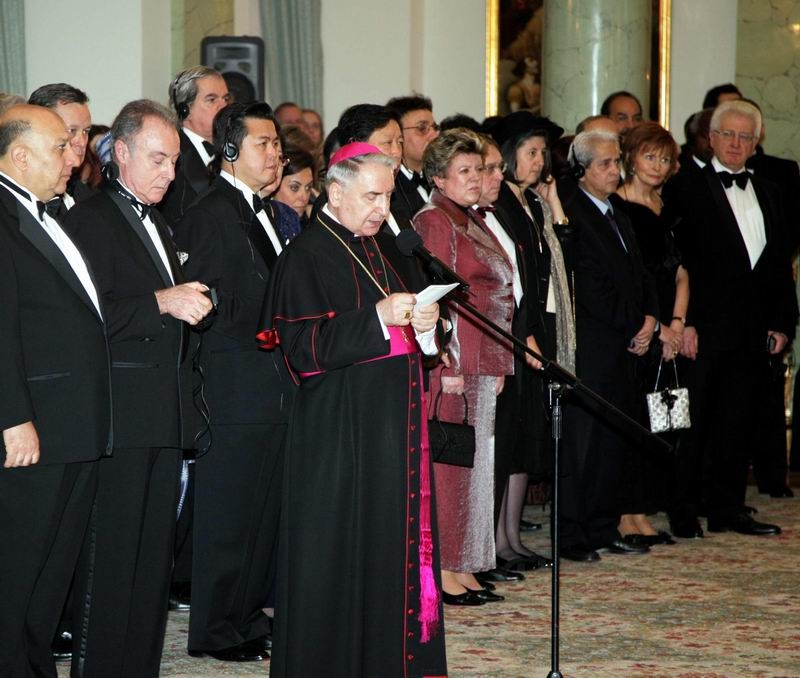
Józef Kowalczyk with the diplomatic corps at the Presidential Palace in Warsaw

As apostolic nuncio, Kowalczyk oversaw the restoration of the Military Ordinariate of Poland in 1991. In collaboration with the Polish Bishops’ Conference, he directed a comprehensive reorganization of the Catholic Church’s administrative structure in Poland. This reform culminated in the papal bull Totus Tuus Poloniae Populus of 1992, which established 13 new dioceses, elevated eight existing dioceses to the rank of archdiocese, and adjusted ecclesiastical boundaries to conform with Poland’s post-war frontiers.

Kowalczyk also played a central role in negotiating the concordat between the Holy See and Poland. Signed on 28 July 1993 and ratified in 1998, the agreement recognized, among other provisions, the legal personality of the Catholic Church in Poland and the civil validity of canonically contracted marriages. The Polish concordat became a model both for subsequent concordats in Europe and for legal frameworks governing relations between the Polish state and other denominations. In addition, Kowalczyk was responsible for preparing papal visits to Poland by John Paul II and Benedict XVI in 1991, 1995, 1997, 1999, 2002, and 2006.

By tradition, the apostolic nuncio serves as dean of the diplomatic corps in Poland, and in this role Kowalczyk enjoyed significant influence. Although he was not formally a member of the Polish Bishops’ Conference, he acted as a trusted adviser and was responsible for proposing candidates for episcopal appointments to the Holy See. Over the course of his 21-year tenure—the longest nunciature in a single country in Vatican history—he exercised considerable influence on the composition of the Polish episcopate.

== Primate of Poland ==
On 8 May 2010, Pope Benedict XVI accepted the resignation of Archbishop Henryk Muszyński and appointed Kowalczyk as Archbishop of Gniezno and Primate of Poland. He was formally installed at Gniezno Cathedral on 26 June 2010. The primatial title—traditionally associated with the holder of the oldest archiepiscopal see in Poland—no longer confers substantive authority within either the national hierarchy or the wider structures of the Church, but it continues to carry considerable prestige.

On 17 May 2014, Pope Francis accepted Kowalczyk's resignation from the archiepiscopal see of Gniezno. On the same day, Archbishop Wojciech Polak was appointed his successor.

== Illness and death ==
On 28 July 2025, Archbishop Wojciech Polak announced that Kowalczyk had been hospitalized in serious condition and appealed to the faithful to pray for him. He died on 20 August 2025, eight days before his 87th birthday.

Catholic Church titles
Vacant Title last held by Filippo Cortesi	Apostolic Nuncio to Poland; 26 August 1989 – 8 May 2010	Succeeded by Celestino Migliore
Preceded by Emilio Lorenzo Stehle	Titular Archbishop of Heraclea; 26 August 1989 – 8 May 2010	Succeeded by Enrico dal Covolo
Preceded by Henryk Muszyński	Archbishop of Gniezno and Primate of Poland; 8 May 2010 – 17 May 2014	Succeeded by Wojciech Polak
