= Seligów =

- Village
- Location within Poland
- Coordinates: 51°59′59″N 19°57′55″E
- Country: Poland
- Voivodeship: Łódź
- County: Łowicz
- Gmina: Łyszkowice

Seligów [sɛˈliɡuf] is a village in the administrative district of Gmina Łyszkowice, within Łowicz County, Łódź Voivodeship, in central Poland.

== Notable people ==
- Stanisław Kędziora (1934–2017), Roman Catholic bishop
