= Romuald Kamiński =

Polish Roman Catholic priest (born 1955)

- Bishop of Warsaw-Prague
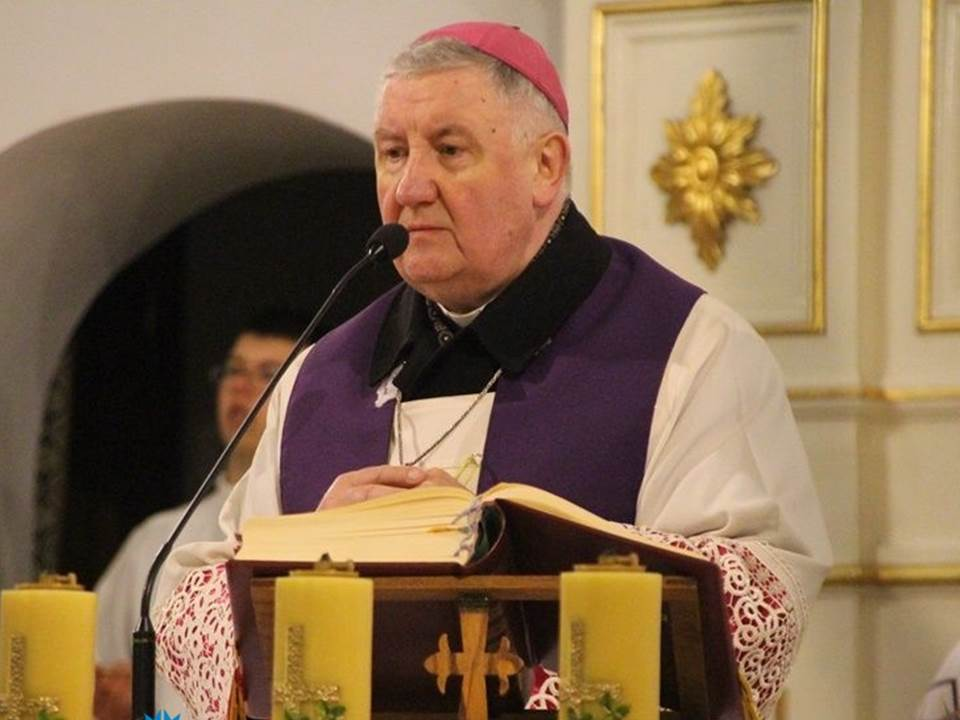
- Kamiński in 2017
- Church: Roman Catholic Church
- Diocese: Roman Catholic Diocese of Warszawa-Praga
- In office: 8 December 2017
- Predecessor: Henryk Hoser

Orders
- Ordination: 7 June 1981 by Jerzy Modzelewski
- Rank: Bishop

Personal details
- Born: 7 February 1955 (age 71) Janówka, Poland

Coat of arms of Romuald Kamiński

Romuald Kamiński (born 7 February 1955, Janówka, Poland) is a Polish Roman Catholic priest who has served as bishop of Warszawa-Praga since 2017. He was the auxiliary bishop of Ełk between 2005 and 2017.

== Biography ==
Kamiński was born 7 February 1955 in Janówka. He graduated from the Higher Metropolitan Seminary in Warsaw. He also earned his master's degree in theology. He was ordained a priest on 7 June 1981 by the auxiliary bishop of Warsaw, Jerzy Modzelewski. He was incardinated into the Archdiocese of Warsaw.

From 1981 to 1983, he worked as a vicar in the parish of Our Lady in Otwock. From 1983 to 1992, he served as administrator of the Archbishops of Warsaw. At the same time he was a chaplain of Józef Glemp. In 1992, he became chancellor of the episcopal curia of the newly established Diocese of Warszawa-Praga. He also became a collegium consultant and a part of the council of priests of the diocese.

On 8 June 2005, Pope Benedict XVI appointed him the auxiliary bishop of the Diocese of Ełk and titular bishop of Aguntum. He was ordained bishop on 23 June 2005 in the Cathedral of St. Wojciech in Ełk. He was ordained by archbishop Józef Kowalczyk, the apostolic nuncio in Poland, accompanied by Jerzy Mazur, the bishop of the diocese of Ełk, and Kazimierz Romaniuk, a retired diocesan bishop from Warszawa-Praga. As a bishop, he took as his motto "Sub Tuum praesidium".

He was the chairman of the Polish Episcopal Conference, a delegate for the Episcopal Conference of Lithuania, and a delegate for Dialogue of Catholics and Muslims. He is also a part of the Institutes of Consecrated Life and Societies of Apostolic Life Council, the Families Council, the Religious Dialogue and Team, and regularly contacts representatives of the Greek Catholic Church in Ukraine.

On 14 September 2017, Pope Francis named Kamińskin bishop coadjutor of Warszawa-Praga. On 8 December 2017, he succeeded as bishop when Pope Francis accepted the resignation of Bishop Henryk Hoser. On 8 December 2017, Pope Francis accepted Hoser's resignation as bishop of Warszawa-Praga, just 10 days after Hoser's 75th birthday, when he was required to submit resignation. And coadjutor Kamiński automatically succeeds. Kamiński was installed there on 20 January 2018.
