= Janówka, Podlaskie Voivodeship =

Janówka
- Village
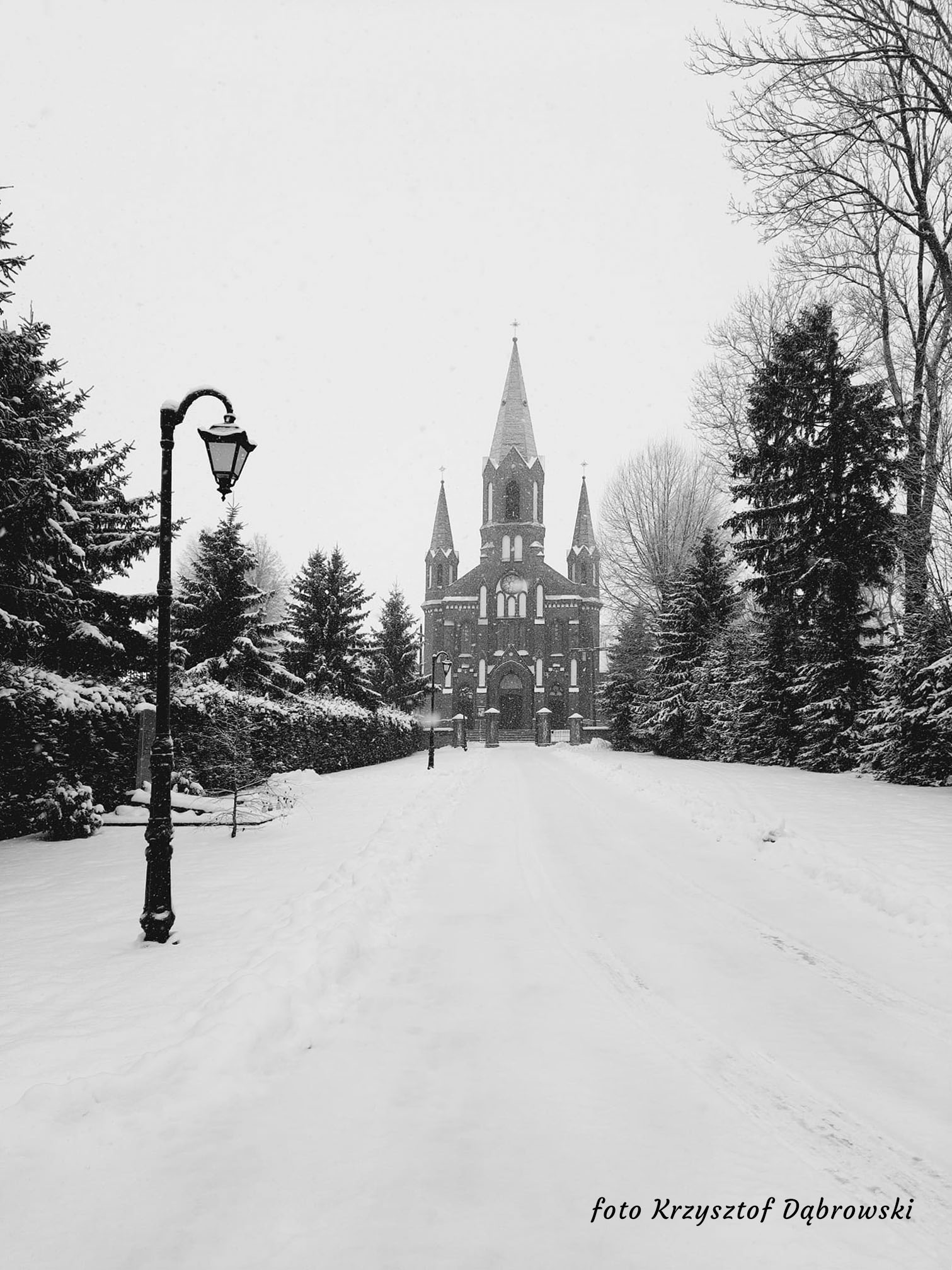

- Location within Poland
- Coordinates: 53°54′N 22°52′E
- Country: Poland
- Voivodeship: Podlaskie
- County: Augustów
- Gmina: Augustów
- Time zone: UTC+1 (CET)
  - Summer (DST): UTC+2 (CEST)
- Vehicle registration: BAU

Janówka [jaˈnufka]), is a village in the administrative district of Gmina Augustów, within Augustów County, Podlaskie Voivodeship, in north-eastern Poland.

== History ==
The local Catholic parish was founded in 1623 by Stanisław Rudomina Dusiacki. In 1827 Janówka had a population of 225.

Following the joint German-Soviet invasion of Poland, which started World War II in September 1939, the village was first occupied by the Soviet Union until 1941, and then by Germany until 1944. In 1941, the Germans carried out a massacre of 57 local Poles, including 10 children under the age of 14 (see Nazi crimes against the Polish nation).

== Notable people ==
- Romuald Kamiński (born 1955), bishop of Ełk
