= Kazimierz Romaniuk =

Polish Roman Catholic bishop (1927–2025)

- Bishop Emeritus of Warsaw-Praga
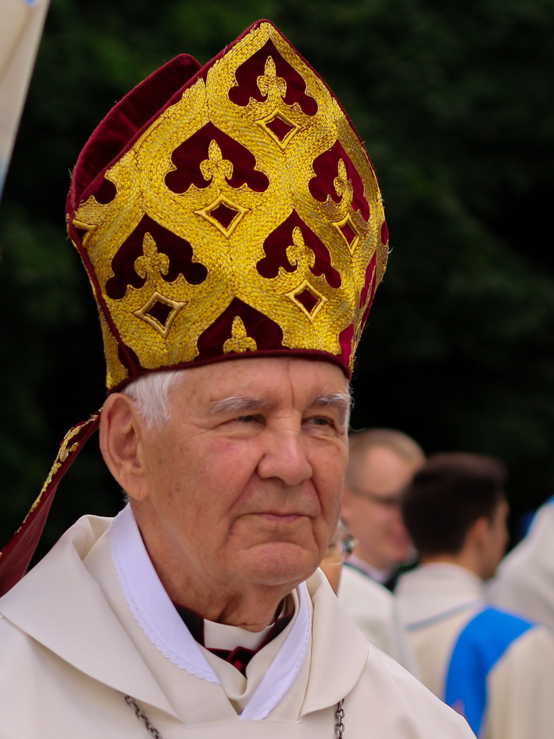
- Church: Roman Catholic Church
- Archdiocese: Warsaw
- See: Warsaw-Praga
- Appointed: 25 March 1992
- Term ended: 26 August 2004
- Predecessor: Position established
- Successor: Sławoj Leszek Głódź
- Previous posts: Auxiliary Bishop of Warsaw and Titular Bishop of Sicca Veneria (1982–1992)

Orders
- Ordination: 21 October 1951 by Zygmunt Choromański
- Consecration: 4 March 1982 by Józef Glemp
- Rank: Diocesan bishop

Personal details
- Born: 21 August 1927 Hołowienki, Poland
- Died: 25 February 2025 (aged 97) Warsaw, Poland
- Motto: In te confido
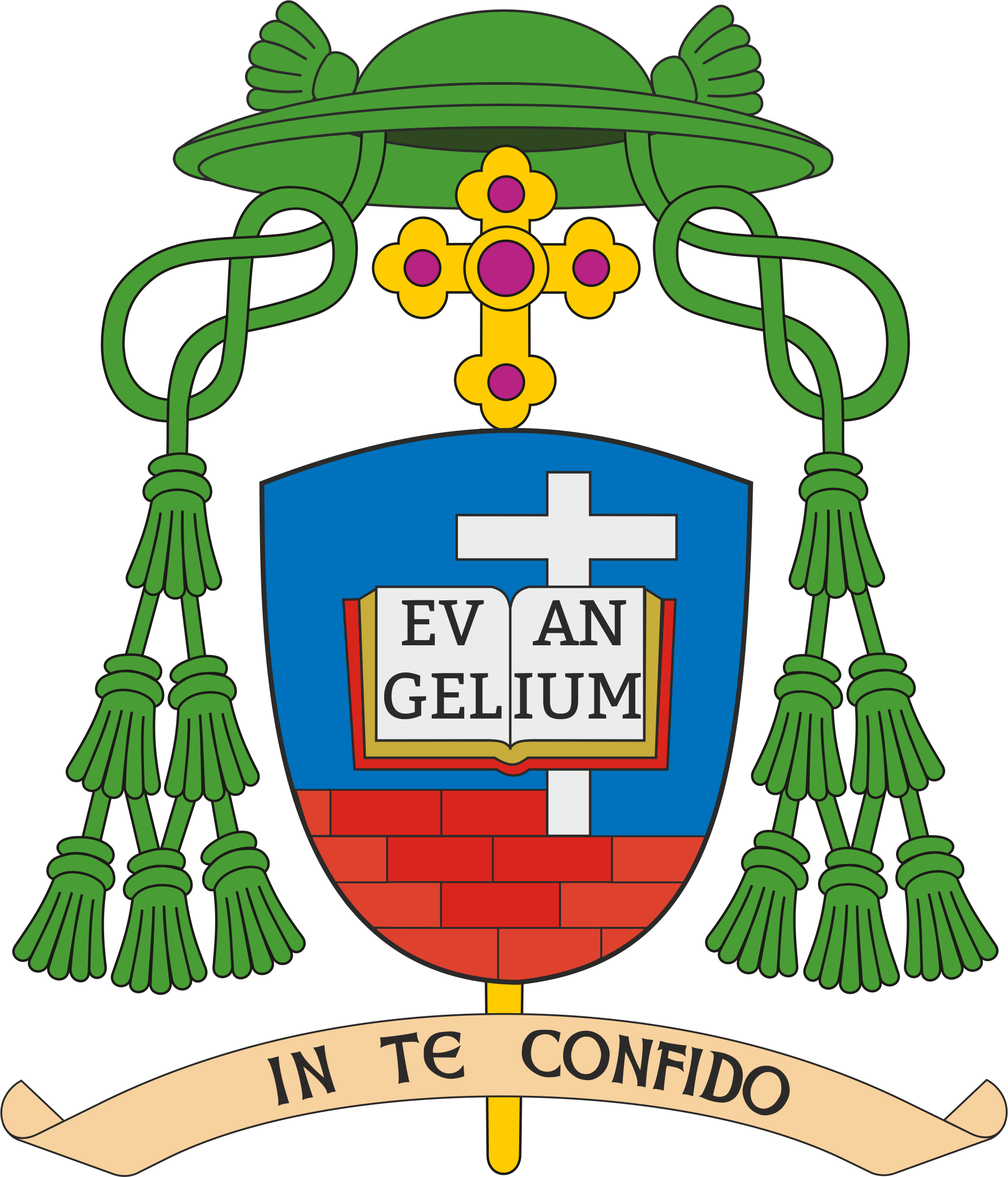
- Coat of arms

Styles of Kazimierz Romaniuk
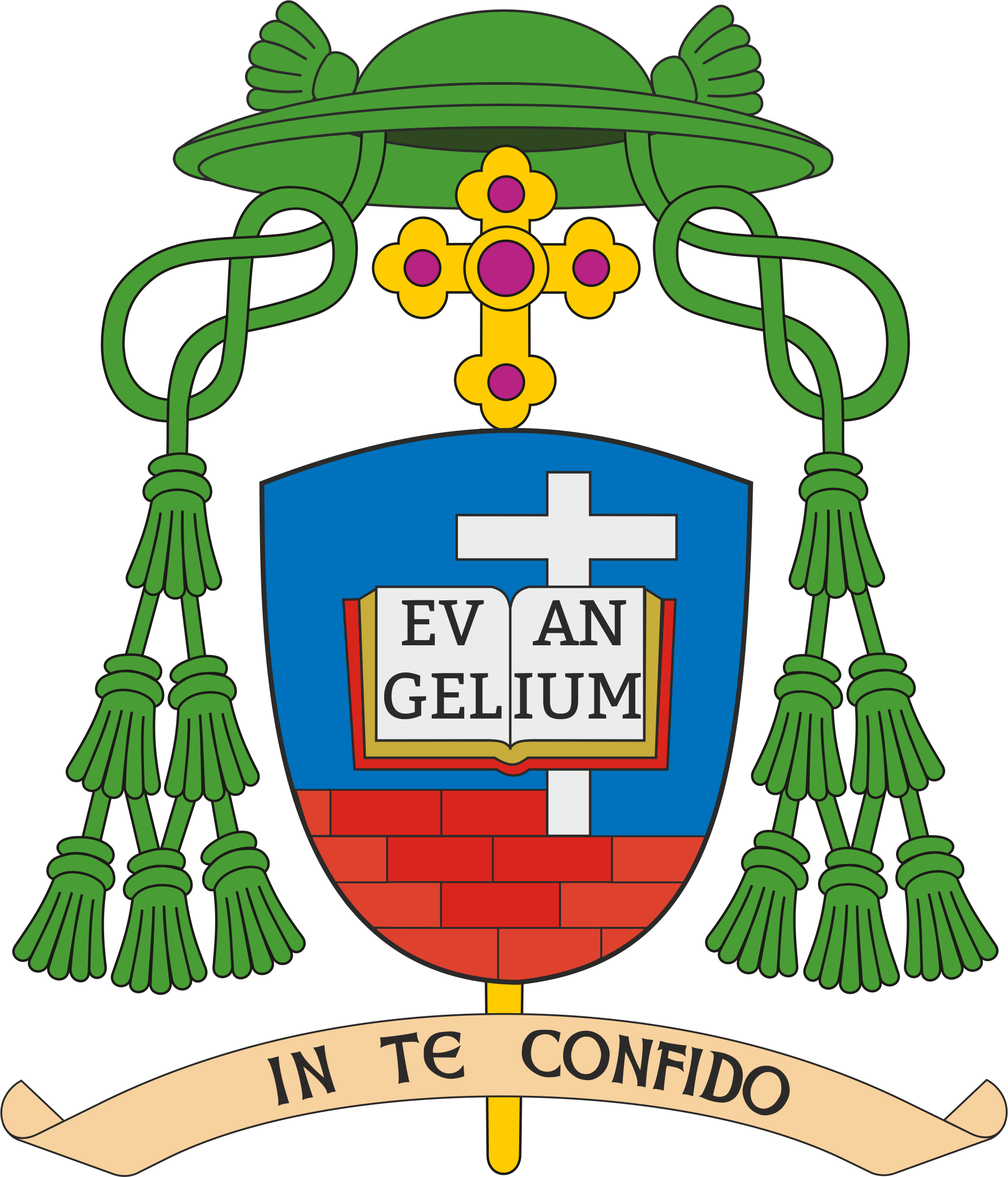
- Reference style: His Excellency; The Most Reverend
- Spoken style: Your Excellency
- Religious style: Bishop

Kazimierz Romaniuk (21 August 1927 – 25 February 2025) was a Polish Catholic prelate, professor of biblical studies and participant of the Warsaw Uprising. In 2004, Romaniuk became the bishop emeritus of the diocese of Warszawa-Praga. He was previously the rector of the Higher Metropolitan Seminary and the Academic Study of Catholic Theology in Warsaw (from 1971 to 1982), the auxiliary bishop of Warsaw (from 1982 to 1992), and the diocesan bishop of Warsaw-Praga (from 1992 to 2004).

== Early life and education ==
Romaniuk was born on 21 August 1927, in Hołowienki. During the occupation of Poland in World War II, he studied at the clandestine secondary school "Future" in Warsaw, where he graduated in 1944 with a small matura. He took part in the Warsaw Uprising. After that failed, he was interned in a camp in Pruszków, from which he fled. By the end of the occupation, he was still in hiding, and was educated in the School of Humanities. He then studied at the Adam Mickiewicz Institute in Warsaw, where in 1946, he passed the matura.

From 1946 to 1951, Romaniuk studied philosophy and theology at the theological faculty of the University of Warsaw and obtained a master's degree. At the same time, he gained priestly formation at the Major Metropolitan Seminary in Warsaw. He was ordained as a subdeacon on 21 October 1951, by the Auxiliary Bishop of Warsaw Zygmunt Choromański, and was ordained a deacon on 11 November 1951, by Wacław Majewski, the auxiliary bishop of Warsaw. His ordination to the priesthood was on 16 December 1951, in the Church of the Purest Heart of Mary in Warsaw by Archbishop Stefan Wyszyński. In 1953, he earned a doctorate from the faculty of theology at the University of Warsaw in the field of theological sciences and patrology on the basis of his dissertation about St. Jerome and Rufinus of Aquileia. He further studied from 1956 to 1958 at the Pontifical Biblical Institute in Rome, earning a bachelor's degree in biblical studies, and at the École Biblique in Jerusalem from 1959 to 1961, where after the submission of the work Love of the Father and the Son in the Holy soteriology, he received his doctorate. He habilitated in 1966, based on the idea of hearing the fear of God in the theology of St. Paul. In 1969, he received the title of professor, and in 1971 a professor of biblical sciences (approved by the Congregation for Catholic Education in 1981).

== Priesthood and academia ==
Romaniuk worked as a curate in the parish of St. Stephen Raszyn (1951–1952) and in the parish of Our Lady in Warsaw, where he also served as the prefect (1952–1955). In 1973 he was named as the prelate of His Holiness, and in 1979, he was appointed canon of the metropolitan chapter of Warsaw.

From 1953 to 1956, Romaniuk worked first as an assistant and then assistant professor at the faculty of theology of the University of Warsaw, conducting classes in the Latin church and patrology. From 1955 to 1956 and again from 1961 to 1963, he served as prefect of studies at the Major Metropolitan Seminary in Warsaw. In the same seminar, from 1954 to 1956, he taught Latin church and patrology, and, from 1961 to 1984, exegesis of the New Testament of the Latin and French Church. From 1971 to 1982, he held the office of the rector of the Higher Metropolitan Seminary and at the same time the Academic Study of Catholic Theology in Warsaw. From 1962 to 1976, he taught scripture at the Catholic University of Lublin, first as an assistant professor, and after 1966, as a docent. At this university, from 1966 to 1976, he was head of the Department of Biblical Theology of the New Testament. In 1966, he took lectures in prime study of internal life in Warsaw. From 1970 to 1972, he was an assistant professor at the faculty of theology of the Society of Jesus "Bobolanum" in Warsaw, and from 1976 to 1983, was an assistant professor, then professor, in the Department of the Biblical New Testament at the Cardinal Stefan Wyszyński University in Warsaw.

In 1966 Romaniuk became a member of the International Association of New Testament Studiorum Society. From 1975 to 1978, he was a member of the executive committee of that body. He also became a member of the committee of the Polish Episcopal Conference in the Science, Scientific Council and Committee Seminars. He made an independent translation of the Bible from its original language, which was published under the title The Bible of Warsaw-Praga. He participated in the preparation of the ecumenical translation of the New Testament and Psalms.

== Episcopacy ==
On 20 February 1982, Pope John Paul II appointed Romaniuk as auxiliary bishop of the Archdiocese of Warsaw and the titular bishop of El Kef. He was ordained as a bishop on 4 March 1982, in St. John's Archcathedral in Warsaw.. He was consecrated by Archbishop Józef Glemp, accompanied by Cardinal Franciszek Macharski and Bishop Władysław Miziołek. He adopted the episcopal motto "In Te Confido".. From 1982 to 1992, he held the office of vicar of the archdiocese. In the metropolitan curia, he served as chairman of the Department of General Administration and Financial Affairs.

On 25 March 1992, as a result of the reorganization of the administrative divisions in the Church of Poland, Pope John Paul II moved Romaniuk's offices of diocesan bishop to the newly created Diocese of Warsaw-Praga. He was part of the inauguration of Ingres's St. Florian's Cathedral held in Warsaw on 12 April 1992, and the Co-Cathedral of Our Lady Victorious in Warsaw on 24 May 1992. In 1998–2000, he conducted a diocesan synod. In 1999, he visited the diocese of Pope John Paul II during his apostolic nuncio to Poland. On 26 August, John Paul II accepted his resignation from his duties as the diocesan Bishop of Warsaw-Prague.

Romaniuk served as the vice-president of the committee of the Polish Episcopal Conference. A publishing Catholic, he became a member of the Scientific Committee, Catholic Science Committee and Seminaries. He was also chairman of the subcommittee of scripture. Furthermore, he became part of the co Joint Commission and the Faculties of the Papal Subcommittee of State-Church Affairs, Seminars and the State Commission for Codification, and Law on Higher Education. In 1965 he became a member of the Episcopal representative of the World Federation of Biblical Apostolate, in which he, from 1971 to 1977, served as a board member.

Romaniuk ordained, as an auxiliary bishop: Marian Duś (1986), Stanisław Kędziora (1987), Piotr Jarecki (1994), Tadeusz Pikus (1999), Józef Górzyński (2013) and Rafał Markowski (2013). As the auxiliary bishop of Gniezno, he ordained Jerzy Dąbrowski (1982), as the auxiliary bishop of Ełk, Romuald Kamiński (2005), and as the auxiliary bishop of Warszawa-Praga, Marek Solarczyk (2011).

== Death ==
Romaniuk died in Warsaw on 25 February 2025, at the age of 97.

== Titles and awards ==
Romaniuk was given honorary citizenship in the cities of Otwock (1994), Radzymin (1997), Mińsk Mazowiecki (2001), and Warsaw (2008).

In 1991 Romaniuk was awarded by the Polish Translators Association, and the 2005 prize by the Phoenix Association of Catholic Publishers.

Catholic Church titles
Preceded by Position established	Bishop of Warszawa-Praga; 1992–2004	Succeeded by Sławoj Leszek Głódź
Preceded by Felix Eugenio Mkhori	Titular Bishop of Sicca Veneria; 1982–1992	Succeeded by Lajos Varga
Preceded by —	Auxiliary Bishop of Warsaw; 1982–1992	Succeeded by —
