= Sławoj Leszek Głódź =

Polish prelate of the Catholic Church (born 1945)

His Excellency Sławoj Leszek Głódź
- Archbishop of Gdańsk
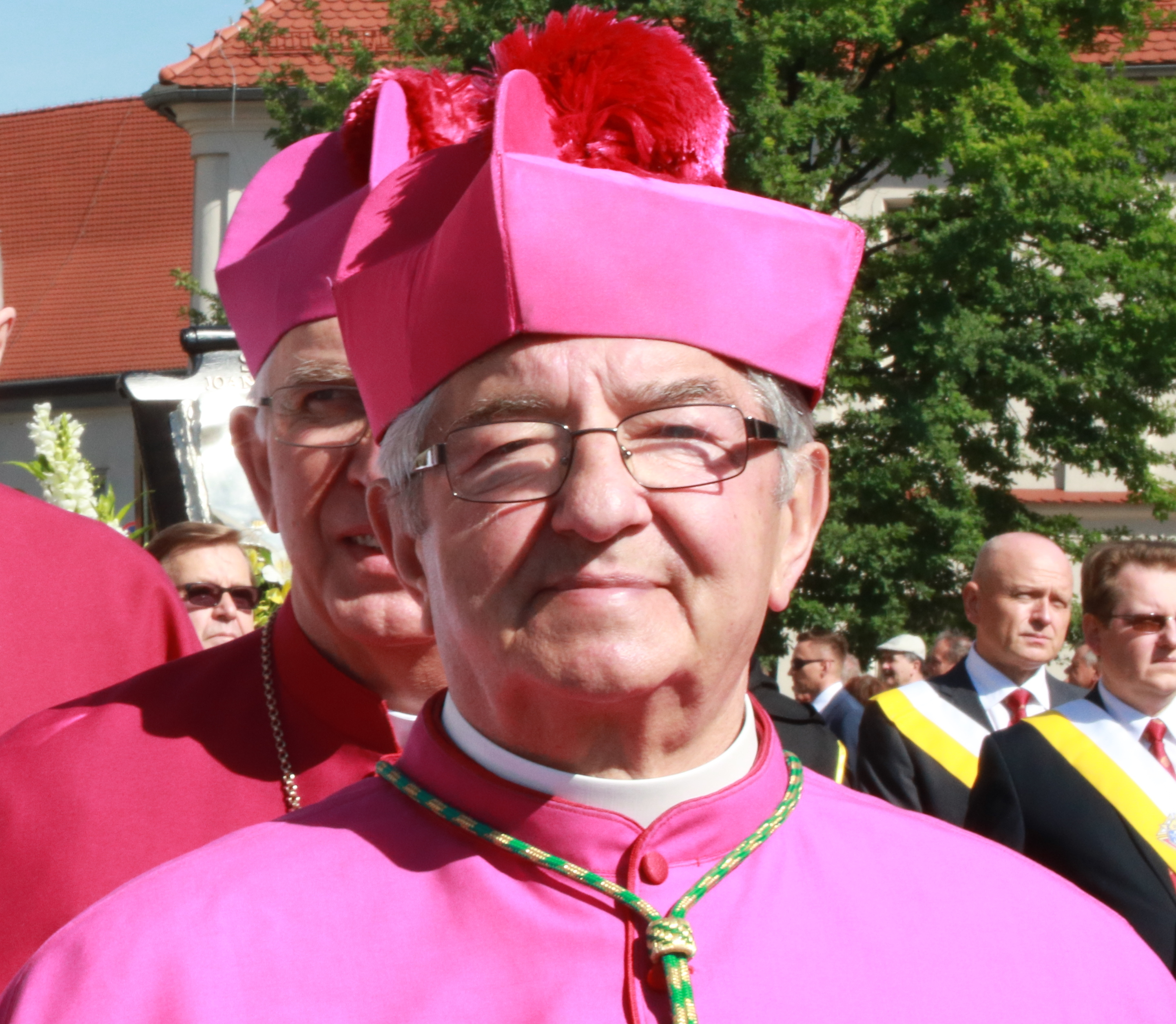
- Głódź in 2018
- Church: Roman Catholic Church
- Archdiocese: Gdańsk
- Province: Gdańsk
- Metropolis: Gdańsk
- Appointed: 17 April 2008
- Installed: 26 April 2008
- Term ended: 13 August 2020
- Predecessor: Tadeusz Gocłowski
- Successor: Tadeusz Wojda
- Previous post: Bishop of Military Ordinariate of Poland (1991–2004) Bishop of Warszawa-Praga (2004–2008) Titular Bishop of Bettonium(1991–1998)

Orders
- Ordination: 14 June 1970 by Henryk Gulbinowicz
- Consecration: 23 February 1991 by Józef Glemp
- Rank: Archbishop

Personal details
- Born: 13 August 1945 (age 81) Bobrówka, Mońki County, Poland
- Education: Archdiocesan Higher Theological Seminary in Bialystok Institut Catholique de Paris John Paul II Catholic University of Lublin Pontifical Oriental Institute
- Motto: Milito pro Christo (I fight for Christ)
- Coat of arms: Sławoj Leszek Głódź's coat of arms

Styles of Sławoj Leszek Głódź
- Reference style: His Excellency; The Most Reverend
- Spoken style: Your Excellency
- Religious style: Archbishop

(Bishop) General Sławoj Leszek Głódź
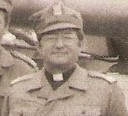
- Bishop General Sławoj Leszek Głódź (1991)
- Military career
- Service years: 1966-68 1991-2004
- Rank: Generał Dywizji
- Unit: 32 Budziszyński Mechanized Regiment 5 Sappers Brigade Military Ordinariate of Poland
- Awards: Commander's Cross with Star Order of Polonia Restituta Officers Cross Knight Commander with Star Conventual Chaplain ad honorem

Sławoj Leszek Głódź (born 13 August 1945) is a Polish prelate of the Catholic Church who served as Archbishop of Gdańsk from 2008 to 2020. He has been a bishop since 1991 and before that spent a decade working in the Roman Curia.

== Early life and Priesthood ==
He was born in Bobrówka on 13 August 1945. He entered the major seminary of Białystok in 1964, however due to the communist regime in Poland he had to interrupt his studies between 1966 and 1968, as the mandatory military service in clerical companies. During his service he obtained the specialization of a sapper of Pontoons. He completed his priestly formation and was ordained a priest on 14 June 1970. Between He continued his studies on canon law at the Catholic University of Lublin and the Pontifical Oriental Institute, where he earned a doctorate in eastern canon law in 1980.

From 1981 to 1991 he worked in Rome in the offices of the Congregation for the Oriental Churches, where he received the dignity of a prelate in 1984.

== Bishop ==
Pope John Paul II appointed him titular bishop of Bettonium and the Bishop of the newly re-created Military Ordinary of Poland on 21 January 1991. He received his episcopal consecration from Cardinal Józef Glemp on 23 February 1991 in the Jasna Góra Basilica in Częstochowa. On 18 April 1991 he was appointed to the rank of General of the Brigade, and on 11 November 1993 to the rank of Divisional general. During the office of the bishop, he reconstructed the diocesan structures of the Ordinariate, establishing a network of military parishes across Poland. He also established two new distinctions of the Ordinariate: in 1995 the diploma "Benemerenti" and in 2001 the medal "Milito pro Christo".

Ordination history of Sławoj Leszek Głódź
History
Priestly ordination
- Ordained by: Henryk Gulbinowicz
Episcopal consecration
- Principal consecrator: Józef Glemp
- Co-consecrators: Franciszek Macharski; Henryk Gulbinowicz
Episcopal succession
Bishops consecrated by Sławoj Leszek Głódź as principal consecrator
- Wiesław Śmigiel: 21 April 2012
- Zbigniew Zieliński: 24 October 2015

On 17 July 2004, John Paul raised him to the personal rank of archbishop (ad personam) and on 26 August appointed him Bishop of the Roman Catholic Diocese of Warszawa-Praga.

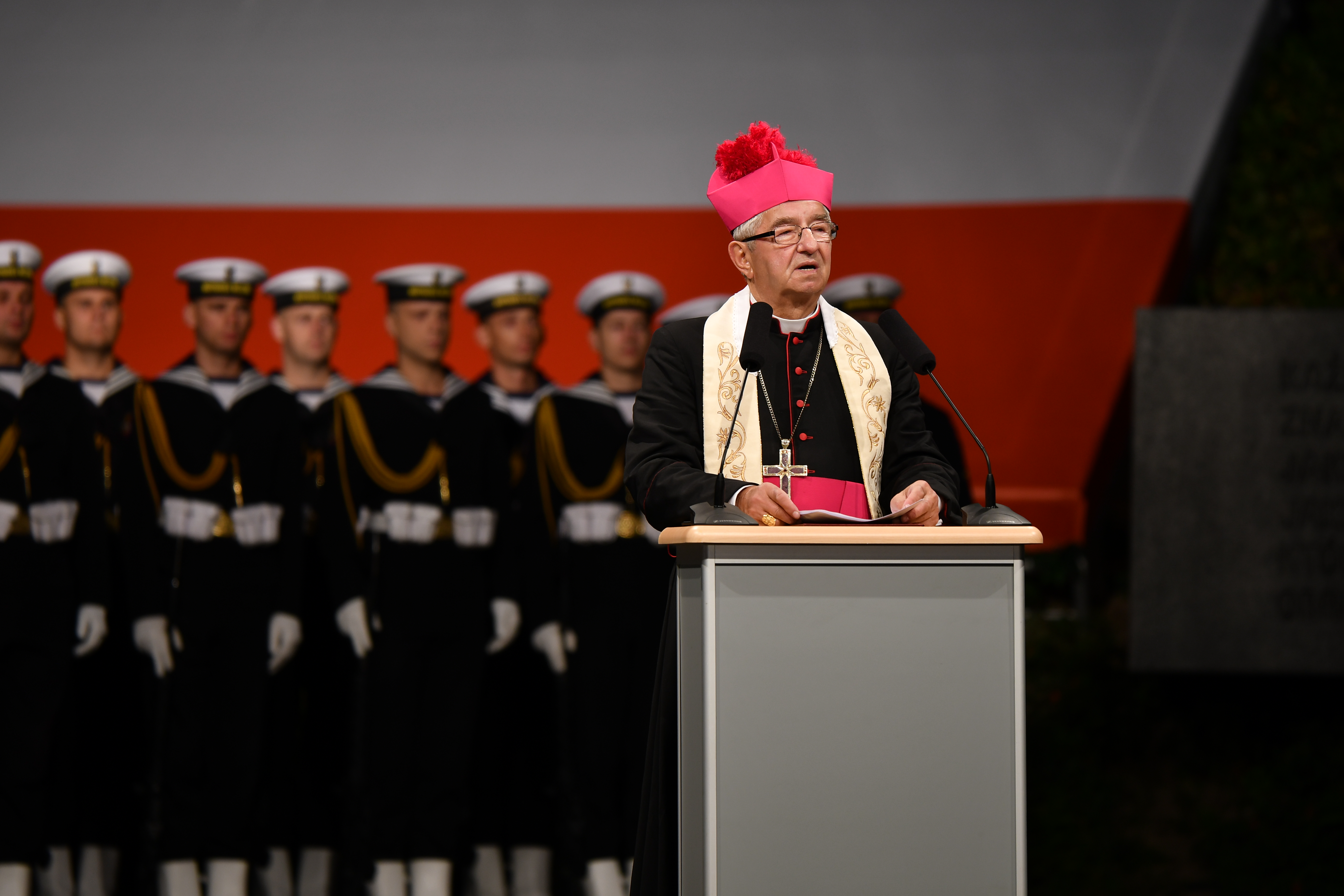
79th anniversary of the outbreak of World War II

On 17 April 2008, Pope Benedict XVI named him Archbishop of Gdańsk. His ingress to the Archcathedral of the Holy Trinity in Gdańsk-Oliwa, during which he canonically took office, took place on 26 April 2008. On 29 June 2008 he received the metropolitan pallium from the Pope in Rome. Lech Wałęsa and others protested his appointment calling it a "punishment" for the city in light of his defense of an anti-Semitic radio station and his opposition to the European Union.

In 2013, the Polish weekly magazine Wprost published an article in which the accounts of anonymous people from the surroundings of the Archbishop were presented, accusing him of humiliation and intimidation of subordinates, mobbing and the organization of alcoholic libations.

== Controversy ==
In May 2019, a documentary film called Tell No One about sexual abuse of minors committed by Polish priests became available on the internet and depicted Głódź as both indifferent to victims and praising a prominent priest accused as a sexual predator. Asked to comment on the film, he said: "I don't watch any old thing." He then issued a statement that said: "I did not intend to offend victims of sexual abuse with my words, and I am sorry." Some local clergy called for him to resign. In 2019, three protestors toppled a statue of Henryk Jankowski following revelations that he sexually abused Barbara Borowiecka when she was a girl. Jankowski, who in 2004 had been the subject of an inconclusive criminal investigation involving the sexual abuse of a boy, had been defrocked in 2005. He died in 2010 without ever being convicted of sex abuse. Personal chaplain to Lech Wałęsa, Rev. Franciszek Cybula, had been accused of committing acts of sex abuse as well.

== Resignation ==
Pope Francis accepted Glodz's resignation as Archbishop of Gdańsk on his 75th birthday, 13 August 2020, after reports that he had covered up abuse committed by Jankowski and Cybula. Because of the timing, the move was described as "cleaning house". Glodz had also presided at Cybula's funeral.

On 2 June 2020, the Congregation for Bishops ordered Kazimierz Nycz, Archbishop of Warsaw, to conduct an investigation; it was concluded by 5 November 2020. In March 2021, Glodz was sanctioned by the Vatican and ordered to live outside his former diocese, and told he could not participate in public liturgies or non-religious gatherings within the territory of the diocese.

Catholic Church titles
Preceded by Józef Gawlina	Military Ordinariate of Poland; 1991-2004	Succeeded by Tadeusz Płoski
Preceded by Kazimierz Romaniuk	Bishop of Warszawa-Praga; 2004-2008	Succeeded by Henryk Hoser
Preceded by Tadeusz Gocłowski	Archbishop of Gdańsk; 2008-2020	Succeeded by Tadeusz Wojda
