= Day of Prayers for Prisoners =

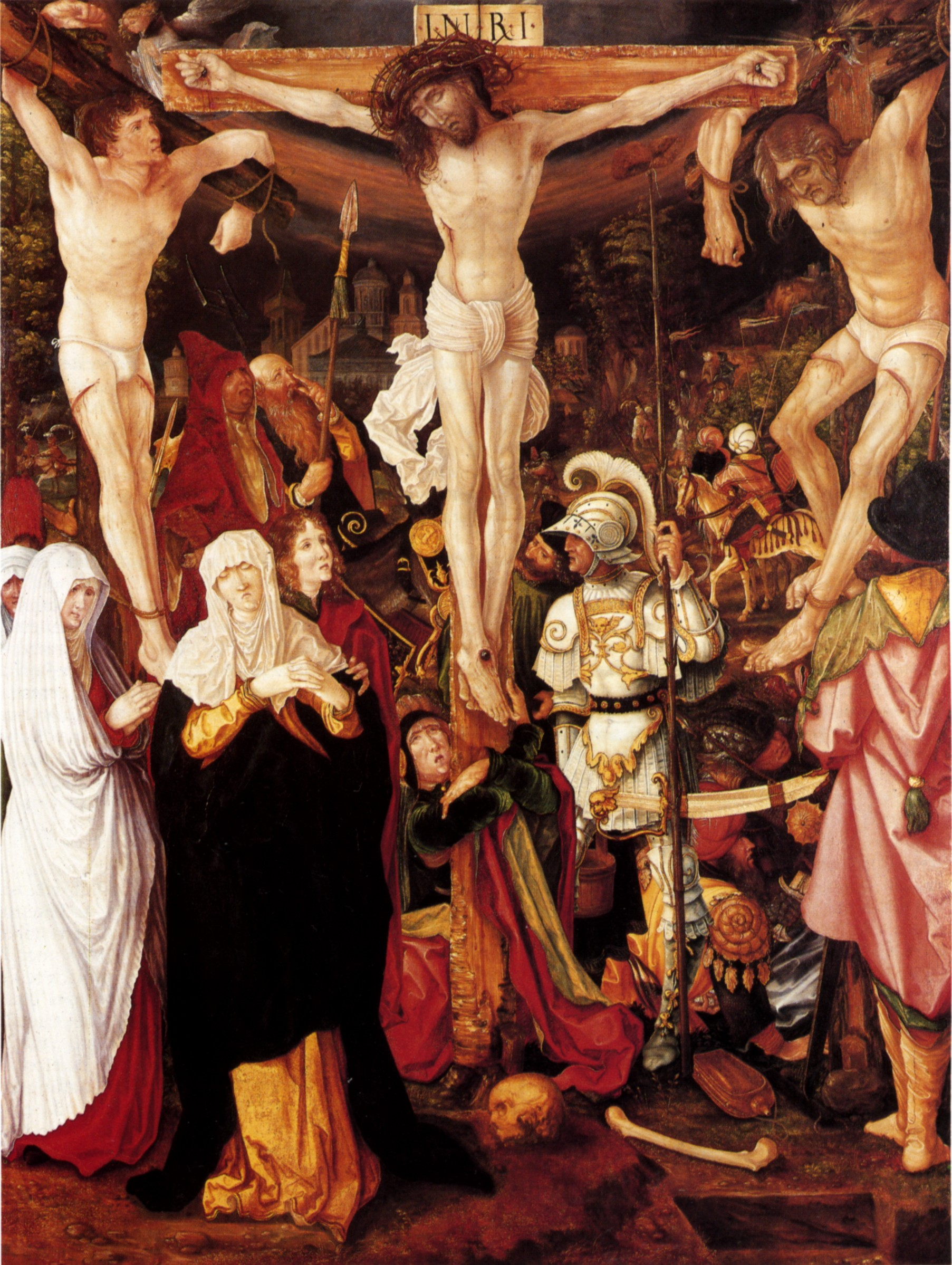
Crucifixion of Jesus with the Penitent Thief and the impenitent thief (central image of the Bockstorfer Altar in the Cathedral of Konstanz, painted in 1524)

Day of Prayers for Prisoners is a Polish Catholic holiday celebrated every year on 26 March, established at the Polish Episcopal Conference during the 347th Plenary Meeting of Episcopate (10-11 March 2009). This is also the Memorial Day of Penitent Thief (known also as Good Thief), a patron of prisoners.

The initiative of establishing the new holiday came from the Association of Evangelical Help for Prisoners "Prison Brotherhood" in Warsaw, represented by its founder, Rev. Jan Sikorski, and the Polish Prison Chaplain-General, Rev. Paweł Wojtas (who was then vice-president of the International Commission of Catholic Prison Pastoral Care).

On this day for many years, the Prison Brotherhood organized a pilgrimage of prisoners' representatives to the Jasna Góra Monastery in Częstochowa, the major Polish Marian sanctuary. The idea behind establishing the Day of Prayers for Prisoners is a need to pray for all prisoners, but especially for those who disassociate themselves entirely from God, who do not see any point in conversion or have lost their faith in Divine Mercy. Pope John Paul II during his fourth pastoral visit to Poland in 1991, visited the prison in Płock and said: You have been sentenced, that is true, but you are not condemned. Each of you can, with the help of God's grace, become a saint.

In 2016, the Association of Evangelical Help for Prisoners "Prison Brotherhood" was dissolved and replaced by the Prison Brotherhood Association Samarytania in Bydgoszcz, while Rev. Jan Sikorski became its Honorary Member.

== See also ==
- Day of Prayer
