= St. Florian's Cathedral =

Gothic Revival cathedral in Warsaw, Poland

Coordinates: 52°15′6″N 21°1′51″E

- Cathedral of St. Michael the Archangel and St. Florian the Martyr
- Katedra Świętego Michała Archanioła i Świętego Floriana
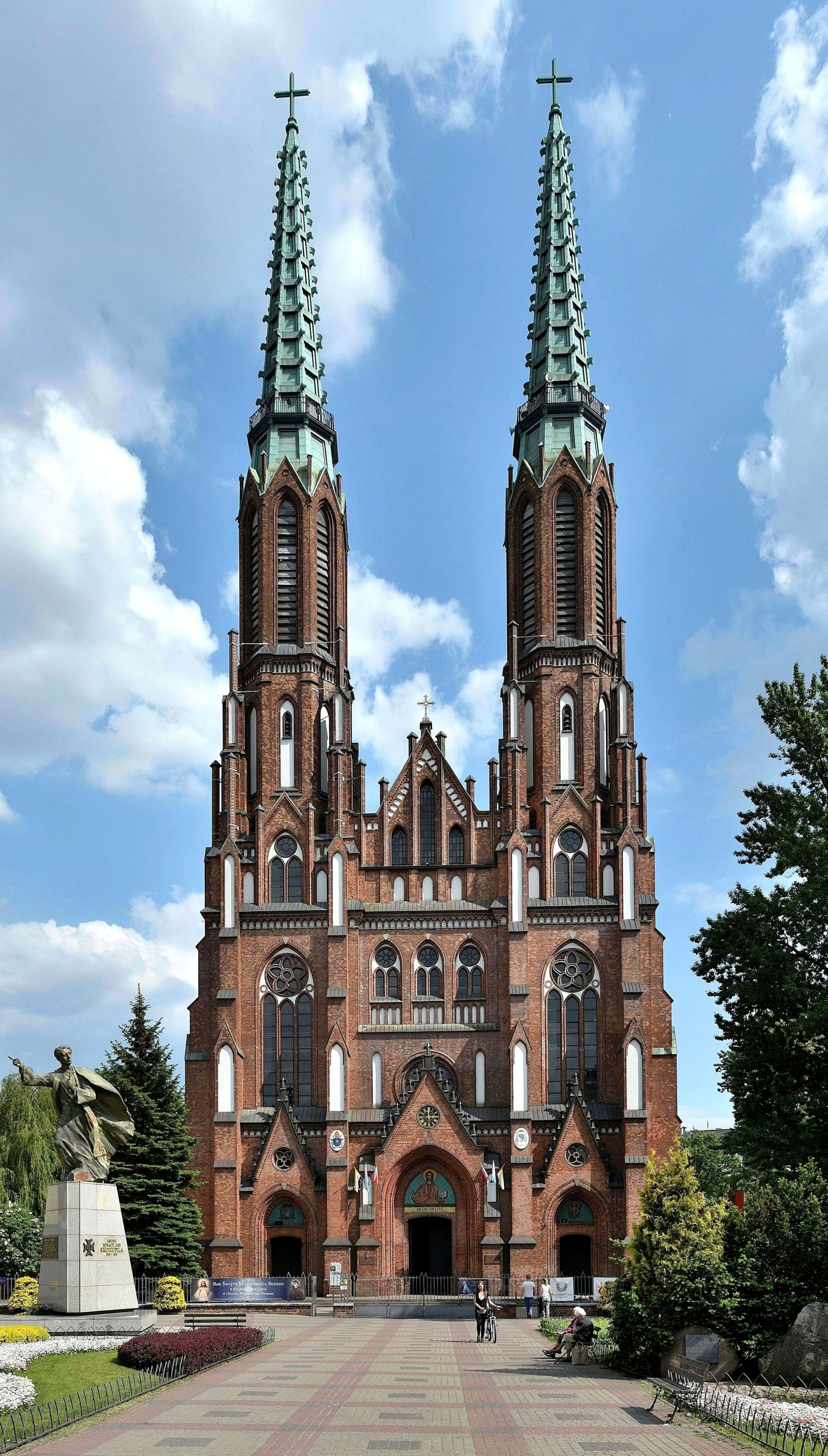
- St. Florian's Cathedral
- Location: Praga, Warsaw
- Country: Poland
- Language: Polish
- Denomination: Catholic
- Tradition: Roman Rite
- Website: St. Florian's Cathedral

History
- Status: Minor basilica
- Dedication: Saint Florian, Saint Michael the Archangel
- Consecrated: 29 September 1901

Architecture
- Functional status: Active
- Architect: Józef Pius Dziekoński
- Architectural type: Cathedral
- Style: Gothic Revival
- Years built: 1888–1904, 1972 (rebuilt)
- Construction cost: ₽300 000
- Demolished: 14 September 1944

Specifications
- Capacity: 8000
- Materials: Brick

Administration
- Diocese: Warszawa-Praga

St. Florian's Cathedral, more formally known as the Cathedral of St. Michael the Archangel and St. Florian the Martyr (Polish: Katedra Świętego Michała Archanioła i Świętego Floriana), is a Roman Catholic church and minor basilica, dedicated to St. Florian. The church is located at 3 Floriańska Street in Praga-Północ district of Warsaw.

== History ==
There has been a Catholic church presence in or around the site of the future church since 1583. However, the impetus for creating a lasting church did not arrive until the late 19th century, when Poland was not an independent country. The map of Europe was redrawn during the 1815 Congress of Vienna and the resulting territorial maneuvers placed the French Duchy of Warsaw under the control of the Russian Empire, transforming it into the Congress Poland. Among other intrusions, over twenty Russian Orthodox churches were built in Congress Poland. To protest against the perceived imposition of a foreign church, and in direct reaction to the monumental Orthodox Church of Mary Magdalene built down the street, St Florian’s was built with two commanding 75-meter (246 ft) towers between 1897–1904.

The church is named after St. Florian, the patron saint of professions associated with fire, such as firefighters, steelworkers, chimney sweeps, potters and bakers.

== World War II destruction ==
During and after the Siege of Warsaw, churches were used as a hiding place for Jews, the Warszawa Army and as a general refuge for civilians. St. Florian's was destroyed by the Germans as they withdrew from Poland in 1944 after the Warsaw Uprising. The church remained in ruins for several years, but by the 1950s a reconstruction effort slowly began with support from Praga residents. The rebuilt church was reopened in 1972.

== Role in church hierarchy ==
St Florian's is the cathedral church of the Roman Catholic Diocese of Warszawa-Praga and by order of the Holy See was raised to the rank of minor basilica in 1992. Over four hundred priests form the ministry in this diocese covering 1,274 square miles, divided into 160 parishes and serving approximately one million Polish Catholics.

== Notable features ==
St Florian's is built in a Gothic Revival style distinguished by two twenty-story towers facing Aleja „Solidarności” (English: Solidarity Avenue), capped with bronze spires. Most of its exterior is made of red brick. Over the entrances are mosaic depictions of Jesus Christ and the emblem of the first bishop of Warszawa-Praga diocese, Kazimierz Romaniuk, while the interior is decorated in red or white plaster and brick.

== See also ==
- Places of worship in Warsaw
- National Temple of Divine Providence
- St. Florian's Church, Kraków

== Gallery ==
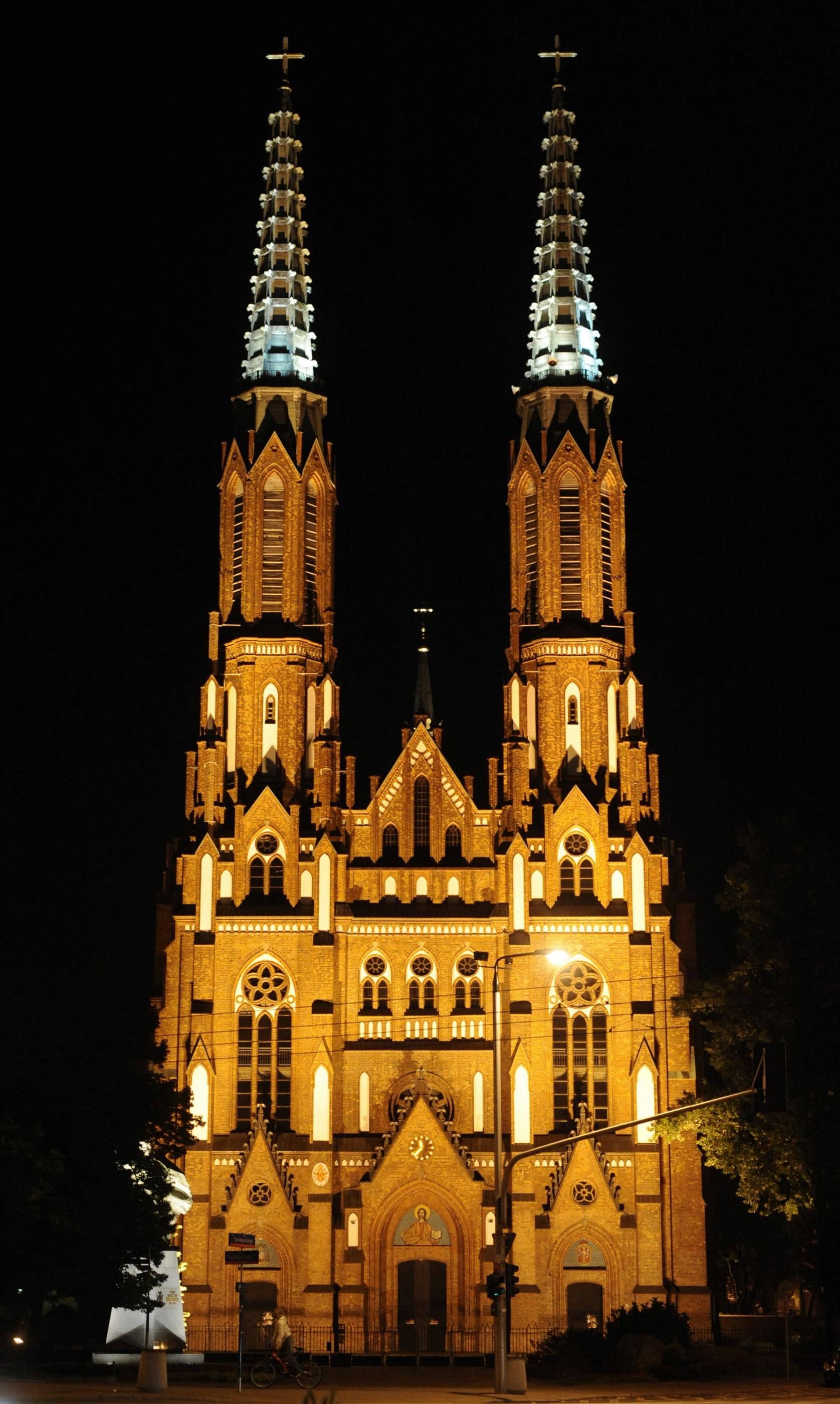

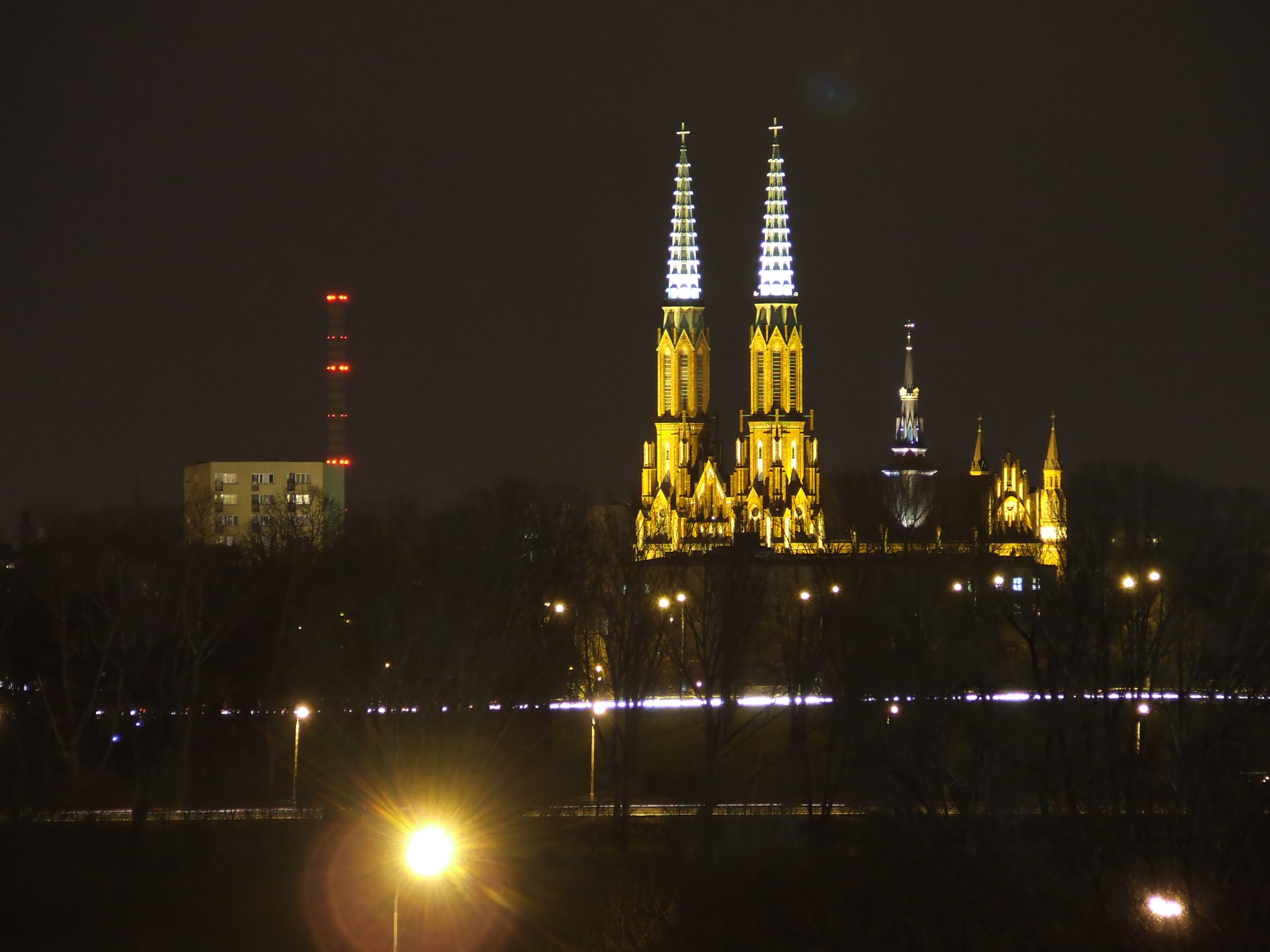

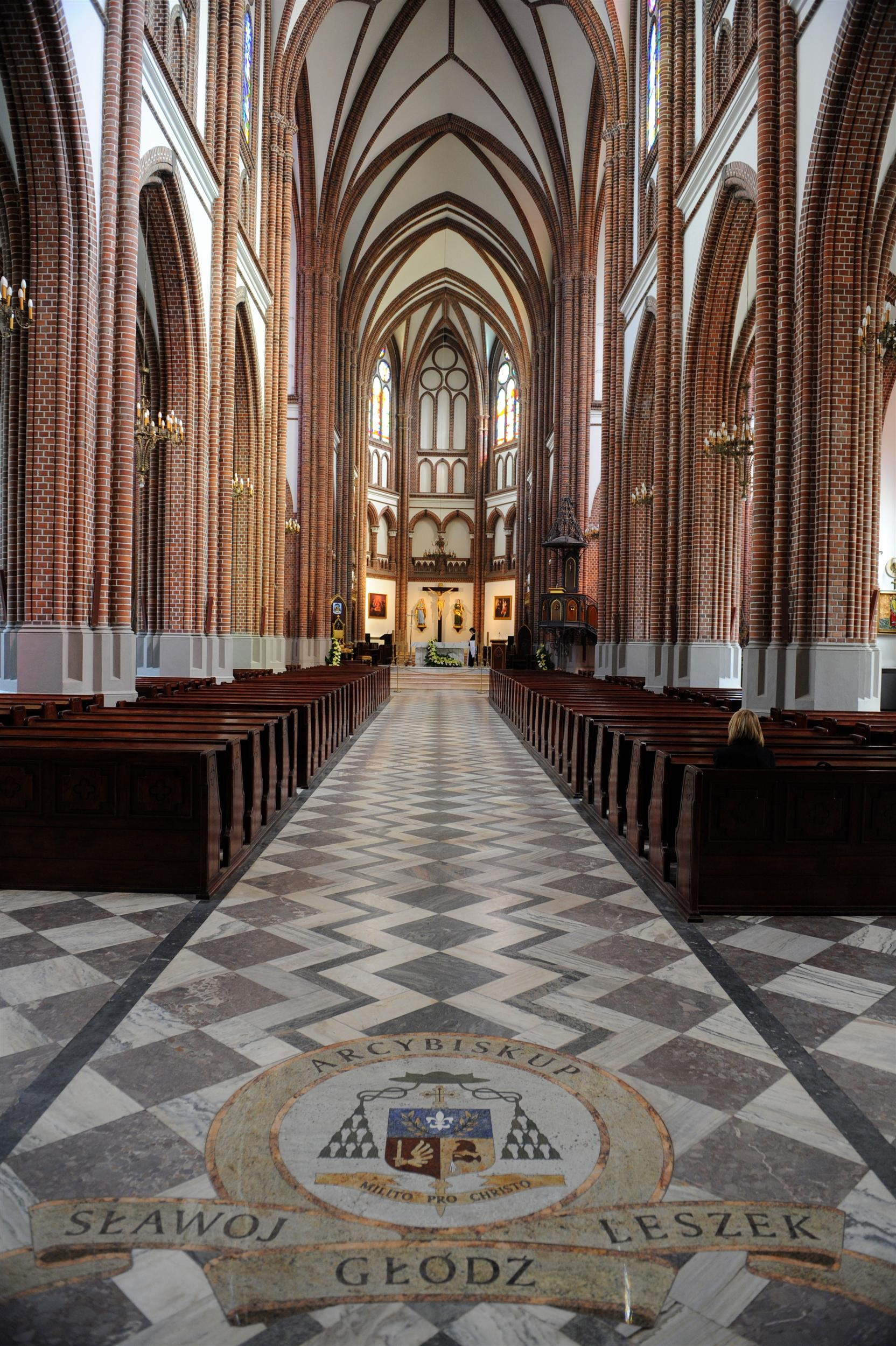

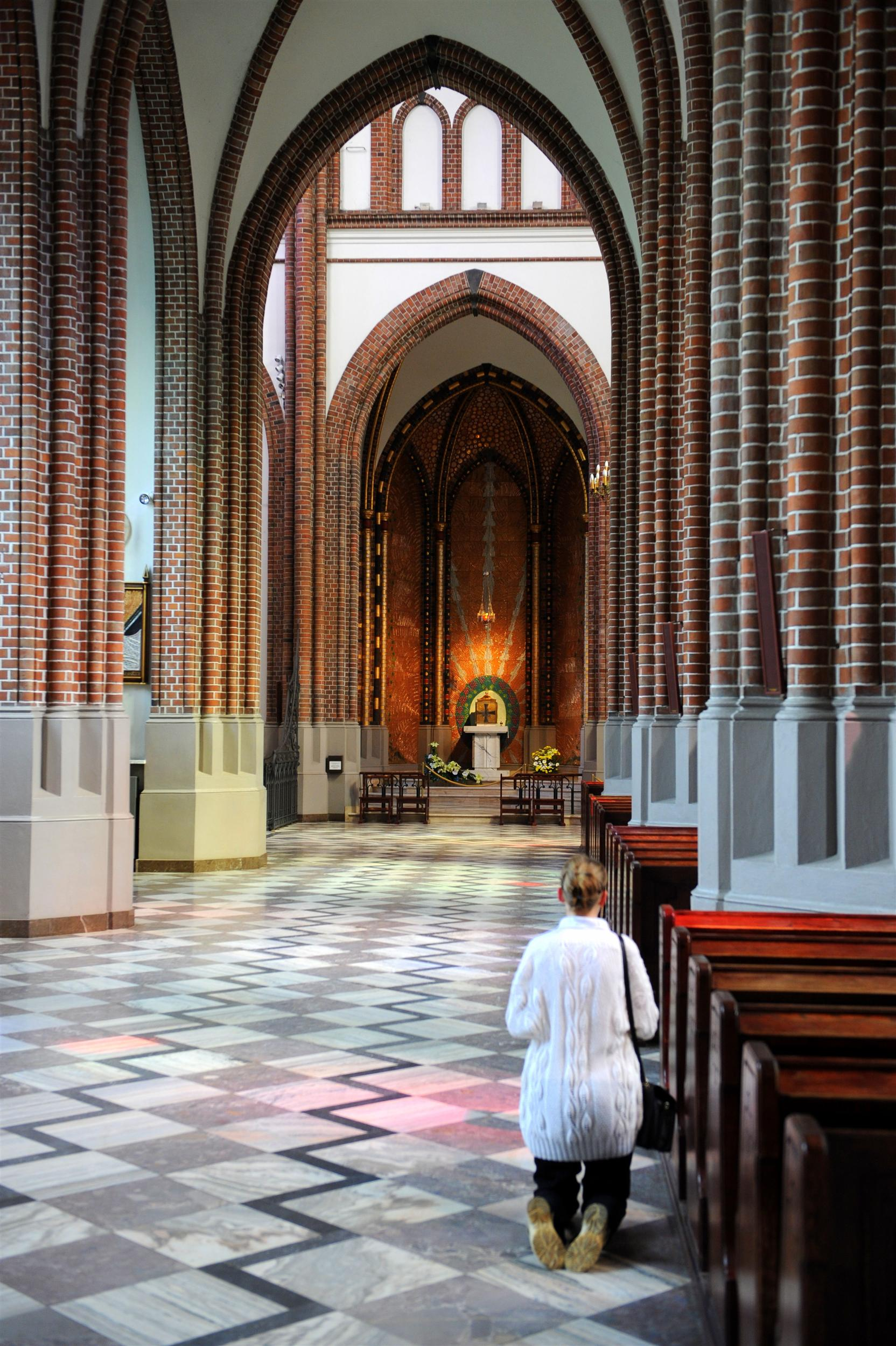

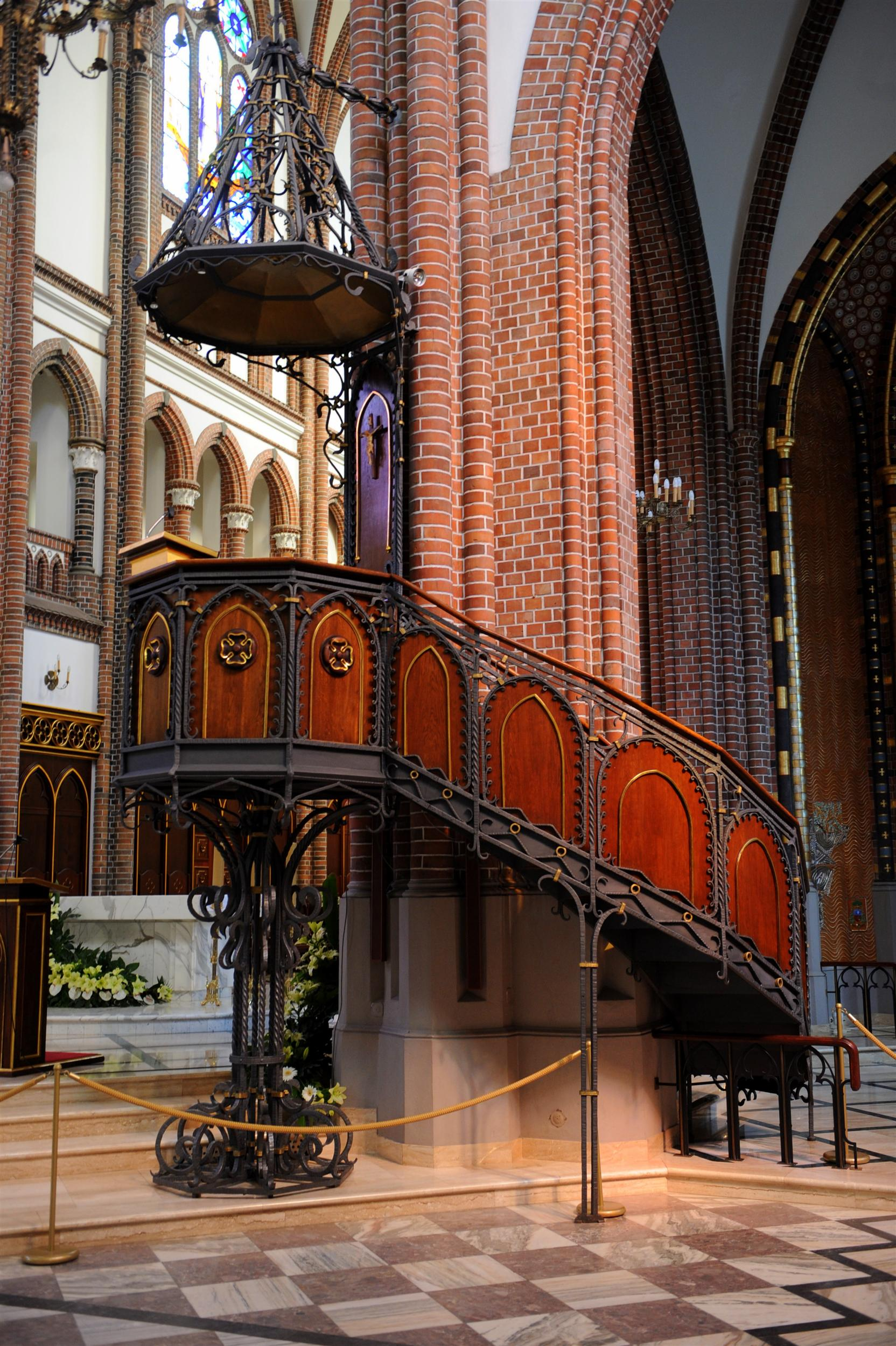

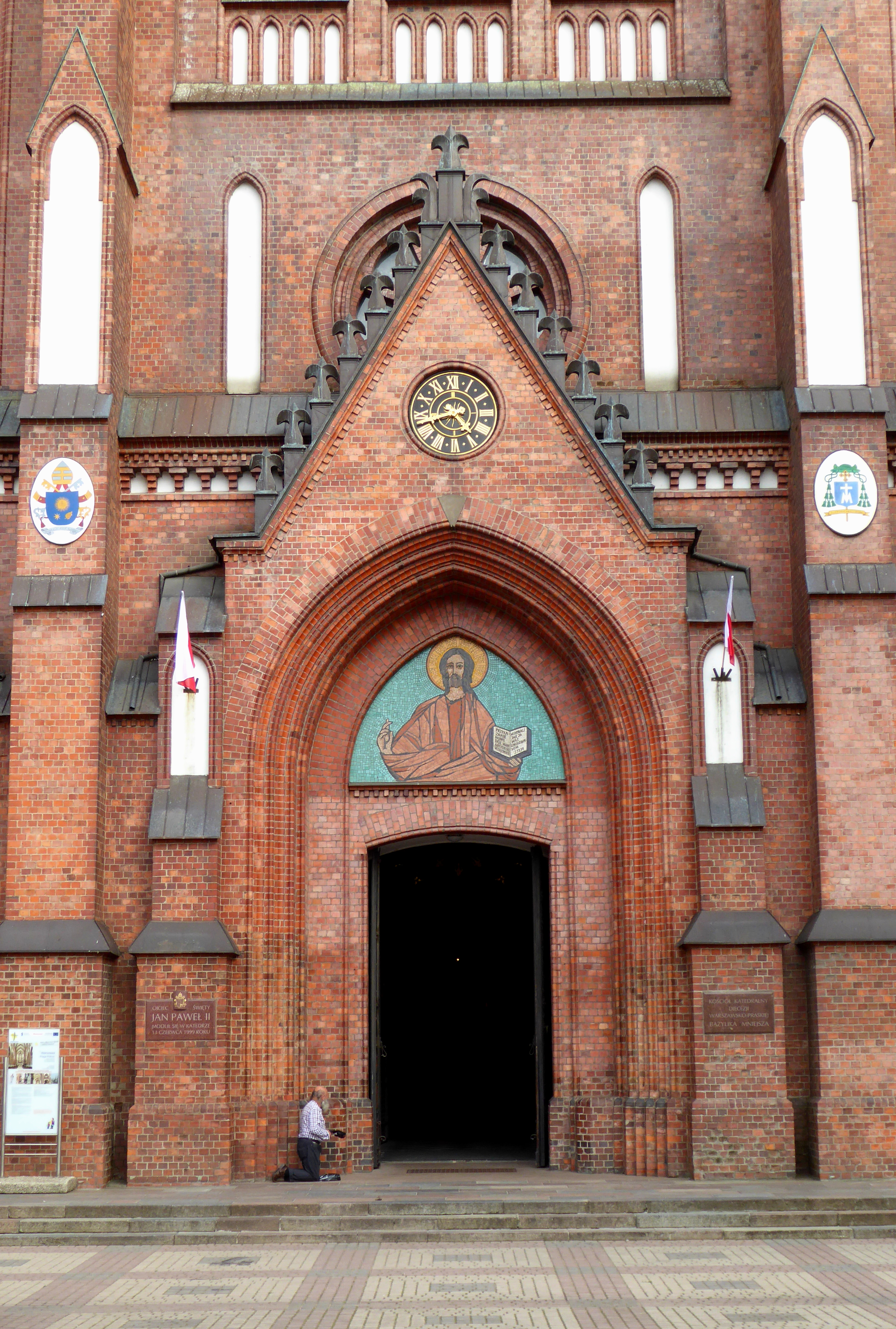
