= Bobrówka, Mońki County =

Bobrówka
- Village
- Location within Poland
- Coordinates: 53°27′51″N 23°0′52″E
- Country: Poland
- Voivodeship: Podlaskie
- County: Mońki
- Gmina: Jaświły

Bobrówka [bɔˈbrufka] is a village in the administrative district of Gmina Jaświły, within Mońki County, Podlaskie Voivodeship, in north-eastern Poland.
