= Wojciech Polak =

Polish archbishop

His Excellency Wojciech Polak
- Archbishop of Gniezno; Primate of Poland
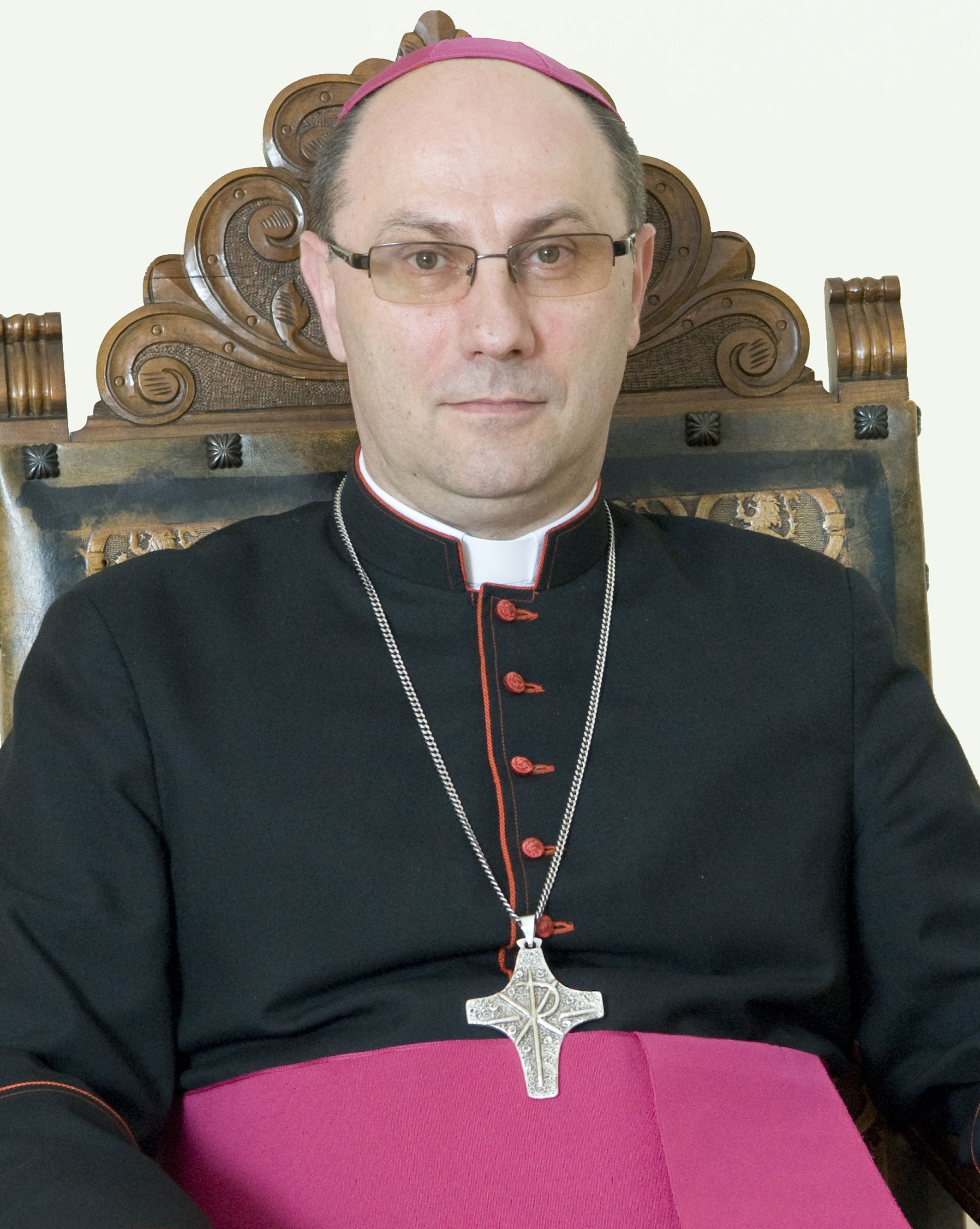
- Polak in 2014.
- Church: Roman Catholic Church
- Archdiocese: Gniezno
- See: Gniezno
- Appointed: 17 May 2014
- Installed: 7 June 2014
- Predecessor: Józef Kowalczyk
- Previous posts: Titular Bishop of Mons in Numidia (2003-14); Auxiliary Bishop of Gniezno (2003-14); Secretary General of the Polish Episcopal Conference (2011-14)

Orders
- Ordination: 13 May 1989 by Józef Glemp
- Consecration: 4 May 2003 by Henryk Józef Muszyński

Personal details
- Born: Wojciech Polak; 19 December 1964 (age 61) Inowrocław, Poland
- Education: Alphonsian Academy; Pontifical Lateran University
- Motto: Dominum confiteri Iesum ("Profess Jesus as the Lord")
- Coat of arms

Wojciech Polak (born 19 December 1964) is the Roman Catholic archbishop of Gniezno, Poland, since his appointment on 17 May 2014. He previously served as an auxiliary bishop of Gniezno.

== Biography ==
=== Early life ===
Polak was born in 1964 in Inowrocław, within the territory of the archdiocese. After passing his exams in 1983, he was admitted to the Major Seminary of Gniezno and on 13 May 1989 he was ordained to the priesthood. In the years 1989–1991 he was an assistant priest at St. Martin and Nicholas' Church in Bydgoszcz.

=== Early career ===
He studied at the Alphonsian Academy, where he obtained a licentiate in 1996 and a doctorate in moral theology. Following his studies, he held numerous positions including as prefect of discipline at the Major Seminary of Gniezno (1995–1999), rector of the Major Seminary (1999–2003), judge of the Ecclesiastical Court, professor of Moral Theology at the Major Seminary and since 1998 in the Faculty of Theology of the Adam Mickiewicz University in Poznań.

On 8 April 2003, he was appointed auxiliary bishop of Gniezno and titular bishop of Mons in Numidia by Pope John Paul II and he was consecrated on 4 May. Pope Benedict XVI named him a member of the Pontifical Council for the Pastoral Care of Migrants and Itinerant People on 17 December 2011.

In 2009 he was elected member of the Permanent Council of the Polish Episcopal Conference and since 2011 he has held the position of Secretary General. In 2013 he was elected Chairman of the Group for the contacts with the Russian Orthodox Church.

=== Archbishop of Gniezno ===
On 17 May 2014 Pope Francis appointed Polak the archbishop of Gniezno and, ex officio, primate of Poland, replacing the retiring Archbishop Józef Kowalczyk. He was installed at the Gniezno Cathedral on 7 June 2014.

Catholic Church titles
Preceded by Józef Kowalczyk	Archbishop of Gniezno and Primate of Poland since 17 May 2014	Incumbent
