= Polish Episcopal Conference =

Assembly of Catholic bishops

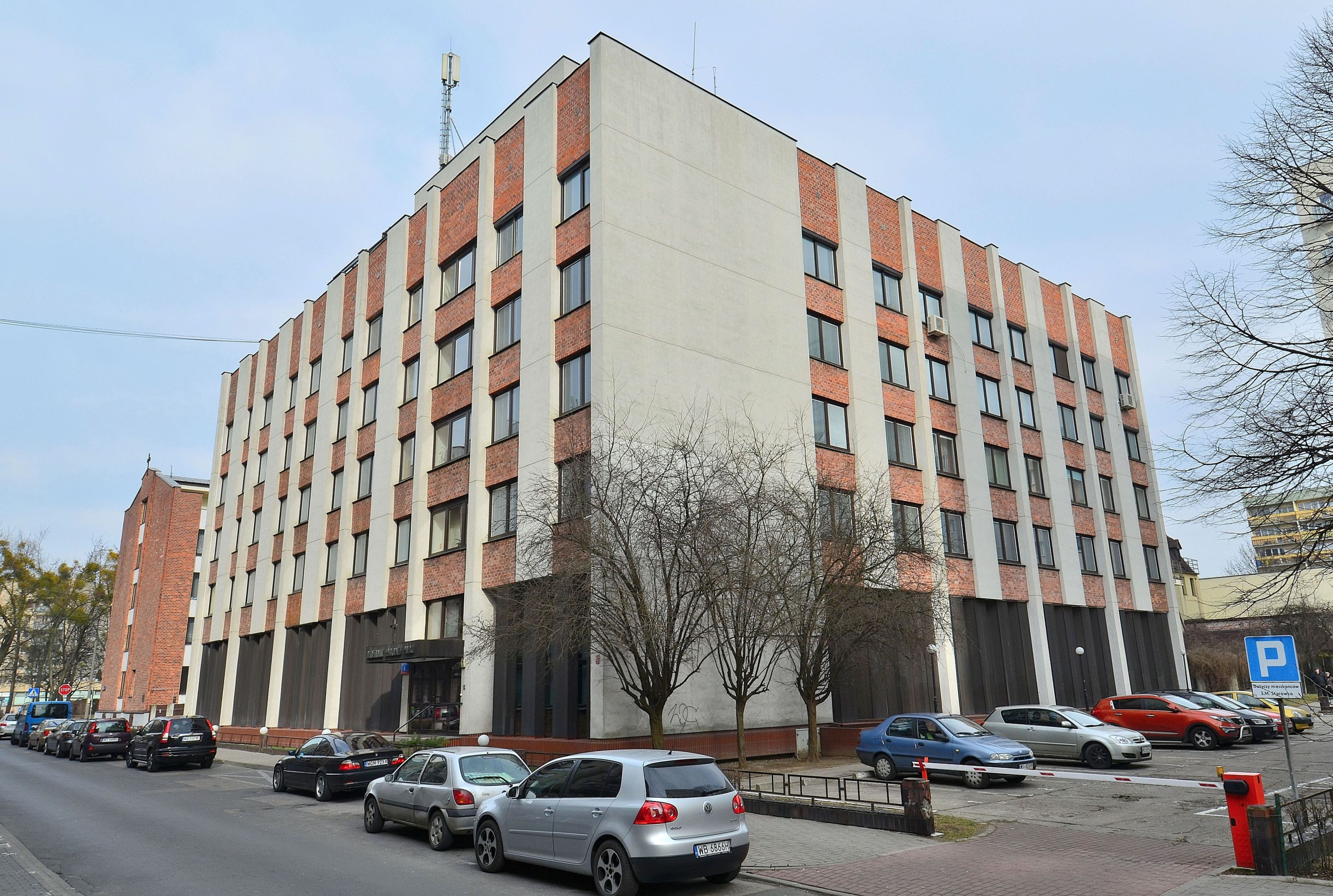
Secretariat of the Polish Episcopal Conference building at 6 Stefan Wyszyński Square in Warsaw

The Polish Episcopal Conference or Polish Bishops' Conference (Polish: Konferencja Episkopatu Polski or KEP) is the central organ of the Catholic Church in Poland. It is composed of three cardinals, 24 archbishops and 118 bishops.

== 21st century ==
In 2018, KEP completed a survey on clerical abuse against children and found that 382 priests had been accused of abusing at least 660 minors. The survey’s report led to the creation of the St Joseph’s Foundation to help abuse survivors as well as action against clergy.

In summer 2020, KEP stated that church teaching on homosexuality was infallible and promoted conversion therapy programs.

In June 2023, KEP made an appeal for calm discussions on migration and promoted wise hospitality and solidarity.

== Members ==
  - President – abp Tadeusz Wojda (since 14 March 2024)
  - Vice president – abp Józef Kupny (since 14 March 2024))
  - Secretary general – bp Marek Grzegorz Marczak (since 14 March 2024)
- Presidium
  - President – abp Tadeusz Wojda
  - Vice president – abp Józef Kupny
  - Primate of Poland – abp Wojciech Polak
  - Metropolitan Cardinals – card. Kazimierz Nycz, card. Grzegorz Ryś
  - Secretary general – bp Artur Miziński
  - 6 diocese bishops (chosen for 5 years) – abp Wacław Depo, abp Adrian Galbas, abp Józef Górzyński, bp Andrzej Czaja, bp Sławomir Oder, bp Wiesław Śmigiel
  - 2 auxiliary bishops (chosen for 5 years) – bp Marian Florczyk, bp Piotr Turzyński
- Commissions (only bishops can be members)
  - for the Doctrine of the Faith – head abp Stanisław Budzik
  - for Catholic Education – head bp Wojciech Osial
  - for Divine Worship and the Discipline of the Sacraments – head bp Piotr Greger
  - for the Clergy – head abp Wojciech Polak
  - for Christian ministry – head bp Andrzej Czaja
  - for Missions – head bp Jan Piotrowski
  - Charity – head bp Wiesław Szlachetka
  - for Institutes of Consecrated Life and Societies of Apostolic Life – head bp Jacek Kiciński
  - Marian – head abp Wacław Depo
  - Bishops and religious superiors – head bp Artur Miziński
  - for Polish diaspora – head bp Piotr Turzyński
  - Revisions – head abp Stanisław Budzik
- Councils (priests, religious and lay members allowed)
  - for Family – head bp Wiesław Śmigiel
  - Science – head abp Marek Jędraszewski
  - for Ecumenism – head bp Jacek Jezierski
  - for Inter-Religious Dialogue – head card. Grzegorz Ryś
  - for the Laity – head abp Adrian Galbas
  - for Society problems – head bp Marian Florczyk
  - for the Pastoral Care of Youth – head bp Grzegorz Suchodolski
  - for Culture and Cultural Heritage – head bp Michał Janocha
  - for Social Communications – head bp Rafał Markowski
  - for the Pastoral Care of Migrants and Itinerants – head bp Krzysztof Zadarko
  - Law – head bp Ryszard Kasyna
  - Economical – head bp Jan Piotrowski
- Teams (priests, religious and lay members allowed)
  - for contacts with French Episcopal Conference – head bp Jan Piotrowski
  - for contacts with Lithuanian Episcopal Conference – head bp Romuald Kamiński
  - for contacts with German Episcopal Conference – head abp Stanisław Budzik
  - for contacts with Ukrainian Greek Catholic Church – head bp Arkadiusz Trochanowski
  - for contacts with Polish Ecumenical Council – head bp Jacek Jezierski
  - for help Catholic Church in East – head bp Krzysztof Chudzio
  - for contacts with Russian Orthodox Church – head abp Wojciech Polak
  - for Scholarships – head bp Henryk Wejman
  - for Dialogue – bp Adam Bab, bp Roman Pindel, bp Adrian Put, bp Jacek Jezierski, bp Henryk Wejman
  - for Alcohol Abstinence – head bp Tadeusz Bronakowski
  - for programmed television transmission of Masses – head abp Józef Górzyński
  - for Enthronement of Christ movements – head bp Andrzej Czaja
  - for the Pastoral Care of Health Care Workers – head bp Romuald Kamiński
  - Bioethics – head bp Józef Wróbel
  - for Sanctuary – head bp Henryk Ciereszko
  - for the Pastoral Care of Radio Maryja – head bp Wiesław Śmigiel
  - for Promoting the New Evangelization – head bp Artur Ważny
  - for novelization Polish Episcopal Conference regulations – head bp Krzysztof Wętkowski
- Press office
  - Fr. Leszek Gęsiak SJ
- Concordat commission
  - bp Artur Miziński

== Presidents ==
(Until 1994, position held ex officio by the Primate of Poland)

- 1919–1926 – card. Edmund Dalbor
- 1926–1948 – card. August Hlond
- 1948–1981 – card. Stefan Wyszyński
- 1981–2004 – card. Józef Glemp
- 2004–2014 – abp Józef Michalik
- 2014–2024 – abp Stanisław Gądecki
- since 2024 – abp Tadeusz Wojda

== Vice presidents ==
- 1969–1978 – St. card. Karol Wojtyła
- 1979–1994 – card. Franciszek Macharski
- 1994–1999 – abp Henryk Muszyński
- 1999–2004 – abp Józef Michalik
- 2004–2014 – abp Stanisław Gądecki
- 2014–2024 – abp Marek Jędraszewski
- since 2024 – abp Józef Kupny

== Secretaries general ==
- 1918–1919 – bl. bp Antoni Julian Nowowiejski
- 1919–1925 – bp Henryk Przeździecki
- 1925–1926 – bp Romuald Jałbrzykowski
- 1926–1946 – bp Stanisław Kostka Łukomski
- 1946–1968 – bp Zygmunt Choromański
- 1969–1993 – bp Bronisław Wacław Dąbrowski
- 1993–1998 – bp Tadeusz Pieronek
- 1998–2007 – bp Piotr Libera
- 2007–2011 – bp Stanisław Budzik
- 2011–2014 – bp Wojciech Polak
- 2014–2024 – bp Artur Miziński
- since 2024 – bp Marek Grzegorz Marczak

== See also ==
- Episcopal Conference
- Day of Prayers for Prisoners
