= List of bishops of Łomża =

List of Roman Catholic bishops of the Roman Catholic Diocese of Łomża (formed in 1925):

Diocesan bishops
Romuald Jałbrzykowski	1925–1926
Stanisław Kostka Łukomski	1926–1948
Czesław Falkowski	1949–1969
Mikołaj Sasinowski	1970–1982
Juliusz Paetz	1982–1996
Stanisław Stefanek	1996–2011
Janusz Stepnowski	since 2011
Auxiliary bishop
Bernard Dembek	1930–1937
Tadeusz Paweł Zakrzewski	1938–1946
Czesław Rydzewski	1946–1951
Aleksander Mościcki	1952–1980
Edward Samsel	1982–1992
Tadeusz Józef Zawistowski	1973–2006
Tadeusz Bronakowski	2006–present
