= Franciszek Skarbek-Malczewski =

Polish Roman Catholic bishop (1754 – 1819)

- Primate of Poland; Archbishop of Warsaw
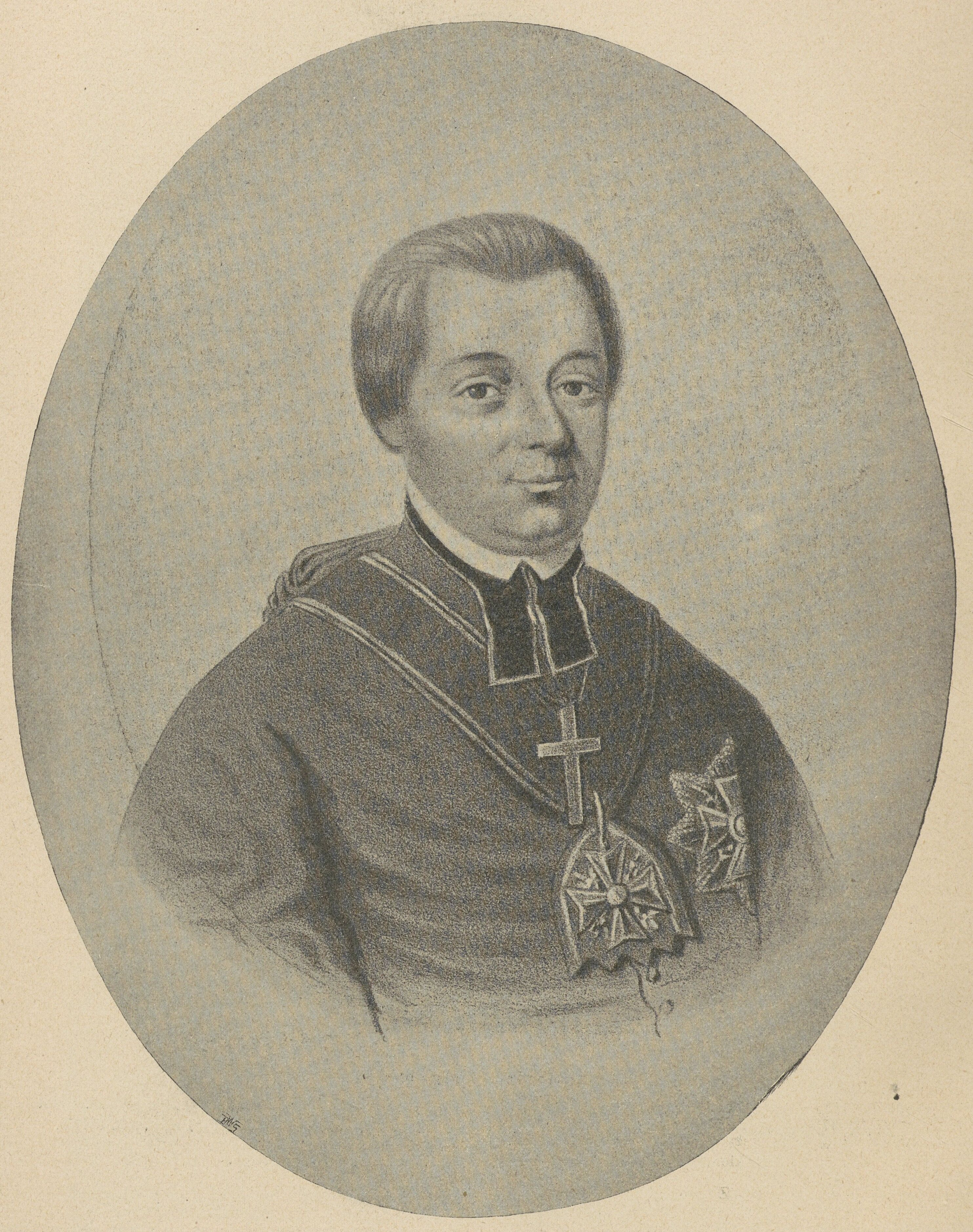
- Appointed: 2 October 1818
- Installed: 1 January 1819
- Predecessor: Józef Miaskowski
- Successor: Szczepan Hołowczyc
- Previous post(s): Bishop of Kujawy-Pomorze (1815–1818)

Orders
- Ordination: 14 April 1783
- Consecration: 5 November 1815 by Jan Klemens Gołaszewski

Personal details
- Born: 4 October 1754; Chwalęcin, Polish-Lithuanian Commonwealth
- Died: 18 April 1819 (aged 64); Warsaw, Congress Poland

Franciszek Skarbek-Malczewski (4 October 1754 – 18 April 1819) was a Polish Roman Catholic archbishop of the Archdiocese of Warsaw and the primate of Poland from 1818 until his death in 1819. He previously served as bishop of the Diocese of Kujawy-Pomorze from 1815 to 1818.

== Biography ==
Malczewski was born in Chwalęcin to Antony Skarbek and Maria Daleszyński. After entering the seminary in Poznań, he moved to Rome and began studying theology there. He was ordained a priest on 14 April 1783. After his ordination, he purchased a doctorate of both laws on 30 August 1783; this was noticed by Pope Pius VI, who ordered him to be moved to the cathedral chapter of the Archdiocese of Gniezno, to which he had been appointed a canon on 27 April 1780. He served as deputy judge for the consistory of Gniezno and also as parish priest in Mokronos from 1789. On 25 January 1790, he was appointed canon for the cathedral chapter of the Diocese of Vilnius.

After the death of Ignacy Krasicki, Malczewski was appointed apostolic administrator of the Archdiocese of Gniezno on 30 March 1801. He served as its apostolic administrator until 1805, when he decided to transfer to the Diocese of Kujawy-Pomorze over the Diocese of Poznań. While he was appointed as bishop of Kujawy-Pomorze by decree of the Prussian government in 1806 and by decree of Frederick Augustus in 1808, this appointment was only formally recognized by the Holy See on 4 September 1815. During this period, he served as apostolic administrator for the Diocese of Poznań between 1806 and 1809. He was eventually consecrated bishop of Kujawy-Pomorze on 5 November 1815 by Jan Klemens Gołaszewski; his co-consecrators were Feliks Łukasz Lewiński and Antonin Malinowski.

In 1818, Malczewski was appointed by Pope Pius VII to serve as an apostolic delegate to reorganize the administrative divisions of the church in Congress Poland. He was appointed the first archbishop of Warsaw and primate of Poland by decree of Tsar Alexander I on 31 July 1818 and by the Holy See on 2 October 1818. He received his pallium at St. John's Archcathedral in Warsaw on 26 December 1818, and ceremonially assumed control of the Archdiocese on 1 January 1819. Malczewski died on the evening of 18 April 1819 in Warsaw. He was originally buried at St. John's Archcathedral on 21 April, though his body was later moved to Powązki Cemetery.
