= Diocese of Sejny =

Diocese of the Latin Church of the Roman Catholic Church

Diocese of Sejny or rather Augustów Dioecesis Sejnensis seu Augustoviensis Polish: Diecezja sejneńska, czyli augustowska
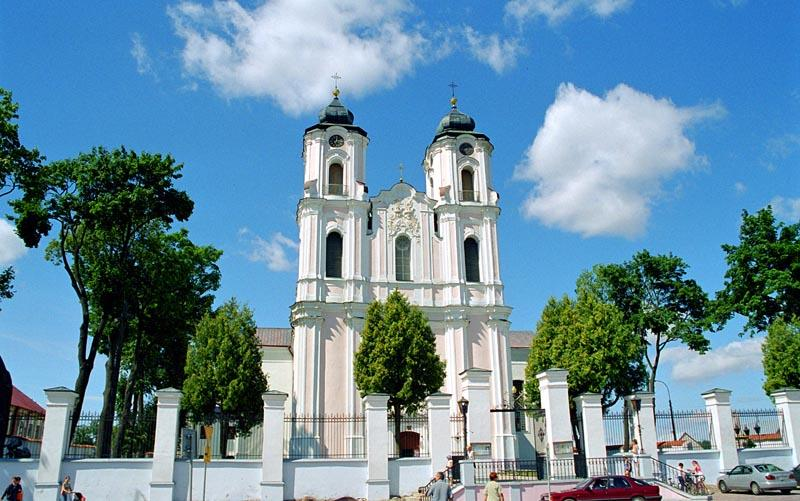
- Basilica of the Visitation of the Blessed Virgin Mary in Sejny, former cathedral church of the diocese

Location
- Country: Congress Poland; Poland
- Territory: Sejny
- Ecclesiastical province: Warsaw

Information
- Denomination: Catholic
- Sui iuris church: Latin Church
- Rite: Roman Rite
- Established: 1818
- Dissolved: 1925
- Cathedral: Cathedral of the Visitation of the Blessed Virgin Mary in Sejny

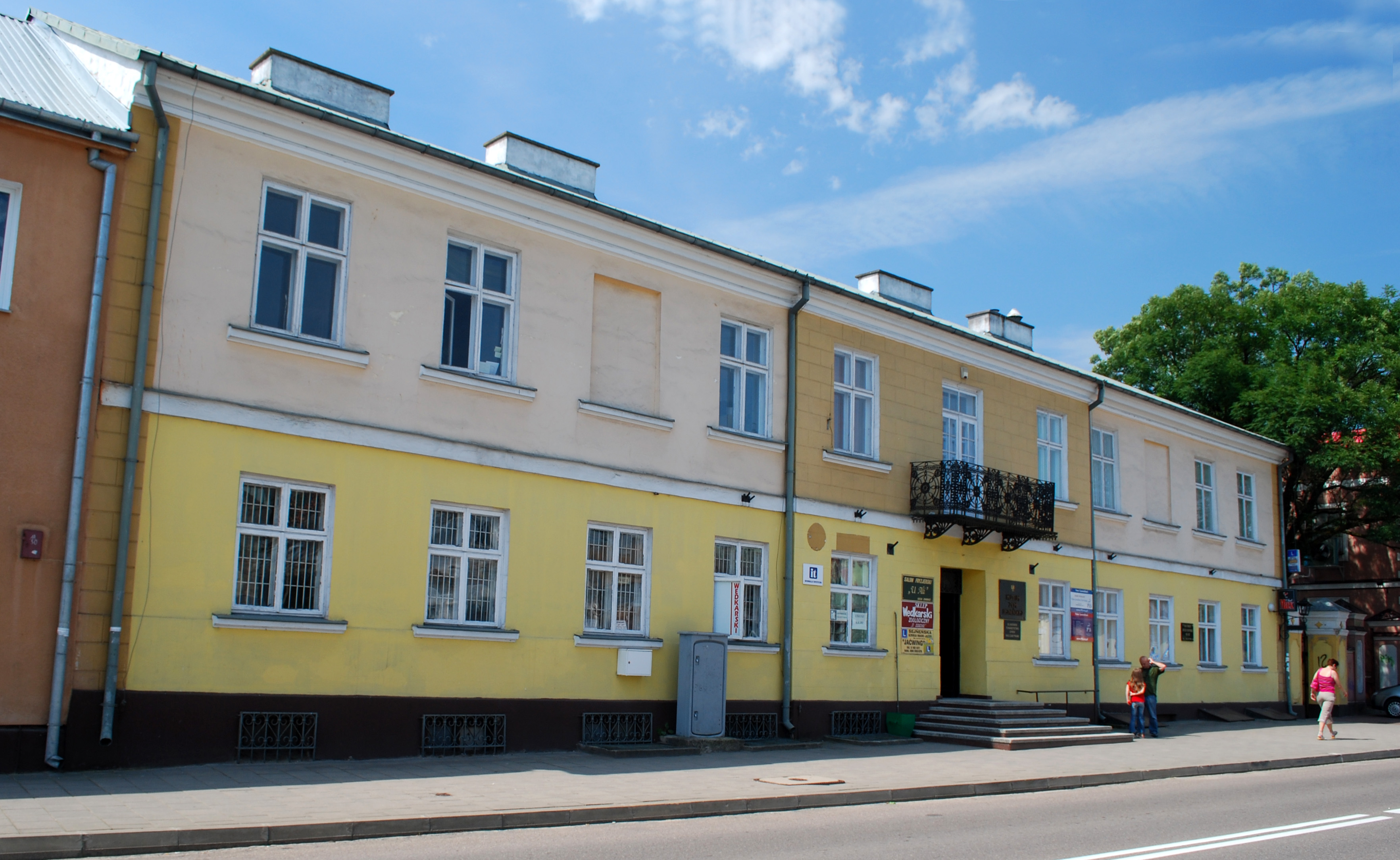
Former episcopal palace (now the Museum of the Sejny Region)

The Diocese of Sejny, properly the Diocese of Sejny or rather Augustów (Latin: Dioecesis Sejnensis seu Augustoviensis), was a diocese of the Latin Church of the Roman Catholic Church with the seat of its bishops in Sejny, which existed from 1818 to 1925. In 1925 it was suppressed and divided into the Diocese of Łomża and the Diocese of Vilkaviškis.

In 2009, Sejny was established as a titular see. The title of the first titular bishop of Sejny was given to archbishop Jan Pawłowski, Apostolic Nuncio to the Republic of the Congo and Gabon.

== History ==
In 1799, a new Diocese of Wigry was established from territories of the Diocese of Lutsk, Diocese of Vilnius, and Diocese of Samogitia that had been annexed by Kingdom of Prussia as a result of the Third Partition of Poland. After Congress of Vienna most of the Diocese of Wigry territory was incorporated to, subjugated to Russia, Kingdom of Poland. By a papal bull of 30 April 1818, Pope Pius VII suppressed the Diocese of Wigry, creating a new diocese in its place. The diocese was incorporated into the newly-established Metropolis of Warsaw.

Originally, the bishop’s seat was in Augustów. However, already in 1823 the second bishop, Ignacy Stanisław Czyżewski, moved to Sejny, making the former Dominican Church of the Visitation the cathedral. In the following years, bishops resided in one or the other town, or in Warsaw. For this reason, the diocese was known under the double name “Sejny, or rather Augustów,” although the shorter form “Diocese of Sejny” was in common use. Sejny ultimately became the episcopal see on 4 February 1837, when Bishop Paweł Straszyński solemnly entered the restored cathedral, he was also the first bishop to be buried there. In 1826, a seminary had been established in the post-monastic buildings.

In the years 1847–1863, the Russian authorities didn't allow the bishopric to be filled, so the diocese was governed by administrators: Mikołaj Błocki, Bonawentura Butkiewicz, and Jakub Choiński. Only in 1863 was Konstanty Ireneusz Łubieński appointed bishop. On his initiative, construction of the episcopal palace was begun. However, because of his oppositional stance, he was arrested on 31 May 1869 and exiled to Siberia. He died in Nizhny Novgorod on 16 June 1869.

In 1918 the territory of the diocese found itself within Poland and Lithuania. Bishop Antanas Karosas remained in Lithuania; already during World War I he appointed Romuald Jałbrzykowski as vicar general for the Polish territories. Jałbrzykowski received episcopal consecration on 30 November 1918 in Łomża. The Lithuanian part contained 286,000 faithful, while the Polish part had 392,000. In 1925–1926 this situation was formally regularized. The Diocese of Sejny was suppressed. From its Polish section, after adding the deaneries of Czyżew, Ostrów Mazowiecka, and Ostrołęka (without the parish of Goworowo) from the Diocese of Płock, a new Diocese of Łomża was created, with 520,000 faithful and subject to the Metropolitan Archdiocese of Vilnius. From the Lithuanian part of the diocese, a new Diocese of Vilkaviškis was created in 1926, subordinated to the Metropolitan Archdiocese of Kaunas; Antanas Karosas remained its bishop.

== Bishops ==
=== Diocesan bishops ===
- Jan Klemens Gołaszewski (30 June 1818 – 8 March 1820) – until 1818 bishop of Wigry
- Ignacy Stanisław Czyżewski (29 May 1820 – 11 December 1823) – coadjutor in 1819–1820
- Mikołaj Jan Manugiewicz (19 December 1825 – 25 June 1834)
- Paweł Straszyński (21 November 1836 – 21 July 1847)
- Konstanty Ireneusz Łubieński (21 May 1862 – 16 June 1869)
- Piotr Paweł Wierzbowski (25 August 1872 – 1 July 1893)
- Antanas Baranauskas (2 August 1897 – 26 November 1902)
- Józef Antonowicz (administrator 1902–1910)
- Antanas Karosas (7 April 1910 – 28 October 1925) – from 1926 bishop of Vilkaviškis

=== Auxiliary bishops ===
- Polikarp Augustyn Marciejewski (1819–1827)
- Stanisław Choromański (1829–1836)
- Józef Hollak (1883–1890)
- Romuald Jałbrzykowski (1918–1925)

== Bibliography ==
- Guzewicz, Wojciech (2016). "Sejneński ośrodek kościelny (wybrane zagadnienia)". Civitas et Lex. 10.
- Kowalewski, Tadeusz; Łupiński, Józef, eds. (2005). Biskupi diecezji łomżyńskiej. Działalność społeczna, polityczna, religijna. Łomża.
- Stępień, Marek (2008). "Biskupi diecezji augustowskiej czyli sejneńskiej (1818-1925) a Stolica Apostolska". Legnickie Studia Teologiczno-Historyczne. 13.
