= Piotr Paweł Wierzbowski =

Roman Catholic bishop (1818 – 1893)

- Bishop of Sejny or Augustów
- Appointed: 23 February 1872
- Predecessor: Konstanty Ireneusz Łubieński
- Successor: Antanas Baranauskas

Orders
- Ordination: 31 October 1841 by Paweł Straszyński
- Consecration: 6 October 1872 by Antoni Fijałkowski

Personal details
- Born: 14 July 1818 Wierzbowo
- Died: 1 July 1893 (aged 74)

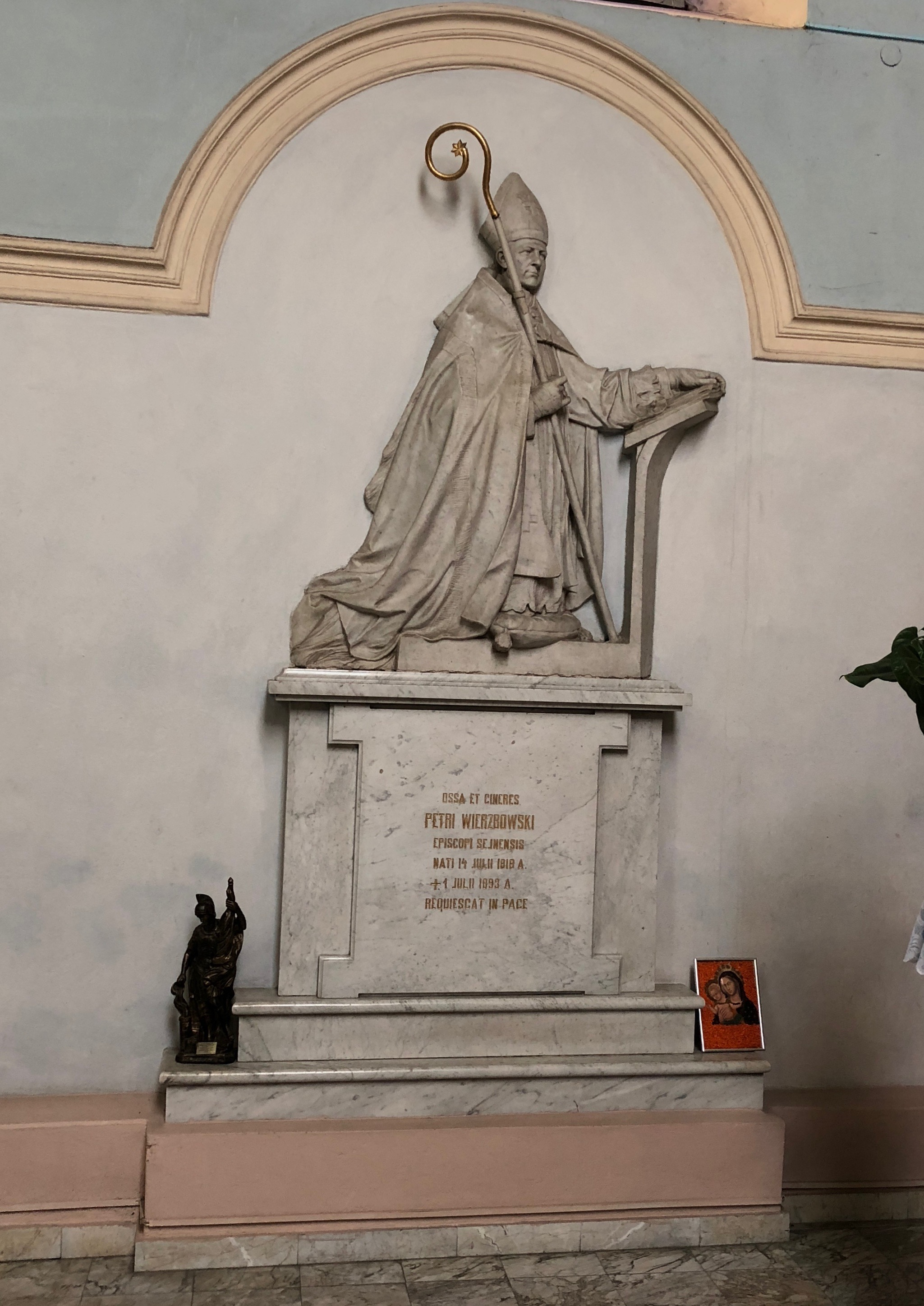
Memorial plate for bishop Piotr Paweł Wierzbowski in Sejny Cathedral

Piotr Paweł Wierzbowski (14 July 1818 – 1 July 1893) was a Roman Catholic bishop of the Diocese of Sejny or Augustów from 1872 until his death in 1893.

== Biography ==
Wierzbowski was born in Wierzbowo to Tomasz and Agnieszka Wierzbowski. He was educated at a public school in Łomża; he began attending a seminary at Tykocin in 1837 after completing his schooling. He was ordained a priest on 31 October 1841 by Paweł Straszyński. He served as Straszyński's chaplain and as secretary of the consistory of Łomża until 1847, when he was appointed regent of the consistory; he served as regent until the following year. After his term was over, he served as pastor in Szumowo until 1854, when he was appointed to serve a second term as regent of the consistory. In 1855, he was appointed pastor in Suwałki; he was appointed an honorary canon of the Diocese of Lublin in 1860. Wierzbowski was appointed dean of Suwałki and inspector of monasteries in 1867.

On 23 February 1872, Wierzbowski was appointed bishop of Diocese of Sejny or Augustów; he was consecrated on 6 October 1872 in the Church of St. Catherine in St. Petersburg by Antoni Fijałkowski; his co-consecrators were Jerzy Iwaszkiewicz and Tomasz Kuliński. He assumed control of the diocese on 28 October 1872. Wierzbowski died on 1 July 1893; his funeral was held on 5 July in Sejny and he was buried at the cathedral located there.
