= List of bishops and archbishops of Warsaw =

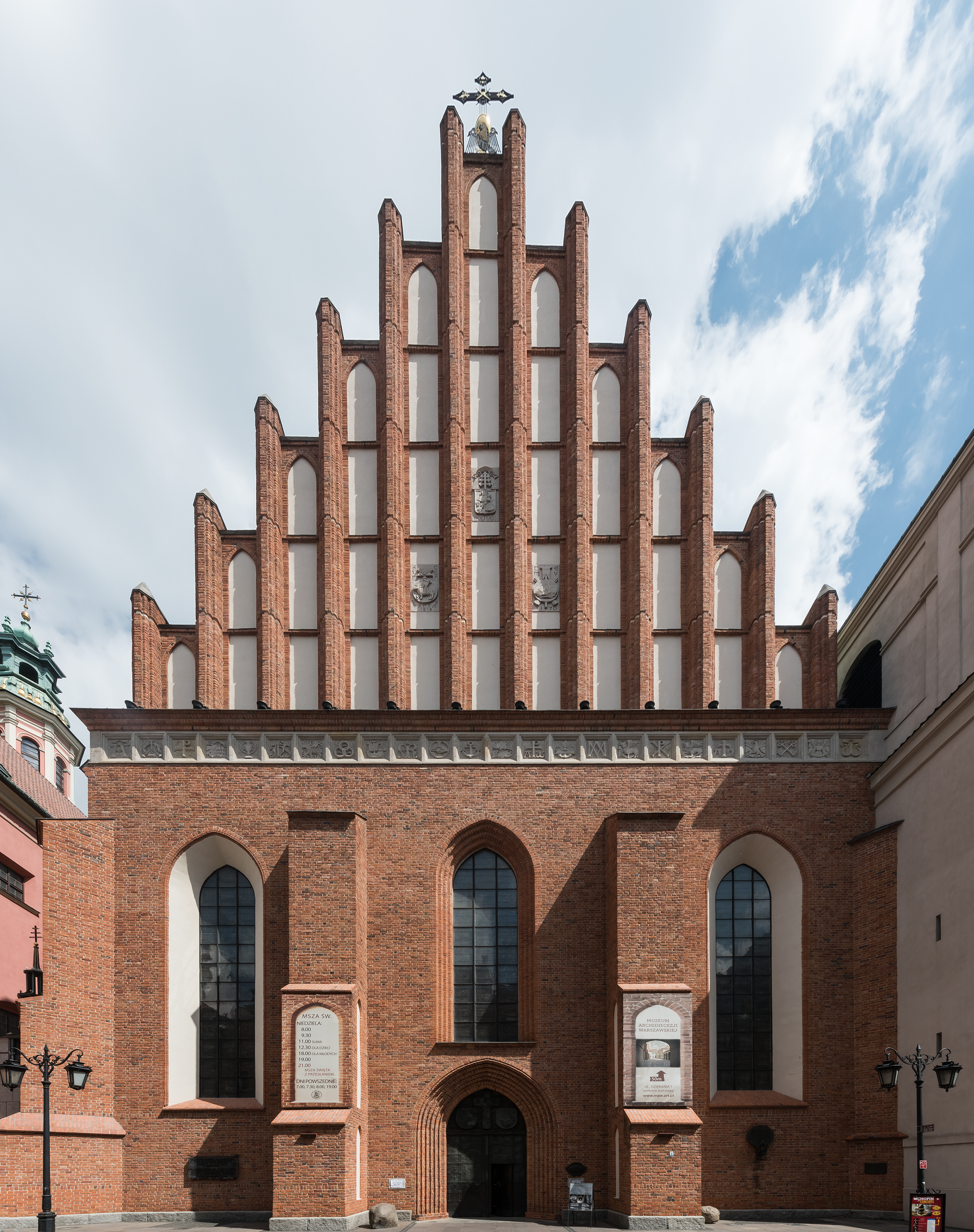
St. John's Cathedral after the post-war reconstruction

The following is a list of the bishops and archbishops of Warsaw. On 30 June 1818, the see was elevated to the rank of an archdiocese.

Also included are the auxiliary bishops.

Bishops of Warsaw:

- Józef Miaskowski, 1798–1804
- Ignacy Raczyński, Apostolic Administrator 1806–1818

Archbishops of Warsaw:

- Franciszek Skarbek-Malczewski, 1818–1819
- Szczepan Hołowczyc, 1819–1823
- Wojciech Skarszewski, 1824–1827
- Jan Paweł Woronicz, 1828–1829
- Stanisław Kostka Choromański, 1836–1838
- Tomasz Chmielewski, 1836–1844
- Antoni Melchior Fijałkowski, Apostolic Administrator 1844–1856, Archbishop 1856–1861
- Antoni Białobrzeski, Apostolic Administrator 1861–1862
- Zygmunt Szczęsny Feliński, 1862–1883
- Wincenty Teofil Popiel, 1883–1912
- Aleksander Kakowski, 1913–1938
- Stanisław Gall, Apostolic Administrator 1940–1942
- Antoni Szlagowski, vicary 1942–1946
- August Hlond, 1946–1948
- Stefan Wyszyński, 1948–1981
- Józef Glemp, 1981–2007
- Stanisław Wielgus, 2007
- Kazimierz Nycz, since 3 March 2007
- Adrian Joseph Galbas, since 14 December 2024

Auxiliary bishops

- John Baptist Albertrandi, 1798–1808
- Daniel Ostrowski, 1818–1831
- Mikołaj Jan Manugiewicz, 1822–1825
- Franciszek Pawłowski, 1827–1829
- Tomasz Chmielewski, 1837–1844
- Jan Dekert, 1859–1861
- Henryk Ludwik Plater, 1859–1868
- Kazimierz Ruszkiewicz, 1884–1925
- Stanisław Gall, 1918–1919, 1933–1940
- Władysław Szcześniak, 1925–1926
- Antoni Szlagowski, 1928–1956
- Zygmunt Choromański, 1946–1968
- Wacław Majewski, 1946–1983
- Jerzy Modzelewski, 1959–1986
- Bronisław Dąbrowski, 1962–1993
- Władysław Miziołek, 1969–1992
- Zbigniew Józef Kraszewski, 1970–1992
- Kazimierz Romaniuk, 1982–1992
- Marian Duś, 1986–2013
- Stanisław Kędziora, 1987–1992
- Józef Zawitkowski, 1990–1992
- Piotr Jarecki, since 1994
- Tadeusz Pikus, 1999–2014
- Rafał Markowski, since 2013
- Józef Górzyński, 2013–2015
- Michał Janocha, since 2015
