= Tadeusz Bronakowski =

Polish Catholic bishop (born 1959)

- Auxiliary Bishop of Łomża
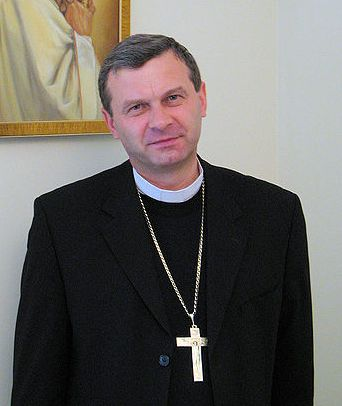
- Bronakowski in 2008
- Church: Roman Catholic Church
- Province: Białystok
- In office: 11 February 2006 –
- Other post: Titular Bishop of Tigisis in Mauretania

Orders
- Ordination: 26 May 1984 by Juliusz Paetz
- Consecration: 4 March 2006 by Stanisław Stefanek
- Rank: Bishop

Personal details
- Born: 3 November 1959 (age 66) Augustów, Poland
- Motto: Nolite timere, Deus caritas est
- Coat of arms

Tadeusz Bronakowski (born 3 November 1959) is a Polish Catholic bishop, being the Auxiliary Bishop of the Roman Catholic Diocese of Łomża as well as Titular Bishop of Tigisis in Mauretania since 2006.

== Biography ==
=== Early life ===
Bronakowski was born in the city of Augustów do parents Henryk and Leonarda. He graduated from the Secondary School in Suchowola. Between the years of 1978 and 1984, Bronakowski studied at the Higher Theological Seminary in Łomża. He was ordained by Juliusz Paetz on 26 May 1984 in the Cathedral of St. Michael the Archangel, Łomża. In the years 1985–1988, Bronakowski completed his master's studies of Canon law at the Cardinal Stefan Wyszyński University, Warsaw. In 1993, Bronakowski obtained a doctorate in Canon law at the same university with a Thesis titled "Granice i ustrój Diecezji Łomżyńskiej w latach 1925–1992".

== Ordination as Bishop ==
On the 11 February 2006, Pope Benedict XVI appointed him as the Auxiliary Bishop of the Diocese of Łomża as well as Titular Bishop of Tigisis in Mauretania. He received his consecration on 4 March 2006 in the Łomża Cathedral, he was consecrated by the then Bishop, Stanisław Stefanek with the help of bishops Tadeusz Józef Zawistowski and Wojciech Ziemba. He took the following words as his episcopal motto: "Nolite timere, Deus caritas est" (Do not be afraid, God is love).
