= Mikołaj Sasinowski =

Polish Roman Catholic bishop (1909 – 1982)

- Bishop of Łomża

Orders
- Ordination: 28 March 1935 by Stanisław Kostka Łukomski
- Consecration: 4 April 1970 by Stefan Wyszyński

Personal details
- Born: 16 November 1909 Mieczki
- Died: 6 September 1982 (aged 72) Łomża
- Military career
- Allegiance: Polish government-in-exile
- Branch: Polish Air Forces
- Service years: 1939 – 1945
- Rank: Major

Mikołaj Sasinowski (16 November 1909 – 6 September 1982) was a Roman Catholic bishop of the Diocese of Łomża from 1970 to 1982.

== Biography ==
=== Early life ===
Sasinowski was born in 1909 in Mieczki to Józef and Anna Sasinowski. He was first educated at various gymnasiums in Łomża, graduating in 1930. On 11 August 1930, he was called to 10 months of military training; after graduating from military training, he was assigned to the 33rd Infantry Regiment. Later, he was assigned to a reserve platoon on 16 September 1931. After his military service, he entered the diocesan seminary in Łomża on 4 October 1931; he was ordained a priest on 28 March 1935 by Stanisław Kostka Łukomski.

After his ordination, Sasinowski served as parish priest in Suwałki beginning on 7 April 1935. He began studying canon law at the University of Warsaw in September 1936, graduating in May 1939 with a magister degree in canon law. He worked from October 1936 to July 1939 as a catechist in Warsaw.

=== Military service ===
In fall 1939, after the outbreak of World War II, he joined the Polish military and underwent an officers' training course at Coëtquidan. After graduating in February 1940, he was assigned as a chaplain to Polish airmen based at Lyon-Bron Airport. Sasinowski was evacuated to north Africa on 25 June 1940 after the fall of France, and was later transported to the United Kingdom.

On 16 July 1940, Sasinowski was assigned to the 18 Operational Training Unit RAF, based at Hucknall Aerodrome, as well as the No. 308 Polish Fighter Squadron based at RAF Bramcote. In June 1941, he was assigned as chaplain to the No. 304 and No. 305 Bomber Squadrons, based at RAF Lindholme. Due to health issues, he was transferred to RAF Halton in October 1942. While there, he served as a chaplain and religious teacher at a gymnasium in Halton, beginning in 1943. He ended his military service in November 1946 on the orders of bishop Łukomski and returned to Poland. He ended his service as a major in the Polish Air Forces and a squadron leader in the Royal Air Force, having been awarded the Air Medal on 3 occasions.

=== Professor and bishop ===
After returning to Poland, Sasinowski was appointed vicar and prefect of a secondary school based in Ostrołęka. He continued his studies at the University of Warsaw, obtaining a doctorate in canon law on 1 April 1948. After studying Catholic social teaching at the John Paul II Catholic University of Lublin, he was appointed professor of moral theology at the diocesan seminary in Łomża on 1 July 1949. He also lectured in paterology from 1949 to 1951 and in preaching from 1949 to 1953. He was appointed a canon capitular of Łomża on 14 November 1957 and was appointed rector of the diocesan seminary in Łomża on 23 September 1968.

On 19 March 1970, Sasinowski was appointed bishop of the Diocese of Łomża. He was consecrated on 5 April 1970 in the Cathedral of St. Michael the Archangel at Łomża by Stefan Wyszyński. He was co-consecrated by Jan Mazur and Aleksander Mościcki. He died on 6 September 1982 in Łomża of a heart attack and was buried in the crypt of the cathedral located there.
