= Tigisis =

Tigisis (Italian: Tigisi) can refer to

- Tigisis in Mauretania, an ancient town and modern titular see
- Tigisis in Numidia, an ancient town and modern titular see
