= Hospita =

Ancient Roman city

Hospita is a former Ancient city and Roman bishopric, in present Algeria, now a Latin Catholic titular see.

== History ==
Hospita was one of many cities in the Roman province of Numidia, important enough to become a suffragan bishopric, but like most faded completely.

Its only recorded bishops were :

- Bennatus, participating in the conference of Carthage of 411, confronting Catholic and Donatist (heretical) bishops in Roman North Africa,
  - joined by his Donatist counterpart as anti-bishop of Hospita, Lucullus.
- Gedalius partook in the synod called in Carthage in 484 by the Vandal king Huneric, again with Donatists, after which he was exiled with his Catholic peers.

== Titular see ==
The diocese was nominally restored in 1933: Established as Latin Titular bishopric of Hospita (Latin) / Ospita (Curiate Italian) / Hospiten(sis) (Latin adjective).

It has had the following incumbents, so far of the fitting Episcopal (lowest) rank :

- José Melhado Campos (1965.02.22 – 1973.01.08) as Coadjutor Bishop of Sorocaba (Brazil) (1965.02.22 – 1973.01.08), next succeeding as Bishop of Sorocaba (1973.01.08 – retired 1981.03.20); previously Bishop of Lorena (Brazil) (1960.05.29 – 1965.02.22); died 1996
- Tadeusz Józef Zawistowski (1973.05.12 – death 2015.06.01) as Auxiliary Bishop of Roman Catholic Diocese of Łomża (Poland) (1973.05.12 – retired 2006.02.11) and on emeritate
- Cristián Carlo Roncagliolo Pacheco (2017.03.23 – ...), Bishop-elect, Auxiliary Bishop of Archdiocese of Santiago (de Chile (2017.03.23 – ...), no previously prelature.

== See also ==
- List of Catholic dioceses in Algeria

== Sources and external links ==
- GCatholic - data for all sections

Bibliography

- Pius Bonifacius Gams, Series episcoporum Ecclesiae Catholicae, Leipzig, 1931, p. 466
- Stefano Antonio Morcelli, Africa christiana, Volume I, Brescia, 1816, pp. 187–188
