= Ex imposita nobis =

Papal bull of 1818

Ex imposita nobis is a papal bull issued by Pope Pius VII on June 30, 1818. The bull redefined the boundaries of the dioceses within Congress Poland and served as one of the major ecclesiastical responses to the Congress of Vienna. The bull also allowed for the dissolution of some ecclesiastical institutions in Polish territories.

== Background ==
The Polish–Lithuanian Commonwealth experienced three partitions in the late 1700s that split the country between Russia, Austria, and Prussia. During the Napoleonic Wars, the Duchy of Warsaw was created as a satellite state of France from 1807 to 1815, but the Congress of Vienna returned all Polish territories to the original three partitioning powers in 1815. As a result of the partitions, certain ecclesiastical anomalies occurred. Notably, the seat of the Primate of Poland found itself in Prussia, while other parts of Poland were under either Russian or Austrian control. The pope acceded to these territorial changes by reorganizing the dioceses of Congress Poland with Ex imposita nobis.

== Content ==
List of dioceses that were created as a result of the bull:

- Diocese of Sandomierz
- The Diocese of Sejny was created from the Diocese of Wigry. The towns of Augustów and Sejny were the residences of the early bishops of this diocese.
- The creation of the Diocese of Janów/Podlachia had been the subject of earlier negotiations between Russian and Vatican authorities, but its boundaries were included in the bull.

List of dioceses that were eliminated:

- The Diocese of Wigry became the Diocese of Augustów/Sejny.
- The Diocese of Kielce lost its territory to the new Diocese of Sandomierz. The Diocese of Kielce was later revived.

Other diocesan changes:

- The Diocese of Warsaw had been elevated to an archdiocese earlier in 1818. It received 114 parishes that had previously belonged to the Gniezno Diocese.
- The Diocese of Włocławek had lost much of its original geography to Prussia and was renamed as the Diocese of Włocławek–Kalisz. The new geography of the diocese contained 344 churches with only 59 belonging to the original diocese. This diocese also sometimes used the name of Kujawy.
- The Diocese of Lublin was also adjusted by the bull.

== Other outcomes ==
The historic Gidle Charterhouse and Cistercian Abbey in Ląd were closed in the years following the bull.

== See also ==
- List of papal bulls
