= Franciszek Pawłowski =

Polish Roman Catholic bishop

The Most Reverend Franciszek Pawłowski
- Bishop of Płock
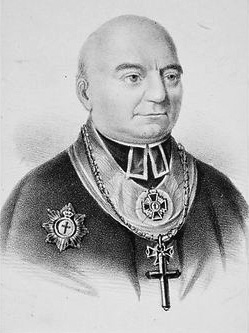
- Franciszek Pawłowski c. 1850
- Church: Catholic Church
- Diocese: Płock
- Installed: 6 February 1836
- Predecessor: Adam Michal Prażmowski
- Successor: Wincenty Teofil Popiel

Orders
- Ordination: 12 April 1800
- Consecration: 27 May 1827 by Wojciech Skarszewski

Personal details
- Born: 30 March 1774 Mokre, Prussia
- Died: 6 July 1852 (aged 78) Warsaw, Poland, Russia
- Buried: Płock, Poland
- Denomination: Catholic
- Education: University of Königsberg Theological Semminary in Włocławek

Franciszek Pawłowski (30 March 1774 – 6 July 1852) was a Polish prelate of the Catholic Church who served as the bishop of Płock from 1836 to his death in 1852. He previously served as the coadjutor bishop within the same diocese from 1829 and as an auxiliary bishop in the Archdiocese of Warsaw, holding the office of the titular bishop of Duvno from 1827 to 1836.

== Early life ==
Pawłowski was born in Mokre near Czersk in a family of a standard bearer Michał and his wife Jozefa née Łukowicz. He lived in the family estate, which was later expanded by his father in Rulewo and Buśnia, where he lived periodically. Pawłowski inherited the estates in 1813. Pawłowski started his education at the Jesuit Junior High School in Chojnice and continued in the Nowe Szkoty neighbourhood of Gdańsk. After graduating from high school, he enrolled at the University of Königsberg on 17 November 1796, where he studied philosophy and law. He also considered enrolling at the Collegio Teutonico in Rome to become a priest, having obtained a letter of recommendation from the bishop in 1795.

After finishing his studies in 1799, Pawłowski worked as a court clerk in Kwidzyn. However, after lightning killed his companion during a walk, Pawłowski became a priest. On 27 April 1799, he entered the Theological Seminary in Włocławek, while Feliks Łukasz Lewiński, the auxiliary bishop of Włocławek, took care that he received his orders quickly. Pawłowski received minor orders on 6 October 1799 and became a subdeacon on 19 January 1800. On 2 February 1800, he became a deacon and was ordained to the priesthood on 12 April. He received all of his orders in the Włocławek Cathedral, except for priesthood, which he received in the Church of St. Vitalis, the oldest church in Włocławek. He celebrated his first mass in the Bernardine friary in Skępe.

Pawłowski's first post was the vicariate in the parish of St. Assumption of the Blessed Virgin Mary in Tuczno, in the Inowrocław deanery, where he stayed for four months, since in July 1800 he became a parish priest in the joint parish of Lubień and Bzów, which today belong to the Diocese of Pelplin. In 1802, Pawłowski became a parish priest in Tczew and the parish of St. Holy Trinity in Lubiszewo. All of the posts were located near his family estate. In 1804, he was appointed a canon of the Diocese of Włocławek, which necessitated the approval from the Prussian government, received on 18 June 1805. In 1804, he received a doctorate in theology from Pope Pius VII.

Bishop Józef Ignacy Rybiński of Włocławek promoted fast advancement in his career. On 12 April 1805, he appointed Pawłowski to the office of Pomeranian and Gdańsk official, entrusting him with the court matters through the duty of a court official and entrusting him with the duties of a deputy bishop. Since the Diocese of Włocławek was divided politically between the Duchy of Warsaw and Prussia, with the entire Pomeranian archdeaconry remained with Prussia, this time with Gdańsk, the Gdańsk official administered the detached parts. Pawłowski held the office for seven years, hearing mostly the clergy's complaints about the lack of discipline among the priests and the lack of authority and discernment among the faithful. At the same time, he was appointed as the parish priest of the parish of St. Motherhood of the Blessed Virgin Mary in Miłobądz in 1806. Pawłowski mostly lived in Lubiszewo Tczewskie. He held the office until 1812, when he was replaced. The reason for Pawłowski's dismissal from the function of a Gdańsk official was discontent with the Prussian authorities, who complained twice to the diocese's administrator, the auxiliary bishop Lewiński, demanding his dismissal since "he doesn't deserve the government's recognition".

Pawłowski gradually left his pastoral duties for the diocesan ones. At first, in 1814, he gave up the parish in Tczew and Lubiszew and, in 1819, resigned from the parish in Miłobądz. He was a parish priest in Izbica for a short period. On 16 November 1821, Pawłowski became the dean of the Włocławek cathedral, the most crucial step in his career. He owed this appointment to Bishop Andrzej Wołłowicz, a close associate of King Stanisław August Poniatowski and the first bishop of the diocese after its reorganisation by the pope within its new borders. Besides managing the cathedral chapter, Pawłowski received the post of a member of the Catholic clerical section in the Government Commission for Religious Denominations and Public Enlightenment (KRWRiOP). The KRWRiOP, established in 1815, oversaw all religions and denominations in Poland, including supervising and nominating the clergy, matters of religious orders, property issues, and remuneration. This enabled Pawłowski to become a high state official with political influence.

== Episcopate ==
After Mikołaj Jan Manugiewicz, an auxiliary bishop of the Archdiocese of Warsaw, was translated to the office of the bishop of Sejny in 1825, Archbishop Wojciech Skarszewski chose Pawłowski as a new auxiliary bishop, and on 9 April 1827, he was appointed the titular bishop of Duvno. Pawłowski was consecrated in the Archcathedral Basilica of St. John the Baptist on 27 May 1827 with Skarszewski as the principal consecrator and Bishop Adam Michal Prażmowski of Płock and Bishop Józef Marcelin Dzięcielski of Lublin as the co-consecrators.

Pawłowski soon became Prażmowski's coadjutor bishop on 21 May 1829, and with Prażmowski's death on 6 February 1836, Pawłowski became the diocesan bishop of Płock. Nevertheless, he continued to live in Warsaw, from where he administered the diocese of Płock until 22 May 1836, when he took over the diocese. Pawłowski was awarded the Order of Saint Stanislaus with the Star in 1929 by Emperor Nicholas I of Russia, while he received the Order with the Grand Ribbon in 1835. Zdzisław Ossowski suggests that Pawłowski was awarded for his work in the KRWRiOP. He was awarded the Order of Saint Anna 1st Class in 1840. During his four-month stay in Saint Petersburg in 1842, where he arrived at the special invitation of the Emperor, Pawłowski received the Order of Saint Anna with the Imperial Crown. Jan Ziółek wrote that the award was, among other intentions, the Emperor's message to the Holy See of how much the representatives of the Catholic Church are respected in Russia.

Pawłowski died in Warsaw, and the funeral was held on 10 July 1852 in Płock.

== Footnotes ==
Catholic Church titles
Preceded by Joseph Chrysostomus Pauer	Bishop of Duvno; 1827–1836	Succeeded by Johann Aloys Hoffmann
Preceded by Adam Michal Prażmowski	Bishop of Płock; 1836–1852	Succeeded by Wincenty Teofil Chosciak-Popiel
