= Michał Franciszek Karpowicz =

Polish Roman Catholic bishop

- Bishop of Wigry
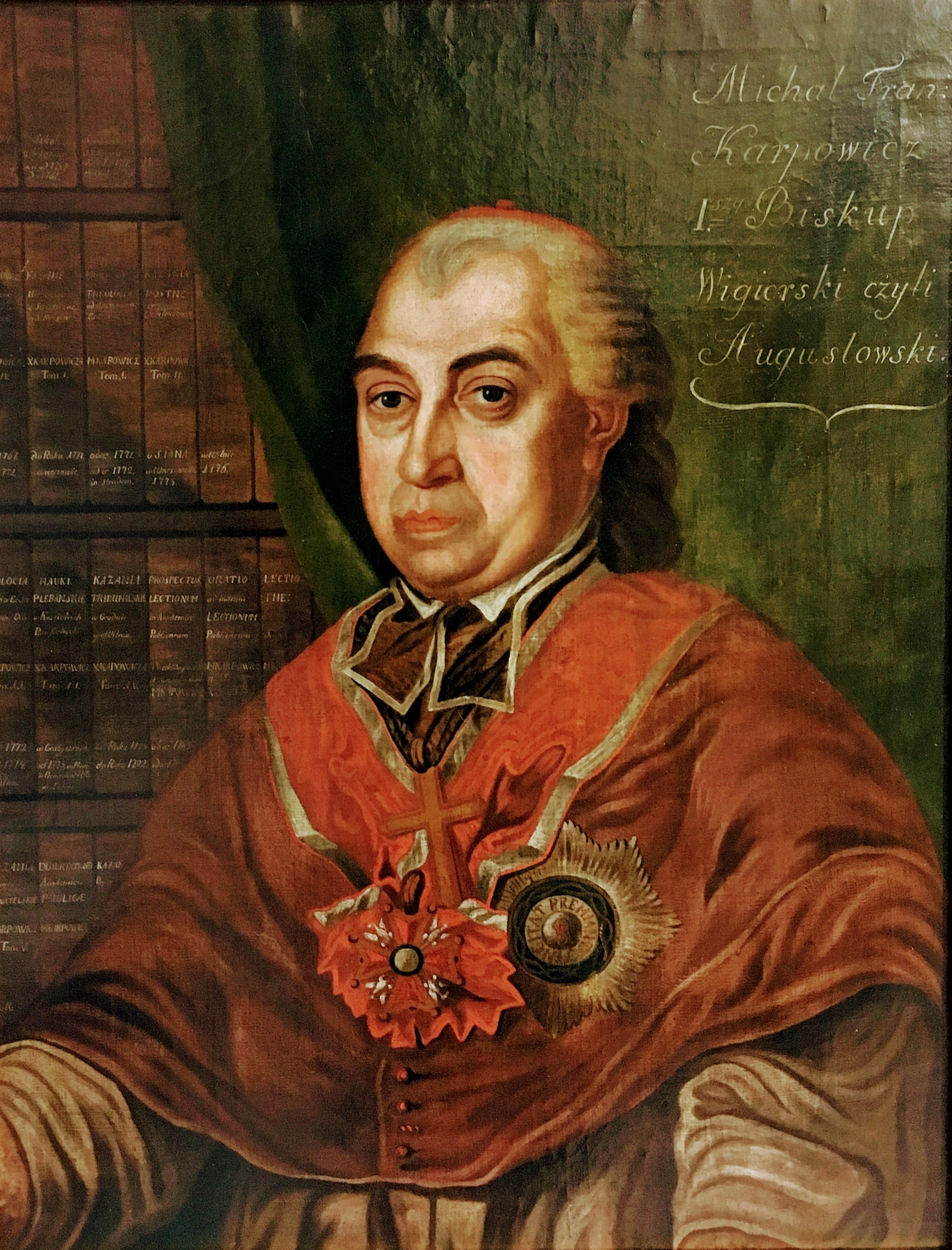
- Appointed: 5 April 1799
- Successor: Jan Klemens Gołaszewski

Orders
- Ordination: 1767
- Consecration: 30 March 1800 by John Baptist Albertrandi

Personal details
- Born: 4 October 1744 Kamyenyets, Brest Litovsk Voivodeship, Grand Duchy of Lithuania, Polish–Lithuanian Commonwealth
- Died: 5 November 1803 (aged 59) Berżniki

Michał Franciszek Karpowicz (Lithuanian: Mykolas Pranciškus Karpavičius; 4 October 1744 – 5 November 1803) was a professor of the Vilnius University, participant of the Kościuszko Uprising (1794), and Roman Catholic bishop of the diocese of Wigry. Karpowicz is regarded as the most famous preacher of the Age of Enlightenment in Lithuania and the Polish–Lithuanian Commonwealth. He delivered sermons for ~20 years to the noble participants of the sessions of the Lithuanian Tribunal. His ancestors were Lithuanian nobles which are known since the 15th century.

== Biography ==
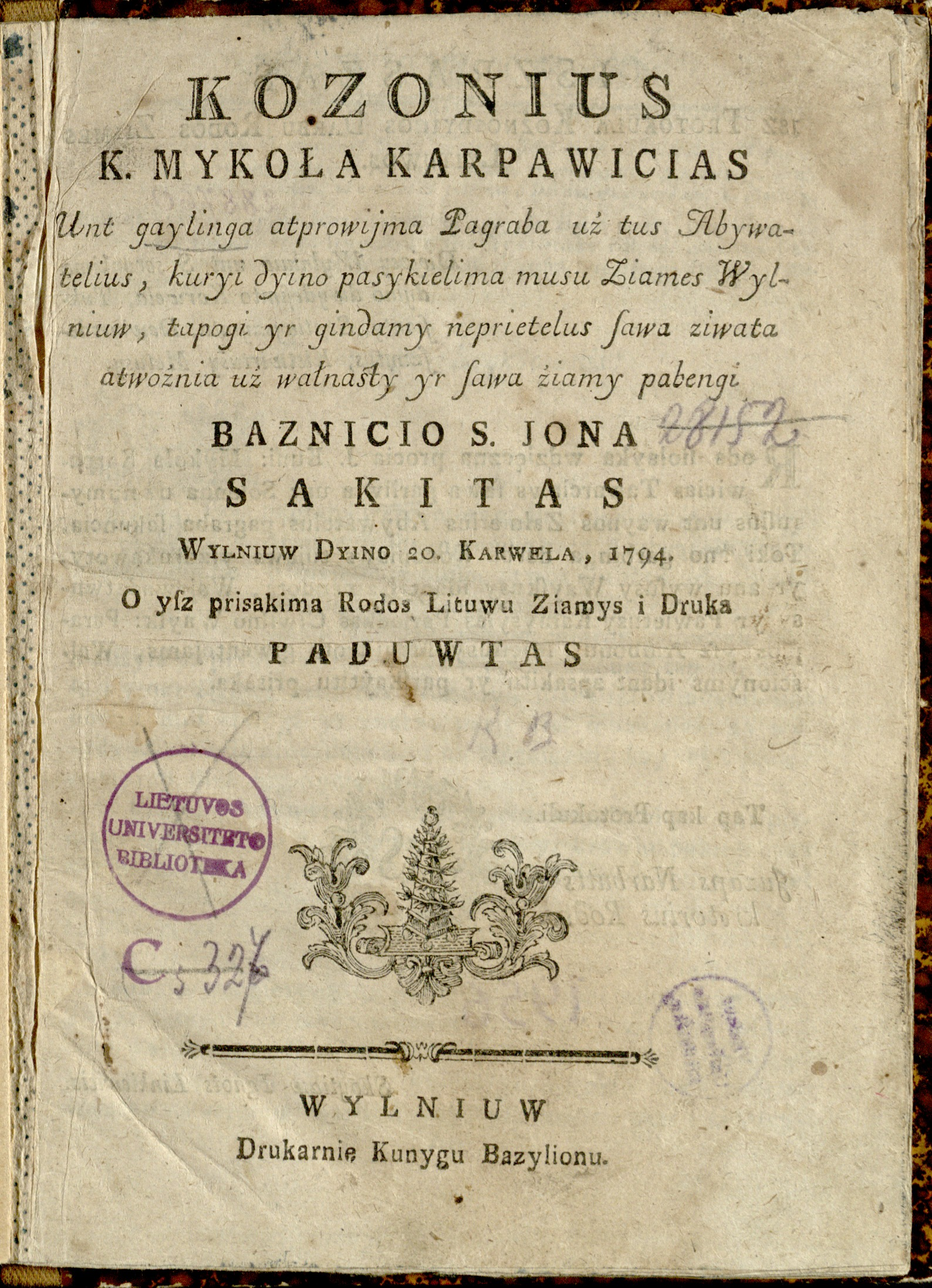
Karpowicz's sermon in Lithuanian language, dedicated to the 1794 Vilnius uprising

Karpowicz was born in Kamyenyets, in the Brest Litovsk Voivodeship of the Grand Duchy of Lithuania. He was educated between 1757 and 1761 by the Jesuits, entering a Vincentian seminary in Warsaw on 26 July 1761. He was ordained a priest in 1767 and continued to learn philosophy at the Vincentian seminary between 1767 and 1771, after which he taught theology at a seminary in Kraków until 1772. Karpowicz graduated from Vilnius University with a doctorate in theology on 5 August 1774, and was made archdeacon of Smolensk in 1776.

On 22 November 1783, Karpowicz was made professor of dogmatic theology at Vilnius University. He was also made a canon of Poznan the same year. Karpowicz was appointed bishop of the Diocese of Wigry on 5 April 1799. He was consecrated on 30 March 1800 in Holy Cross Church by John Baptist Albertrandi, co-consecrated by Tomasz Ostaszewski and Adam Michał Prażmowski. He died on 5 November 1803 in Berżniki and was buried on 12 December 1803 at the monastery in Wigry.
