= Łętowo-Dąb =

- Village
- Location within Poland
- Coordinates: 53°1′N 22°21′E
- Country: Poland
- Voivodeship: Podlaskie
- County: Zambrów
- Gmina: Kołaki Kościelne

Łętowo-Dąb [wɛnˈtɔvɔ ˈdɔmp] is a village in the administrative district of Gmina Kołaki Kościelne, within Zambrów County, Podlaskie Voivodeship, in north-eastern Poland.

== Notable people ==
- Romuald Jałbrzykowski, Polish Catholic bishop
