= Feliks Łukasz Lewiński =

Polish Roman Catholic bishop (1751 – 1825)

- Bishop of Podlachia
- Appointed: 30 March 1819
- Successor: Jan Marceli Gutkowski
- Previous posts: Auxiliary bishop of Kujawy-Pomorze (1795 – 1818); Titular bishop of Erythae (1795 – 1818)

Orders
- Ordination: 4 January 1776 by Jan Dembowski
- Consecration: 19 March 1795 by Jan Rybiński

Personal details
- Born: 24 October 1751 Lewino
- Died: 5 April 1825 (aged 73) Święte

Feliks Łukasz Lewiński, Brochwicz III coat of arms (24 October 1751 – 5 April 1825) was a Polish Roman Catholic bishop of the Diocese of Podlachia from 1818 until his death in 1825. He previously served as the auxiliary bishop of the Diocese of Kujawy-Pomorze from 1795 to 1818.

== Biography ==
Feliks Lewiński was born in Lewino to Franciszek and Konstancja Lewiński. He was a descendent of the Brochwicz szlachta family. He was first educated at a Jesuit college in Stare Szkoty and later entered into the diocesan seminary at Włocławek on 12 September 1775. He was ordained a priest on 4 January 1776 at Włocławek Cathedral by Jan Dembowski. After his ordination, he studied at Jagiellonian University (then called Kraków Academy), where he obtained a doctorate in both laws. He was appointed canon of the Diocese of Włocławek in 1783 and served as chancellor of the diocesan consistory from 1787 to 1797. In 1788 and 1789, he served as a deputy of the Crown Tribunal.

On 11 May 1790, Lewiński was appointed parish priest in Gdańsk. He was appointed civil military commissioner for Kujawy Voivodeship in 1791; he was also appointed to the Order of Saint Stanislaus in the same year. On 13 November 1793, he was appointed by Jan Rybiński as auxiliary bishop of the Diocese of Kujawy-Pomorze; he was further appointed as titular bishop of Erythae on 12 September 1794. He was consecrated on 19 March 1795 in Niesułków by Jan Rybiński. His co-consecrators were Iwon Rygowski and Mikołaj Dembowski.

Between 27 February 1796 and 1818, Lewiński served as vicar general of the Diocese. After the death of Jan Rybiński, Lewiński was appointed to serve as apostolic administrator of the Diocese of Kujawy-Pomorze in 1806. On 9 July 1809, he was appointed justice of the peace for the powiat of Radziejów in the Duchy of Warsaw. He was nominated by Tsar Alexander I as bishop of the newly-formed Diocese of Podlachia (the current Diocese of Siedlce) on 11 August 1818, in accordance with article 42 of the Constitution of the Kingdom of Poland. He was officially appointed by Pope Pius VII through papal bull on 30 March 1819, assuming control of the diocese on 9 October 1819.

As bishop of Podlachia, Lewiński divided the diocese into two deaneries and appointed the first cathedral chapter of the Diocese, consisting of 12 people. On 11 May 1819, he was appointed to serve in the 1820 term of the Sejm of Congress Poland and awarded the Order of Saint Anna. As a senator, he sat on commissions for religious denominations and public education. He died on 5 April 1825 at Święte and was buried at the cathedral in Janów Podlaski.
