= Tigisis in Mauretania =

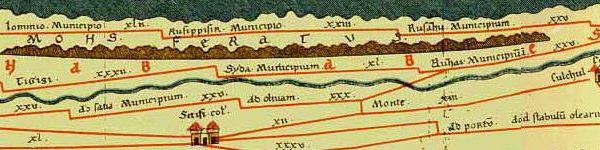
Detail of the Tabula Peutingeriana showing "Tigisi"

Tigisis, also known as Tigisis in Mauretania to distinguish it from another Tigisis in Numidia, was an ancient Berber town (civitas) in the province of Mauretania Caesariensis. It was mentioned in the Antonine Itinerary.

Tigisis is identified with ruins situated between present-day Dellys and Taourga in Algeria.

== Diocese ==
The city was also the seat of an ancient diocese. There are three known bishops of this diocese. The rival Catholic and Donatist bishops Solemnio and Pascasio both attended the 411 Council of Carthage, which gathered together the bishops of Roman North Africa. Passinato intervened at the 484 Council of Carthage called by the Vandal king Huneric, after which he was exiled.

Today, Tigisis in Mauritania survives as titular see (Latin: Tigistanus in Mauretania; Italian: Tigisi di Mauritania) in the Roman Catholic Church. The current bishop is Tadeusz Bronakowski, auxiliary bishop of Łomża.

=== Bishops ===
==== Ancient diocese ====
Three bishops of the town are known to us from antiquity:

- Solemnius (fl. 411), Catholic bishop
- Paschasius (fl. 411), a rival Donatist bishop
- Passitanus (fl. 484)

==== Titular diocese ====
- Rodrigo Vicente Cisneros Durán (1 December 1967 – 4 July 1969)
- Herbé Seijas (2 July 1975 – 15 October 1975 )
- Alejandro Mestre Descals (6 March 1976 – 26 June 1988)
- Martino Canessa (20 June 1989 – 2 February 1996)
- Thomas Koorilos Chakkalapadickal (9 May 1997 – 15 January 2003)
- Tadeusz Bronakowski (11 February 2006 – present)
