= Majdan Sobieszczański =

- Village
- Location within Poland
- Coordinates: 51°3′N 22°21′E
- Country: Poland
- Voivodeship: Lublin
- County: Lublin
- Gmina: Niedrzwica Duża

Majdan Sobieszczański (Polish pronunciation: [ˈmajdan sɔbjɛʂˈtʂaj̃skʲi]) is a village in the administrative district of Gmina Niedrzwica Duża, within Lublin County, Lublin Voivodeship, in eastern Poland.

Bishop Stanisław Stefanek was born in Majdan Sobieszczański in 1936.
