= Roman Catholic Diocese of Wigry =

Former Roman Catholic diocese in Poland

Diocese of Wigry Dioecesis Vigierscensis

Information
- Formation: 1799
- Sui iuris church: Latin Church
- Dissolved: 1818

The Diocese of Wigry (Latin: Dioecesis Vigierscensis) was a diocese of the Catholic Church. It was established in 1799 and was replaced in 1818 by the Diocese of Sejny or Augustów.

== History ==
The Diocese of Wigry was established on 16 March 1799, via the papal bull Saepe factum est. The need to form the diocese came after the Third Partition of Poland, when the bishops of Vilnius, Lutsk and Samogitia were unable to effectively administer their territories in Prussia. The diocese originally included 90 parishes from the Diocese of Vilnius, 44 parishes from the Diocese of Lutsk and 15 parishes from the Diocese of Samogitia. The formation of the Diocese of Wigry was announced through the papal bull Prospiciendo feliciati fidelium on 11 July 1800. In 1807, following the creation of the Duchy of Warsaw, 53 parishes from the diocese were annexed by the Diocese of Vilnius.

The Diocese of Wigry ceased to exist on 30 June 1818 as a result of the papal bull Ex imposita nobis, which established the Diocese of Sejny or Augustów in its place.

== Bishops ==
The following people served as bishops of Wigry:

- Michał Franciszek Karpowicz (28 March 1799 – 5 November 1803)
- Jan Klemens Gołaszewski (27 June 1805 – 30 June 1818), later bishop of Sejny
