= Janusz Stepnowski =

21st-century Polish Catholic bishop

Mgr. Janusz Stepnowski
- Bishop of Łomża
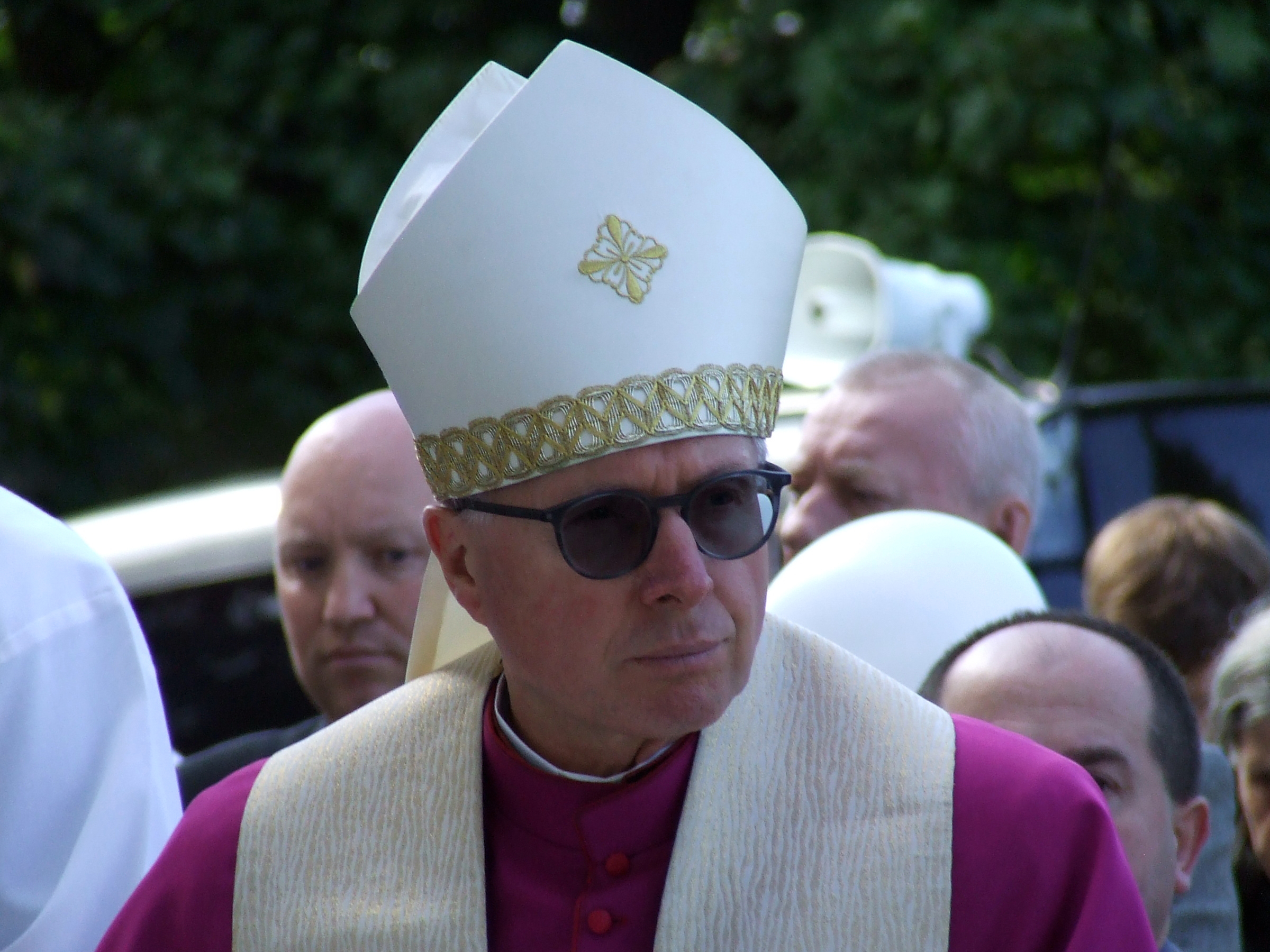
- Stepnowski in 2017
- Church: Roman Catholic Church
- Archdiocese: Przemyśl
- In office: 2011 –
- Predecessor: Stanisław Stefanek
- Previous post: Doctor of Canon Law

Orders
- Ordination: 1 June 1985 by Juliusz Paetz
- Consecration: 18 December 2011 by Marc Ouellet
- Rank: Bishop

Personal details
- Born: 11 July 1958 (age 67) Ostrołęka, Poland
- Motto: Gratia et Pax
- Coat of arms

Janusz Bogusław Stepnowski (born 11 July 1958) is a Polish Roman Catholic bishop, being the head of the Roman Catholic Diocese of Łomża since 2011. He was previously a doctor of canon law.

== Biography ==
=== Early life ===
Stepnowski was born in the city of Ostrołęka. In his youth he studied mechanical engineering at the local vocational school. He graduated with a technical degree specializing in engineering from the Vocational School Complex No. 2 in Ostrołęka. In 1979 he passed the secondary school-leaving examination. During his studies he did basic military service for 6 months in the clerical unit in Bartoszyce. He was ordained a priest on 1 June 1985 for the diocese of Łomża by the diocesan bishop Juliusz Paetz. After ordination Stepnowski obtained a master's degree in theology at the Catholic University of Lublin, continued his studies at the University of Navarra in Pamplona, where he graduated with a doctorate in canon law in 1988. From 1988 to 1989 he undertook additional studies at the University for Foreigners in Perugia.

=== Priestly ministry ===
During his studies in Italy, Stepnowski served as a part-time pastor for the Roman Catholic Diocese of Terni. In 1990 he became the chaplain of the convent of the Sisters of Mercy in Rome. In 1989 he started working in the Vatican Congregation for Bishops . First he dealt with some Spanish-speaking countries in South America, then for many years he headed the Office for Coordination of Visits "ad limina Apostolorum". During this time he also served as an interpreter for the Roman Rota. In 2005 he was awarded an honorary prelate by Pope John Paul II.

=== Ordination as bishop ===
On 11 November 2011 Stepnowski was appointed as the new bishop of the Łomża by Pope Benedict XVI. On 18 December 2011 Stepnowski was ordained a bishop by Marc Ouellet, the Cardinal prefect of the Congregation for Bishops, with Celestino Migliore, the Apostolic Nuncio in Poland, and Stanisław Stefanek, the retiring diocesan bishop, serving as the co-consicrators. He adopted the phrase "Gratia et Pax" (Grace and Peace) as his bishop's motto.

=== Life as Bishop ===
As part of the Polish Bishops' Conference in 2012, he became a delegate for contacts with Commission of the Bishops' Conferences of the European Community.
