= Sicca Veneria (episcopal see) =

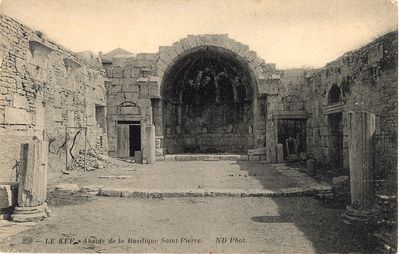
Ruins of Basilica at El Kef (Sicca Veneria).

The Diocese of Sicca Veneria was an episcopal see of Africa Proconsularis, and was a suffragan of the bishops of Carthage. The cathedra of the bishopric was in the Roman colonia (highest ranking city) of Colonia Julia Veneria Cirta Nova Iulia. The bishopric was founded in early Christianity; it ceased to function sometime after the Muslim conquest of the Maghreb.

It exists today as a titular see of the Roman Catholic Church. The current bishop is Lajos Varga of Hungary.

Remains of the bishopric included ruins at El Kef of a cathedral, baptistry, Christian burials, and numerous Christian inscriptions.

== Known bishops ==
=== Antiquity and Early Middle Ages ===
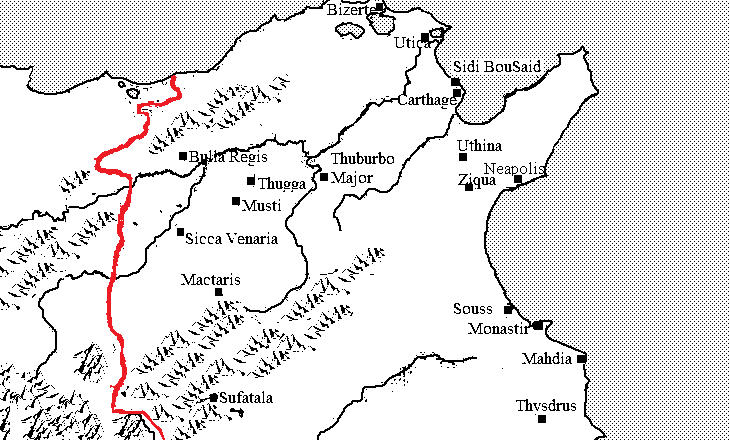
Map of Roman Africa Proconsularae.

- Castus, at the Council of Carthage (255), at which he addressed the meeting
- Patritius mentioned in 349;
- Fortunatianus mentioned in 407, present at the Council of Carthage (411) and spoken of by St. Augustine,
- Urbanus in 418, mentioned in 429 by Augustine,
- Paul towards 480;
- Candidus in 646.

=== Catholic ===
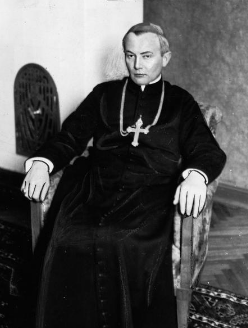
Kazimierz Tomczak

- Gustave Marie Blanche Vicar Apostolic Golfe St-Laurent (Canada) 1905–1916
- Stanislaw Kostka Łukomski auxiliary bishop of Gniezno and Poznań 1920–1926
- Kazimierz Tomczak Auxiliary Bishop of Łódź 1927–1967
- Joseph Augustin Hagendorens (Zaire) 1968–1976
- Felix Eugenio Mkhori (Malawi) 1977–1979
- Kazimierz Romaniuk 1982–1992
- Lajos Varga (Hungary) since May 27, 2006
