= Konstanty Ireneusz Łubieński =

Polish Roman Catholic bishop

- Bishop of Sejny or Augustów
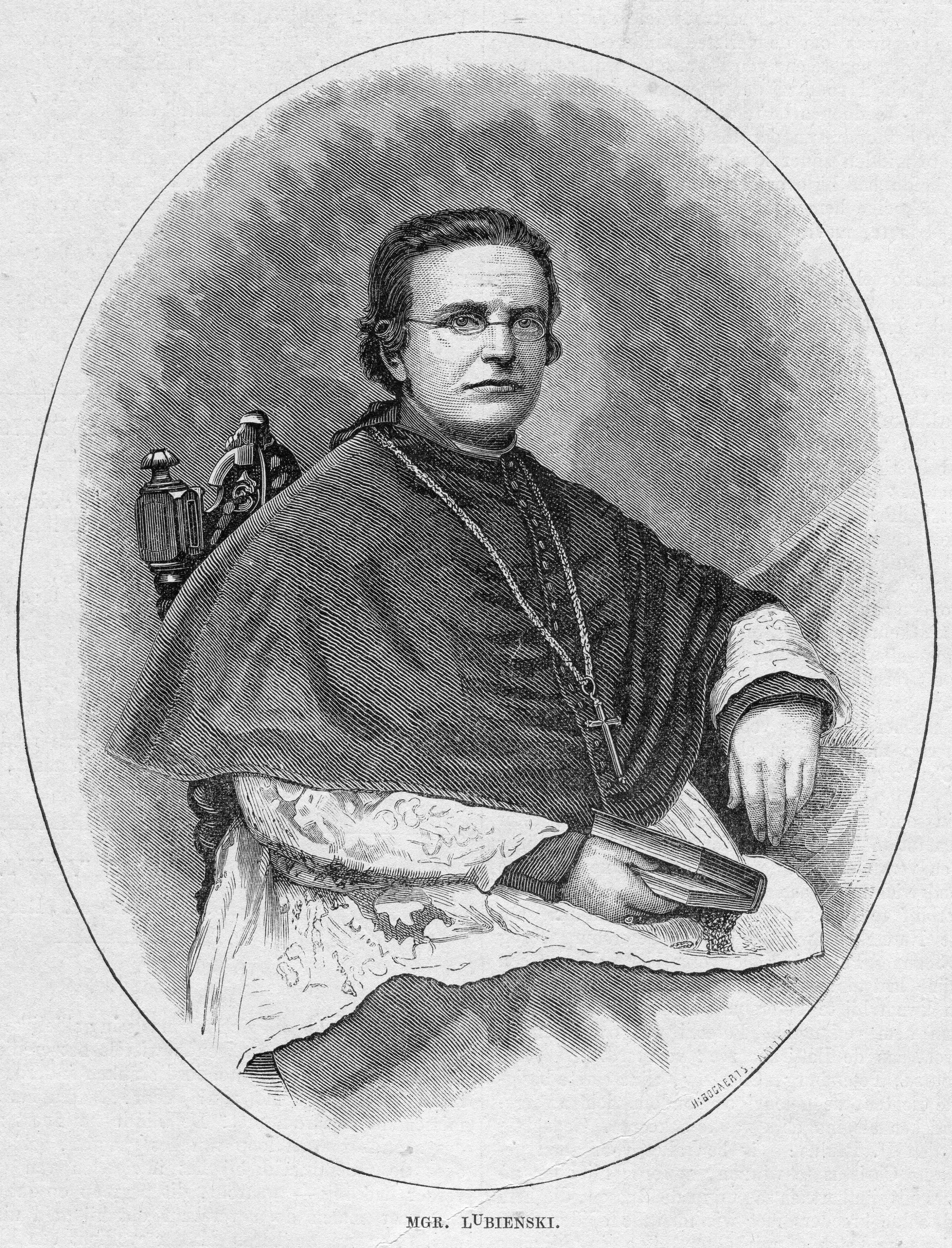
- In office: 3 October 1863 – 16 June 1869
- Predecessor: Paweł Straszyński
- Successor: Piotr Paweł Wierzbowski

Orders
- Ordination: 15 July 1849 by Tadeusz Łubieński
- Consecration: 20 December 1863 by Piotr Szymański

Personal details
- Born: 19 February 1825 Warsaw, Congress Poland
- Died: 16 June 1869 (aged 44) Nizhny Novgorod

Konstanty Ireneusz Łubieński, Pomian coat of arms (19 February 1825 – 16 June 1869) was a Roman Catholic bishop of the Diocese of Sejny or Augustów.

== Biography ==
Łubieński was born in Warsaw. He was the son of Henryk Łubieński, the vice-president of Bank Polski, and Irena Łubieński (née Potocki). After homeschooling and completing a philosophy course in Fribourg, he entered the diocesan seminary of the Diocese of Kielce in 1846. On 5 August 1846, he was given a tonsure and ordained to the minor orders of porter and lector by Tadeusz Łubieński. In 1847, he began attending the seminary at the Church of the Holy Cross in Warsaw; there, he was ordained to the subdiaconate on 20 May 1849 and to the diaconate on 2 August 1849. He was ordained a priest at the Church of the Holy Cross on 15 July 1849 by Tadeusz Łubieński. After his ordination and brief arrest, Łubieński was appointed vicar of the Church of the Holy Cross, as well as its seminary. He served as its vicar until 1850, when he was appointed vicar and administrator for the parish of Wiskitki.

Łubieński was appointed vicar for the Church of St. Catherine in Saint Petersburg in 1854. He was later appointed provost for the Church of St. John of Jerusalem of St. Petersburg in 1858 and provost of the parish in Rewla in 1860. Łubieński was appointed bishop of the Diocese of Sejny or Augustów on 20 March 1863. He was consecrated on 20 December 1863 in Janów Podlaski by Piotr Paweł Benjamin Szymański, bishop of Podlasia, assisted by Józef Twarowski and Henryk Ludwik Plater. He assumed control of the Diocese on 3 October 1863.

As bishop of Sejny or Augustów, Łubieński reformed the diocesan seminary and organized the diocese into 11 diaconates. In the years following the January Uprising, he released an encyclical defending the Catholic Church against the Tsarist government on 19 October 1867. He was arrested and was deported to the interior of Russia on 31 May 1869. He died on 16 June 1869 in prison in Nizhny Novgorod.
