= Piotr Jarecki =

His Excellency, The Most Reverend Piotr Jarecki
- Auxiliary Bishop of Warsaw
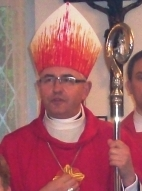
- Church: Catholic Church
- Archdiocese: Warsaw
- Appointed: 16 April 1994
- Installed: 23 April 1994
- Other post: Titular Bishop of Avissa

Orders
- Ordination: 1 June 1980 by Stefan Wyszyński
- Consecration: by Józef Glemp
- Rank: Bishop

Personal details
- Born: 29 June 1955 (age 71) Sierpc
- Education: Pontifical Gregorian University
- Motto: Testimonium perhibere veritati (Giving testimony to the truth)
- Coat of arms

Styles of Piotr Jarecki
- Reference style: His Excellency; The Most Reverend
- Spoken style: Your Excellency
- Religious style: Bishop

Piotr Jarecki (born 29 June 1955) is a Polish prelate of the Catholic Church, Doctor of Social Sciences, Auxiliary Bishop of Warsaw since 1994.

== Biography ==
Piotr Jarecki was born on 29 June 1955 in Sierpc, Poland, where he completed secondary school. He then entered the seminary in Płock, but after two years, he moved to the Higher Archdiocesan Seminary in Warsaw. He was ordained a priest on 1 June 1980 by the Primate of Poland, Cardinal Stefan Wyszyński. After completing his priestly formation, Jarecku received a doctorate in social sciences from the Pontifical Gregorian University.

On 16 April 1994, he was appointed as the Auxiliary Bishop of Warsaw and Titular Bishop of Avissa by Pope John Paul II. He was consecrated on 23 April 1994 by the Primate of Poland and Archbishop of Warsaw Cardinal Józef Glemp.

As a bishop, he currently serves as the Archdeacon of the Warsaw Metropolitan Chapter, Chairman of the Social Council and a member of the Council for Social Communications in the Episcopal Conference of Poland. Jarecki is also a member of the Episcopal Council, the Priestly Council and the College of Consultors of the Archdiocese of Warsaw. He used to be also the vice-president of the Commission of the Bishops' Conferences of the European Community (2006–2012) and the chair of the Apostolic Visit of Benedict XVI in 2006.

In October 2012, Jarecki was detained by the Polish police for driving under the influence of alcohol and for causing a minor accident and crashing into a lamp in the centre of Warsaw. Jarecku was sentenced to six months' imprisonment with conditional suspension of his performance for a two-year trial period, a fine, a four-year driving ban and a payment to benefit the Victims Assistance Fund and Post-Penitentiary Assistance. After the road accident, he ceased to perform the duties of the bishop since after the verdict of the court, the Holy See suspended him in episcopal functions. In March 2015, he temporarily resumed the duties of auxiliary bishop, and in November 2015 he was permanently restored to work in the archdiocese and again took office as vicar general.
