= Antanas Karosas =

Roman Catholic bishop (1856–1947)

- Bishop of Vilkaviškis
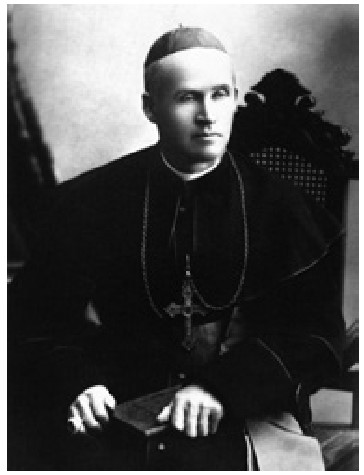
- Previous posts: Bishop of Sejny (1910–1926); Auxiliary bishop of Lutsk-Zhytomyr (1907–1910); Titular bishop of Dorylaeum (1907–1910)

Orders
- Ordination: 6 June 1883
- Consecration: 16 June 1907 by Mečislovas Leonardas Paliulionis

Personal details
- Born: 27 February 1856 Vėjeliškiai, Russian Empire
- Died: 6 July 1947 (aged 91) Marijampolė, Lithuanian SSR

Antanas Karosas (Polish: Antoni Karaś; 27 February 1856 – 6 July 1947) was the Roman Catholic bishop of the Diocese of Sejny from 1910 to 1926 and of the Diocese of Vilkaviškis from its establishment in 1926 until his death in 1947.

== Biography ==
=== Early life and career ===
Karosas was born in 1856 in Vėjeliškiai to Jonas Karonas and Marijona Miškeliūnaitė-Karosienė. After attending a gymnasium in Šiauliai, he attended the seminary in Kaunas from 1876 to 1879. He later attended the Saint Petersburg Roman Catholic Theological Academy from 1879 until 1883, from which he received a magister degree in theology. He was ordained a priest on 6 June 1883. In fall 1883, he was invited to teach canon law and the Latin language at the seminary in Kaunas. Beginning in 1884, he began to teach homiletics and the Lithuanian language at the same seminary. He also served as secretary to Mečislovas Leonardas Paliulionis beginning in 1885, where he managed relations with Russian officials.

On 9 April 1898, Karosas was appointed a canon capitular of the Diocese of Samogitia. He was appointed rector of the seminary at Kaunas on 27 October 1900; serving until 1907. On 8 November 1906, he was appointed auxiliary bishop of the Diocese of Lutsk-Zhytomyr and titular bishop of Dorylaeum; he was consecrated on 16 June 1907 in St. Petersburg by Mečislovas Leonardas Paliulionis and co-consecrated by Karol Antoni Niedziałkowski and Kasper Felicjan Cyrtowt.

=== Bishop of Sejny ===
On 7 April 1910, Karosas was appointed bishop of the Diocese of Sejny; he assumed control of the diocese on 29 July 1910. During his time as bishop of Sejny, he worked to improve the catechization of children and religious education. He also established a Lithuanian seminary in Sejny in 1918, which displeased the Poles that lived there. After the Sejny Uprising in 1919, Karosas and other Lithuanian clerics were expelled from the town; he stayed at a rectory at Puńsk for some time and in 1920 moved to Marijampolė, where he resided at a Marian monastery.

=== Bishop of Vilkaviškis ===
On 5 April 1926, Karosas was appointed the first bishop of the Diocese of Vilkaviškis; during his tenure, he established a diocesan curia, remodeled its cathedral, and built premises for Vilkaviškis Priest Seminary in 1930. He was appointed assistant to the papal throne on 14 September 1932. In 1933, he was appointed Prelate of Honour of His Holiness and Roman count, after the 50th anniversary of his ordination. During World War II, he lived in Vilkaviškis during the Soviet and German occupations of Lithuania, moving to Šunskai in 1944 and back to Marijampolė in 1946. He died on 7 July 1947 in Marijampolė and was buried at the cathedral located there.
