= Ignacy Stanisław Czyżewski =

Polish Roman Catholic bishop

- Bishop of Sejny
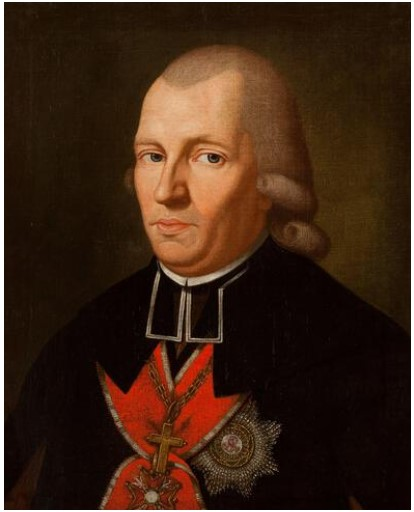
- Predecessor: Jan Klemens Gołaszewski
- Successor: Mikołaj Jan Manugiewicz

Orders
- Ordination: 26 August 1767
- Consecration: 6 August 1820 by Adam Michał Prażmowski

Personal details
- Born: 5 December 1753 Kalisz
- Died: 11 December 1823 (aged 70) Warsaw

Ignacy Stanisław Czyżewski (5 December 1753 – 11 December 1823) was a bishop of the Roman Catholic Diocese of Sejny.

== Biography ==
Czyżewski was born in Kalisz. On 26 August 1767, he was ordained a Jesuit priest; he later attended Jagellonian University, where he received doctorates in law & canon law. He was later made regent of the chancellory of the diocese of Kujawy, by orders of its bishop, Józef Ignacy Rybiński. On 26 April 1787, he was made a canon of the cathedral of Włocławek.

In 1820, Czyżewski was appointed coadjutor bishop of the Diocese of Sejny by Jan Klemens Gołaszewski. After Gołaszewski's death, Czyżewski was appointed bishop of Sejny on 19 May 1820; he was consecrated on 6 August of the same year by Adam Michał Prażmowski, the bishop of Płock, assisted by Feliks Łukasz Lewiński and Józef Marcelin Dzięcielski. He died on 11 December 1823 in Warsaw.
