= Kazimierz Tomczak =

Polish bishop, theologian and teacher

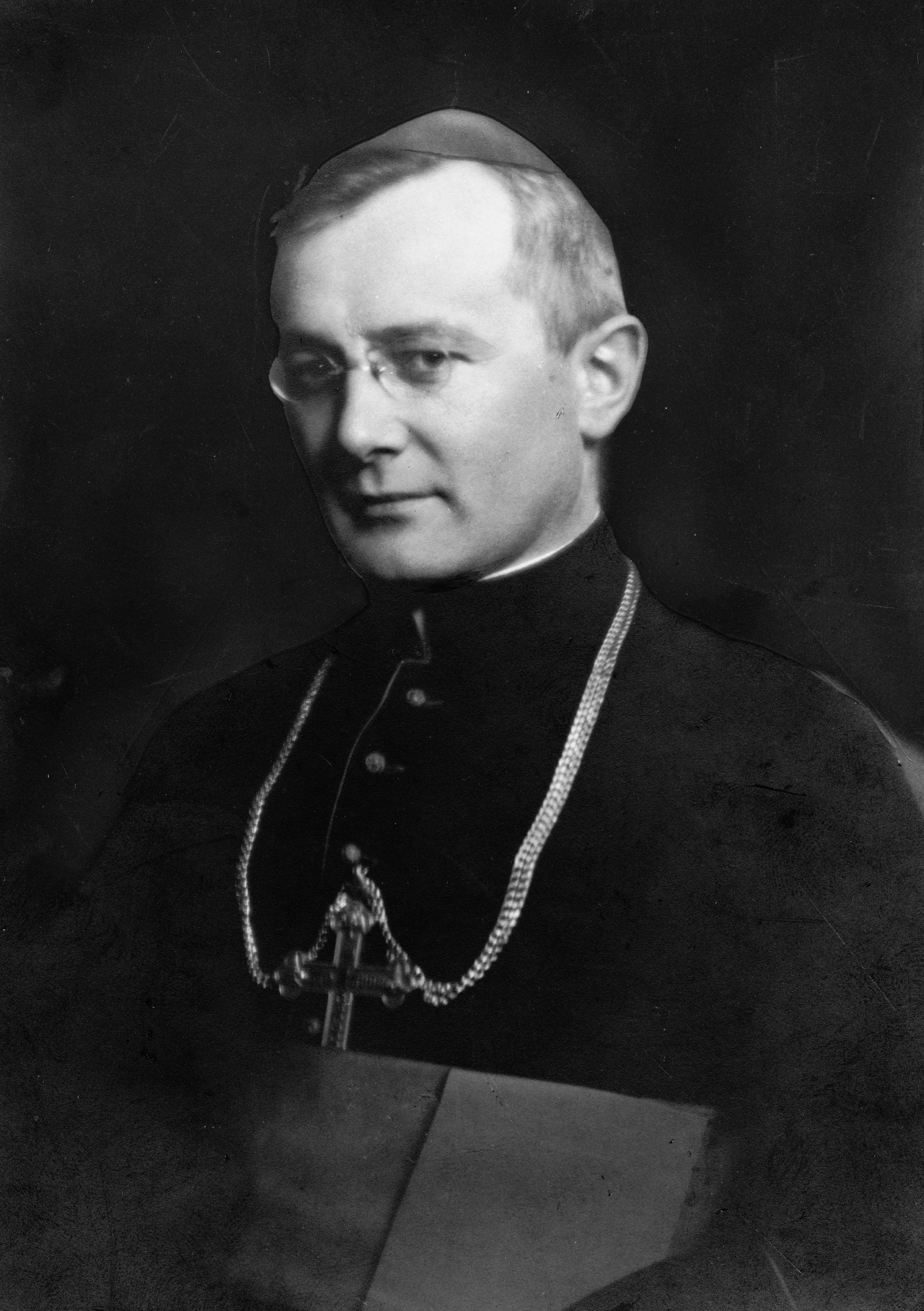
Kazimierz Tomczak

Kazimierz Tomczak (1883–1967) was a 20th-century Polish bishop theologian and teacher, interned by the Nazi forces during World War II.

He was born on 17 February 1883 in Besiekierz and studied at the Jesuit School in Chyrów, where he graduated from high school. He studied also at the Saint Petersburg Roman Catholic Theological Academy, in Paris, and in Freiburg, and was ordained a priest on 7 January 1907.

For 16 years he worked as a professor at the Warsaw Seminary, where he taught moral theology, the history of philosophy, archaeology, Christian liturgy and literature. In 1936, he was one of the founders of the Society of Friends of Science in Łódź.

On 25 February 1927, Pope Pius XII appointed him the first auxiliary bishop of the diocese of Łódź and titular bishop of Sicca Veneria. He was ordained bishop on 3 April 1927 in Warsaw Cathedral by cardinal Aleksander Kakowski.

On 6 September 1939, after the Invasion of Poland, he headed the Citizens' Committee of Łódź with the task of keeping law and order after the Polish authorities fled the city and representing city residents to the German occupation authorities. He was arrested on 9 November 1939 during a large operation by Łódź Gestapo against the local intelligentsia, part of the so-called Intelligenzaktion. He was sent for several days to a transit camp factory and then released but placed under house arrest in the building of the Łódź Episcopal Curia.

On 6 May 1941, together with Włodzimierz Jasiński, members of the Cathedral Chapter and the employees of the episcopal curia, he was interned by the Nazis. He was detained in the monastery of the Franciscan Friars Minor in Biecz. In 1943, he moved to Warsaw where he stayed until January 1945. After the war, he returned to Łódź.

On 20 October 1957, during a sermon in Piotrków Trybunalski at the dedication of an altar, he suffered a brain hemorrhage, which resulted in paralysis. He died on 21 October 1967. He was buried in the Old Cemetery in Łódź.
