= Stanisław Kostka Łukomski =

Polish Catholic bishop (1874 – 1948)

- Bishop of Łomża
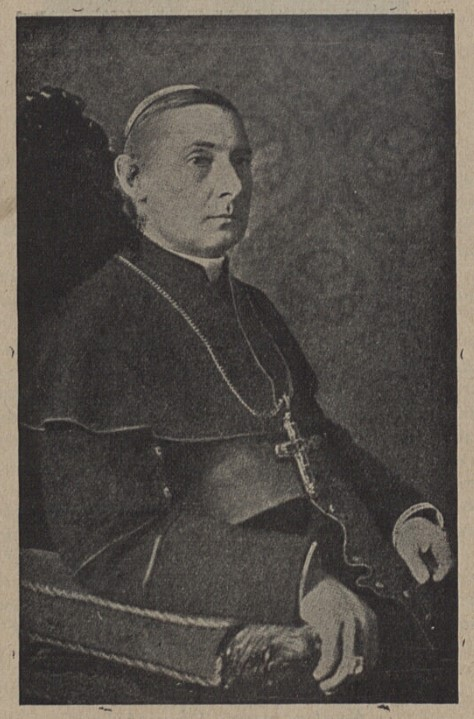
- Church: Catholic Church
- Diocese: Diocese of Łomża
- In office: 24 June 1926 – 28 October 1948
- Predecessor: Romuald Jałbrzykowski
- Successor: Czesław Falkowski
- Previous posts: Titular Bishop of Sicca Veneria (1920-1926); Auxiliary Bishop of Gniezno and Poznań (1920-1926)

Orders
- Ordination: 24 February 1898
- Consecration: 23 May 1920 by Adolf Szelążek

Personal details
- Born: 21 October 1874 Borek, Province of Posen, Kingdom of Prussia, German Empire
- Died: 28 October 1948 (aged 74) Polish People's Republic

Stanisław Kostka Łukomski (21 October 1874 – 28 October 1948) was a leading Polish bishop and right-wing political activist. He died in suspicious circumstances shortly after World War II.

He was born in the village of Borek in Sadki parish of the Archdiocese of Gniezno on October 21, 1874. On February 24, 1898, he was ordained a priest.

Łukomski became a member of the National League in 1900. On March 8, 1920, he was appointed auxiliary bishop of Archdiocese of Sicca Veneria. After the death of Cardinal Edmund Dalbor in 1926, he managed the archdiocese as Vicar Capitular for a short time. On 29 December 1921, he was awarded the Commander's Cross of the Order of Polonia Restituta.

On June 24, 1926, was made bishop of the Diocese of Łomża, where he coordinated the work of the diocesan Catholic Action group and contributed to the expansion of the cathedral. 1926 also saw him serve as secretary of the Polish Episcopal Conference. He resigned from this role in 1936, but his resignation was not adopted until May 1946.

Known for his extreme right-wing political views, Łukomski sympathized with the National Democratic Party and was a strong opponent of Jozef Pilsudski. In 1922, he condemned the general agriculture strike in Wielkopolska, which was one of the reasons for its failure. In 1947, he wrote a letter to the Communist authorities and condemned murders in Zawady (including the governor) by the "underground army national" militia.

In 1948, Łukomski became the most serious candidate for the office of the Archbishop of Gniezno and therefore Primate of Poland with the death of August Hlond. He remained a staunch opponent of the newly ascendent communist authorities. On October 28, 1948, he died in an unexplained car accident on the Ostrów Wielkopolski–Łomża road, which some believe to have been an assassination.

He was buried on November 4, 1948 in Łomża Cathedral.
