= Lewino =

- Village
- Location within Poland
- Coordinates: 54°26′53″N 18°5′31″E
- Country: Poland
- Voivodeship: Pomeranian
- County: Wejherowo
- Gmina: Linia
- Population: 290

Lewino [lɛˈvinɔ] is a village in the administrative district of Gmina Linia, within Wejherowo County, Pomeranian Voivodeship, in northern Poland.

For details of the history of the region, see History of Pomerania.

Lewino – an early medieval barrow cemetery in the Pomeranian Voivodeship, excavated in 2005–2007, 2009, 2011, and 2012. The necropolis consists of 15 barrows: 10 oval and 5 square, making it one of the few securely documented examples of a mixed-form cemetery. Lewino belongs to the group of sites classified as Orzeszkowo-type cemeteries, which are characteristic exclusively of Pomerania.

Although these sites belong to the most intriguing categories of early medieval funerary monuments, they have not been extensively studied in recent decades. An exception is the cemetery at Nowy Chorów in Słupsk County, Kępice Commune.
