= Mieczki, Łomża County =

Village in Gmina Przytuły, Poland

Mieczki
- Village
- Location within Poland
- Coordinates: 53°20′28″N 22°17′06″E
- Country: Poland
- Voivodeship: Podlaskie
- County: Łomża
- Gmina: Przytuły

Mieczki [ˈmjɛt͡ʂki] is a village in the administrative district of Gmina Przytuły, within Łomża County, Podlaskie Voivodeship, in north-eastern Poland.

According to the 2021 census, the village had 77 inhabitants, indicating a decline from the 2011 census, which recorded 89 residents.

The village covers 3.76 km^{2}, and it remains part of the Gmina Przytuły administrative district in the Łomza County of north-eastern Poland.
