= Tadeusz Józef Zawistowski =

Polish Roman Catholic bishop

Tadeusz Zawistowski
- Auxiliary bishop of Łomża
- In office: May 12, 1973 – February 11, 2006
- Other post: Titular bishop of Hospita (1973–2015)

Orders
- Ordination: July 3, 1955 by Czesław Falkowski
- Consecration: June 29, 1973 by Pope Paul VI

Personal details
- Born: Tadeusz Józef Zawistowski; January 16, 1930 Sztabin, Second Polish Republic
- Died: June 1, 2015 (aged 85) Łomża, Poland
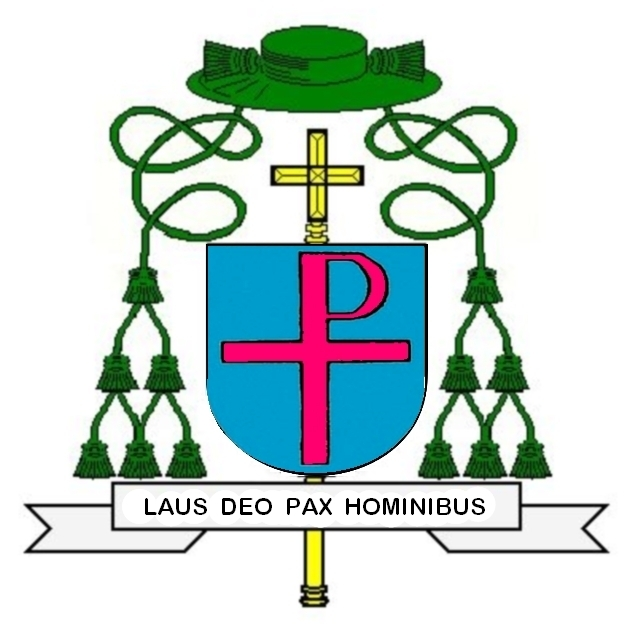
- Coat of arms

Tadeusz Józef Zawistowski (16 January 1930 – 1 June 2015) was a Polish Roman Catholic bishop.

He was born in Sztabin and ordained a priest in 1955. Zawistowski was appointed to concurrent posts as the auxiliary bishop of Łomża and the titular bishop of Hospita in 1973. He retired in 2006 and died in 2015.
