= Jan Klemens Gołaszewski =

Polish Roman Catholic bishop (1748–1820)

- Bishop of Sejny
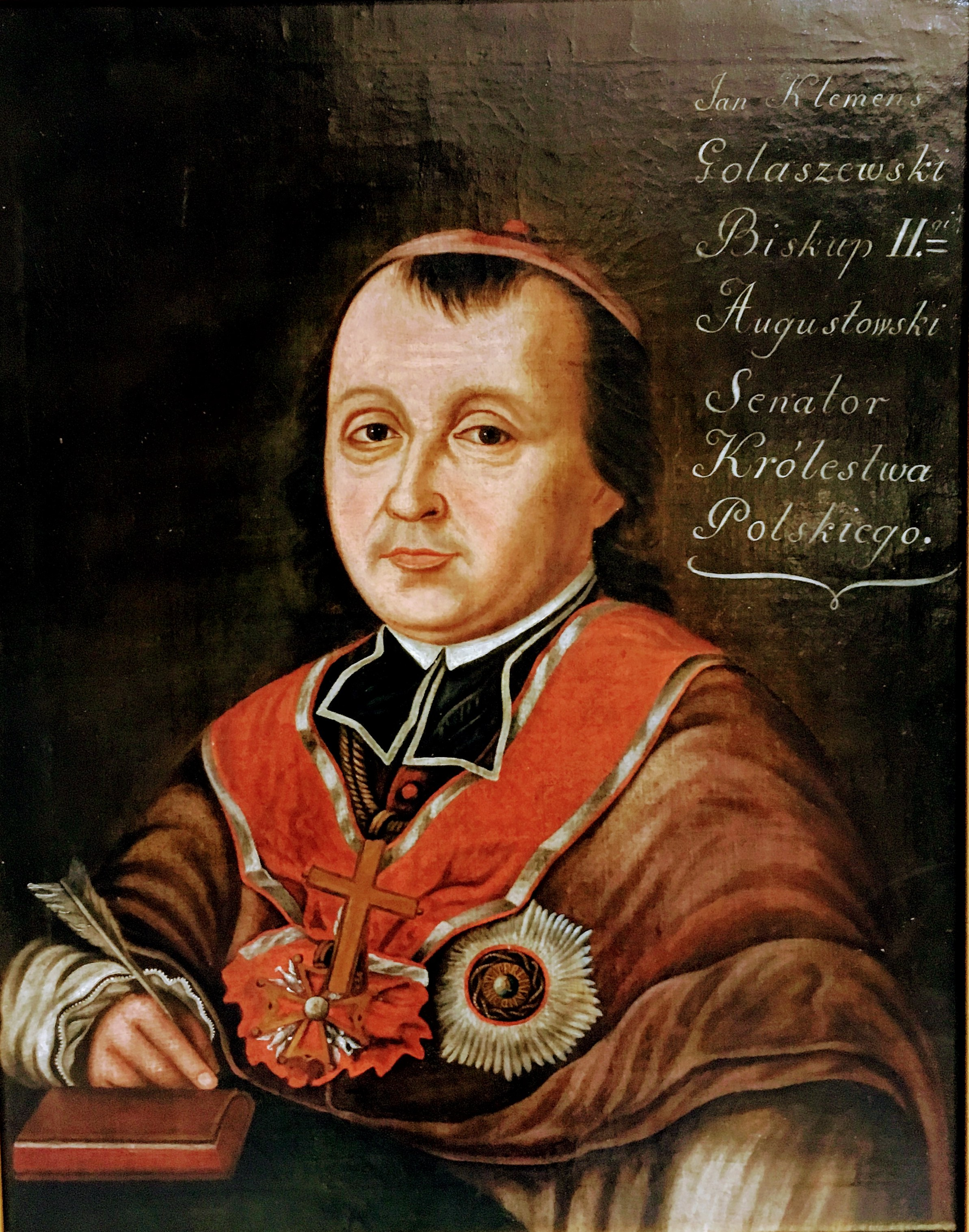
- Successor: Ignacy Stanisław Czyżewski
- Previous post(s): Bishop of Wigry (1805 – 1818)

Orders
- Ordination: 1771
- Consecration: 5 March 1809 by Ignacy Raczyński

Personal details
- Born: 23 November 1748; Kowalewszczyzna
- Died: 8 March 1820 (aged 71); Warsaw

Jan Klemens Gołaszewski (23 November 1748 – 8 March 1820) was a Roman Catholic bishop of Sejny.

== Biography ==
Gołaszewski was born in 1748 to Francziszek and Joanna Gołaszewski. He began attending a college of the Congregation of the Mission in Warsaw in 1764; he professed his religious vows on 24 November 1766 and was ordained a priest in 1771. While a Vincentian, he served as a professor and preacher; he left the Congregation in 1774. After leaving the Congregation, he served as parish priest in Pawłowice and Waniewo, later being appointed dean in Bielsk Podlaski. On 12 January 1798, Gołaszewski was appointed by Onufry Kajetan Szembek, bishop of Płock, as vicar and administrator of certain territories in the Diocese of Płock. Gołaszewski was appointed vicar general of the Diocese of Wigry in 1800 by Michał Franciszek Karpowicz, who was the diocese's first bishop.

On 26 June 1805, Gołaszewski was appointed bishop of the Diocese of Wigry by Pope Pius VII; he was consecrated on 5 March 1809 in Warsaw by Ignacy Raczyński, with his co-consecrators being Tymoteusz Gorzeński and Antonin Malinowski. He was made a senator of Congress Poland in 1808, which he served as until his death in 1820; while a senator, he served on committees for religion and public blessing, and was later awarded the Order of Saint Stanislaus, 1st class. On 30 June 1818, the Diocese of Wigry was dissolved and Gołaszewski was made bishop of Sejny. He died on 8 March 1820 and was buried at the Church of the Holy Cross on 11 March.
