= Wierzbowo, Łomża County =

Wierzbowo
- Village
- Location within Poland
- Coordinates: 53°04′55″N 21°57′08″E
- Country: Poland
- Voivodeship: Podlaskie
- County: Łomża
- Gmina: Śniadowo

Wierzbowo [vjɛʐˈbɔvɔ] is a village in the administrative district of Gmina Śniadowo, within Łomża County, Podlaskie Voivodeship, in north-eastern Poland.
