= Chwalęcin, Warmian-Masurian Voivodeship =

Chwalęcin
- Village
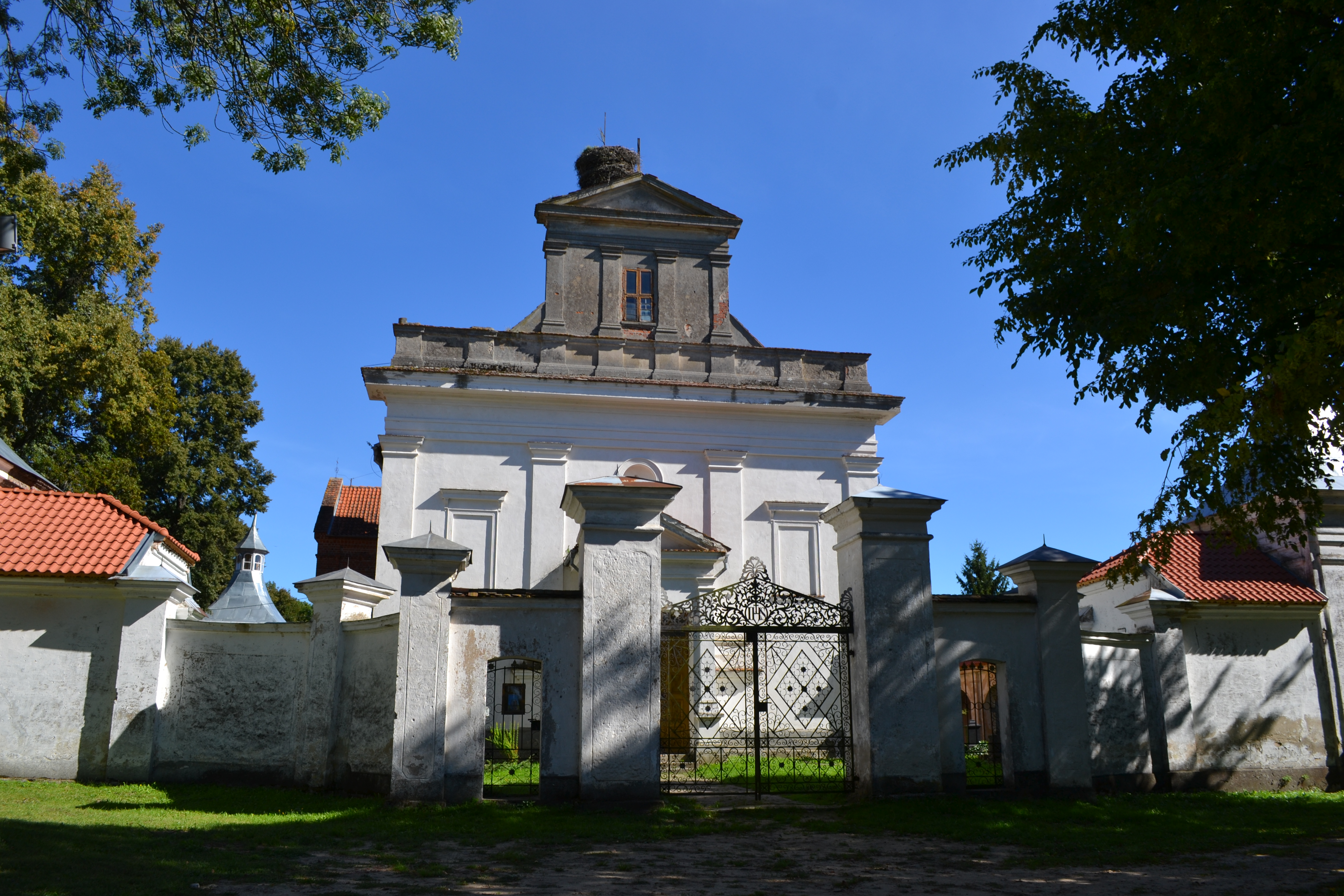
- Church of the Exaltation of the Holy Cross

- Location within Poland
- Coordinates: 54°10′N 20°2′E
- Country: Poland
- Voivodeship: Warmian-Masurian
- County: Lidzbark
- Gmina: Orneta

Population
  - Total: 190

Chwalęcin [xfaˈlɛnt͡ɕin] is a village in the administrative district of Gmina Orneta, within Lidzbark County, Warmian-Masurian Voivodeship, in northern Poland.

Before 1772 the area was part of Kingdom of Poland, and in 1772–1945 it belonged to Prussia and Germany (East Prussia).
