= Stanisław Stefanek =

Polish prelate of the Catholic Church (1936–2020)

His Excellency, The Most Reverend Stanisław Stefanek
- Bishop Emeritus of Łomża
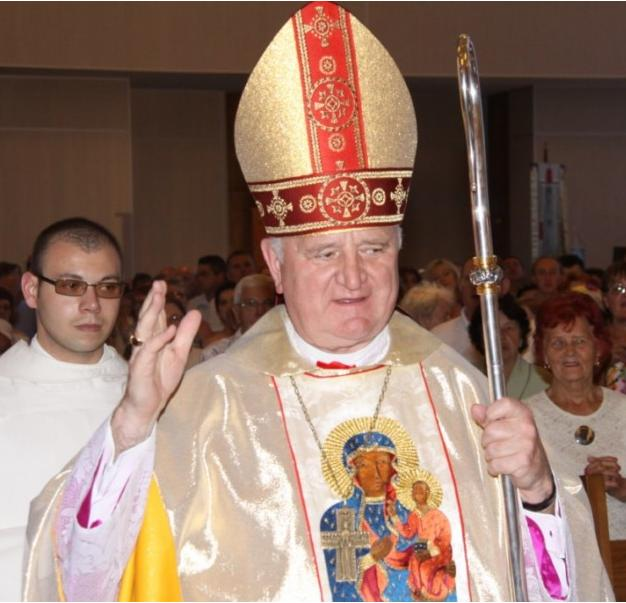
- Archdiocese: Białystok
- Diocese: Łomża
- Appointed: 26 October 1996
- Installed: 28 October 1996
- Term ended: 11 November 2011
- Predecessor: Juliusz Paetz
- Successor: Janusz Stepnowski
- Previous post: Auxiliary bishop of Szczecin-Kamień

Orders
- Ordination: 28 June 1959 by Antoni Baraniak
- Consecration: 24 August 1980 by Kazimierz Majdański, Bolesław Pylak, and Jan Gałecki

Personal details
- Born: 7 May 1936 Majdan Sobieszczański, Poland
- Died: 17 January 2020 (aged 83) Lublin, Poland
- Buried: Cathedral of St. Michael of the Archangel

Stanisław Stefanek (7 May 1936 – 17 January 2020) was a Polish prelate of the Catholic Church.

Born in the village of Majdan Sobieszczański, Stefanek was ordained to the priesthood on 28 June 1959.

He became vicar general of the Society of Christ. He was named an auxiliary bishop of Szczecin-Kamień and titular bishop of Forum Popilii in 1980.

Pope John Paul II appointed him Bishop of Łomża on 26 October 1996. He became embroiled in the controversy of the Jedwabne pogrom from the early 2000, encouraging an apologetic position towards the Polish role in the massacres.

Pope Benedict XVI accepted his resignation and named Janusz Stepnowski to succeed him on 11 November 2011.

Stefanek died on 17 January 2020 in Lublin at the age of 83, and he was buried in the Łomża cathedral on 23 January.
