= Święte, Aleksandrów County =

Święte
- Village
- Location within Poland
- Coordinates: 52°47′N 18°47′E
- Country: Poland
- Voivodeship: Kuyavian-Pomeranian
- County: Aleksandrów
- Gmina: Koneck
- Time zone: UTC+1 (CET)
  - Summer (DST): UTC+2 (CEST)
- Vehicle registration: CAL

Święte (Polish pronunciation: [ˈɕfjɛntɛ]) is a village in the administrative district of Gmina Koneck, within Aleksandrów County, Kuyavian-Pomeranian Voivodeship, in north-central Poland. It is located in the historic region of Kuyavia.

During the German occupation of Poland (World War II), in 1940, the occupiers carried out expulsions of Poles, whose farms were then handed over to German colonists as part of the Lebensraum policy.
