= Paweł Straszyński =

Polish Roman Catholic bishop

- Bishop of Augustów
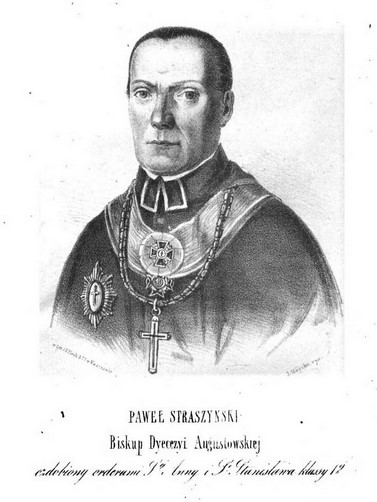
- Appointed: 21 November 1836
- Predecessor: Mikołaj Jan Manugiewicz
- Successor: Konstanty Ireneusz Łubieński

Orders
- Ordination: 21 January 1807 by Wojciech Józef Skarszewski
- Consecration: 8 January 1837 by Franciszek Pawłowski

Personal details
- Born: 26 January 1784 Krasnystaw
- Died: 21 June 1847 (aged 63) Sejny

Paweł Straszyński (26 January 1784 – 21 June 1847) was a Roman Catholic bishop of the Diocese of Augustów between 1837 and 1847.

== Biography ==
Straszyński was born in Krasnystaw. He attended the seminary there until 1805 and was ordained a priest on 25 January 1807 by Wojciech Józef Skarszewski. After his ordination, he served as a parish priest in Trzeszczany and Kumów Plebański. He was made an honorary canon of the cathedral chapter in Lublin in 1810 and was appointed a canon of the same chapter in 1822. After moving with Wojciech Skarszewski to 1823 to Warsaw, Straszyński was awarded an honorary doctorate from Jagellonian University on 15 February 1825 and was appointed canon of the cathedral chapter of Warsaw in 1826. He was later appointed vice-custodian and procurator of the cathedral chapter of Warsaw in 1829.

On 16 October 1833, Straszyński was elected vicar capitular of the Archdiocese of Warsaw. He was appointed bishop of the Diocese of Augustów on 21 November 1836; he was consecrated on 8 January 1837 in the Archcathedral Basilica of St. John the Baptist in Warsaw by Franciszek Pawłowski, co-consecrated by Mateusz Maurycy Wojakowski and Konstanty Wincenty Plejewski. He died on 21 June 1847 and was buried in the cathedral in Sejny.
