= Romuald Jałbrzykowski =

Polish Catholic priest (1876–1955)

His Excellency Romuald Jałbrzykowski
- Archbishop of Vilnius
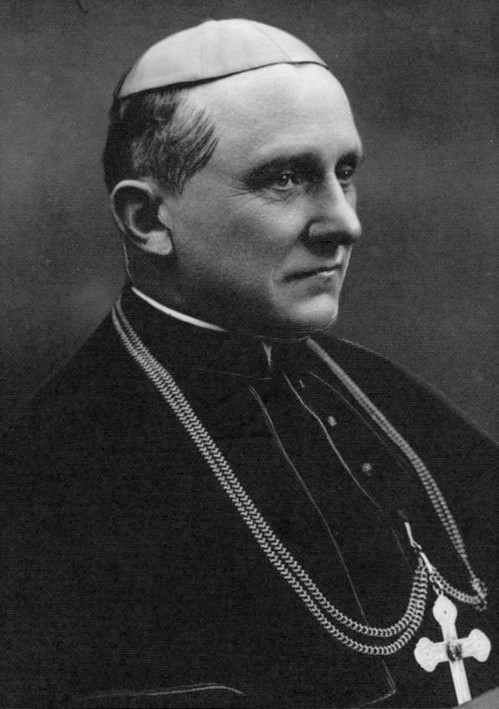
- Church: Roman Catholic
- Archdiocese: Vilnius
- Appointed: 24 June 1926
- In office: 1926–1955
- Predecessor: Jan Cieplak
- Successor: Julijonas Steponavičius
- Previous posts: Auxiliary Bishop of Sejny o Sejna o Augustów (1918–1925); Bishop of Łomża (1925–1926)

Orders
- Ordination: 9 March 1901
- Consecration: 30 November 1918 by Aleksander Kakowski
- Rank: Metropolitan Archbishop

Personal details
- Born: 7 February 1876 Łętowo-Dąb, Congress Poland, Russian Empire
- Died: 19 June 1955 (aged 79) Białystok, Poland

Romuald Jałbrzykowski (7 February 1876 – 19 June 1955) was a Polish Catholic priest.

== Life ==
Jałbrzykowski was born in Łętowo-Dąb, and he attended the seminary in Saint Petersburg. He was ordained in 1901, and he became the titular bishop of Cuse in 1918. From 1925 to 1926 he was the bishop of Łomża; from 1926 to 1955, archbishop of Wilno (Vilnius); from 1945 to 1955 he was exiled and seated in Białystok (in the Polish part of his Archdiocese) for the Soviet occupation of Lithuania.

On June 24, 1926, Jałbrzykowski was appointed the Archbishop of Vilnius and since 1930 in the Archdiocese of Vilnius he prohibited the establishment of Lithuanian parishes, banned church services in Lithuanian language, and replaced incumbent Lithuanian priests with Polish priests. Moreover, Jałbrzykowski in the Archdiocese of Vilnius also maintained a restrictive policy toward Belarusian religious movements, opposed preaching in Belarusian language, and looked unfavorably toward Belarusian priests participation in Belarusian national movements (e.g. Belarusian Christian Democracy).

While Jałbrzykowski was the Archbishop of Vilnius, Saint Faustina Kowalska was a nun at the convent there, and her confessor was Father Michael Sopocko. Jałbrzykowski gave Sopocko permission to display the Divine Mercy image for the first time ever during a Mass on 28 April 1935, the second Sunday of Easter; the feast that is now officially called Divine Mercy Sunday.

Jałbrzykowski knew Faustina, and she had been to confession with him and told him about the Divine Mercy devotion. In January 1936, Faustina went to see him again to discuss a new congregation for Divine Mercy, but he reminded her that she was perpetually vowed to her current order. In the summer of 1936, Jalbrzykowski provided his imprimatur for the first brochure on the Divine Mercy devotion, written by Sopocko.

In 1939, a year after Faustina's death, Jałbrzykowski noticed that her predictions about the war had taken place and allowed public access to the Divine Mercy image. That resulted in large crowds and led to the spread of the Divine Mercy devotion.

In october 1939, after the transfer of the Vilnius Region to Lithuania under the Soviet–Lithuanian Mutual Assistance Treaty, Jałbrzykowski was informed by the Lithuanian authorities that he must leave the county. He was detained in 1942, and from 1942 to 1944 he was imprisoned by Nazi Germany at the monastery in Marijampolė . After the war, he returned to Vilnius but was arrested by the NKVD. He was then deported to Poland in 1945, as the Soviets tried to dismantel the archdiocese of Vilnius in the Lithuanian Soviet Socialist Republic. Jałbrzykowski was attacked in the communist press in 1953, accused of being an "enemy of the people's democracy," "threatening patriotic priests with canonical punishment," and being a "servant of Vatican imperialism." He died in 1955.

== See also ==
- Reorganization of occupied dioceses during World War II
