= Diocese of Łomża =

Roman Catholic diocese in Poland

Coordinates: 53°10′40″N 22°04′49″E

Diocese of Łomża Dioecesis Lomzensis Diecezja łomżyńska

Catholic
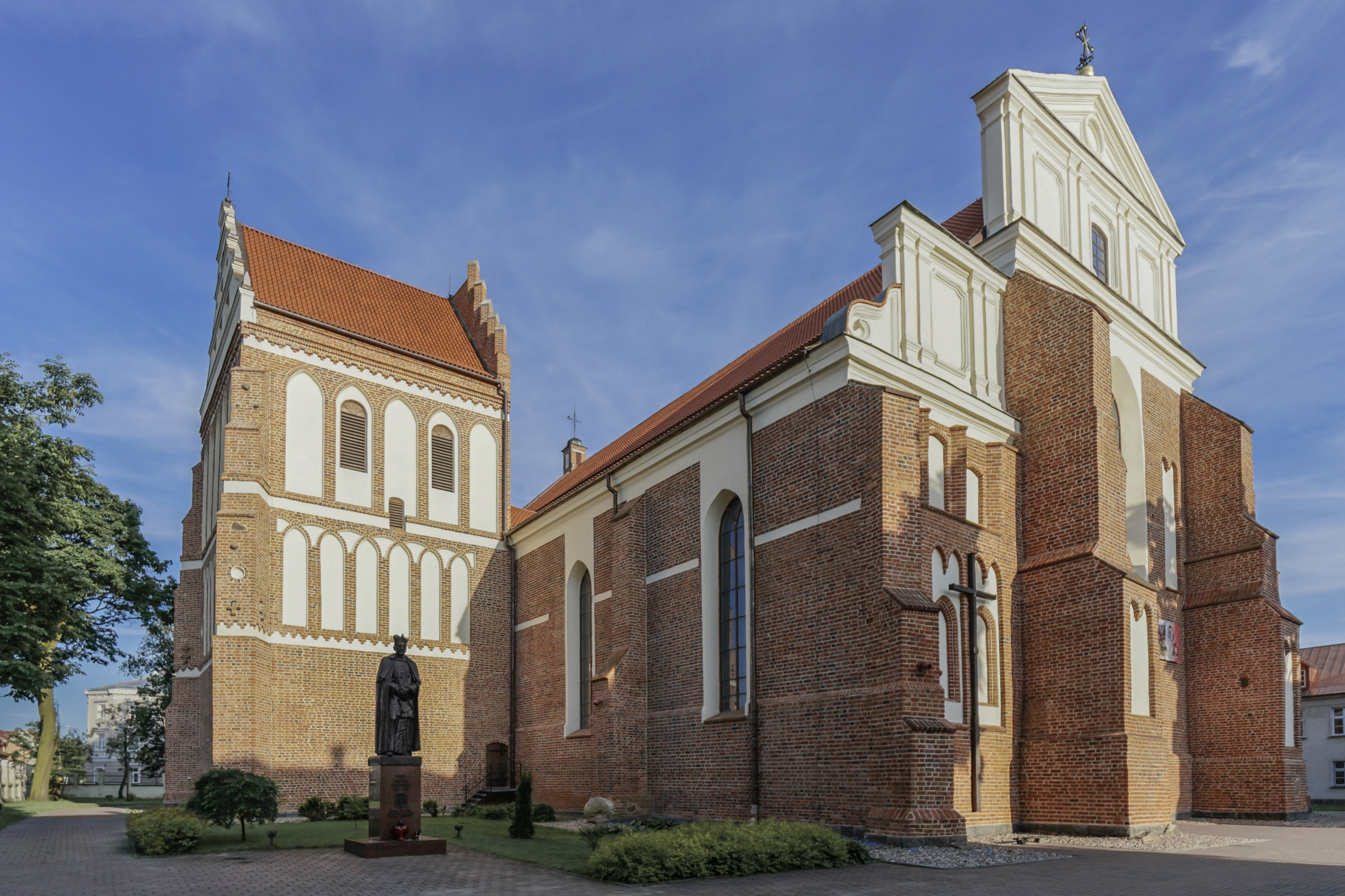
- Cathedral of St. Michael the Archangel, Łomża

Location
- Country: Poland
- Metropolitan: Białystok

Statistics
- Area: 11,500 km^{2} (4,400 sq mi)
- Population: Total; Catholics: (as of 2023); 497,773; 491,838 (98.8%)

Information
- Rite: Latin Rite
- Cathedral: Katedra pw. św. Michała Archanioła

Current leadership
- Pope: Leo XIV
- Bishop: Janusz Stepnowski
- Auxiliary Bishops: Tadeusz Bronakowski
- Vicar General: Tadeusz Bronakowski

Map
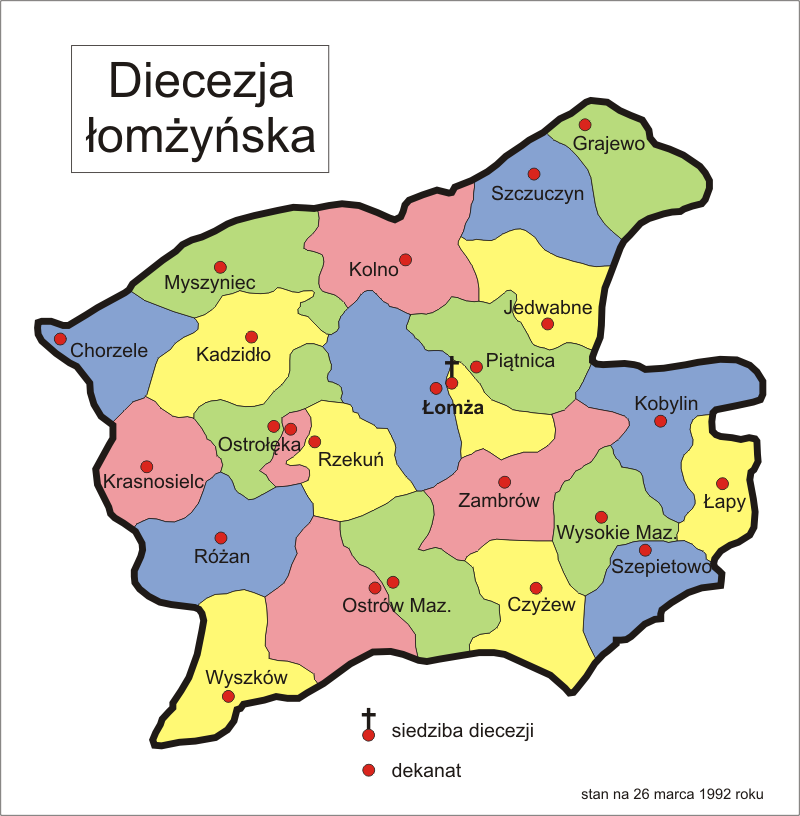
- The map of diocese

Website
- Website of the Diocese

The Diocese of Łomża (Latin: Dioecesis Lomzensis) is a Latin Church diocese of the Catholic Church located in the city of Łomża in the ecclesiastical province of Białystok in Poland.

There are currently 526 priests in the Diocese. The most recent death of a priest was that of Fr. Franciszek Wróblewski on 25 August at age 81.

== History ==
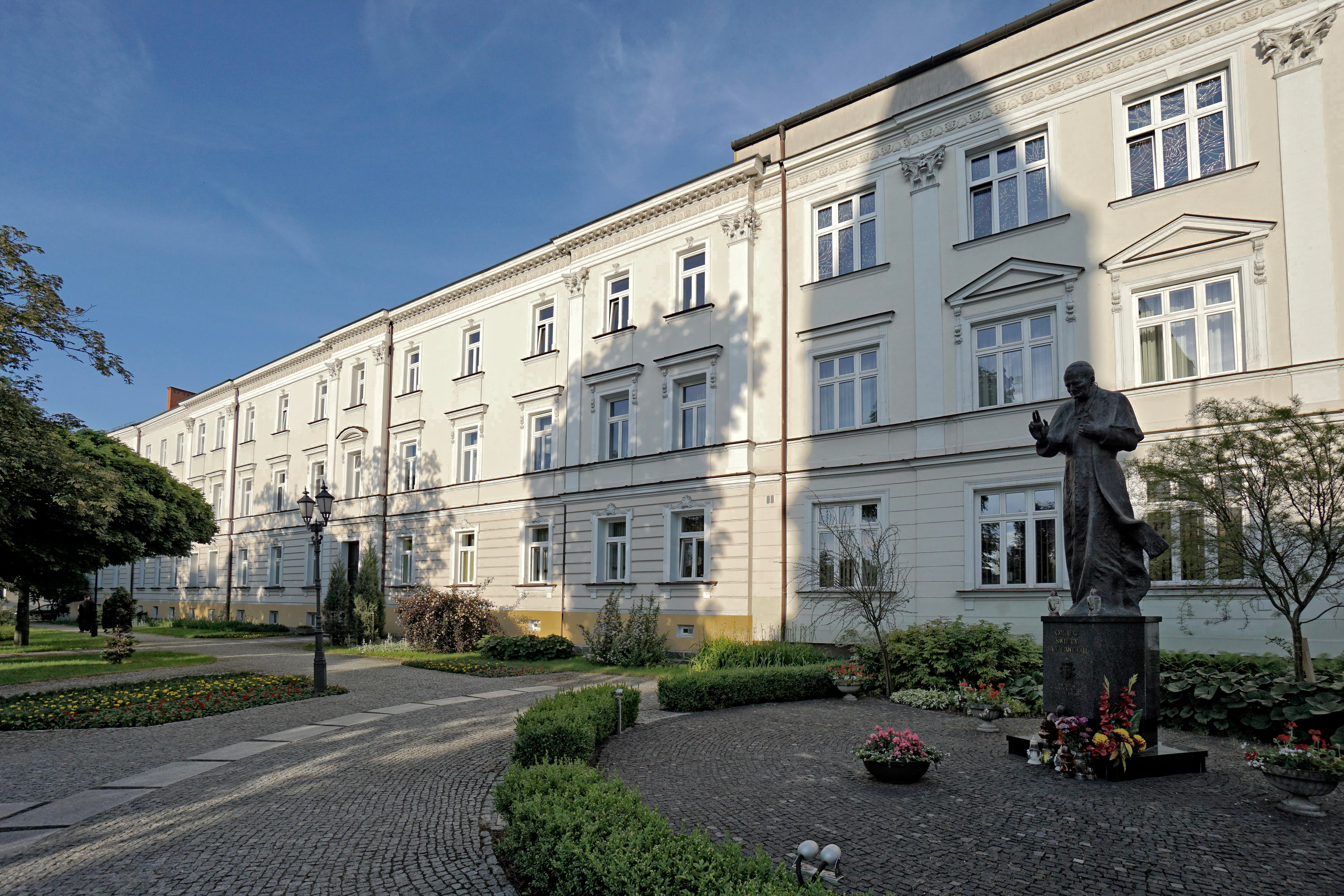
Theological seminary in Łomża

On March 25, 1798, it was established as Diocese of Sejny/Augustów, from the Diocese of Wigry. Its territory had formerly belonged to the Diocese of Vilnius, but after the first partition of Poland it fell to Prussia. Pope Pius VI carved out the new diocese and established its see at the Camaldolese monastery of Wigry, in a village about ten miles east of Suwałki. The monastery had been founded under the patronage of the King of Poland and Grand Duke of Lithuania Władysław II Jagiełło in 1418, and the Church of Our Lady, which became the cathedral, became the parish church of Wigry.

The first bishop of the diocese was the preacher Michael Francis Karpowicz (b. 1744; d. 1805). His successor was John Clement Gołaszewski (b. 1748; d. 1820), who enlarged the Wigry cathedral. After the Congress of Vienna this territory passed to the Russian Partition, and in 1818 the Church throughout the Congress Poland was reorganized. By a Bull of Pius VII Warsaw was made the metropolitan see and the see of Wigry was changed to Augustów, a town founded in 1561 by King Sigismund II Augustus. The new cathedral and chapter there were inaugurated on December 8, 1819.

The next bishop, Ignatius Czyzewski, did not remain at Augustów, but changed his place of residence in 1823 to Sejny, a town founded in 1522 by Sigismund I the Old, and which is about twenty miles east of Suwałki. The succeeding bishop, Nicholas John Manugiewicz, established the diocesan seminary in 1830, and for many years resided sometimes at Augustowo and then at Sejny. His successor was Stanislaus Choromanski, afterwards Archbishop of Warsaw. The next bishop, Straszyński, made the old Dominican church at Sejny his cathedral and entered it as bishop, 4 February 1837. He was in frequent collision with the Russian authorities, and on his death in 1847 the see was kept vacant by the Russian Government until 1863. Constantine Lubieński was then made bishop, and on his death in exile in 1869 at Nizhny Novgorod was succeeded by Bishop Wierzbowski. His successors were Antanas Baranauskas and Antoni Karaś.

On October 28, 1925, the diocese was renamed as the diocese of Łomża, then suffragan of the Archdiocese of Vilnius (until 1991).

== Leadership ==
- Bishops of Łomża (Roman rite)
  - Bishop Janusz Stepnowski (since 2011.11.11)
  - Bishop Stanisław Stefanek, S. Chr. (1996.10.26 – 2011.11.11)
  - Archbishop Juliusz Paetz (1982.12.20 – 1996.04.11)
  - Bishop Mikołaj Sasinowski (1970.03.19 – 1982.09.06)
  - Bishop Czesław Falkowski (1949.02.24 – 1969.08.25)
  - Bishop Stanisław Kostka Łukomski (1926.06.24 – 1948.10.28)
  - Archbishop Romuald Jałbrzykowski (1925.12.14 – 1926.06.24)
  - Bishop Antanas Karosas (1910.04.07 – 1926.04.05)
- Bishops of Sejny (Roman rite)
  - Bishop Antanas Baranauskas (1897.07.21 – 1902.11.26)
  - Bishop Piotr Paweł Wierzbowski (1872.02.23 – 1893.07.01)
  - Bishop Konstanty Ireneusz Łubieński (1863.12.20 - 1869.06.16)
  - Bishop Paweł Straszyński (1836.11.21 – 1847.07.21)
  - Bishop Mikołaj Jan Manugiewicz (1825.12.19 – 1834.06.25)
  - Bishop Ignacy Stanisław Czyżewski (1820.05.29 – 1823.12.11)
  - Bishop Jan Klemens Gołaszewski (1818.06.30 – 1820.03.08)

== See also ==
- List of bishops of Łomża
- Roman Catholicism in Poland
