= Ignacy Raczyński =

Polish Roman Catholic bishop

- Primate of Poland; Archbishop of Gniezno
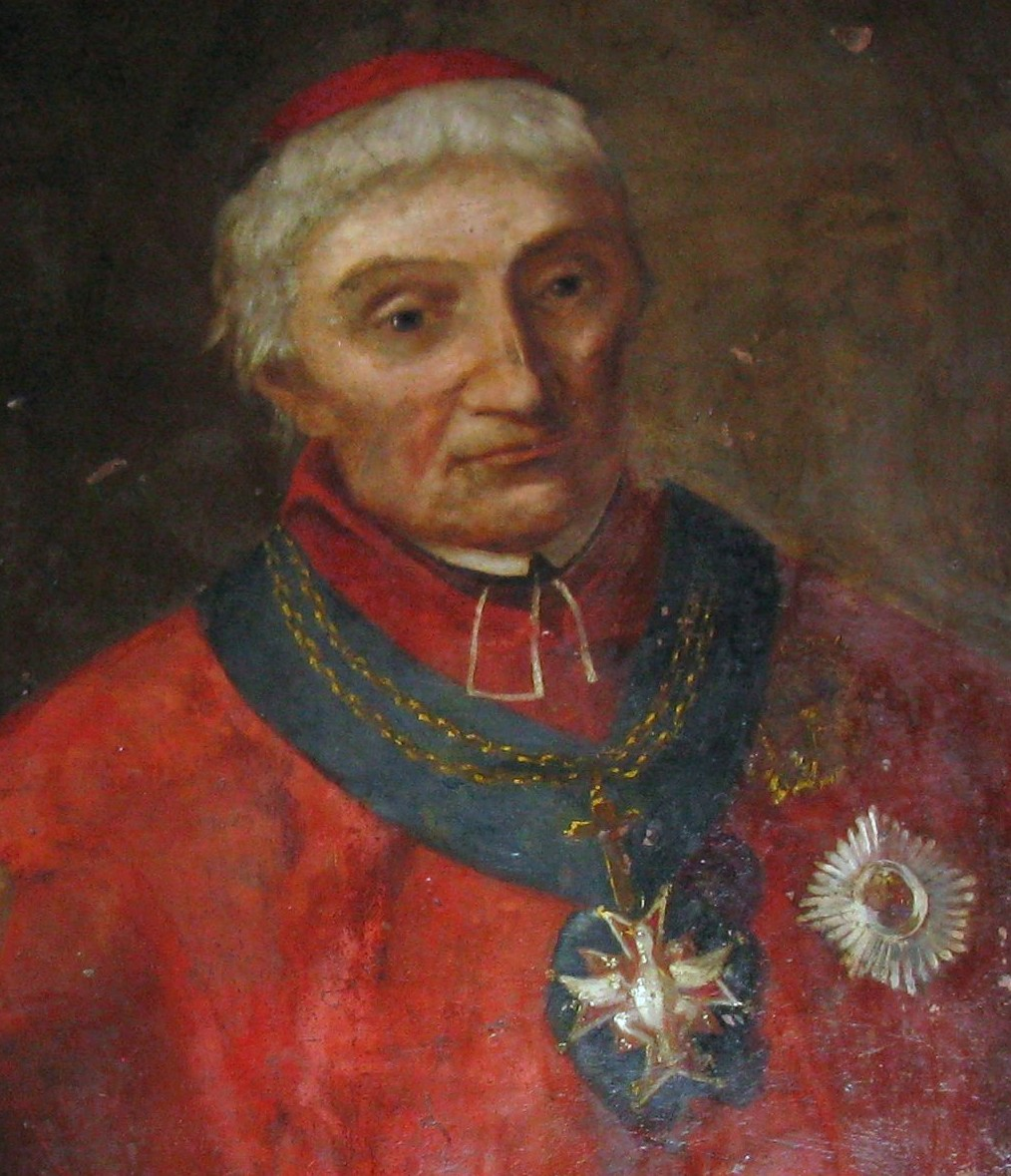
- Predecessor: Ignacy Krasicki
- Successor: Tymoteusz Paweł Gorzeński
- Previous post(s): Apostolic administrator of Warsaw (1806 – 1818); Bishop of Poznań (1794 – 1806)

Orders
- Ordination: 31 July 1770
- Consecration: 9 November 1794 by Franciszek Ksawery Rydzyński

Personal details
- Born: 6 August 1741; Małoszyna
- Died: 19 February 1823 (aged 81); Przemyśl

Ignacy Antoni Raczyński (6 August 1741 – 19 February 1823) was a primate of Poland and archbishop of Gniezno.

== Biography ==
Raczyński was born in Małoszyna to Antoni and Katarzyna Raczyński. He joined an order of the Jesuits based in Kraków on 5 August 1760; he was ordained to the subdiaconate on 26 July 1770, ordained to the diaconate on 29 July 1770, and finally was ordained a priest on 31 July 1770. He later studied at a Jesuit college in Milan; upon his return to Poland in July 1773, he was appointed priest for Brodnica. In 1776, he was appointed a canon of Poznań.

On 12 September 1794, Raczyński was appointed bishop of Poznań; he was consecrated on 9 November 1794 at Wschowa by Franciszek Ksawery Rydzyński, titular bishop of Nicopolis. Raczyński was later appointed archbishop of Gniezno through letters patent granted by Frederick William III on 3 May 1805 and was formally transferred to the Archdiocese of Gniezno on 26 August 1806. In addition, he was appointed apostolic administrator of Warsaw on 17 June 1806.

Raczyński assumed control of the Archdiocese of Gniezno on 10 December 1807. He resigned as archbishop of Gniezno in 1818 and moved to a Jesuit college in Rome, moving in 1821 to Brzozowa. He died on 19 February 1823 in Przemyśl.

Preceded by Antoni Onufry Okęcki	Bishop of Poznań; 1794–1806	Succeeded by vacant
