= Juliusz Paetz =

Polish Catholic bishop (1935–2019)

The Most Reverend Juliusz Paetz
- Archbishop Emeritus of Poznań
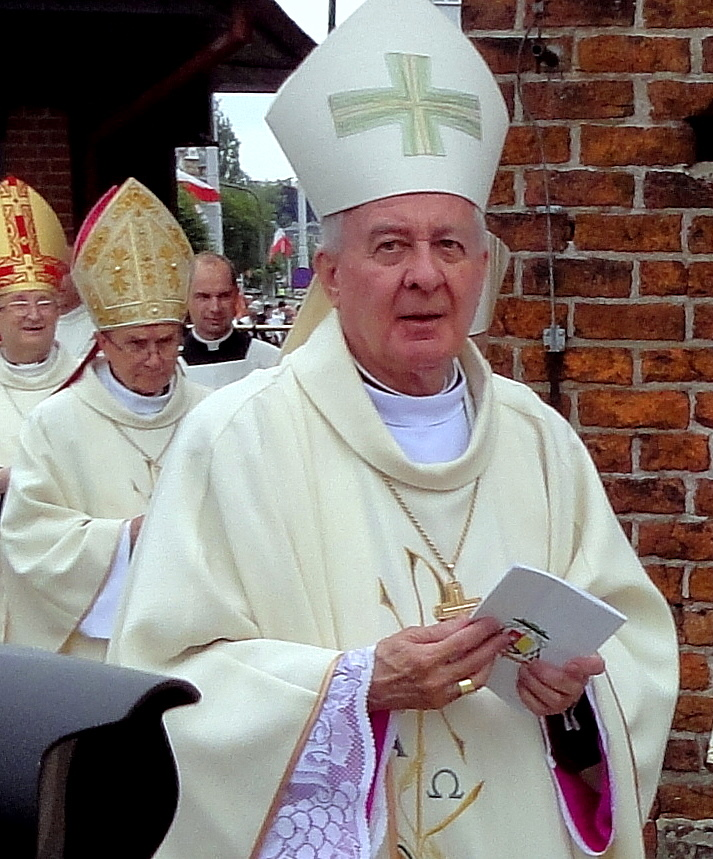
- Church: Roman Catholic Church
- Archdiocese: Archbishop of Poznań
- Province: Poznan
- Diocese: Poznan
- In office: 1996–2002
- Other post: Bishop of Łomża (1982–96)

Orders
- Ordination: 28 June 1959 by Antoni Baraniak
- Consecration: 6 January 1983 by Pope John Paul II

Personal details
- Born: Juliusz Paetz; 2 February 1935 Poznań, Wielkopolskie, Poland
- Died: 15 November 2019 (aged 84) Pleszew, Wielkopolskie, Poland
- Motto: In Nomine Domini

Juliusz Paetz (2 February 1935 – 15 November 2019) was a Polish bishop of the Catholic Church. He served as the Bishop of Łomża from 1982 to 1996 and as the Archbishop of Poznań from 1996 to 2002. In 2002, he was accused of sexually molesting seminarians and resigned the same year. Subsequently, Paetz became Archbishop Emeritus.

Despite being prohibited from exercising his ministry as a result of these accusations, he continued to do so and was never held legally accountable for the alleged sexual abuse.

== Biography ==
Paetz was born on 2 February 1935 in Poznań and ordained a priest 28 June 1959 in Poznan Cathedral by Archbishop Antoni Baraniak. He worked as a curate in the parishes of Ostrow Wielkopolski and Poznan. He lived in Italy from 1967 to 1982. He worked in the Secretariat of the Synod of Bishops. In 1976 he was appointed prelate of the Pope's anteroom. He collaborated with the Popes Paul VI, John Paul I and John Paul II. In 1981 he was awarded the Commander's Cross of the Order of Merit of Portugal.

== Bishop ==
On 20 December 1982, Paetz was appointed Bishop of Łomża. He was consecrated bishop 6 January 1983 in St. Peter's Basilica by Pope John Paul II and took possession of his diocese on 13 March 1983.

On 11 April 1996 he was appointed Archbishop of Poznań.

== Abuse accusations ==
In 2002, Paetz was accused of sexually molesting seminarians. A Polish newspaper reported that his "'homosexual inclinations' ... had been known for at least two years and he had been refused access to a seminary by its rector". It said that a Vatican inquiry had confirmed the substance of the allegations against Paetz, which he continued to deny. He said: "I deny all the information published by the media and I assure you that it is a misinterpretation of my words and behavior.... The biggest criminals have a right to anonymity unless a court decides otherwise. I was deprived of that. Mass media have already judged me and sentenced me." Pope John Paul II called it a "grave scandal". He accepted his resignation and placed sanctions on him, prohibiting Paetz from exercising his ministry as bishop. Paetz said: "Not everyone understood my open attitude to people and their problems."

It was reported in 2010 that Pope Benedict XVI lifted these restrictions, which Vatican spokesman Federico Lombardi denied saying his "rehabilitation was without foundation". Paetz remained Archbishop emeritus, having been replaced in Poznań by Stanisław Gądecki on the day he retired in 2002. He continued to participate in episcopal ordinations and was seen on Polish TV greeting Pope Benedict XVI on his visit to Poland in 2006.

In 2016, when Paetz planned to participate in a celebration in Poznań of the 1050th anniversary of Christianity in Poland, the Papal Nuncio to Poland, Archbishop Celestino Migliore, reminded him that he was not supposed to. He wrote: "Media news about your participation in official celebrations of the anniversary of Poland's baptism has created a new situation of unnecessary and harmful commotion for the church in Poland and the Holy See. It blatantly contradicts the instructions given you." Paetz commented: "Why not? I am on home ground here."
