= Mikołaj Jan Manugiewicz =

Polish Roman Catholic bishop

- Bishop of Augustów
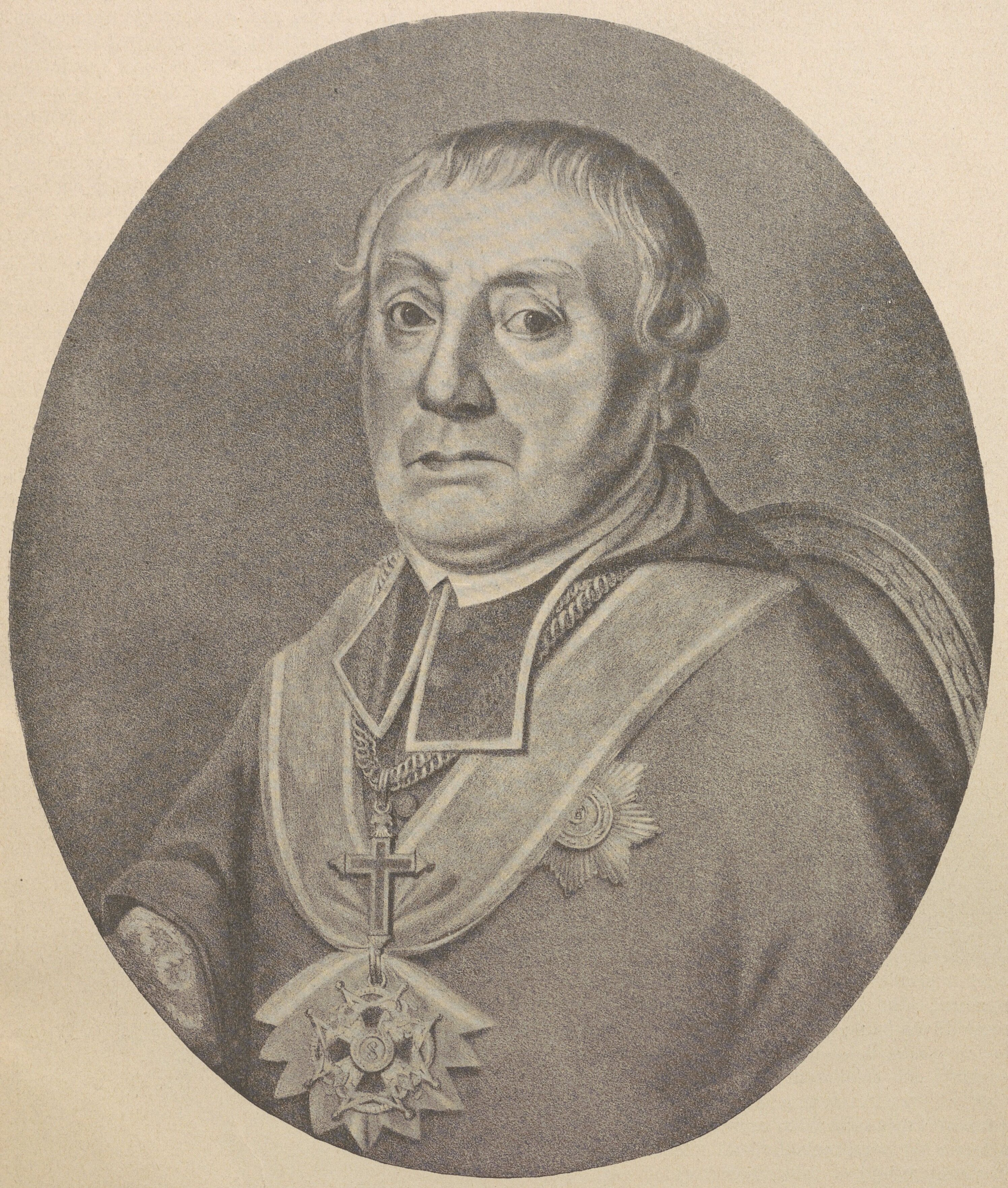
- Mikolaj Manugiewicz
- Predecessor: Ignacy Stanisław Czyżewski
- Successor: Paweł Straszyński
- Previous posts: Auxiliary bishop of Warsaw (1821 – 1826); Titular bishop of Thaumacus (1821 – 1826)

Orders
- Consecration: 10 November 1822 by Szczepan Hołowczyc

Personal details
- Born: 1754
- Died: 25 June 1834 (aged 79–80) Warsaw

Mikołaj Jan Manugiewicz (1754 – 25 June 1834) was a Polish Roman Catholic bishop of the Diocese of Augustów.

== Biography ==
Manugiewicz was born in Rykhtychi in 1754. He was first taught by Jesuits in Zolochiv and Zamość, later going to Rome to study theology. He completed his studies in Rome after some years and, during his time there, was ordained a priest. He was appointed priest for Kaski in 1785.

Manugiewicz was later granted an honoris causa doctorate of theology from Vilnius and was made vicar capitular of Warsaw. Afterwards, he was appointed canon of Gniezno and Łowicz. On 2 December 1821, he was appointed as auxiliary bishop of Warsaw and titular bishop of Thaumacus, becoming the Archdiocese's first auxiliary bishop. He was consecrated on 10 November 1822 by Szczepan Hołowczyc and was co-consecrated by Jan Paweł Woronicz and Józef Koźmian. Manugiewicz was later appointed bishop of Augustów in late 1825 and assumed control of the diocese on 9 July 1826.

Manugiewicz was appointed a Senator of Congress Poland on 16 May 1827. He died on 25 June 1834 in Warsaw.
