= Basilica of the Presentation of Mary =

- Minor Basilica of the Presentation of the Blessed Virgin Mary
- Bazylika Ofiarowania Najświętszej Maryi Panny
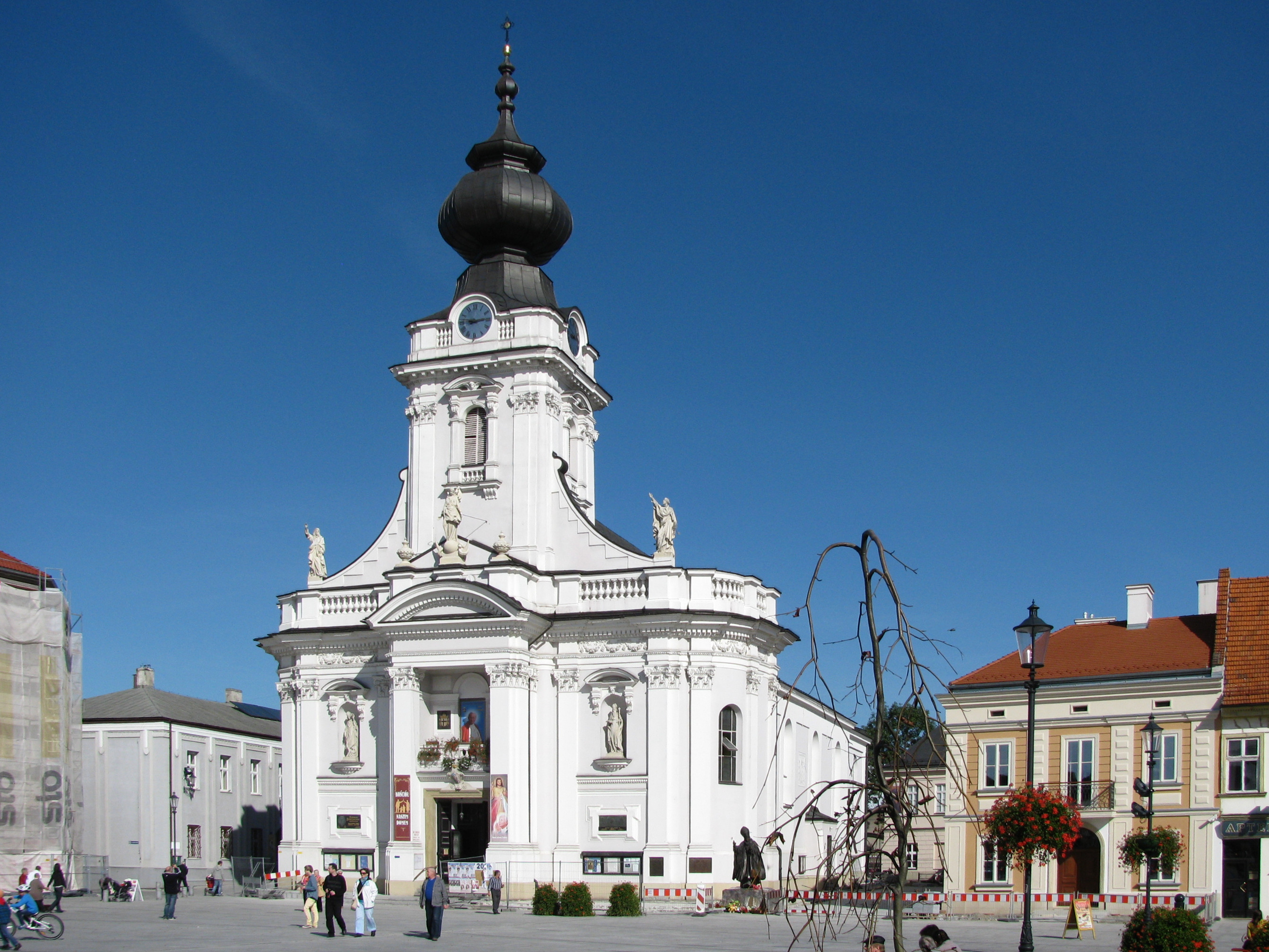
- Main façade
- Basilica of the Presentation of Mary
- 49.883611°N 19.493611°E
- Country: Poland
- Denomination: Catolicism
- Churchmanship: High church
- Website: www.wadowicejp2.pl/en/

History
- Dedication: Virgin Mary

Architecture
- Functional status: Active
- Style: Baroque

Administration
- Archdiocese: Archdiocese of Kraków

Clergy
- Archbishop: Grzegorz Ryś

The Minor Basilica of the Presentation of the Blessed Virgin Mary (Polish: Bazylika Ofiarowania Najświętszej Maryi Panny) or, simply, the Basilica of the Presentation of Mary is a Catholic minor basilica at the city of Wadowice, Lesser Poland. The temple was built around the 18th century, consolidating in the 19th century in a Baroque style. The parish church was elevated to a minor basilica by the now Saint Pope John Paul II, a citizen of Wadowice, on March 25, 1992.
