= Władysław Ziółek =

Polish Roman Catholic archbishop (born 1935)

Most Reverend Władysław Ziółek
- Archbishop Emeritus of Łódź
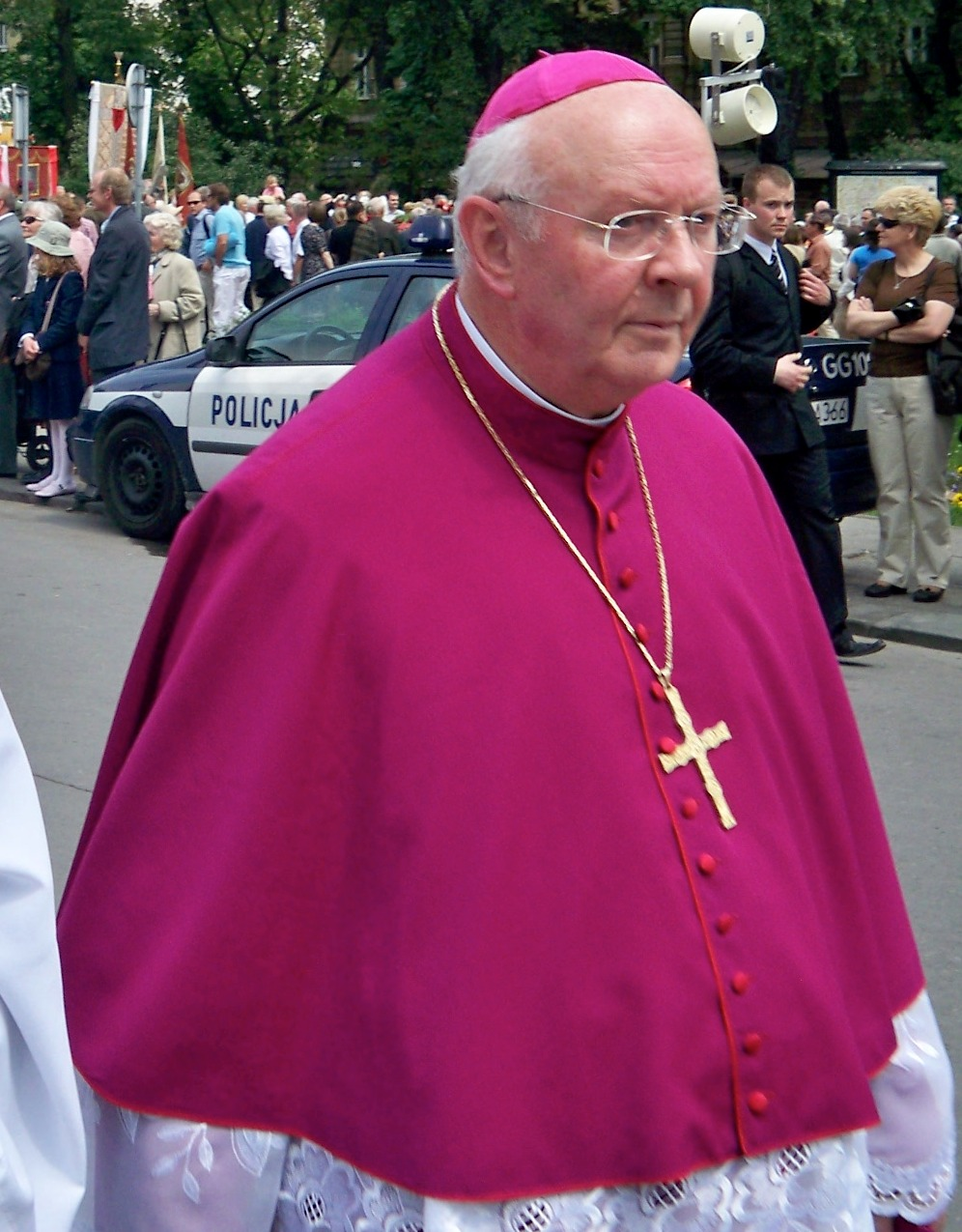
- Ziółek in 2009
- Province: Łódź
- Diocese: Łódź
- Installed: 24 January 1986
- Term ended: 11 July 2012
- Predecessor: Józef Rozwadowski
- Successor: Marek Jędraszewski

Orders
- Ordination: 13 July 1958 by Józef Gawlina
- Consecration: 4 May 1980 by Józef Rozwadowski

Personal details
- Born: Władysław Ziółek; 22 June 1935 (age 91) Komorniki, Second Polish Republic
- Education: Major Theological Seminary in Łódź, Pontifical Gregorian University
- Motto: In virtute Spiritus

Władysław Ziółek (born 22 June 1935) is a Polish Roman Catholic prelate, who served as the first Archbishop of Łódź from 1986 until his retirement in 2012. He is currently Archbishop Emeritus of Łódź.

== Early life and education ==
Władysław Ziółek was born in Komorniki, Poland, on 22 June 1935. He studied theology and philosophy at the Major Theological Seminary in Łódź. He continued his studies in Rome at the Pontifical Gregorian University. There he was ordained a priest on 13 July 1958 by Archbishop Józef Gawlina. He obtained a doctorate in canon law from the Gregorian and then completed a three-year internship at the Apostolic Signatura and the Roman Rota, preparing for work within the ecclesiastical judiciary.

== Episcopal ministry ==
=== Auxiliary Bishop of Łódź ===
On 12 March 1980, Pope John Paul II appointed Ziółek as the Auxiliary Bishop of Łódź and Titular Bishop of Risinium. He received his episcopal consecration on 4 May 1980 from Bishop Józef Rozwadowski.

=== Bishop and Archbishop of Łódź ===
Upon the retirement of Bishop Rozwadowski, Ziółek was appointed Bishop of Łódź on 24 January 1986. In 1992 he became an archbishop when the Diocese of Łódź was elevated to the rank of an Archdiocese. On 24 February 2004, the diocese was elevated to a metropolitan see, and Ziółek became its first Metropolitan Archbishop.

=== Retirement ===
Pope Benedict XVI accepted his retirement on 11 July 2012, after Ziółek reached the age limit of 75. He was succeeded by Marek Jędraszewski.

== Honors ==
- Honorary Citizen of the City of Łódź (2003).
- Grand Cross of the Order of Polonia Restituta.
