= Saint Anne's Church, Poznań =

St. Anne Parish in Poznań
- Parafia Rzymskokatolicka pw. św. Anny
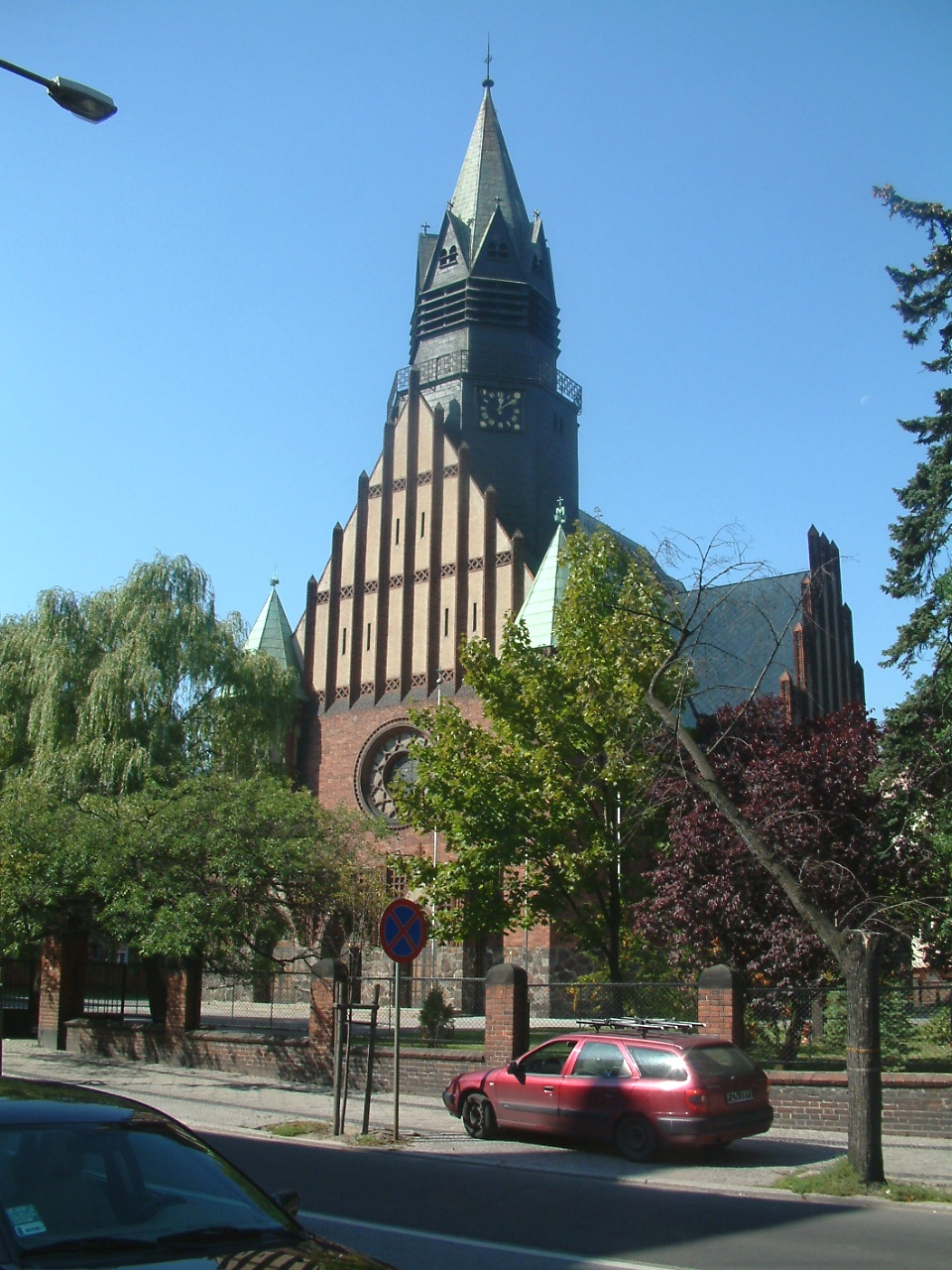
- St. Anne Parish in Poznań
- 52°23′49″N 16°53′54″E
- Location: Poznań
- Country: Poland
- Denomination: Roman Catholic Church
- Website: http://www.swanna.tami.pl/

History
- Dedication: Saint Anne
- Dedicated: 1948

Architecture
- Completed: 1907

Clergy
- Priest: Marek Balcer

The Parish of St. Anne in Poznań, erected in 1948, is a Roman Catholic parish belonging to the Poznań-Lazarus deanery in the Archdiocese of Poznań in Poznań, Poland. It is located on 13 Limanowskiego Street in Poznań's St. Lazarus.

== History ==
Before World War II, evangelical Germans in Poznań lacked facilities for worship, despite being a significant portion of the population (about 30 percent). Meanwhile, Catholic residents in the Poznań Lazarus district worshipped at the Parish of Our Lady of Sorrows. To address the need of the Protestant community, a church dedicated to Christ (Christuskirche) was constructed between 1904 and 1907. This church served the German population well until after World War II, when a large numbers of the German community left the city.

In 1945 the church was designated for Catholic services. Pastoral ministry was performed by priests from the nearby parish church, St. Michael the Archangel. On April 1, 1948, Archbishop Walenty Dymek issued a decree creating a new St. Anne Parish. The first pastor was Rev. Tadeusz Nowakowski, former administrator of the Parish of St. Michael.

The church underwent its first renovation after an initiative to change the interior to match the Catholic liturgy requirements. In 1956, a team led by Prof. Wacław Taranczewski commissioned murals to be completed in the sanctuary. In subsequent years, a rectory and a parish house were also added. In 1988, the state authorities formally transferred the buildings and land to the ownership of the parish.

== Present day ==
Currently, the Parish includes the territory from the northern part of Lazarus (north from Sczanieckiej Street and Rynek Łazarski Market Square). The priest in charge (since 2010) is Rev. Fr. Marek Balcer. Parish work includes The Parish Caritas Team Living Rosary, The Senior Club, The Knights of the Immaculata, and Home Church.
