= Grzegorz Balcerek =

21st-century Polish Catholic bishop

His Excellency, The Most Reverend Grzegorz Balcerek
- Auxiliary Bishop of Poznań; Titular Bishop of Selendeta
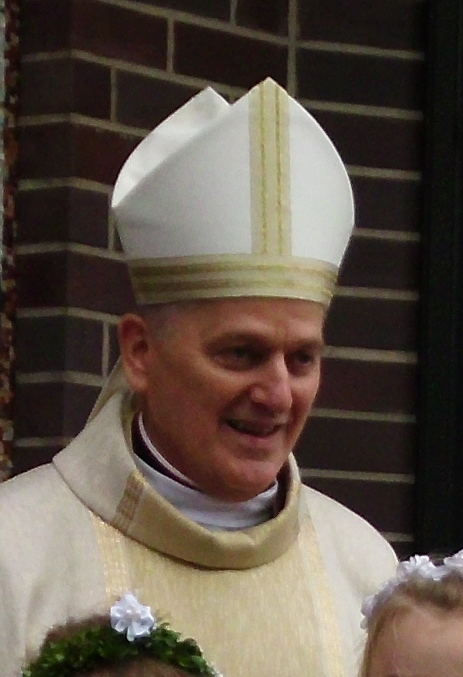
- Balcerek in 2014
- Church: Roman Catholic Church
- Archdiocese: Poznań
- In office: 1999 –

Orders
- Ordination: 24 May 1979 by Jerzy Stroba
- Consecration: 13 May 1999 by Juliusz Paetz
- Rank: Bishop

Personal details
- Born: 13 February 1954 (age 72) Grodzisk Wielkopolski, Poland
- Motto: In Spirutu Humilitatis
- Coat of arms

Grzegorz Balcerek (born 13 February 1954) is a Polish Roman Catholic bishop, being the auxiliary bishop of the Roman Catholic Archdiocese of Poznań and titular bishop of Selendeta since 1999.

== Biography ==
=== Early life ===
Balcerek was born in Grodzisk Wielkopolski, although he spent his childhood in Woźniki. In 1973 he graduated from the high school in Poznań, and from 1973 to 1978 Balcerek studied philosophy and theology at the Archbishop's Seminary in Poznań and later at the Pontifical Faculty of Theology in Poznań. He was ordained to priesthood on 24 May 1979 by Jerzy Stroba, then Archbishop of Poznań. In 1982 he obtained his bachelor's degree in theology from the Pontifical Faculty of Theology in Poznań. There from 1982 to 1983, he completed doctoral studies. Balcerek defended his doctoral dissertation in 1993.

=== Priestly ministry ===
After being ordained a priest, Balcerek served as the vicar of several newly created parishes in the Poznań archdiocese. From 1979 to 1983 Balcerek was the pastor at Our Lady Help of Christians in Swarzędz, and then from 1983 to 1986 he was the pastor of the Church of God's Mercy in Poznań. In 1986 he was ordered to build a church and organize a parish on the estate. Bolesław the Brave in Poznań and the following year he was appointed rector of the newly created pastoral center there: Blessed Virgin Mary, Mother of the Redeemer. In the years 1989–1999 he was the priest of the parish of St. Stanisław, Kostka. At that time, he was involved in charity, including founding a tuition-free kindergarten and a common room for children and youth adults from the so-called difficult families. As a lecturer at the Pontifical Faculty of Theology, he lectured on sociology of religion and Catholic social sciences. In 1992 he became the canon law doctor for the archdiocese of Poznań. In 1998 he was appointed episcopal vicar for the sick and healthcare.

=== Ordination as bishop ===
On 24 April 1999, Pope John Paul II appointed Balcerek as the auxiliary bishop of the archdiocese of Poznań. The same day Balcerek was appointed Titular bishop of Selendeta. He received the episcopal consecration at the hands of Archbishop Juliusz Paetz at the Archcathedral Basilica of St. Peter and St. Paul, Poznań on 13 May 1999. The Titular Bishop of Tamagrista, Zdzisław Fortuniak, and the Bishop of Kalisz, Stanisław Napierała, served as the co-consecratos.

=== As bishop ===
Since the letter Summorum Pontificum by Pope Benedict XVI in 2007, which again permitted the use of the Latin Tridentine Mass following its displacement in 1969, Balcerek has actively celebrated the Tridentine Mass and asked other bishops in Poland to follow suit. Balcerek has also hosted the traditionalist Priestly Fraternity of Saint Peter on multiple occasions.

In a 2019 homily at Poznań Cathedral, Balcerek suggested that the secularization of Europe was divine punishment for the sexual abuse crisis in the Catholic Church.
