= Robert Chrząszcz =

Polish Roman Catholic prelate

The Most Reverend Robert Chrząszcz
- Auxiliary Bishop of Kraków; Titular Bishop of Forconium
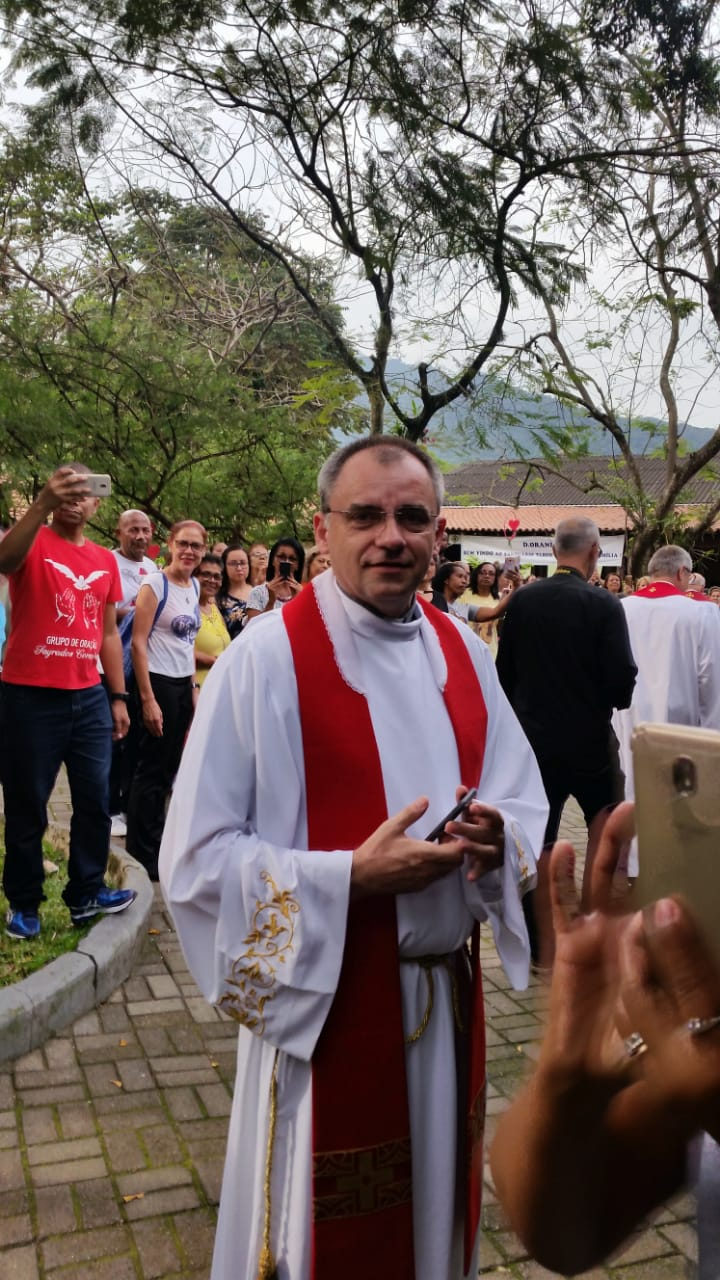
- Church: Catholic Church
- Archdiocese: Kraków
- Appointed: 11 November 2020
- Previous posts: Episcopal vicar of Jacarepaguá, Parish priest of Santa Luzia (Rio de Janeiro) and Parish priest of São Pedro do Mar (Rio de Janeiro)

Orders
- Ordination: 14 May 1994 by Franciszek Macharski
- Consecration: 6 February 2021 by Marek Jędraszewski

Personal details
- Born: Robert Józef Chrząszcz; 7 October 1969 (age 57) Wadowice, Wadowice County, Poland
- Education: Pontifical Academy of Theology in Kraków
- Motto: "Christo portas aperite"
- Coat of arms

Styles of Robert Józef Chrząszcz
- Reference style: His Excellency; The Most Reverend
- Spoken style: Your Excellency
- Religious style: Bishop

Robert Józef Chrząszcz is a Polish Roman Catholic prelate, Auxiliary Bishop of Kraków.

== Vocation ==
A native from Wadowice (birthplace of Pope John Paul II), he entered the Higher Theological Seminary of the Archdiocese of Krakow in 1988, and was ordained a deacon in 1993. After his priestly ordination, held at the Wawel Cathedral in 1994, he began his work as a parish priest. His missionary work in Brazil began in 2005, as a fidei donum priest in Rio de Janeiro. His tenure at the head of Santa Luzia Parish (2006-2019) was marked by the construction of its new church, a large temple dedicated in 2011. In 2019, he was chosen to succeed his fellow countryman, Zdzisław Stanisław Błaszczyk, as the head of São Pedro do Mar Parish, following the later's appointment as Auxiliary Bishop of Rio de Janeiro. Besides his function as a parish priest, he acted also as Episcopal vicar of Jacarepaguá vicariate and coordinator of the archdiocesan Commission for Altar Servers and Acolytes.

== Bishop ==
On 11 October 2020, Father Józef Chrząszcz was appointed Titular Bishop of Forconium and Auxiliary Bishop of Kraków. The same day, the National Conference of Bishops of Brazil issued a statement of welcome to the new bishop, praising his missionary work in Rio de Janeiro.
