= Helena Kmieć =

Polish missionary (1991–2017)

Servant of God Helena Kmieć
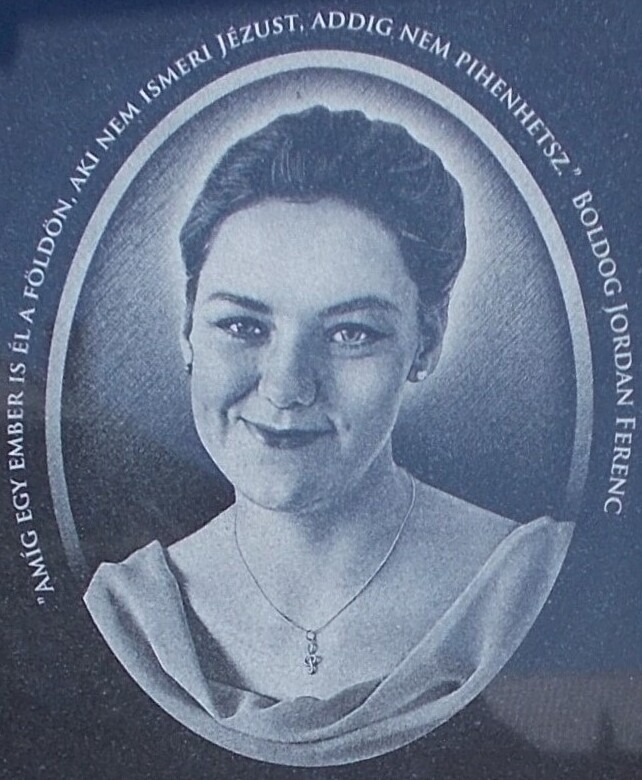
- Kmieć's plaque in Galgahévíz, with the Hungarian inscription "As long as there is one person on earth who does not know Jesus, you cannot rest"
- Born: 9 February 1991; Kraków, Poland
- Died: 24 January 2017 (aged 25); Cochabamba, Bolivia
- Cause of death: Homicide

Helena Agnieszka Kmieć (9 February 1991 – 24 January 2017) was a Polish Catholic missionary who was awarded the Polish Gold Cross of Merit. In May 2024, her sainthood cause was opened and she was named a Servant of God.

== Biography ==
Helena Agnieszka Kmieć was born on 9 February 1991 in Kraków. She was baptized on 14 April 1991 at St. Barbara's Church in Libiąż. She was related to Bishop Jan Zając, who was the brother of her grandfather. Helena's parents, father Jan from Libiąż and mother Agnieszka from Kraków, met while building a church in Olcza, Zakopane. Agnieszka died when Helena was six weeks old. She and her older sister were raised by their stepmother, Barbara.

She graduated from the High School of the Catholic Association of Educators in Libiąż. She was a scholarship holder of the Leweston School in Sherborne, UK, where she obtained her high school diploma, at the same time pursuing an individual course of study in her high school, from which she graduated in 2009. In 2014, she obtained a master's degree in engineering at the Faculty of Chemistry of the Silesian University of Technology, where she studied technology and chemical engineering in English. After graduating, she worked as a flight attendant for an airline.

She was active in the academic chaplaincy in Gliwice and sang in the Academic Choir of the Silesian University of Technology. Since 2012, she was a volunteer as part of the Missionary Volunteer Service "Salvator" in Trzebinia. She organized day camps for children at the parishes of the Salvatorian Fathers in Galgahévíz, Hungary and in Timișoara, Romania. On Friday, 6 July 2012, as part of evangelization at the railway station in Wrocław, she sang Listen, Israel, the Lord is your God, the Lord is the only one. In 2013, during the mission in Zambia, she worked with children and young people at the Salvation Home center in Lusaka and at the Kulanga Bana Farm youth center in Chamulimba, a village in Chongwe District. During the 2016 World Youth Day in Poland, she was their coordinator in the parish of St. Barbara in her hometown of Libiąż.

On 8 January 2017, together with Anita Szuwald, she went on a mission to Bolivia, where she planned to help the Servant Sisters of Dębica in an orphanage in Cochabamba until June. She died on the night of 24–25 January 2017, stabbed during an assault on the facility. In March 2018, a Bolivian court sentenced her killer, Romualdo Mamio dos Santos, to 30 years in prison.

By the decision of the President of Poland of 7 February 2017, she was posthumously awarded the Gold Cross of Merit for her charitable and social activities and her commitment to people in need of help.

Her funeral ceremonies began on 18 February 2017 at the Shrine of Our Lady of Fatima in Trzebinia, and on 19 February they continued in her hometown of Libiąż. The Holy Mass preceding the funeral was presided over by Cardinal Stanisław Dziwisz. The funeral ceremony was of a state character. Helena Kmieć was buried in the cemetery at the parish church of St. Barbara in Libiąż.

== Beatification process ==
In December 2022, the Archdiocese of Kraków announced the start of the beatification process for Helena Kmieć, and in April 2024, an edict was issued announcing the official start of the process of beatification of the Polish missionary. The process began on 10 May 2024 in the Chapel of the Palace of the Archbishops of Kraków and she was subsequently titled a Servant of God.

== Commemoration ==
In May 2017, the Society of the Divine Savior established the Helena Kmieć Foundation to promote help children and youth in mission countries.

On 18 August 2017, during a ceremonial session of the Libiąż City Council, a unanimous decision was made to posthumously grant Helena Kmieć the title of Honorary Citizen of the City of Libiąż. A motion to rename Kościelna Street to Helena Kmieć Street was also unanimously approved.

In January 2020, she became patron of the Catholic Primary School in Warsaw.
