= Cathedral of St. Nicholas the Bishop in Kalisz =

Cathedral in Kalisz, Poland

Coordinates: 51.7641°N 18.0892°E

- Katedra św. Mikołaja Biskupa w Kaliszu
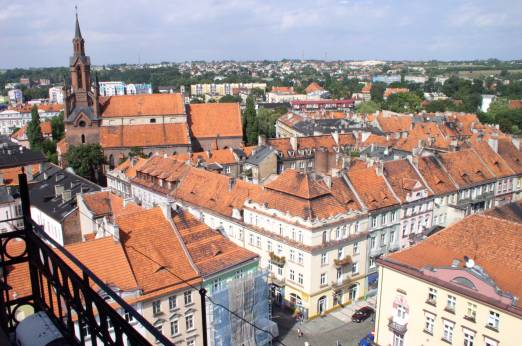
- Cathedral of St. Nicholas the Bishop in Kalisz
- Location: Kalisz
- Country: Poland
- Denomination: Catholic

History
- Founded: 13th century

Architecture
- Heritage designation: Register of monuments
- Style: Gothic

The Cathedral of St. Nicholas the Bishop in Kalisz (Polish: Katedra św. Mikołaja Biskupa w Kaliszu) is a Catholic cathedral in Kalisz, Poland. The church site dates to the 13th century, and the current church is on the register of monuments in Poland.

The church is notable for its version of a work by Peter Paul Rubens.

== History ==
The church was founded by Duke Bolesław the Pious in the late 13th century. Architect Albin Fontana performed surveying work on the church in 1612, and the church was gothicized in the 19th century.

The church became in 1818 the Cathedral of the Diocese of Cuiavia-Kalisz (now Diocese of Włocławek). It is now the Cathedral of the Diocese of Kalisz established in 1992.

== The Kalisz Rubens ==
In about 1620, art patron and nobleman Piotr Żeromski purchased a version of Deposition by Peter Paul Rubens for the church in Kalisz, which was then still only a parish church.

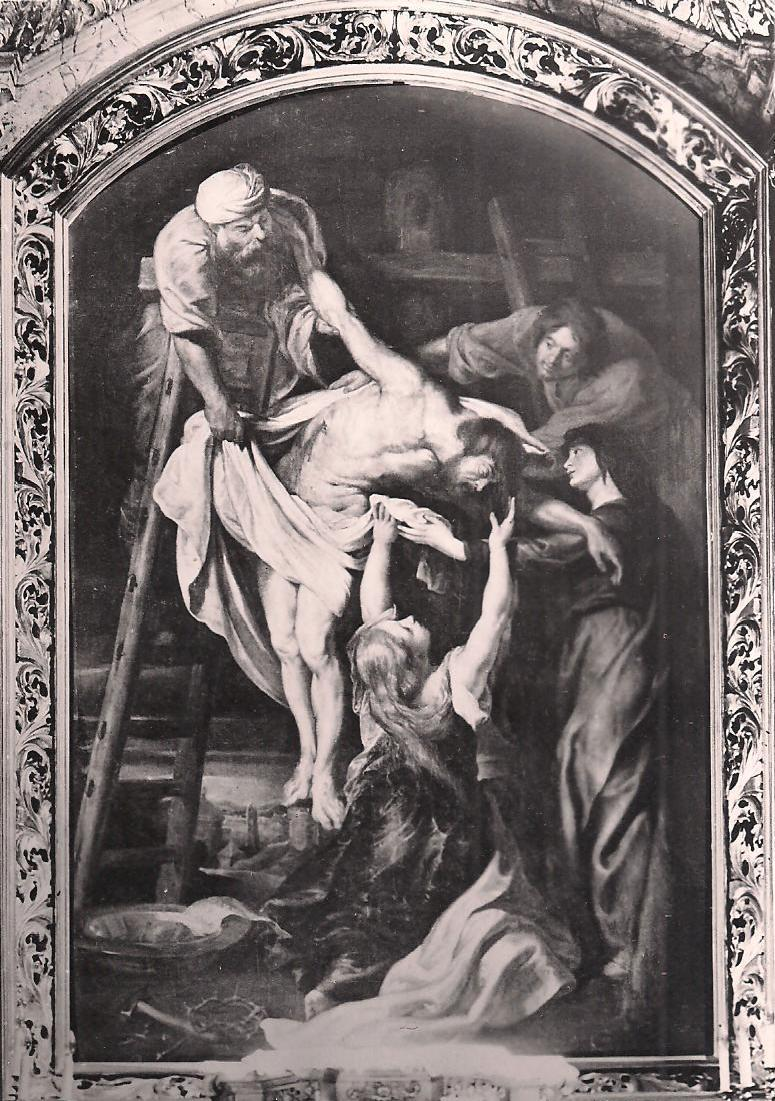
The Kalisz Rubens

In 1908, during the era of partitions, Professor Mycielski of Krakow visited Kalisz and confirmed that the painting was an authentic Rubens. It had been hanging over the altar. According to The New York Times, the inspection revealed that the canvas had five holes, and that the painting had been renovated several times by "incompetent hands." At the time, the most recent renovation had occurred 40 years prior.

Professor Mycielski recommended that the painting be conserved, and by August 1908 the money had been raised.

In December 1973, The New York Times reported that officials suspected the Rubens to have been destroyed in a fire at the church. However, Polish newspapers later reported that officials suspected the painting to have been stolen.

The cathedral currently houses a copy of the original work.

== Architecture ==
The spire features flying buttresses.
