= Selendeta =

Africa Proconsularis (125 AD)

Selendeta was an ancient civitas of the Roman Province of Byzacena during the Roman Empire and late antiquity. The exact location of the town is unknown but it was somewhere in southern Tunisia.

The town was also the seat of an ancient bishopric which survives today as a titular bishopric of the Roman Catholic Church. The current bishop is Grzegorz Balcerek.

The only known bishop of this diocese is the Donatist Vittorio who participated in the Carthage conference of 411. Today Selendeta survives as a titular bishop's seat; the current titular bishop is Grzegorz Balcerek, auxiliary bishop of Poznań.
