= Santi Cirillo e Metodio =

- Church of Saints Cyril and Methodius
- Chiesa dei Santi Cirillo e Metodio
- Location within Lazio
- 41°47′20″N 12°20′42″E
- Location: Via Osteria di Dragoncello 12, Acilia Nord, Rome
- Country: Italy
- Language(s): Italian and Latin
- Denomination: Catholic
- Tradition: Roman Rite

History
- Status: titular church, parish church
- Dedication: Cyril and Methodius
- Consecrated: 8 November 1997

Architecture
- Functional status: active
- Architect: Bruno Bozzini
- Architectural type: Modern
- Years built: 1994–97

Administration
- Diocese: Rome

Santi Cirillo e Metodio is a 20th-century parochial church and titular church near to Ostia, Rome dedicated to Cyril and Methodius.

== History ==
The church was built in 1996–97. It is of reinforced concrete with a travertine facade. Pope John Paul II visited in 1998. In 2019 the pyx was stolen from the church, but recovered.

On 30 September 2023, Pope Francis made it a titular church to be held by a cardinal-priest.

Cardinal-protectors

- Grzegorz Ryś (2023–present)
