= Teofil Wilski =

Polish Roman Catholic prelate (1935–2022)

The Most Reverend Teofil Wilski
- Auxiliary Bishop Emeritus of Kalisz
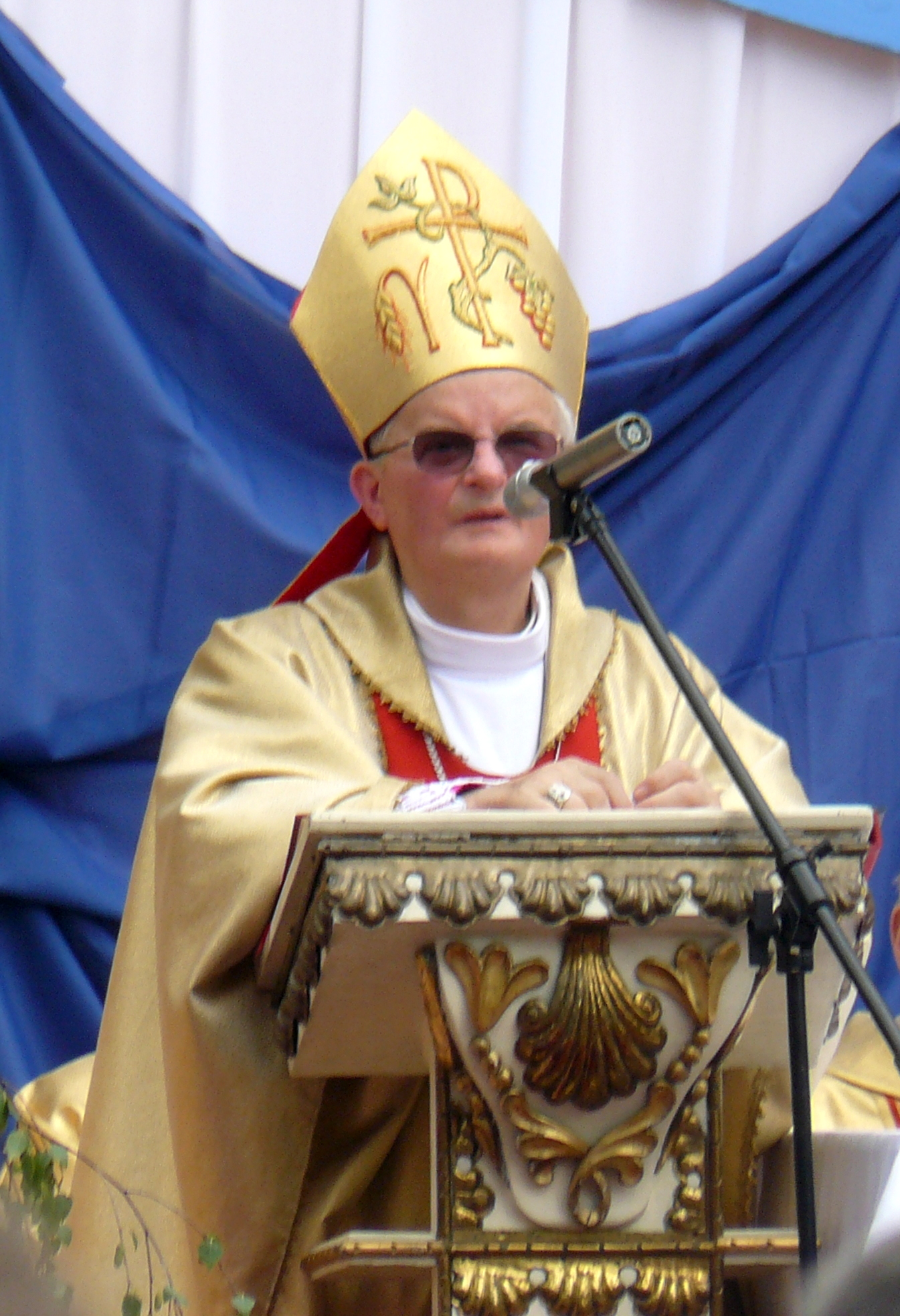
- Diocese: Kalisz
- Appointed: 8 April 1995
- Term ended: 31 October 2011
- Other post: Titular Bishop of Castellum in Mauretania (1995–2022)

Orders
- Ordination: 11 June 1960 by Stefan Wyszyński
- Consecration: 8 May 1995 by Jerzy Stroba

Personal details
- Born: Teofil Józef Wilski; 16 October 1935 Skubarczewo, Poznań Voivodeship, Poland
- Died: 26 March 2022 (aged 86) Ostrów Wielkopolski, Poland
- Motto: PATERNITATE SERVIRE DEI
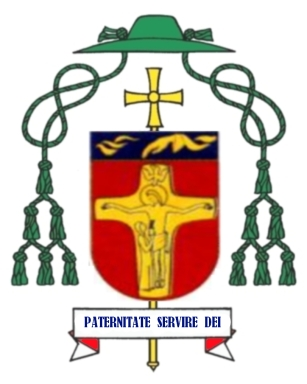
- Coat of arms

Styles of Teofil Wilski
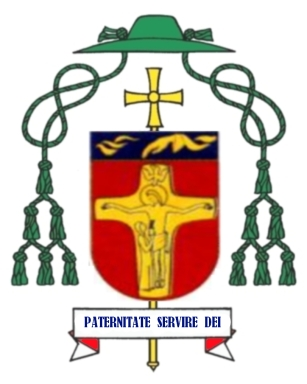
- Reference style: His Excellency; The Most Reverend
- Spoken style: Your Excellency
- Religious style: Auxiliary bishop

Teofil Józef Wilski (16 October 1935 – 26 March 2022) was a Polish Roman Catholic prelate. He was titular bishop of Castellum in Mauretania and auxiliary bishop of Kalisz from 1995 to 2011.
