= Jan Zając =

Polish Roman Catholic prelate

- Auxiliary Bishop Emeritus of Krakow
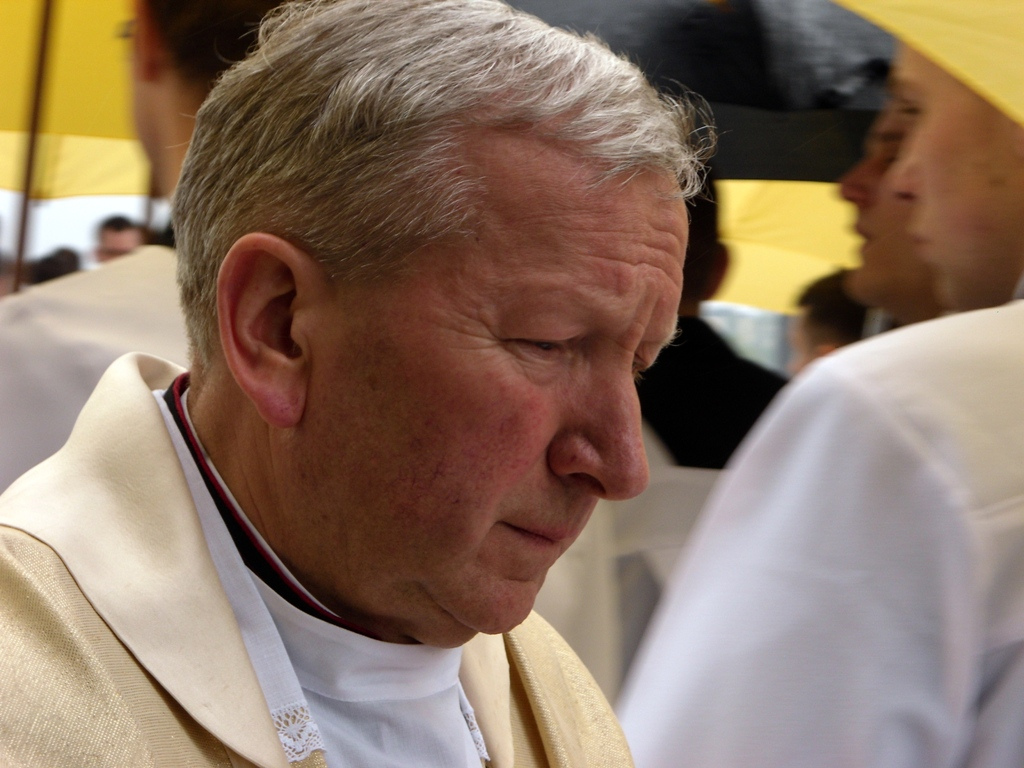
- Appointed: 14 August 2004
- Term ended: 7 October 2014

Orders
- Ordination: 23 June 1963 by Karol Wojtyla
- Consecration: 15 September 2004 by Franciszek Macharski

Personal details
- Born: 20 June 1939 (age 87) Libiąż, Second Polish Republic
- Motto: Surgite, eamus!; (Stand up, let's go!)
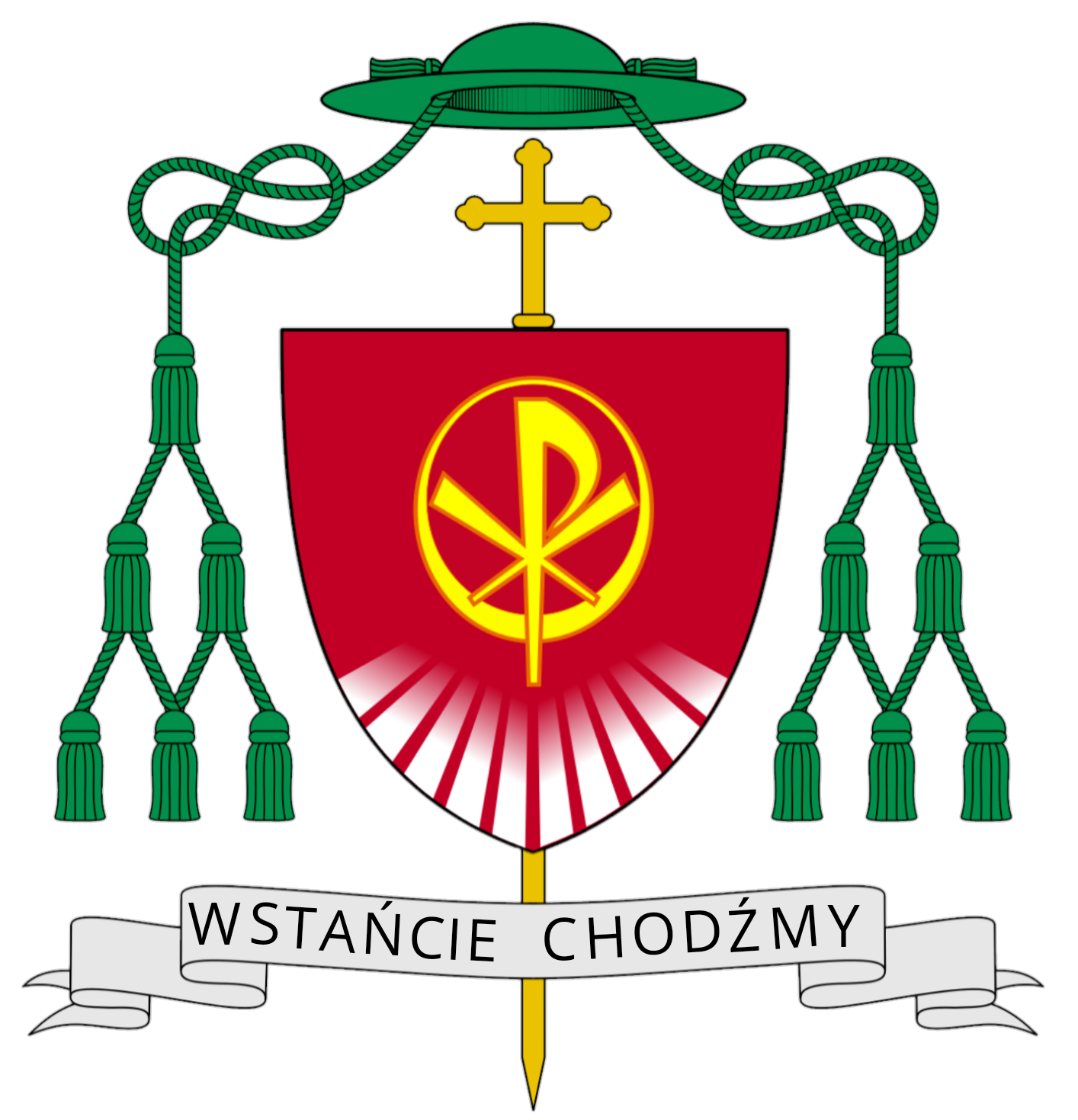
- Coat of arms: Jan Zając's coat of arms

Jan Zając (born 20 June 1939 in Libiąż) is a Polish clergyman and emeritus auxiliary bishop in Krakow.

The Archbishop of Krakow, Karol Józef Wojtyła, consecrated Zając on 23 June 1963. John Paul II appointed him on 14 August 2004 as Auxiliary Bishop of Krakow and titular bishop of Taddua. He was ordained by Franciszek Macharski, Archbishop of Krakow, Józef Kowalczyk, apostolic nuncio in Poland, and Stanisław Dziwisz, prefect of the Prefecture of the Papal House.

His motto is Wstańcie, Chodźmy! and on 7 October 2014 he resigned due to age.

== Biography ==
He was born on 20 June 1939 in Malo Libiąż. Since 1953 was a student of the High School in Chrzanów, where in 1957, he passed the exam of maturity . In the years 1957-1963 he studied philosophy and theology at the Major Seminary of the Archdiocese of Cracow. Ordination to the priesthood gave him 23 June 1963 in the Wawel Cathedral Auxiliary Bishop of Krakow, Karol Wojtyla.

In the years 1963-1971 he worked as a curate successively in the parishes: Our Lady of Perpetual Help in Międzybrodzie Żywiec (1963–1967), Our Lady Queen of Polish in Chełmek (1967–1970) and the Presentation of the Blessed Virgin Mary in Wadowice (1970–1971). In the years 1977-1980 he was the pastor of one of the four areas of the parish of Our Lady Queen of Polish in Nowa Huta . From 1980 to 1984 he worked as a parish priest in the parish of St Stephens Krakow.

From 1971 to 1977 he was employed as spiritual director at the Major Seminary of the Archdiocese of Cracow. In the years 1984-1993 he held the office of the rector of the seminary. In 1993 he was director of the Department of Coordination of the Pastoral of the Archdiocese of Krakow, in June 1998, the spiritual within the framework of the Permanent Study Formation of Priests of the Archdiocese of Krakow. In 1999 he was appointed vicar for Pastoral care. In 2002 he became curator of the Shrine of Divine Mercy in Krakow-Lagiewniki . He became a member of the council of priests, pastoral council and college of consultors . He was endowed with godnościami Canon Chapter of the Metropolitan Castle and protonotariusza apostolic.

On 14 August 2004, together with Joseph Guzdkiem, he was appointed by Pope John Paul II as auxiliary bishop of the Archdiocese of Krakow and titular of Taddua He was ordained bishop, on 15 September 2004 at the Shrine of Divine Mercy in Krakow-Lagiewniki by Franciszek Macharski, Archbishop of Krakow, accompanied by Archbishop Jozef Kowalczyk, the papal nuncio in Poland, and Archbishop Stanislaw Dziwisz, the Prefect of the Papal Household auxiliary. On his cue, episcopal adopted the word "Surgite, eamus! "(Arise, let's go!), From the Gospel of St. Brand and which is also the title of a book of Pope John Paul II

As part of the Polish Episcopal Conference in March 2005 he was chairman of the Team Sanctuaries. He took also the Chairman of the Charity Commission. In addition, he has been chairman of the Board of Caritas Poland. He was appointed vicar general on 7 October 2014.

Pope Francis accepted his resignation from the duties of the Auxiliary Bishop of the Archdiocese of Cracow. In the same year, he ceased to act as custodian of the shrine of Divine Mercy in Krakow-Lagiewniki, being henceforth curator of honor.

He is related (grandfather's brother) to Helena Kmieć, Polish missionary murdered in 2017 in Bolivia.
