= Roman Catholic Diocese of Risano =

Latin Catholic titular see in Montenegro

The Diocese of Risano (Latin Risinium) was a Latin Church ecclesiastical jurisdiction or diocese of the Catholic Church from the 6th to the 17th century and is now a titular see.

== History ==
It was established c. 500 as Diocese of Risano with its episcopal see at Risan, site of the ancient town of Rhizon. It was a suffragan of the Archdiocese of Diocleia in the late Roman province of Dalmatia Superior.

It was suppressed c. 1630, its territory being merged into the Diocese of Kotor, also in modern Montenegro.

=== Episcopal ordinaries ===
Bishops of Risano

(incomplete in the 6th and possibly until the 13th century)

- Sebastiano(591? – 595?)

vacancy?

- Michele, Augustinians (O.E.S.A.)(1271? – ?)
- Davide da Ginevra, O.E.S.A.(1327? – 1349?)
- Nicola, Conventual Friars Minor (O.F.M. Conv.) (? – death 1350?)
- Doimo, O.F.M.(1351.03.28 – 1352.10.25), next Bishop of Kotor (Cattaro) (Montenegro) (1352.10.25 – 1368?)
- Cesario(? – 1355)
- Dionigi(? – 1400), next Bishop of Kotor (Cattaro) (Montenegro) (1400 – ?)
- Andrea (1400 – ?)
- Enrico de Tolnis, Carmelites (O. Carm.) (1400.06.16 – ?)
- Costantino Clementi, O.F.M. (1423.07.09 – ?)
- Egidio Byedborch, O. Carm. (1428.11.29 – ?)
- Antun Bogdanović (1434.04.12 – ?), apparently first Slavic native incumbent
- Giovanni da Montemartino, O.F.M. (1434.09.01 – ?)
- Dionisio Stefani, O. Carm. (1436.10.17 – ?)
- Giovanni Mattei, O. Carm. (1453.01.12 – ?)
- Heinrich Hopfgarten (1455.11.21 – 1460.03.24), also Titular Bishop of Rhosus (1455.11.21 – death 1460.03.24) as Auxiliary Bishop of Mainz (Mayene, western Germany) (1455.11.21 – 1460.03.24)
- Daniele (1470.12.10 – ?)
- Raphael (1487.02.16 – ?)
- Adriano de Arnoldis, O. Carm. (1518.09.18 – ?)
- Antonio Pasquali, O.F.M. Conv. (1520.10.12 – ?)
- Miguel de Sanguesa, Cistercians (O. Cist.) (1537.04.29 – death 1548), also Titular Bishop of Rhosus (1537.04.20 – 1548) as Auxiliary Bishop of Tarazona (Spain) (1537.04.20 – 1548)
- André Tissier, O.F.M. (1551.03.04 – ?)
- György Zalatnaky (1551.03.04 – 1600.12.20), previously Bishop of Knin (? – 1598.04.16); later Bishop of Pécs (Hungary) (1600.12.20 – death 1605)
- Alfonso de Requeséns Fenollet, O.F.M. (1610.08.30 – 1625.10.06); previously Bishop of Duvno (Bosnia and Herzegovina) (1610.08.30 – 1625.10.06); later Bishop of Barbastro (Spain) (1625.10.06 – 1639.04.08)
- Vincenzo Zucconi (1627.08.30 – ?), also Bishop of Duvno (Bosnia and Herzegovina) (1627.08.30 – ?)

== Titular see ==
The diocese was nominally restored in 1933 as Latin Titular bishopric of Risinium (Latin name; Curiate Italian Risinio)

It has had the following incumbents, of the fitting (lowest) episcopal rank with two archiepiscopal exceptions:

- Ubald Langlois, Missionary Oblates of Mary Immaculate (O.M.I.) (1938.03.30 – 1953.09.18)
- Alphonse-Célestin-Basile Baud, Capuchin Frirs Minor (O.F.M. Cap.) (1954.04.10 – 1955.09.14)
- Raul Zambrano Camader (1956.12.29 – 1962.04.26)
- Charles Borromeo McLaughlin (1964.01.13 – 1968.05.02)
- Titular Archbishop Paolo Botto (1969.05.02 – 1970.12.03)
- Titular Archbishop Reginaldo Giuseppe Maria Addazi, Dominican Order (O.P.) (1971.07.03 – 1975.02.07)
- Giovanni Pes (1975.04.25 – 1979.05.23)
- Władysław Ziółek (1980.03.12 – 1986.01.24)
- Abraham Escudero Montoya (1986.05.22 – 1990.04.30)
- John Richard McNamara (1992.04.14 – 2001.04.16)
- Bishop Gáspár Ladocsi (2001.11.28 – ...), Auxiliary Bishop emeritus of Esztergom–Budapest (Hungary)

== Sources and external links ==
- GCatholic
