= Archdiocese of Łódź =

Roman Catholic archdiocese in Poland

Coordinates: 51°44′56″N 19°27′35″E

Archdiocese of Łódź Archidioecesis Lodziensis Archidiecezja Metropolita łódzka

Catholic
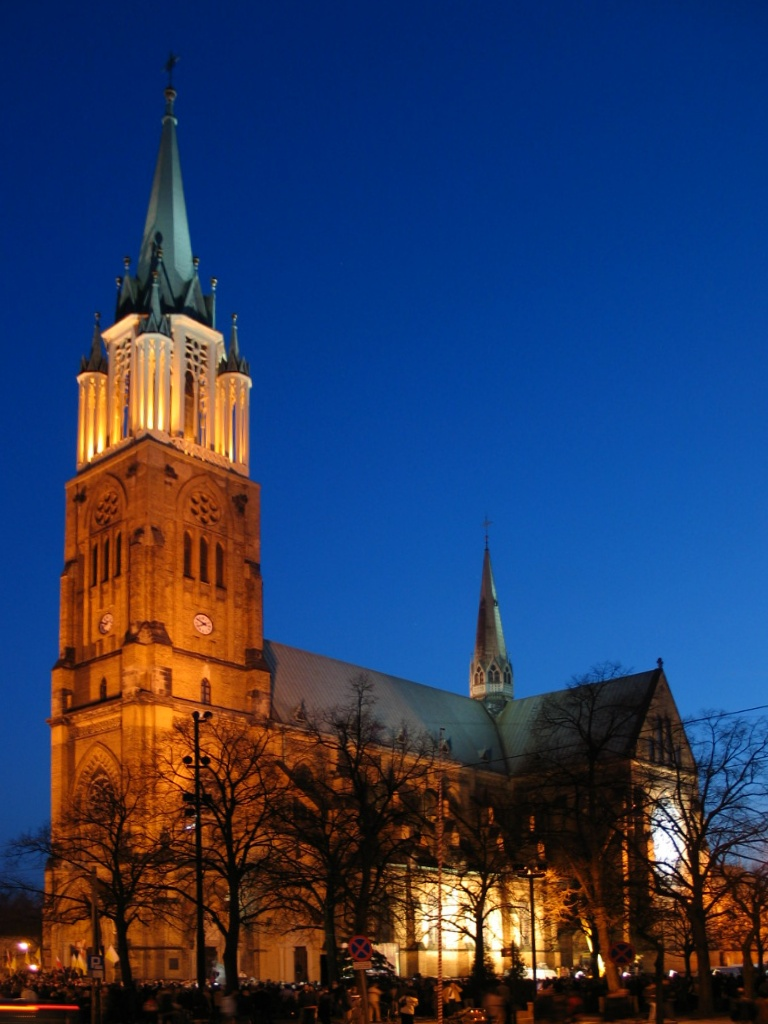
- Cathedral Basilica of St Stanislaus Kostka in Łódź

Location
- Country: Poland

Statistics
- Area: 5,200 km^{2} (2,000 sq mi)
- Population: Total; Catholics: (as of 2019); 1,410,000; 1,330,000 (94.3%)

Information
- Denomination: Catholic Church
- Sui iuris church: Latin Church
- Rite: Roman Rite
- Established: 10 December 1920 (As Diocese of Łódź); 25 March 1992 (As Archdiocese of Łódź)
- Cathedral: Bazylika Archikatedralna pw. Świętego Stanisława Kostki (Cathedral Basilica of St. Stanislaus Kostka)

Current leadership
- Pope: Leo XIV
- Metropolitan Archbishop: Konrad Krajewski
- Suffragans: Diocese of Łowicz
- Auxiliary Bishops: Marek Marczak; Piotr Kleszcz; Zbigniew Wolkowicz
- Bishops emeritus: Władysław Ziółek; Ireneusz Pękalski

Website
- Website of the Diocese

The Archdiocese of Łódź (Latin: Archidioecesis Lodziensis) is a Latin Church archdiocese of the Catholic Church located in the city of Łódź in Poland. The archdiocese covers the central area of Łódź Voivodeship. As of 2016 weekly mass attendance was 23.4% of the archdiocese's Catholic population, making it the second least devout diocese in Poland after the Archdiocese of Szczecin-Kamień (22.7%).

== History ==
- December 10, 1920: Established as Diocese of Łódź
- March 25, 1992: Promoted as Metropolitan Archdiocese of Łódź

== Leadership ==
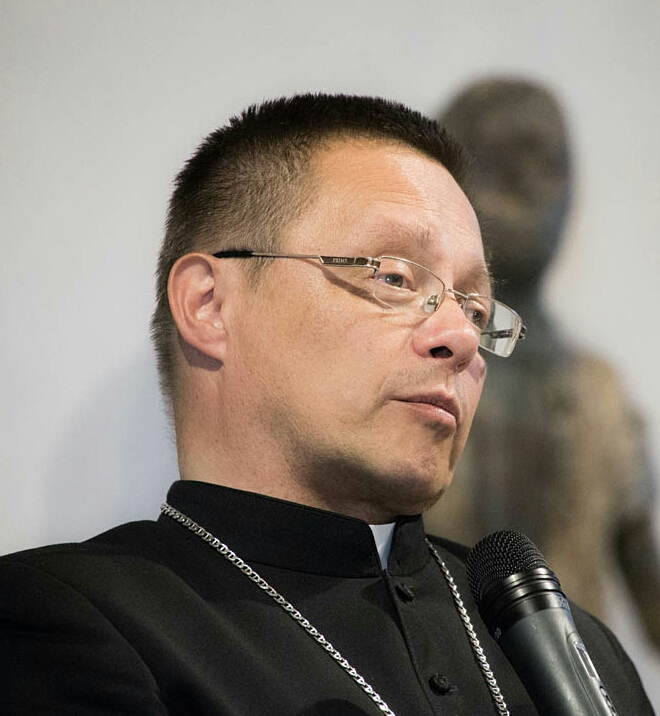
Archbishop Grzegorz Ryś

Bishops

- Vincenzo Tymieniecki (1921.04.11 – 1934.08.10)
- Włodzimierz Jasiński (1934.11.30 – 1946.12.12)
- Michał Klepacz (1946.12.20 – 1967.01.29)
- Józef Rozwadowski (1968.10.29 – 1986.01.24)
- Władysław Ziółek (1986.01.24 – 1992.03.25)

Metropolitan Archbishops

- Władysław Ziółek (1992.03.25 – 2012.07.11)
- Marek Jędraszewski (2012.07.11 – 2017.01.27)
- Grzegorz Ryś (2017.09.14 – 2025.11.26) (cardinal in 2023)
- Konrad Krajewski (elect) (2026.03.12 – present) (cardinal in 2018)

== Suffragan dioceses ==
- Łowicz

== See also ==
- Roman Catholicism in Poland
