= Grzegorz Ryś =

Polish Catholic prelate (born 1964)

His Eminence Grzegorz Ryś
- Cardinal, Archbishop of Kraków
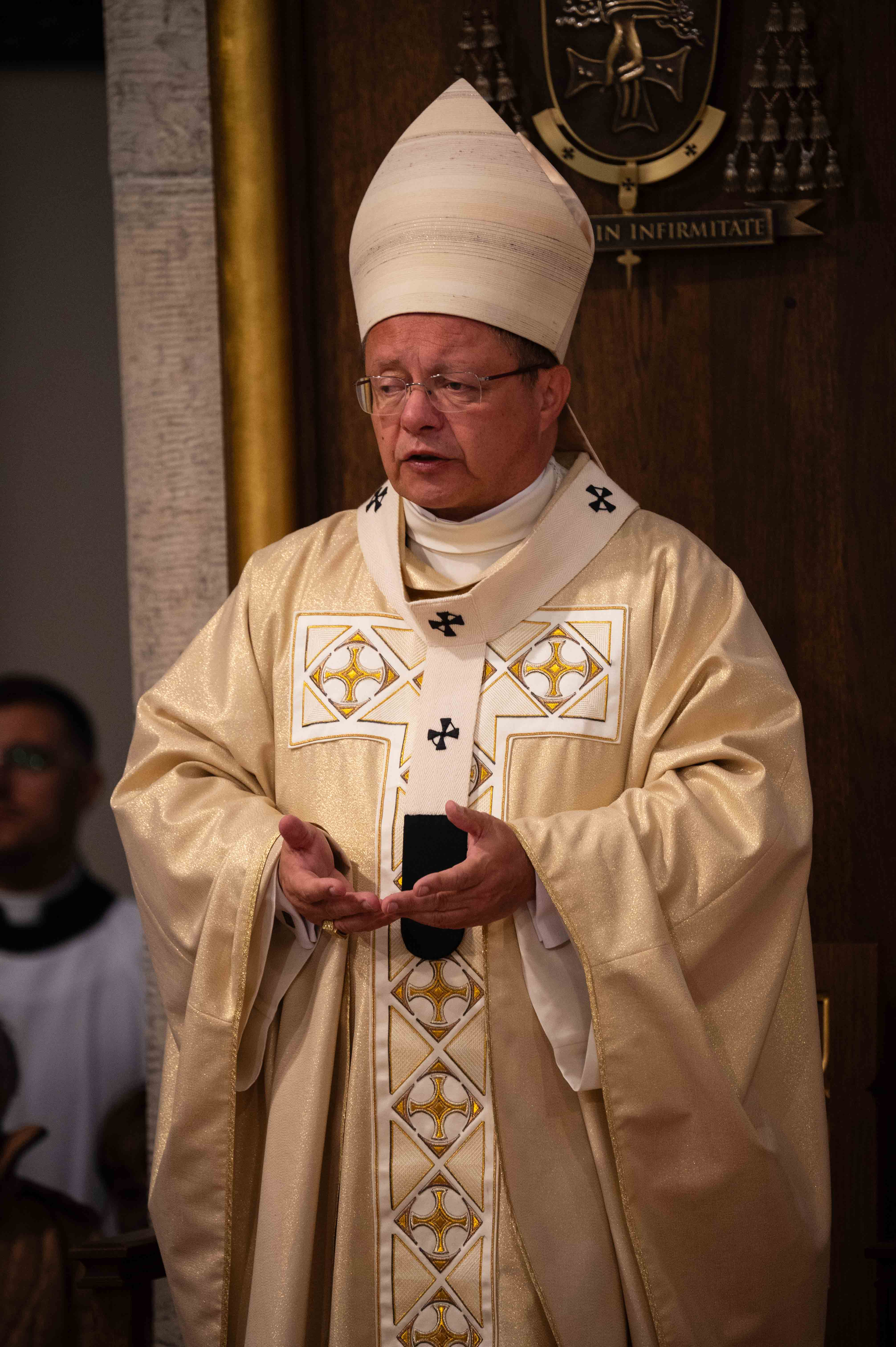
- Ryś in 2024
- Church: Roman Catholic Church
- Archdiocese: Kraków
- Appointed: 26 November 2025
- Installed: 20 December 2025
- Predecessor: Marek Jędraszewski
- Other post: Cardinal-Priest of Santi Cirillo e Metodio (2023–present)
- Previous posts: Auxiliary Bishop of Kraków (2011–17); Titular Bishop of Arcavica (2011–17); Apostolic Administrator of Kalisz (2020–21); Metropolitan Archbishop of Łódź (2017–25)

Orders
- Ordination: 22 May 1988 by Franciszek Macharski
- Consecration: 28 September 2011 by Stanisław Dziwisz
- Created cardinal: 30 September 2023 by Pope Francis
- Rank: Cardinal-Priest

Personal details
- Born: 9 February 1964 (age 62) Kraków, Poland
- Motto: Virtus in infirmitate (Power in weakness)

- Coat of arms

Ordination history of Grzegorz Ryś
History
Priestly ordination
- Ordained by: Franciszek Macharski
- Date: 22 May 1988
- Place: The Royal Archcathedral Basilica of Saints Stanislaus and Wenceslaus on the Wawel Hill
Episcopal consecration
- Principal consecrator: Stanisław Dziwisz
- Co-consecrators: Franciszek Macharski; Stanisław Ryłko
- Date: 28 September 2011
- Place: The Royal Archcathedral Basilica of Saints Stanislaus and Wenceslaus on the Wawel Hill
Cardinalate
- Elevated by: Pope Francis
- Date: 30 September 2023

Styles of Grzegorz Ryś
- Reference style: His Eminence
- Spoken style: Your Eminence
- Religious style: Cardinal
- Informal style: Cardinal

Grzegorz Wojciech Ryś (born 9 February 1964) is a Polish Catholic prelate, academic and theologian who has served as Archbishop of Kraków since 2025. He was previously an auxiliary bishop of the Archdiocese of Kraków from 2011 to 2017 and Archbishop of Łódź from 2017 to 2025. He also served as an apostolic administrator of the Diocese of Kalisz from 2020 to 2021. Pope Francis made Ryś a cardinal in 2023.

== Biography ==
=== Early life ===
Grzegorz Wojciech Ryś was born on 9 February 1964 in Kraków. In 1982–1988, he studied at the Faculty of Theology and the Faculty of History of the Church of the Pontifical Academy of Theology in Krakow, today Pontifical University of John Paul II, as well as at the Major Seminary of the Metropolitan Archdiocese of Kraków. He was ordained a priest on 22 May 1988 in the Wawel Cathedral by Cardinal Franciszek Macharski, then the Metropolitan Archbishop of Kraków. In 1994, Ryś earned a doctorate in theological sciences based on his dissertation about Medieval folk piety in Poland. In 2000, having completed a dissertation on Jan Hus, Ryś obtained a post-doctoral degree in the field of history.

=== Priestly ministry ===
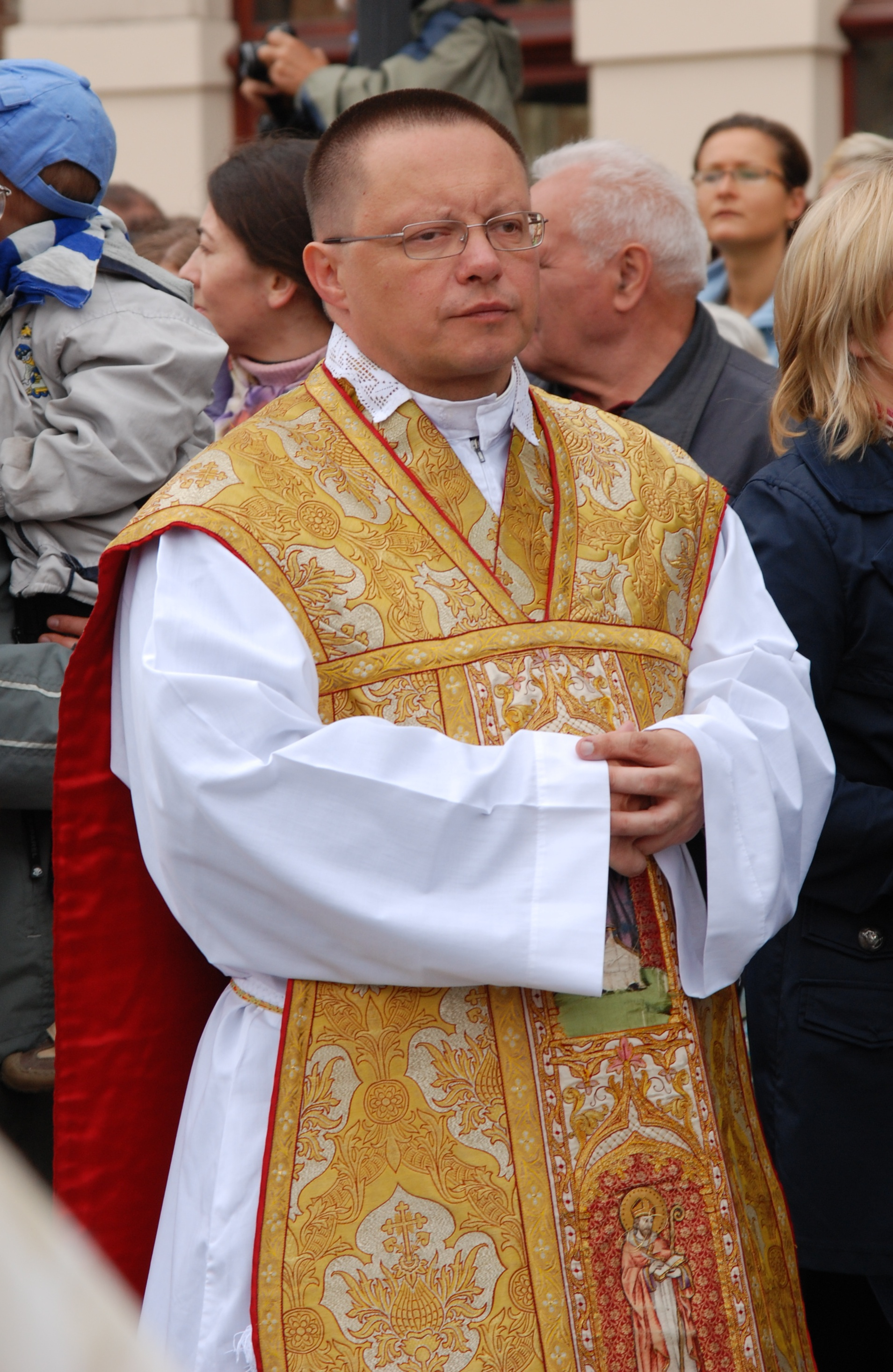
Ryś as a priest, 2008

From 1988 to 1989, Ryś worked as a vicar in the parish of Saints Margaret and Catherine in Kęty. From 2004 to 2007, he was the director of the Archives of the Metropolitan Chapter in Kraków. He was also a commentator on the pilgrimages of John Paul II on Polish Television and Polish Radio. After the latter's death, Ryś co-organized vigils, while during the beatification process he sat on the historical commission of the Rogatory Tribunal.

He became the head of the Department of Church History in the Middle Ages and the Department of Ancient and Medieval History at the Institute of History at the Faculty of History and Cultural Heritage of the Pontifical University of John Paul II. From 2007 to 2011, Ryś was the rector of the Major Seminary of the Archdiocese of Kraków. In the years 2010 and 2011, he also served as chairman of the Conference of Rectors of the Theological Seminary in Poland.

=== Auxiliary Bishop of Kraków ===
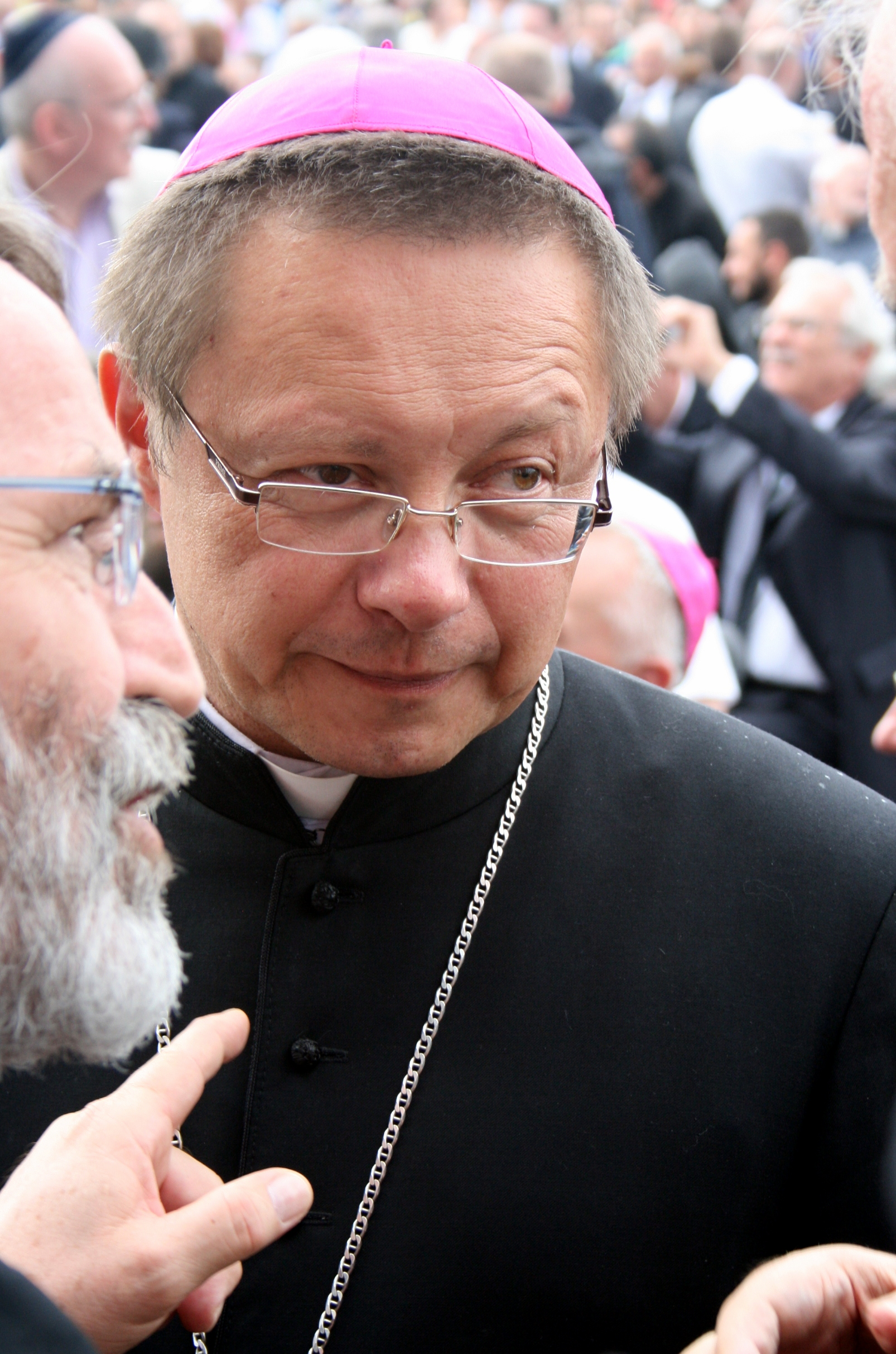
Ryś as a bishop, 2013

On 16 July 2011, Ryś was appointed by Pope Benedict XVI as auxiliary bishop of the Archdiocese of Kraków as well as the titular bishop of Arcavica. He was ordained on 28 September 2011 in the Wawel Cathedral, with the consecrator being Cardinal Stanisław Dziwisz, metropolitan archbishop of Kraków, and co-consecrators Cardinals Franciszek Macharski, archbishop emeritus of Kraków, and Stanisław Ryłko, chairman of the Pontifical Council for the Laity. Ryś chose "Virtus in infirmitate" (Power in Weakness) as his episcopal motto.

=== Metropolitan Archbishop of Łódź ===
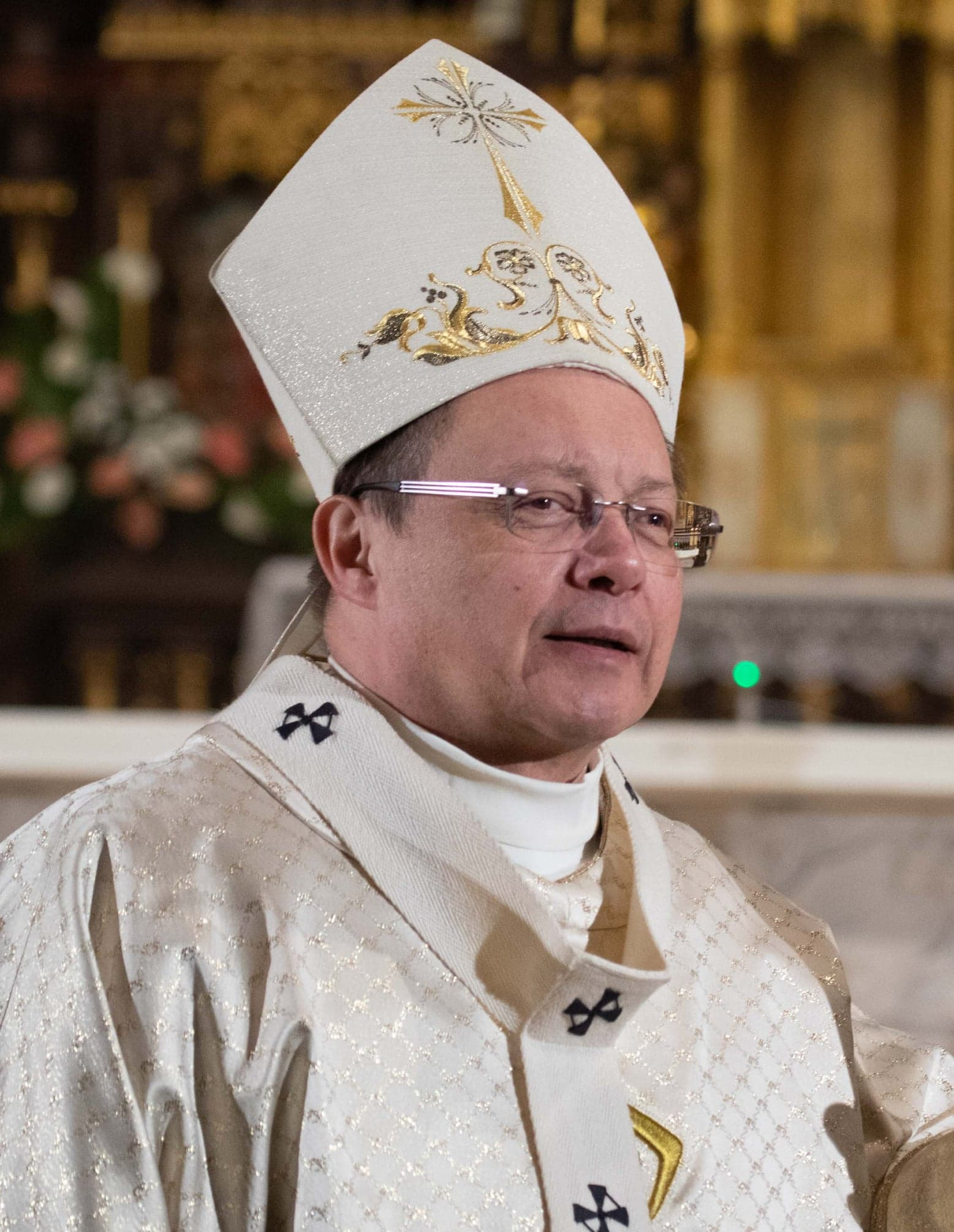
Archbishop Ryś during the Easter Vigil 2020 in Łodź.

On 14 September 2017 Pope Francis appointed Ryś metropolitan archbishop of Łódź. He was installed as archbishop in the Archcathedral Basilica of St. Stanislaus Kostka on 4 November 2017. On 29 June 2018 was given his pallium in a ceremony at St. Peter's Basilica in Rome, and it was imposed on him on 5 October 2018 in the Łódź cathedral by Archbishop Salvatore Pennacchio, the Apostolic Nuncio in Poland.

In 2018, Ryś convened the fourth synod in the history of the Archdiocese of Łódź, which considered introducing a permanent diaconate to combat the shortage of priests. In 2019, he introduced a permanent diaconate within his archdiocese, and also created the International Diocesan Missionary Seminary for the new Evangelization of Redemptoris Mater for seminarians who are part of the Neocatechumenal Way.

On 25 June 2020 Ryś was appointed by Pope Francis as the Apostolic Administrator sede plena for the Diocese of Kalisz while Bishop Edward Janiak was investigated on charges he had protected "predator priests" who engaged in acts of sex abuse. He was named Apostolic Administrator sede vacante when Pope Francis accepted Janiak's resignation on 17 October 2020. His responsibilities ended when the new bishop of Kalisz, Damian Bryl, was installed on 11 February 2021.

On 21 November 2020, Pope Francis named him a member of the Congregation for Bishops.

=== Cardinal ===
On 9 July 2023, Pope Francis announced that he planned to make Ryś a cardinal. At a consistory on 30 September 2023, Ryś was made Cardinal-Priest of Santi Cirillo e Metodio. He participated as a cardinal elector in the 2025 papal conclave that elected Pope Leo XIV.

=== Metropolitan Archbishop of Kraków ===
On 26 November 2025 Pope Leo XIV appointed Ryś metropolitan archbishop of Kraków.

== See also ==
- Cardinals created by Francis
