= Komorniki, Gmina Wolbórz =

Komorniki
- Village
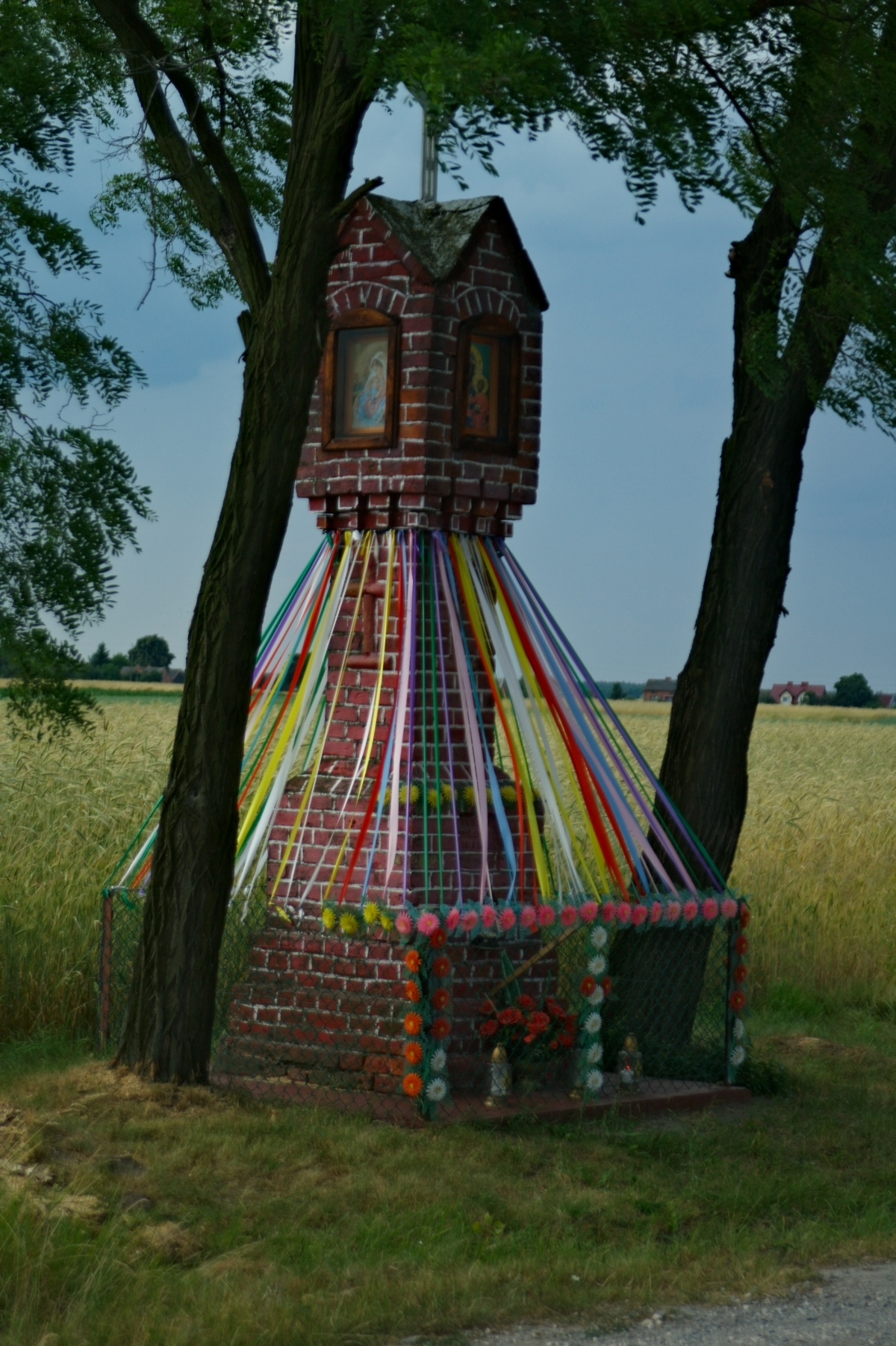

- Location within Poland
- Coordinates: 51°32′16″N 19°51′44″E
- Country: Poland
- Voivodeship: Łódź
- County: Piotrków
- Gmina: Wolbórz
- Population: 400

Komorniki [kɔmɔrˈniki] is a village in the administrative district of Gmina Wolbórz, within Piotrków County, Łódź Voivodeship, in central Poland.
