= Diocese of Kalisz =

Roman Catholic diocese in Poland

Coordinates: 51°45′51″N 18°05′20″E

Diocese of Kalisz Dioecesis Calissiensis Diecezja Kaliska

Catholic
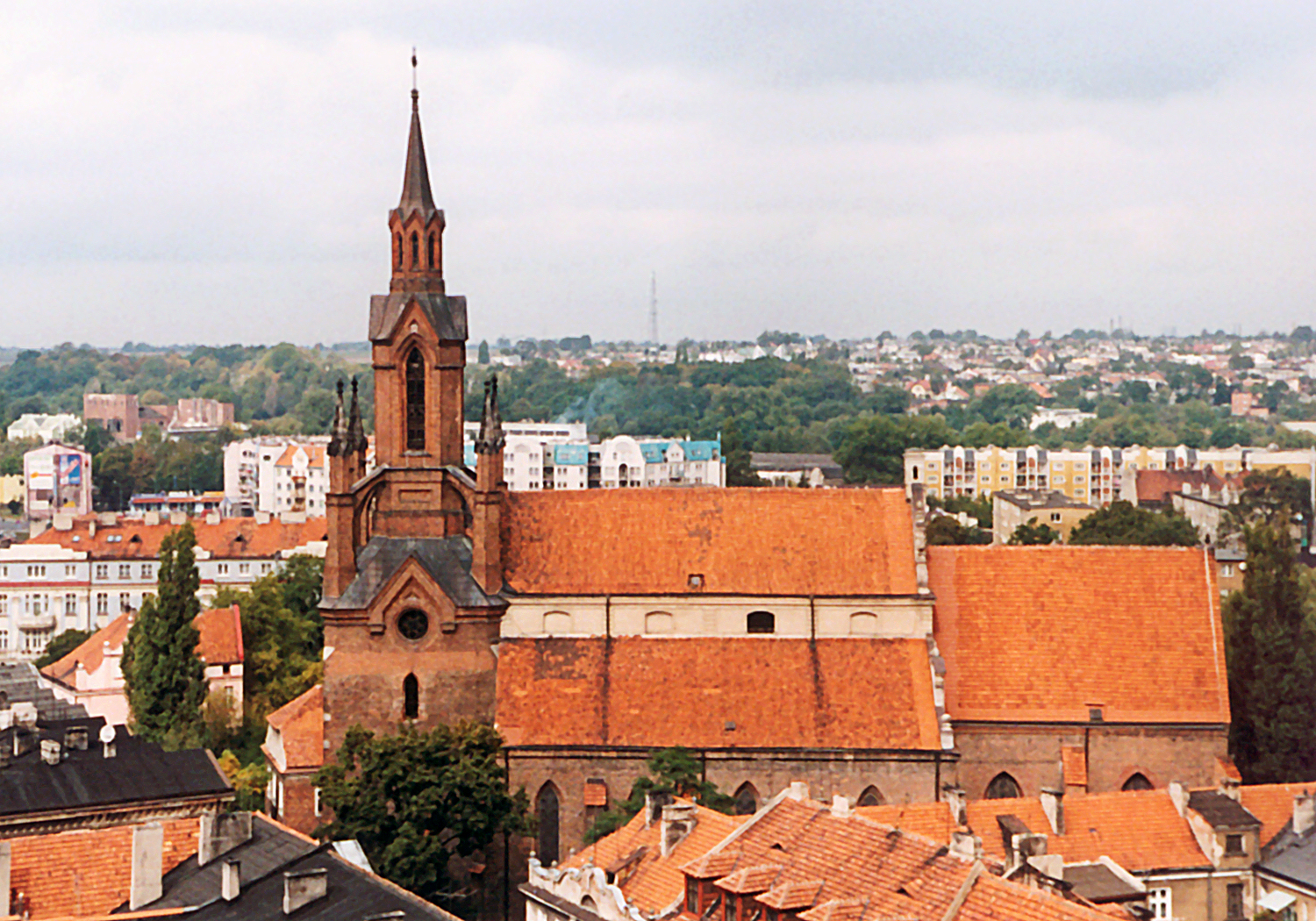
- St Nicholas Cathedral in Kalisz

Location
- Country: Poland
- Ecclesiastical province: Poznań
- Metropolitan: Archdiocese of Poznań

Statistics
- Area: 10,800 km^{2} (4,200 sq mi)
- Population: Total; Catholics: (as of 2019); 733,839; 727,672 (99.2%)

Information
- Denomination: Catholic Church
- Rite: Latin Rite
- Cathedral: Katedra św. Mikołaja (Cathedral of St. Nicholas) Kalisz
- Co-cathedral: Konkatedra św. Stanisława in Ostrów Wielkopolski (Co-Cathedral of St. Stanislaus) in Ostrów Wielkopolski

Current leadership
- Pope: Leo XIV
- Bishop: Damian Bryl
- Metropolitan Archbishop: Stanisław Gądecki
- Auxiliary Bishops: Łukasz Buzun O.S.P.P.E.
- Vicar General: Andrzej Latoń
- Bishops emeritus: Stanisław Napierała

Website
- www.diecezja.kalisz.pl

Map of Diocese of Kalisz

The Diocese of Kalisz (Latin: Dioecesis Calissiensis)) is a Latin diocese of the Catholic Church located in the city of Kalisz in the ecclesiastical province of Poznań in Poland.

== History ==
- 30 June 1818 : the Diocese of Włocławek is renamed (after the papal bull Ex imposita nobis) Diocese of Cuiavia-Kalisz with the seat in Kalisz for over a century but this diocese returned to its first name on 28 October 1925.
- 25 March 1992: Established as the Diocese of Kalisz from the Diocese of Częstochowa, Metropolitan Archdiocese of Wrocław and Metropolitan Archdiocese of Gniezno
- 25 June 2020: Pope Francis relieves Bishop Edward Janiak, age 67, of his responsibilities while he is investigating on charges of protecting "predator priests" who committed acts of sex abuse. On October 17, 2020, Pope Francis permanently removed Janiak as Bishop of Kalisz.

== Special churches ==
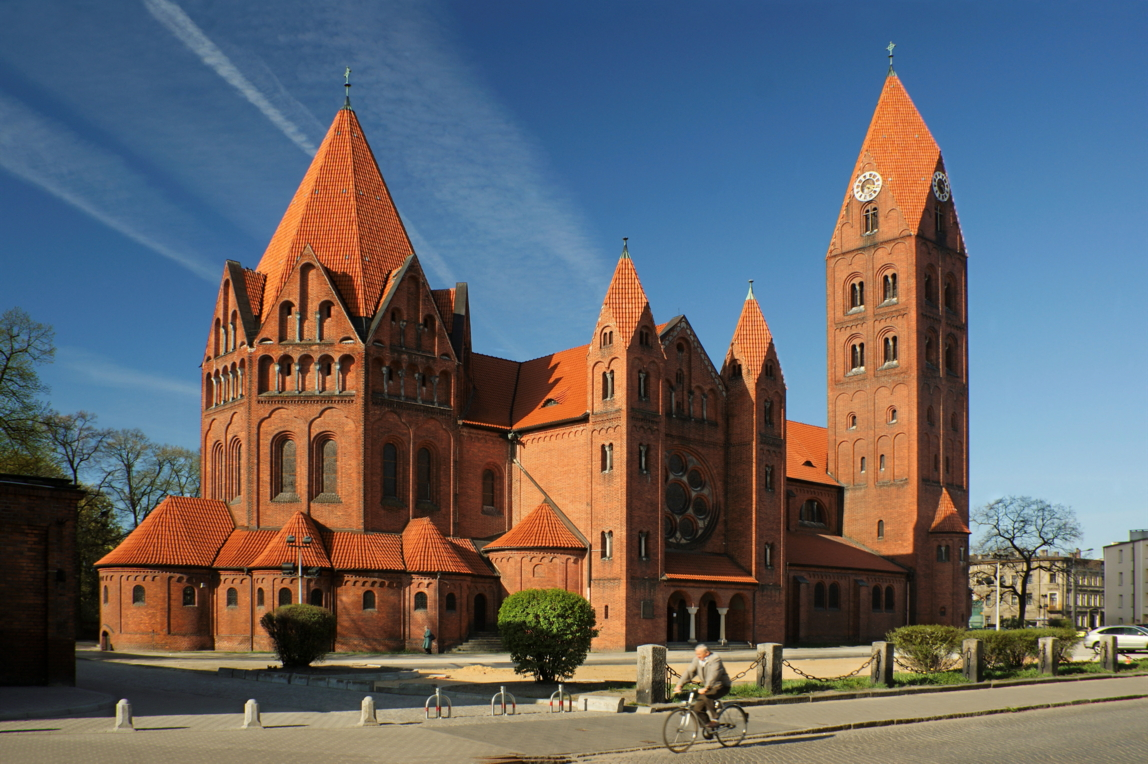
Co-Cathedral of St Stanislaus in Ostrów Wielkopolski

- Minor Basilicas:
  - Bazylika Matki Bożej Wspomożenia Wiernych, Twardogóra
  - Bazylika św. Józefa, Kalisz (Basilica of St Joseph)

== Bishops ==
=== Ordinaries ===
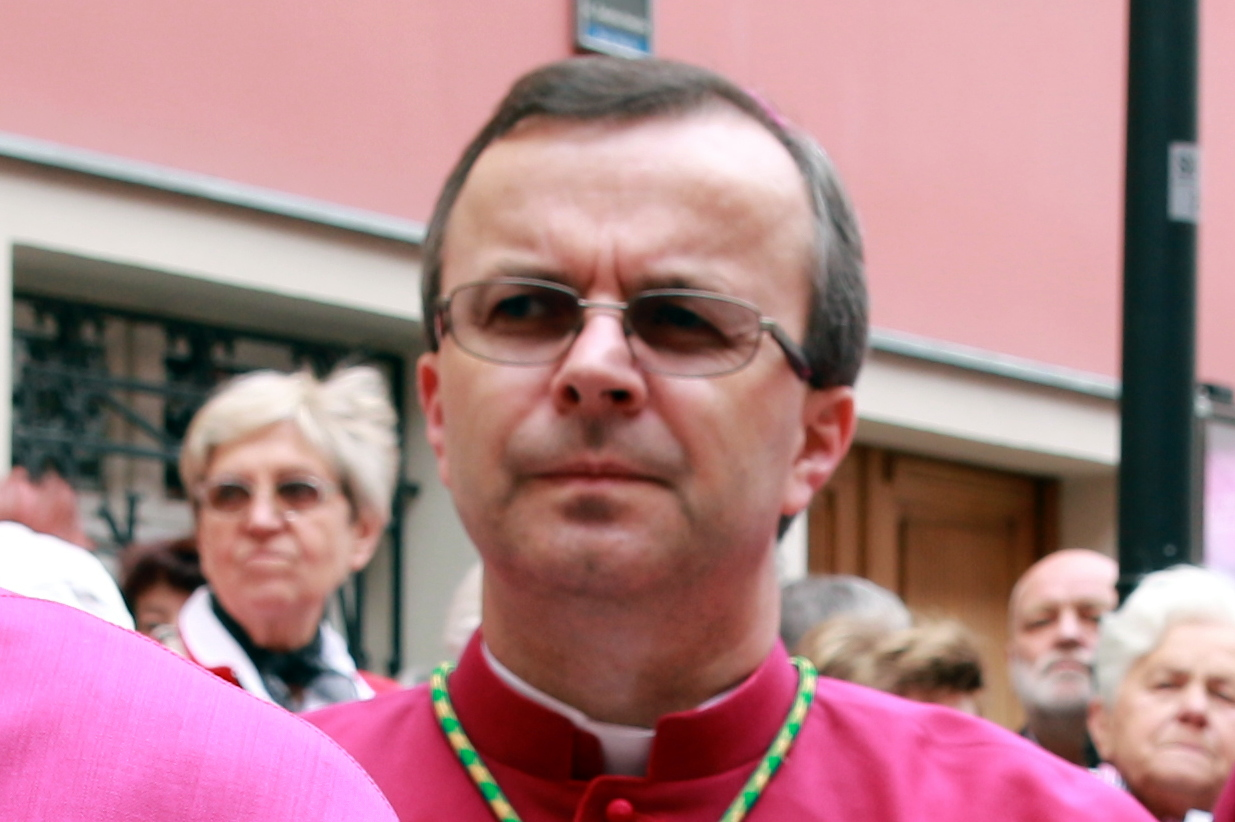
Bishop Damian Bryl

- Bishop Stanisław Napierała (25 March 1992 – 21 July 2012)
- Bishop Edward Janiak (21 July 2012 – 17 October 2020)
  - Apostolic Administrator Grzegorz Ryś (25 June 2020 – 11 February 2021)
- Bishop Damian Bryl (11 February 2021 – present)

=== Auxiliary Bishops ===
- Teofil Józef Wilski (1995–2011)
- Łukasz Mirosław Buzun, O.S.P.P.E. (2014–present)

== See also ==
- Roman Catholicism in Poland
