= Archdiocese of Kraków =

Roman Catholic diocese based in Kraków, Poland

Metropolitan Archdiocese of Kraków Archidioecesis Metropolitae Cracoviensis Archidiecezja Krakowska

Catholic
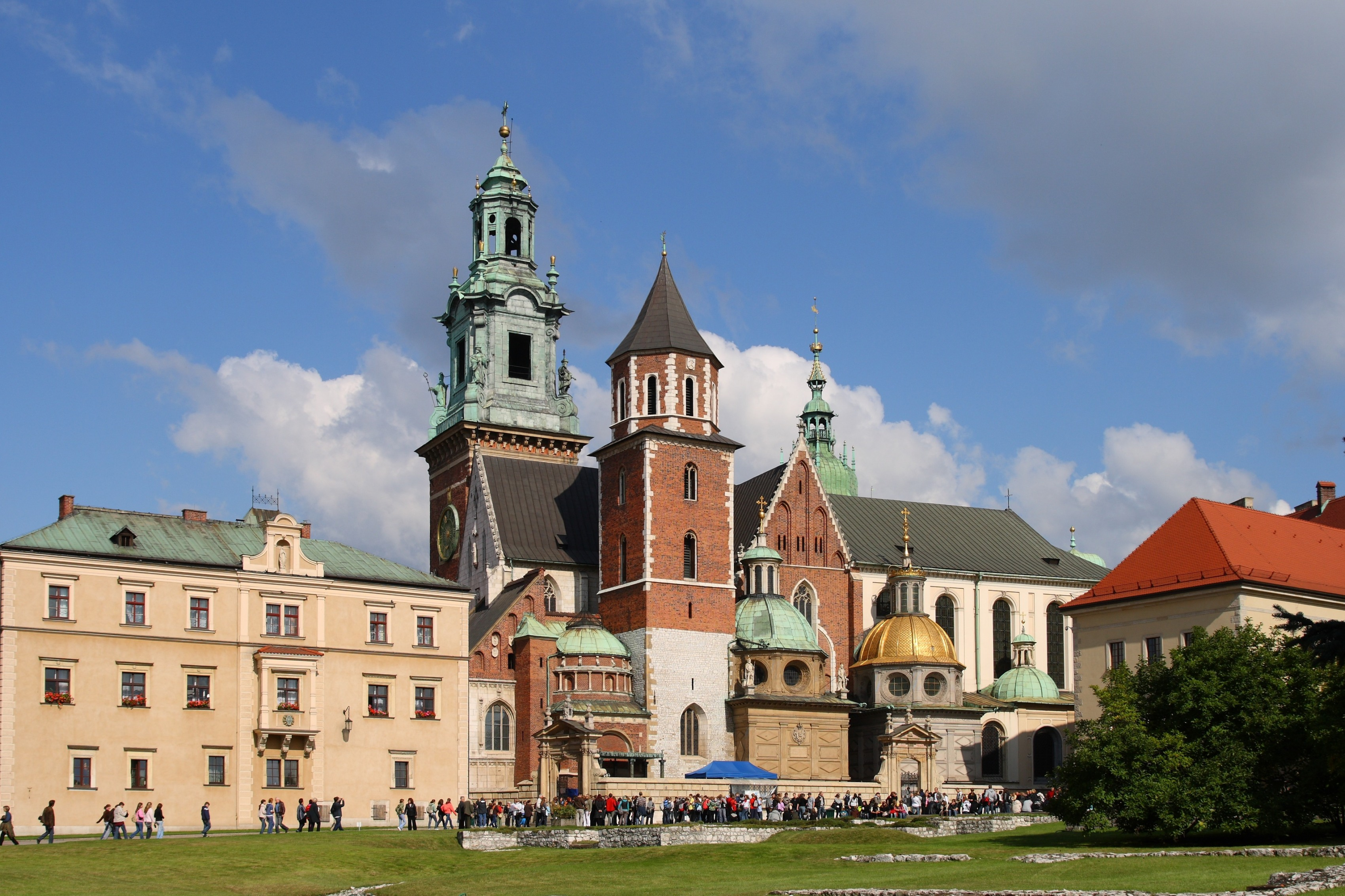
- Wawel Cathedral

Location
- Country: Poland
- Coordinates: 50°03′35″N 19°56′05″E

Statistics
- Area: 5,730 km^{2} (2,210 sq mi)
- Population: Total; Catholics: (as of 2021); 1,627,236; 1,575,724 (96.8%)
- Parishes: 448

Information
- Denomination: Catholic
- Sui iuris church: Latin Church
- Rite: Roman Rite
- Cathedral: Katedra Wawelska
- Patron saint: St. Stanislaus; St. John Paul II

Current leadership
- Pope: Leo XIV
- Metropolitan Archbishop: Grzegorz Wojciech Ryś
- Auxiliary Bishops: Damian Muskus; Janusz Mastalski; Robert Chrząszcz
- Bishops emeritus: Marek Jędraszewski; Stanisław Dziwisz; Jan Zając

The Metropolitan Archdiocese of Kraków (Latin: Archidioecesis Metropolitae Cracovien(sis), Polish: Archidiecezja Krakowska) is an archdiocese of the Latin Church located in the city of Kraków in Poland. As of 2013 weekly mass attendance was 51.3% of the population (fourth highest in Poland after the dioceses of: Tarnów-69.0%, Rzeszów-64.1% and Przemyśl-58.8%).

== History ==
- 1000: Established as Diocese of Kraków from the Diocese of Poznań
- October 28, 1925: Promoted as Metropolitan Archdiocese of Kraków

== Special churches ==
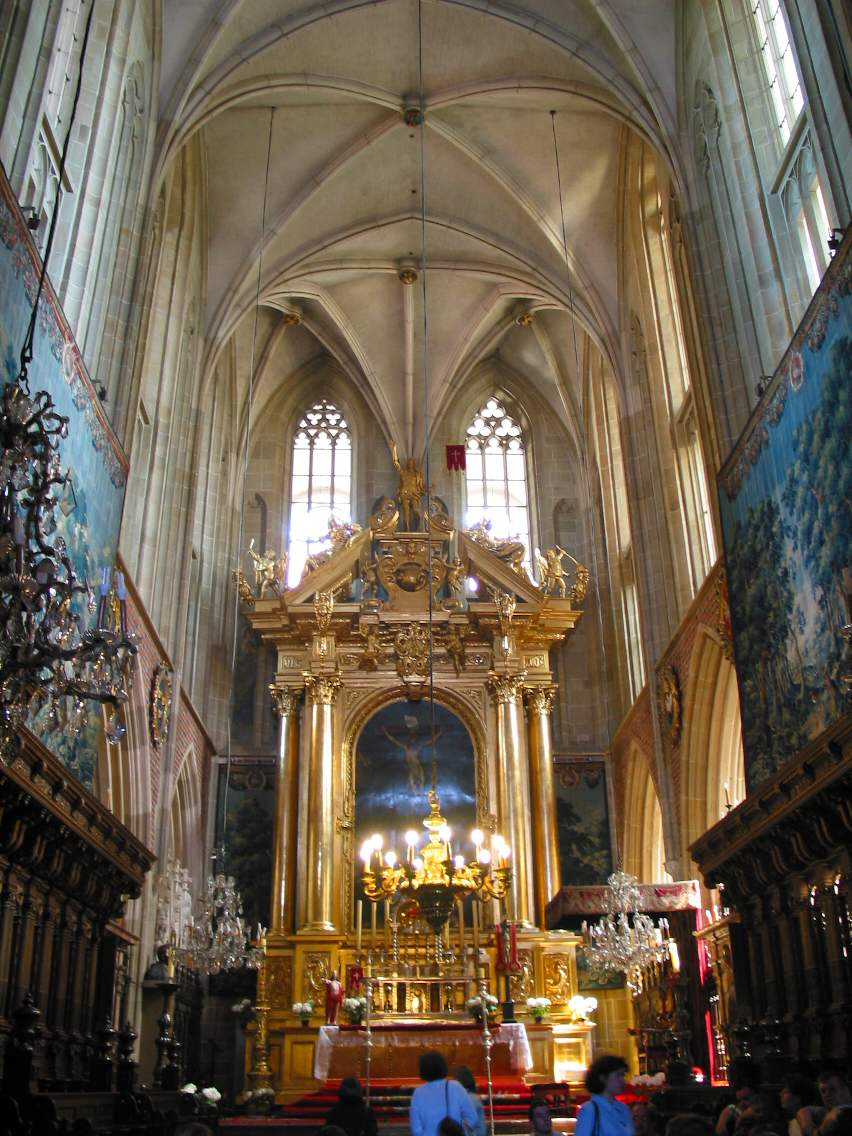
Wawel Bazylika

Minor Basilicas

- Basilica of the Body and Blood of Christ, Kazimierz
- Bazylika Najświętszego Serca Pana Jezusa, Kraków
- Bazylika Nawiedzenia NMP, Kraków
- Bazylika Ofiarowania Najświętszej Maryi Panny, Wadowice
- Bazylika św. Floriana, Kraków (Kleparz)
- Bazylika św. Franciszka z Asyżu OO. Franciszkanów, Kraków
- Bazylika Trójcy Świętej OO. Dominikanów, Kraków
- Bazylika Wniebowzięcia Najświętszej Marii Panny (Bazylika Mariacka), Kraków
- Sanktuarium Pasyjno - Maryjne, Kalwaria Zebrzydowska

Minor & International Shrine

- Bazylika Bożego Miłosierdzia, Kraków-Łagiewniki

== Leadership ==
- List of bishops of Kraków

== Suffragan dioceses ==
- Bielsko–Żywiec
- Kielce
- Tarnów

== See also ==
- Catholic Church in Poland
- The Lesser Polish Way

== Sources ==
- GCatholic.org
- Catholic Hierarchy
- Diocese website
