= Marek Jędraszewski =

Polish Roman Catholic prelate (born 1949)

His Excellency, The Most Reverend, Monsignor Marek Jędraszewski
- Metropolitan Archbishop Emeritus of Kraków
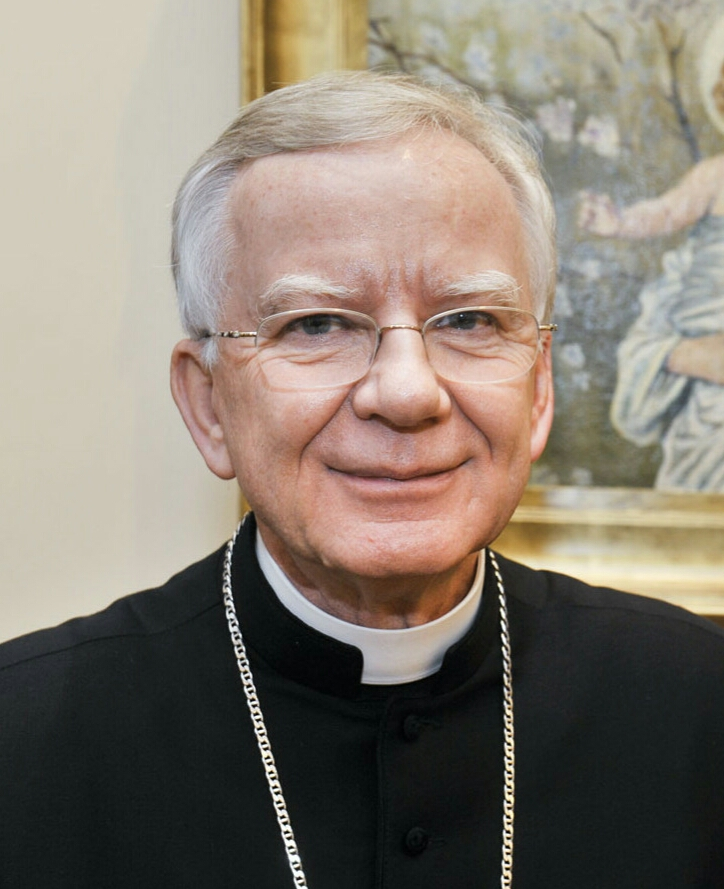
- Church: Latin Church
- Archdiocese: Kraków
- Metropolis: Kraków
- See: Kraków
- Appointed: 8 December 2016
- Installed: 28 January 2017
- Term ended: 26 November 2025
- Predecessor: Stanisław Dziwisz
- Successor: Grzegorz Ryś
- Other post: Vice-President of the Polish Episcopal Conference (2014–)
- Previous posts: Titular Bishop of Forlimpopoli (1997–2012); Auxiliary Bishop of Poznań (1997–2012); Metropolitan Archbishop of Łódź (2012–16)

Orders
- Ordination: 24 May 1973 by Antoni Baraniak
- Consecration: 29 June 1997 by Juliusz Paetz
- Rank: Metropolitan Archbishop

Personal details
- Born: Marek Jędraszewski; 24 July 1949 (age 77) Poznań, Polish People's Republic
- Education: Adam Mickiewicz University; Pontifical Gregorian University
- Motto: Scire Christum ("To know Christ")
- Coat of arms

Marek Jędraszewski (born 24 July 1949) is a Polish Catholic prelate who served as Metropolitan Archbishop of Kraków from 2016 to 2025. He served as Metropolitan Archbishop of Łódź from 2012 to 2017. He has also been vice president of the Polish Episcopal Conference since 2014.

Jędraszewski's selection for the Kraków Archdiocese was perceived as a surprise in some quarters.

== Life ==
Marek Jędraszewski was born in Poznań, earned his high school diploma in 1967 and then pursued ecclesial studies until 1973. In mid-1973, he received his ordination to the priesthood from Bishop Antoni Baraniak. Jędraszewski then studied philosophy at the Pontifical Gregorian University, where he earned a doctorate. In 1974 he earned a bachelor's degree in theological studies in Poznań, and from 1973 to 1975 served as a parochial vicar at Saint Martin's parish in Odalnów. He received his bachelor's degree philosophy 1977. On 20 December 1979, he defended his doctoral dissertation and Pope John Paul II awarded it a gold medal.

From 1980 until 1996, he served in Poznań as an assistant professor and as the prefect of seminarians from 1980 until 1987. From 1987 until 1996, he served as the editor (chief editor since 1990) of the Catholic Guide paper, and in 1996 he did his habilitation degree in Kraków on Jean-Paul Sartre and Emmanuel Levinas. In 1996, Jędraszewski was made an associate professor in Poznań and was also made a visiting professor to the Pontifical Lateran.

John Paul II appointed him Auxiliary Bishop of Poznań on 17 May 1997, and he received his episcopal consecration on 29 June 1997 from Juliusz Paetz. Pope Benedict XVI appointed him Metropolitan Archbishop of Lodz on 11 July 2012 and he was enthroned there on 8 September. Pope Francis appointed him Metropolitan Archbishop of Kraków to succeed Cardinal Stanisław Dziwisz, and he was installed there on 28 January 2017.

He attended the ad limina visit of bishops with Pope Francis on 1 February 2014. Francis appointed him a member of the Congregation for Catholic Education on 30 November 2013.

In 2013, he launched an initiative called "Dialogues in the Cathedral" that became extremely popular. People could send the archbishop an email asking about an aspect of the faith, and he would answer once a month at open meetings in the cathedral.

In 2014 he was elected vice president of the Polish Episcopal Conference.

Pope Francis named him archbishop of Krakow on 8 December 2016.

Pope Leo XIV accepted his resignation on 26 November 2025.

== Views ==
=== IVF treatments ===
When Poland's government began to subsidize in vitro treatments, he said that IVF was an assault on the dignities of all people and suggested that infertile couples should resort to adoption rather than something that would go above the creative power.

=== Abortion ===
Jędraszewski opposes abortion in all circumstances and advocates "the legal protection of human life from conception to natural death".

=== Transgender and LGBT rights ===
The archbishop is a strong opponent of transgender rights, referring to it as the "direct path to the self-destruction of our civilization". He was speaking at an adolescent catechesis in Pabianice about the importance of accepting one's own gender when he called upon people to oppose "misanthropic egalitarianism", which he lamented has "become fashionable in recent years". Jędraszewski called "gender ideology" an "extremely dangerous ideology that leads directly to the death of our civilization". During a sermon on August 1, 2019, Jedraszewski called "LGBT ideology" a "rainbow plague" and compared it to the "red plague" of Communism.

=== Halloween ===
In 2013, the archbishop urged the faithful not to take part in the celebrations of Halloween "even in playful form". He dubbed it an "anti-Christian festival", and urged both parents and teachers to protect children "against its images of terror and dread" that were the opposite of the Christian message. He issued a pastoral letter dedicated to this, and said that introducing people to Halloween "is a violation of Church teaching", while urging them to observe All Saints Day and All Souls Day.

== Friendship with Pope John Paul II ==
Jędraszewski was a close friend of Pope John Paul II. The two men became friends in 1975 when Jędraszewski was residing at the Polish College in Rome as he studied at the Pontifical Gregorian college. The then-Cardinal Karol Józef Wojtyła lived at the Polish College when in Rome and demonstrated a keen interest in its students and their studies. But Wojtyla was also fond of philosophy and found Jędraszewski's studies interesting. The two often discussed various topics and kept personal correspondence with each other when Wojtyła became pope in 1978, and this increased when Jędraszewski became a bishop.
