= Archdiocese of Poznań =

Latin Catholic archdiocese in Poland

Coordinates: 52°24′40″N 16°56′54″E

Archdiocese of Poznań Archidioecesis Metropolitae Posnaniensis Archidiecezja Metropolita Poznańska

Catholic
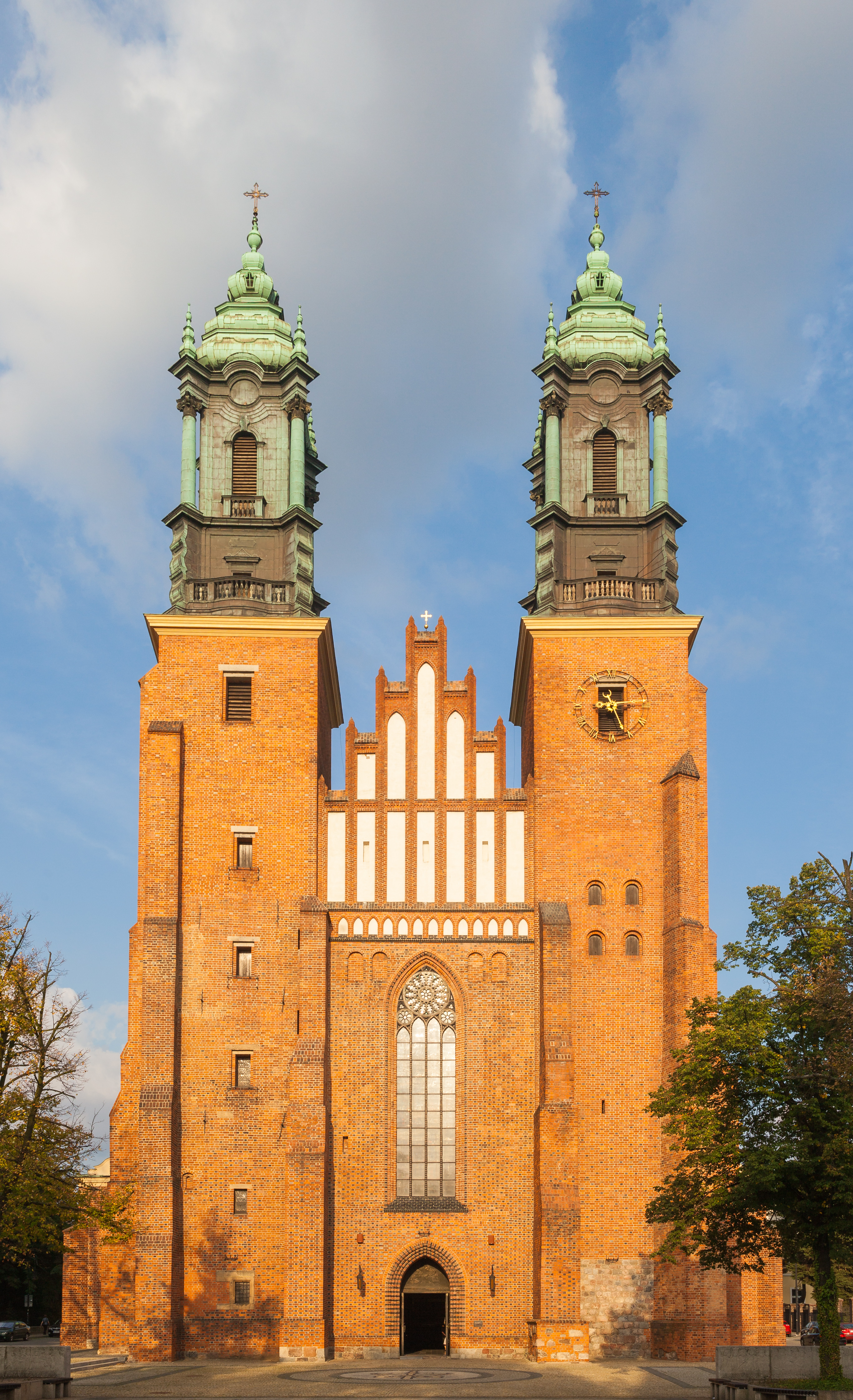
- Archcathedral Basilica of St. Peter and St. Paul in Poznań

- Coat of arms

Location
- Country: Poland

Statistics
- Area: 9,700 km^{2} (3,700 sq mi)
- Population: Total; Catholics: (as of 2019); 1,497,000; 1,477,000 (98.7%)

Information
- Denomination: Catholic Church
- Sui iuris church: Latin Church
- Rite: Roman Rite
- Cathedral: Bazylika Katedralna pw. św. Piotra i Pawła

Current leadership
- Pope: Leo XIV
- Metropolitan Archbishop: Zbigniew Zieliński
- Auxiliary Bishops: Grzegorz Balcerek; Jan Glapiak
- Bishops emeritus: Zdzisław Fortuniak; Stanisław Gądecki

Website
- Website of the Archdiocese

Map of Roman Catholic Archdiocese of Poznań

The Archdiocese of Poznań (Latin: Archidioecesis Metropolitae Posnaniensis, Polish: Archidiecezja Metropolita Poznańska) is a Latin archdiocese of the Catholic Church. It is one of 14 archdioceses located in Poland, with the seat located in Poznań.

== History ==
- 968: Established as Missionary Diocese of Poland with seat in Poznań subordinated directly to the Holy See
- 1000: Transformed to Diocese of Poznań subordinated directly to the Holy See
- 11th–12th century: Subordination of Diocese of Poznań to Metropolitan Archdiocese of Gniezno as suffragan diocese
- 16 July 1821: Raised to status of Metropolitan Archdiocese and joined with Archdiocese of Gniezno in personal union in aeque principaliter.
- 12 November 1948: dissolution of union between Archdioceses of Poznań and Gniezno as Primate of Poland Cardinal August Hlond appointed ordinary of the Archdioceses of Warsaw and Gniezno.

== Special churches ==
- Minor Basilicas:
  - Archicathedral Basilica of St. Peter and St. Paul, Poznań
  - Basilica on the Holy Mountain, Głogówko

== Suffragan dioceses ==
- Kalisz

== Seminaries ==
- Archbishop's Theological Seminary
- Society of Christ Major Seminary

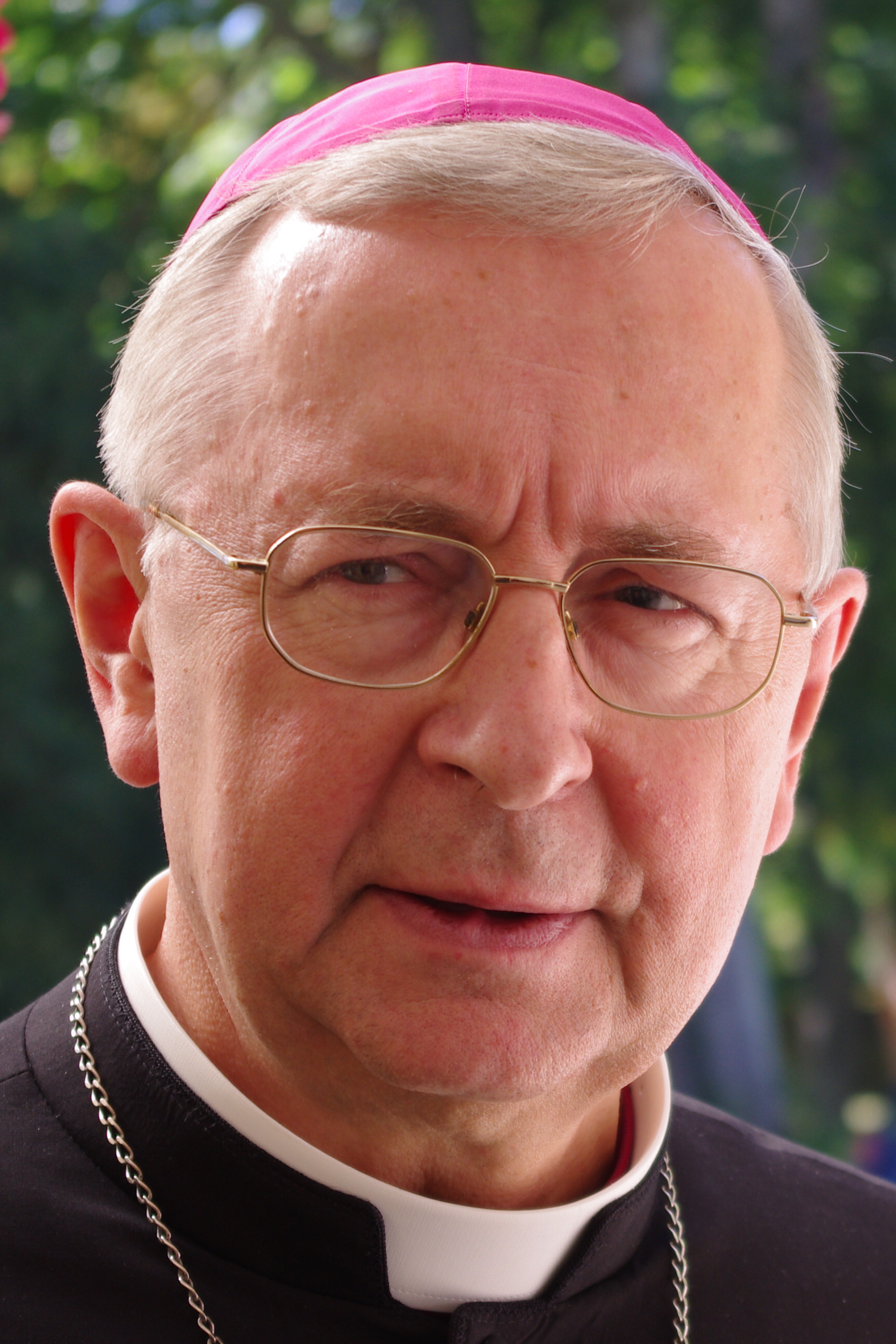
Archbishop Stanisław Gądecki

== See also ==
- Bishops of Poznań
- Catholic Church in Poland

== Sources ==
- GCatholic.org
- Catholic Hierarchy
- Diocese website
