= Marian Józef Ryx =

Polish Roman Catholic bishop

- Bishop of Sandomierz
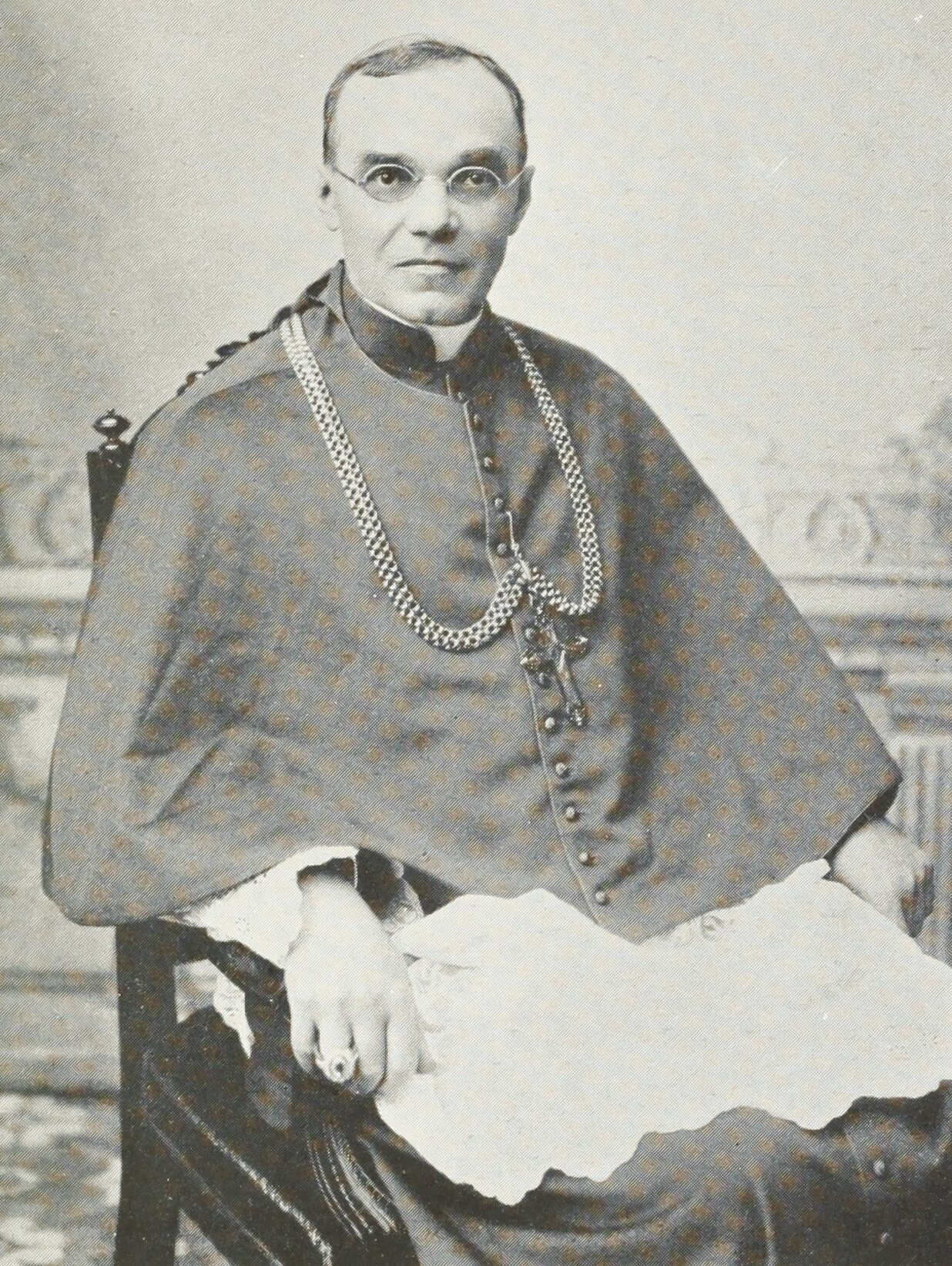
- Appointed: 7 April 1910
- Predecessor: Stefan Aleksander Zwierowicz
- Successor: Włodzimierz Jasiński

Orders
- Ordination: 1879 by Józef Michał Juszyński
- Consecration: 19 June 1910 by Wincenty Kluczyński

Personal details
- Born: 10 December 1853; Warsaw
- Died: 1 June 1930 (aged 76); Kraków

Marian Józef Ryx (10 December 1853 – 1 June 1930) was a Roman Catholic bishop of the Diocese of Sandomierz.

== Biography ==
Ryx was born in Warsaw to Kazimierz and Józefa Ryx. After completing his schooling in Radom, he began attending the seminary in Sandomierz in 1873. While studying at the seminary in St. Petersburg, he was ordained a priest by Józef Michał Juszyński in 1879; he received a magister's degree in theology in 1880. Upon being ordained, he was appointed a professor at the diocesan seminary of Sandomierz; he was later made its rector in 1895. He was made an honorary canon in 1891.

Ryx was appointed administrator of the Diocese of Sandomierz on 10 January 1908 upon the death of Stefan Aleksander Zwierowicz. He was appointed bishop of Sandomierz on 7 April 1910 by Pius X, and was consecrated on 19 June by Wincenty Kluczyński; his co-consecrators were Stefan Denisewicz and Augustyn Łosiński. He assumed control of the diocese on 3 July.

Ryx died on 1 June 1930 in Kraków.
