= Trzywdar coat of arms =

Polish–Lithuanian coat of arms

Trzywdar
- Alternative names: Tria in donum (Gift of three)
- Earliest mention: 1425
- Families: Burzyński, Butyński, Bużyński, Bylica, Jedwabiński, Kitkiewicz, Komelski, Kotelski, Łomieński, Mocarski, Moczarski, Moczulski, Modzelewski, Poletyłło, Poletyło, Rakowski, Rogienicki, Rogiński, Schill, Szwander, Tychoniewicz, Wysieński, Wyszyński

Trzywdar is a Polish coat of arms used by several szlachta families in the times of the Polish–Lithuanian Commonwealth.

== Notable bearers ==
Notable bearers of this coat of arms include:

- Adam Prosper Burzyński

== See also ==
- Polish heraldry
- Heraldry
- Coat of arms
- List of Polish nobility coats of arms

== Sources ==
- Dynastic Genealogy
- Ornatowski.com
