= Adam Prosper Burzyński =

Polish Roman Catholic bishop and missionary (1755 – 1830)

- Bishop of Sandomierz
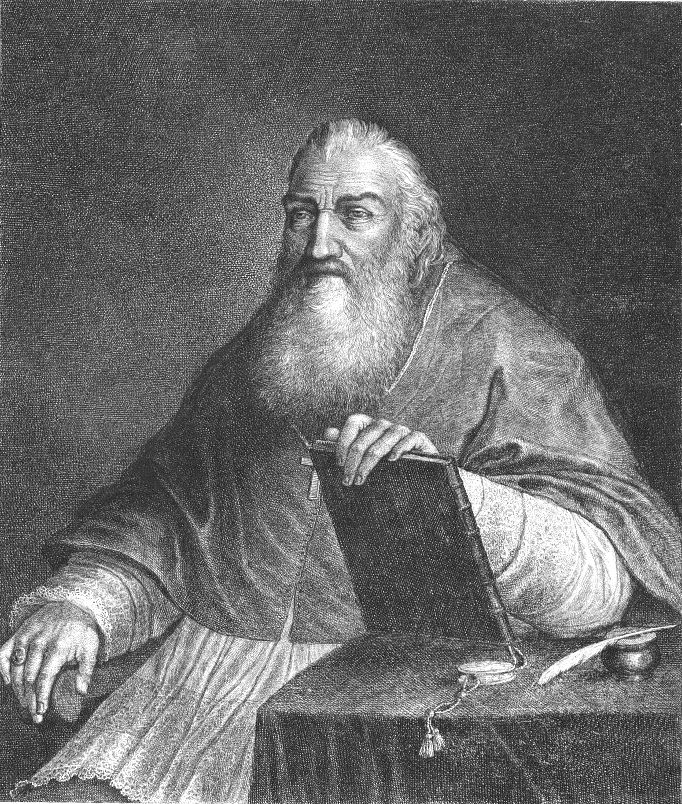
- Church: Roman Catholic
- Diocese: Sandomierz
- Appointed: 19 November 1819
- Predecessor: Szczepan Hołowczyc
- Successor: Klemens Bąkiewicz

Orders
- Ordination: 19 September 1778
- Consecration: 19 March 1820 by Szczepan Hołowczyc

Personal details
- Born: Władysław Adam Burzyński; 19 July 1755; Wojakowa, Polish-Lithuanian Commonwealth
- Died: 9 September 1830 (aged 75)

Władysław Adam Prosper Burzyński OFM de armis Trzywdar (19 July 1755 – 9 September 1830) was a Roman Catholic bishop and missionary. He was bishop of the Diocese of Sandomierz and a member of the Senate of Congress Poland from 1820 until his death.

== Life ==
Adam was born in Wojakowa on 19 July 1755 to Feliks and Anna (née Podoska) Burzyński, members of the gentry. He became a member of the Order of Friars Minor in December 1771, adopting the name "Prosper". He studied theology in the Franciscan monastery in Kraków and was ordained on 19 September 1778. He would become a missionary and travel to Egypt; during his stay in Egypt, he worked as a chaplain and interpreter for Napoleon's army. There, he would become good friends with general Józef Zajączek; following the Siege of Acre, he would travel to Syria. In 1798, he was prior for a monastery located in Cairo. Between 17 April 1802 and February 1808, he was the apostolic prefect for Upper Egypt; he would be re-appointed as apostolic prefect on 19 May 1816.

He would return to Poland in 1815 and, on the orders of General Zajączek, would stay in the country and settle at the Franciscan monastery in Sandomierz; this would end his missionary activities. He would be nominated for the Diocese of Sandomierz via decree of Alexander I on 25 September 1819. He would obtain papal approval on 20 November and was consecrated on 19 March 1820 by Szczepan Hołowczyc within the Reformed Church of Warsaw, with Adam Michał Prażmowski and Teofil Lewiński as co-consecrators. He assumed control of the diocese on 26 March 1820. During his time as bishop, he would divide the diocese into 17 deaneries; in addition, he would form a seminary and a diocesan curia.

During his time as bishop, he was also a Senator for the 1815–1831 term, having been appointed in 1819. In 1828, he was appointed a member of the Sejm Court, which tried people accused of treason. He advocated for the use of corporal punishment within these trials. On 24 May 1829, Adam was awarded the Order of Saint Stanislaus, 1st class.

Adam died on 9 September 1830; he was buried in Sandomierz Cathedral on 12 September.
