= Jan Kanty Lorek =

Polish Roman Catholic bishop

Jan Kanty Lorek CM
- Bishop of Sandomierz
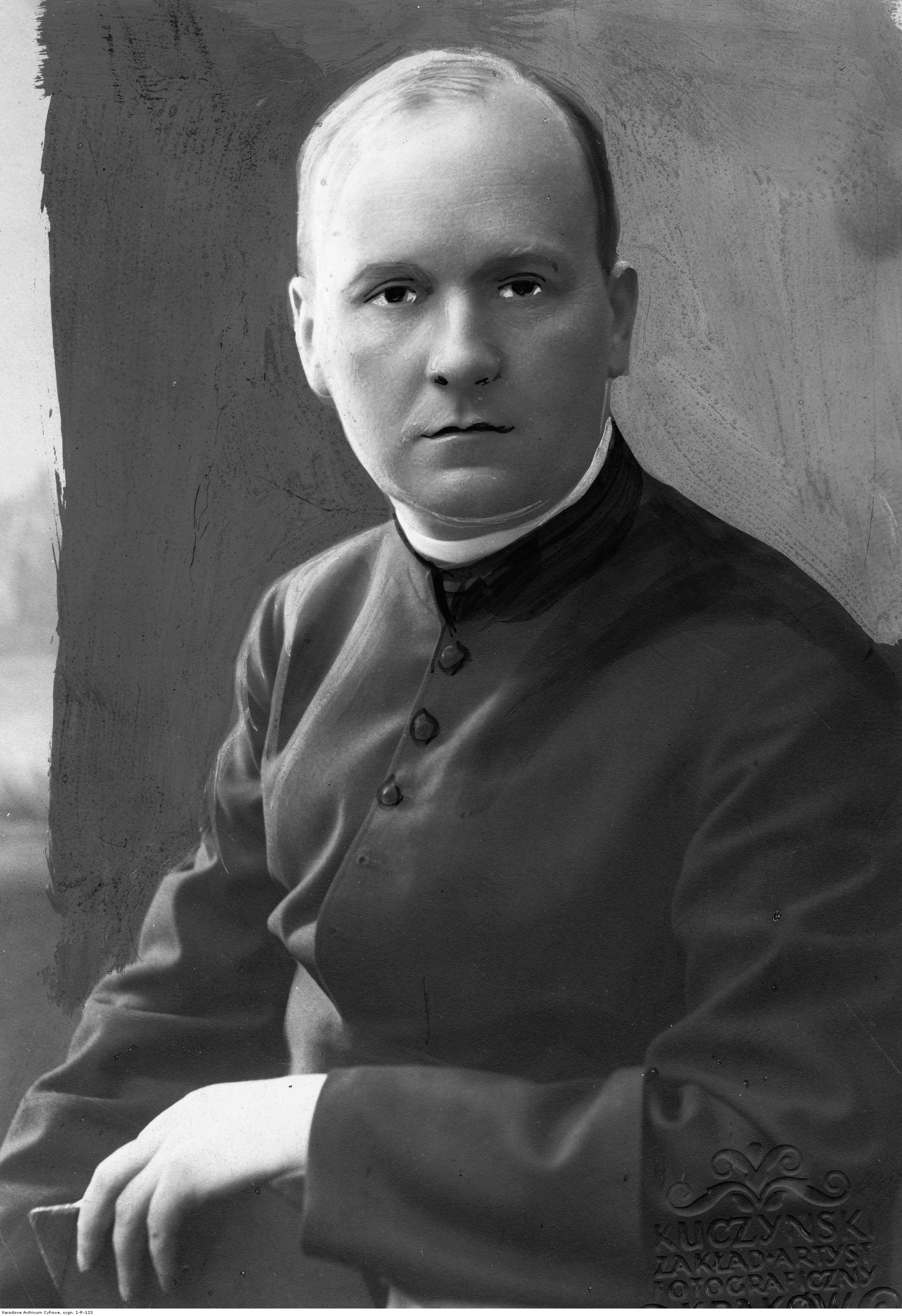
- Appointed: 12 March 1946
- Predecessor: Włodzimierz Jasiński
- Successor: Piotr Gołębiowski
- Other post(s): Apostolic administrator of Sandomierz (1936–1946); Titular bishop of Modra (1936–1946)

Orders
- Ordination: 2 July 1911 by Anatol Nowak
- Consecration: 7 June 1936 by Aleksander Kakowski

Personal details
- Born: 20 October 1886; Błażejowice
- Died: 4 January 1967 (aged 80); Sandomierz
- Motto: Evangelizare pauperibus misit me

Jan Kanty Rafał Lorek (20 October 1886 – 4 January 1967) was a Roman Catholic bishop of Sandomierz.

== Biography ==
Lorek was born in 1886 in Błażejowice. After being kicked out of school due to his Polish nationality, he entered into minor seminary for the Congregation of the Mission in Kraków in 1902; he entered into an intermediate seminary in 1905 and took his monastic vows on 27 September 1907. Afterwards, he began studying at a theological institute for the Congregation in the neighborhood of Stradom, Kraków; he was given minor orders on 25 March 1909, was ordained to the subdiaconate on 26 March 1910 and was made a deacon on 18 December 1910. He was ordained a priest on 2 July 1911 in Wawel Cathedral by Anatol Nowak, who was auxiliary bishop of Kraków.

In November 1916, Lorek was drafted into the Imperial German Army. He was originally assigned to office work in Opole, later being assigned to take care of Polish seasonal workers and prisoners of war in the Diocese of Hildesheim. In 1921, he was appointed director of the Siemaszko Institution, located in Kraków – he was awarded the Officer's Cross of the Order of Polonia Restituta on 27 November 1929 for his work in regards to the Institution.

In 1930, he was appointed prior and provost of Holy Cross Church. On 4 May 1936, he was appointed apostolic administrator for the Diocese of Sandomierz and titular bishop of Modra by Pius XI; he was consecrated on 7 July 1936 by Aleksander Kakowski, assuming control of the diocese on 9 June. On 12 March 1946, Lorek was appointed the bishop of Sandomierz.

In 1961, Lorek was appointed an assistant to the papal throne. He died on 4 January 1967 after an illness; his funeral was held on 7 January in Sandomierz. He was buried in the cathedral there.
