= Diocese of Sandomierz =

Roman Catholic diocese in Poland

Coordinates: 50.6766°N 21.7496°E

Diocese of Sandomierz Dioecesis Sandomiriensis Diecezja Sandomierska

Catholic
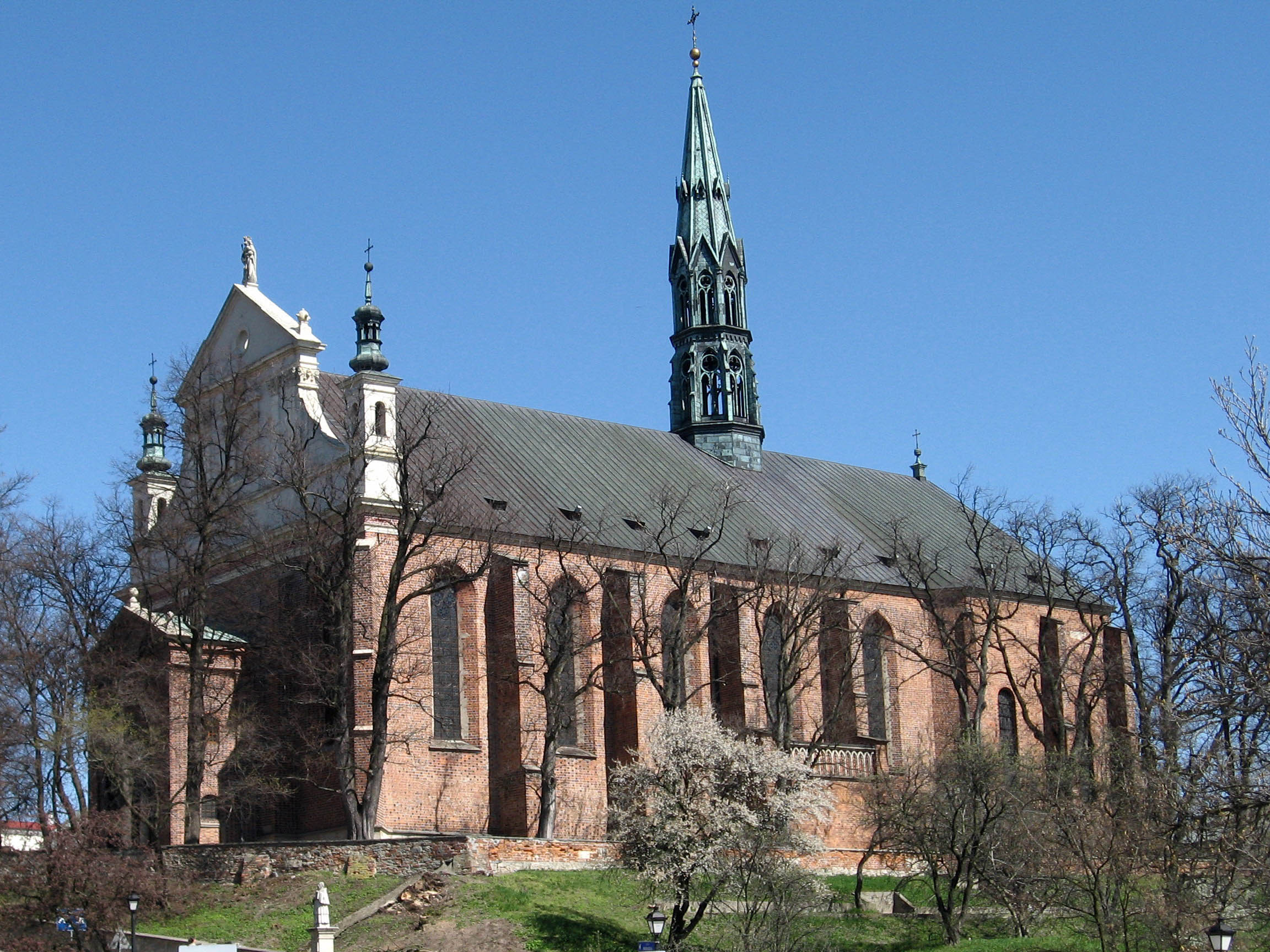
- Cathedral Basilica of the Nativity of the Blessed Virgin Mary in Sandomierz

Location
- Country: Poland
- Ecclesiastical province: Lublin
- Metropolitan: Lublin

Statistics
- Area: 7,850 km^{2} (3,030 sq mi)
- Population: Total; Catholics: (as of 2020); 683,123; 682,523 (99.9%)

Information
- Denomination: Catholic Church
- Rite: Latin Rite
- Cathedral: Bazylika Katedralna pw. Narodzenia; Najświętszej Maryi Panny (Cathedral Basilica of the Nativity of the Blessed Virgin Mary)
- Co-cathedral: Bazylika Mniejsza Konkatedra pod wezwaniem Matki Bożej Królowej Polski in Stalowa Wola (Co-Cathedral Basilica of Mary Queen of Poland)

Current leadership
- Pope: Leo XIV
- Bishop: Krzysztof Nitkiewicz
- Metropolitan Archbishop: Stanisław Budzik
- Bishops emeritus: Edward Marian Frankowski

Website
- Website of the Diocese

Map of Roman Catholic Diocese of Sandomierz

The Diocese of Sandomierz (Latin: Dioecesis Sandomiriensis) is a Latin diocese of the Catholic Church located in the city of Sandomierz in the ecclesiastical province of Lublin in Poland.

== History ==
The Diocese of Sandomierz was created on 30 June 1818 by Pope Pius VII in accordance with the Bull Ex imposita nobis. In 1981, its name was changed to the Diocese of Sandomierz-Radom but on 25 March 1992 the diocese of Radom was split off as part of a reorganization of the church in Poland by Pope John Paul II which added to Sandomierz 7 deaneries from Przemysl, two from Lublin and one from Tarnow.

== Leadership ==
- Bishops of Sandomierz (Roman rite)
  - Bishop Krzysztof Nitkiewicz (2009.06.13 – ...)
  - Bishop Andrzej Dzięga (2002.10.07 – 2009.02.21)
  - Bishop Wacław Świerzawski ( 1992.03.25 – 2002.10.07)
- Bishops of Sandomierz – Radom (Roman rite)
  - Bishop Edward Henryk Materski (1981.03.06 – 1992.03.25)
- Bishops of Sandomierz (Roman rite)
  - Bishop Piotr Gołębiowski (Apostolic Administrator 1968.02.20 – 1980.11.02)
  - Bishop Jan Kanty Lorek, C.M. (1946.03.12 – 1967.01.04)
  - Bishop Jan Kanty Lorek, C.M. (Apostolic Administrator 1936.04.26 – 1946.03.12)
  - Archbishop Włodzimierz Jasiński (1930.08.21 – 1934.11.30)
  - Bishop Marian Józef Ryx (1910.04.07 – 1930.06.03)
  - Bishop Stefan Aleksander Zwierowicz (1902.09.02 – 1908.01.04)
  - Bishop Antoni Ksawery Sotkiewicz (1883.03.15 – 1901.05.03)
  - Bishop Józef Michał Juszyński (1859.04.16 – 1880.11.24)
  - Bishop Józef Goldtmann (1844.01.25 – 1852.03.27)
  - Bishop-elect (died before consecration) Klemens Bąkiewicz (1840.08.09 – 1842.01.02)
  - Fr. Klemens Bąkiewicz (Apostolic Administrator 1831 – 1840.08.09)
  - Bishop Adam Prosper Burzyński (1819.10.05 – 1830.09.09)
  - Archbishop Szczepan Hołowczyc (1819.07.06 – 1819.12.17)
- Auxiliary bishops (Roman rite)
  - Bishop Adam Odzimek

== See also ==
- Roman Catholicism in Poland
- The Lesser Polish Way
