= Schilly =

Schilly is a surname. Notable people with the surname include:

- Dale Schilly, American soccer coach
- Katy Schilly (born 1956), American long-distance runner
- Mary Knisely (née Schilly; born 1959) American middle-distance runner

== See also ==
- Schill
