= Schily =

Schily is a surname. Notable people with the surname include:

- Jenny Schily (born 1967), German actress
- Konrad Schily (born 1937), German neurologist and politician
- Otto Schily (born 1932), German politician

== See also ==
- Schill
