= Antoni Ksawery Sotkiewicz =

Roman Catholic bishop

- Bishop of Sandomierz
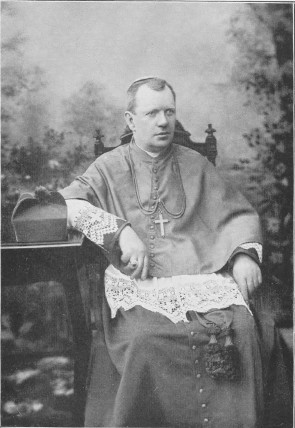
- Predecessor: Józef Michał Juszyński
- Successor: Stefan Aleksander Zwierowicz

Orders
- Ordination: 5 August 1849 by Józef Goldtmann
- Consecration: 20 May 1883 by Wincenty Teofil Popiel

Personal details
- Born: Antoni Franciszek Ksawery Sotkiewicz; 12 January 1826 Bardo, Świętokrzyskie Voivodeship, Poland
- Died: 4 May 1901 (aged 75) Sandomierz, Poland

Antoni Franciszek Ksawery Sotkiewicz (12 January 1826 – 4 May 1901) was a Roman Catholic bishop of Sandomierz and professor. Ordained a priest in 1849, he served as a professor in various institutions before being consecrated Bishop of Sandomierz in 1883.

== Biography ==
Sotkiewicz was born on 12 January 1826. He began attending the seminary in Sandomierz in 1842. He was ordained a subdeacon on 25 July 1849 and a deacon on 29 July; he was ordained a priest on 5 August by Józef Goldtmann. He obtained a doctorate of theology from the Akademia Duchowna w Warszawie in 1850. On 24 August 1853, he was appointed viceregent and a professor of the diocesian seminary in Sandomierz. He was nominated a professor of church law at the Akademia Duchowna w Warszawie on 22 December 1861 and would serve as professor until 1867. He also served as the publisher and editor of Przegląd Katolicki, a Catholic weekly newspaper.

On 15 November 1877, Sotkiewicz was appointed apostolic administrator of the Archdiocese of Warsaw. He was consecrated Bishop of Sandomierz on 20 May 1883, with Wincenty Teofil Popiel as primary consecrator and Karol Hryniewiecki & Szymon Marcin Kozłowski as co-consecrators. In 1899, he was appointed by Leo XIII as a Roman count and an assistant to the papal throne.

Sotkiewicz died during the night between 3 and 4 May 1901; he was buried in the cathedral at Sandomierz.
