= Józef Juszyński =

Polish Roman Catholic bishop (1793–1880)

- Bishop of Sandomierz
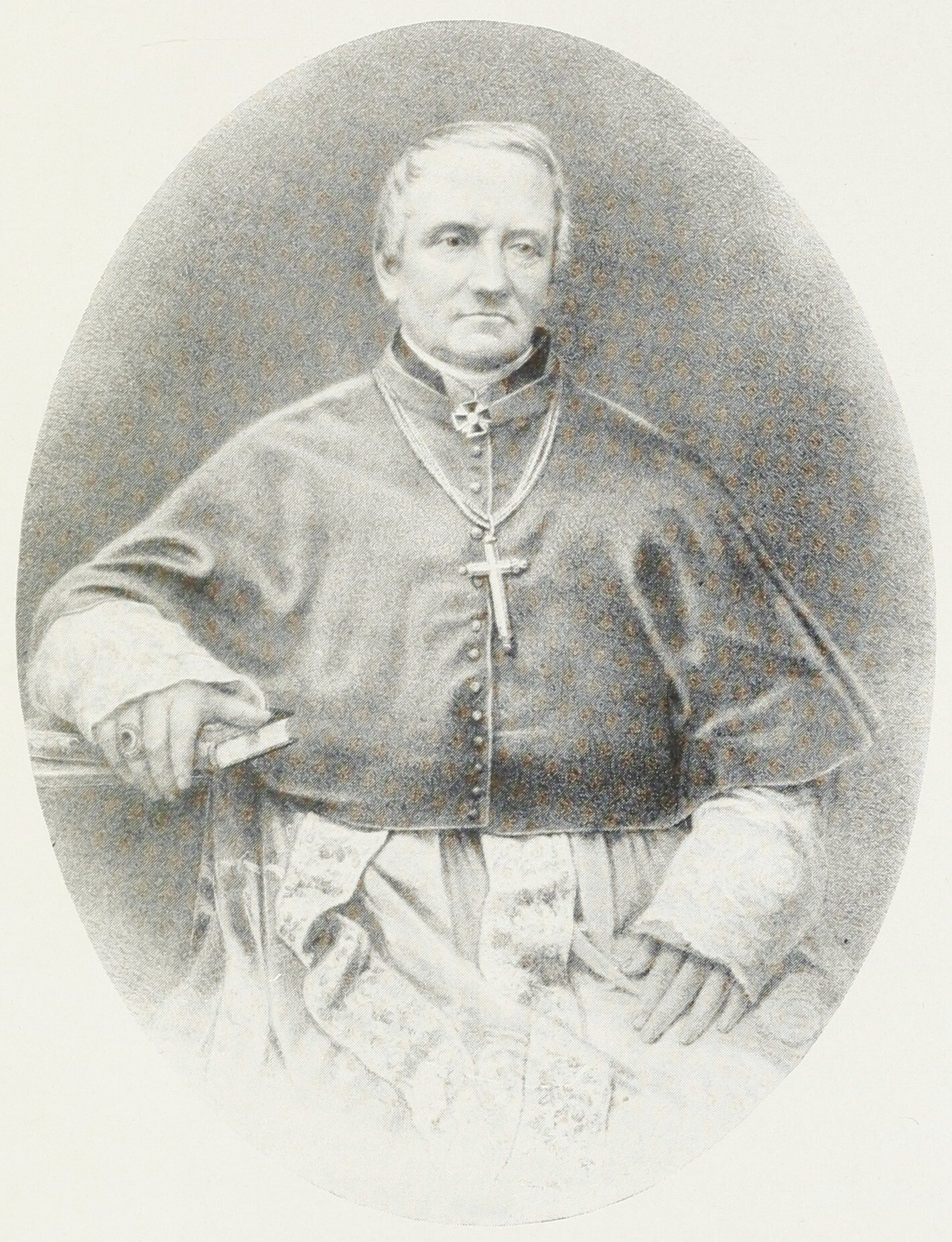
- Appointed: 16 April 1859
- Predecessor: Józef Goldtmann
- Successor: Antoni Ksawery Sotkiewicz

Orders
- Ordination: 28 October 1816 by Wojciech Górski
- Consecration: 10 July 1859 by Antoni Melchior Fijałkowski

Personal details
- Born: Józef Michał Juszyński; 18 September 1793 Bieliny, Poland
- Died: 24 November 1880 Sandomierz, Poland

Józef Michał Juszyński, Twardost coat of arms (18 September 1793 – 24 November 1880) was a bishop of the Diocese of Sandomierz from 1859 until his death in 1880.

== Biography ==
Juszyński was born in Bieliny. He attended a gymnasium in Kielce until 1809; afterwards, he entered seminary at the urging of his uncle, where he was educated for six years until 1815. As he wasn't old enough to be ordained a priest, he took up a job as a mathematics teacher at a school in Kielce. He was ordained a priest on 28 October 1816 by Wojciech Górski. After his ordination, he served as rector of a school in Kielce; he also served as parish vicar for several parishes in the Diocese of Kujawy-Kaliska. In December 1822, he was appointed as a spiritual commissar for settlement of tithes; he was appointed prefect of a departmental school in Sandomierz in June 1824, speaker of an assembly for the districts of Sandomierz and Staszów in December 1829, and rector of another departmental school in Sandomierz in 1830. In the same year, he was made an honorary canon of the cathedral chapter of Sandomierz, and was made inspector of the aforementioned departmental school in June 1833.

In 1844, Juszyński was made titular canon of the cathedral chapter of Sandomierz. After the death of Józef Goldtmann, Juszyński was nominated to serve as diocesan administrator of the Diocese of Sandomierz in 1852. He was nominated as bishop of Sandomierz on 9 October 1858; he was formally appointed by Pope Pius IX on 16 April 1859, with the consent of Tsar Alexander II. He was consecrated on 10 July 1859 at St. John's Archcathedral by Antoni Melchior Fijałkowski, assisted by Jan Dekert and Henryk Ludwik Plater. He died on 24 November 1880 and was buried in Sandomierz Cathedral.
