= Pope Pius IX and Poland =

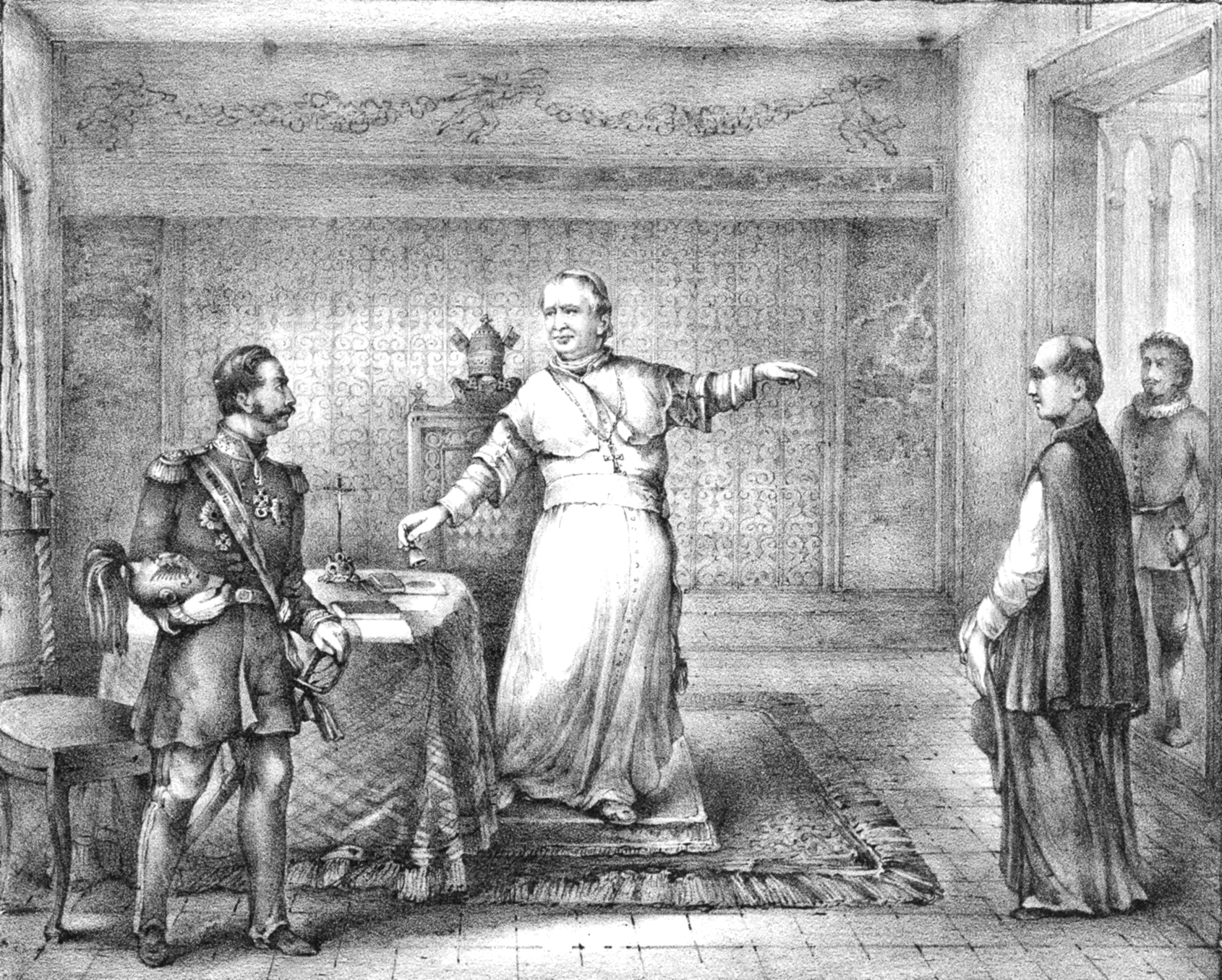
Expulsion of the Russian envoy to the Holy See Felix von Meyendorff by Pope Pius IX for insulting the Catholic faith

In the time of Pope Pius IX, Poland had long been partitioned among three neighbouring powers and no longer existed as an independent country. The Polish people lived under the rule of the Russian Empire, the Austrian Empire and Prussia.

== Russian-ruled Poles ==
The major part of the difficulties that the Pope faced with regard to the Polish people concerned those who were ruled by the Tsar in the officially separated Congress Kingdom of Poland. They faced discrimination and persecution at the hands of the government after the rebellion in 1830-1831, which enforced Russification and attempted to separate priests and people from their church.

For the sake of good relations with the government, Pius opposed the Polish nationalist movements that were often making those relations tense. On the other hand, his protests against the government's actions in its Polish provinces were so strong that they led to an intervention by the Austrian Empire, another of the powers who had taken over part of Poland, with the aim of getting the Pope to be silent on the matter.

=== Attempt to find middle ground ===
Faced with problems from revolutionary movements in his Papal States, Pope Pius first tried to position himself in the middle, strongly opposing revolutionary and violent opposition against the governing authorities, while appealing to these for greater Church freedom. After the failure of the Polish uprising in 1863, he sided with the persecuted Poles, loudly protesting their persecution, infuriating the Tsarist government to the point that all Catholic sees were closed by 1870.

=== Opposition to Polish protests ===
Pope Pius opposed Polish protests in 1860 against Russian rule in the part of Poland that fell to Russia in the partitions of Poland, protests allegedly stimulated by the anti-papal mysticism of philosopher Andrzej Towiański and influenced by Adam Mickiewicz.

On June 6, 1861, Pope Pius IX wrote to Archbishop Antoni Melchior Fijałkowski, complaining against unjust accusations by Polish nationalists and enumerating all he had done for the Polish people in the Russian Empire. The Pope repeated his position, that Poles living under Russian rule had to obey Russian laws, while the Russian government had to provide religious freedom.

=== Polish moderation and religious freedom ===
His dualistic appeals for Polish moderation and religious freedom did not appease either party. Russia felt strong on its territory, and Poles had national aspirations, for which they used Catholic churches to meet, talk and inspire emotions with patriotic songs. Continued incidents convinced the assembled cardinals in the Vatican on December 7, 1861, that the conflict was political in nature. Religion was simply a pretext for national Polish aspirations. They advised the Pope to be reluctant in his utterances.

=== Conflict inside the Church and with Russia ===
The conflict continued inside the Church and with the Russian government, which, however, established diplomatic relations with the Holy See in 1861. When the Catholic metropolitan, supported by Antoni Melchior Fijałkowski, banned patriotic Polish songs in churches, he was labelled a traitor, without gaining much support from the government. The mutual mistrust, persecution and the opening and closing of monasteries and dioceses continued in the following years. However, since the papal delegate was not allowed to have any contact with the clergy, Pope Pius IX recalled his nuncio in 1863. After the Polish uprising in the same year, Pope Pius IX on April 22, 1863, wrote to the Tsar, protesting the expropriation of Church properties, forced conversions and the jailing of the clergy.

Tsar Alexander II replied that only politically revolutionary elements were punished. On August 20, the Pope protested and ordered a prayer novena for the persecuted Church. But the persecutions worsened: 330 priests were deported, a war tax was imposed on the clergy, and 114 Catholic monasteries were closed.

=== 1864 encyclical ===
Protests by Pope Pius enraged the Tsar and his regime, and led to an Austrian intervention, urging the Pope to be silent in the interest of the Polish Catholics. The Pope abstained from public protests but issued an encyclical July 30, 1864, in which he praised the heroic fight of the Poles and enumerated destruction and persecution activities by the Russian authorities. In the aftermath, Russia closed the dioceses of Kamieniec Podolski, and banned or exiled bishops and administrators in Warsaw, Chełm and other dioceses. On November 15, 1863, the Vatican published a White Book with some one hundred documents, detailing the conflict. Russia answered with a break of the concordat on December 6, 1863. By 1870, not a single bishop from the Polish provinces of the Russian empire was left in his own diocese.

== Austrian-ruled Poles ==
Unlike the Poles in the Eastern Orthodox Russian Empire, those who belonged to the Catholic Austrian Empire were able to fully live their faith.
