= Klemens Bąkiewicz =

Polish Roman Catholic bishop-elect

- Bishop-elect of Sandomierz
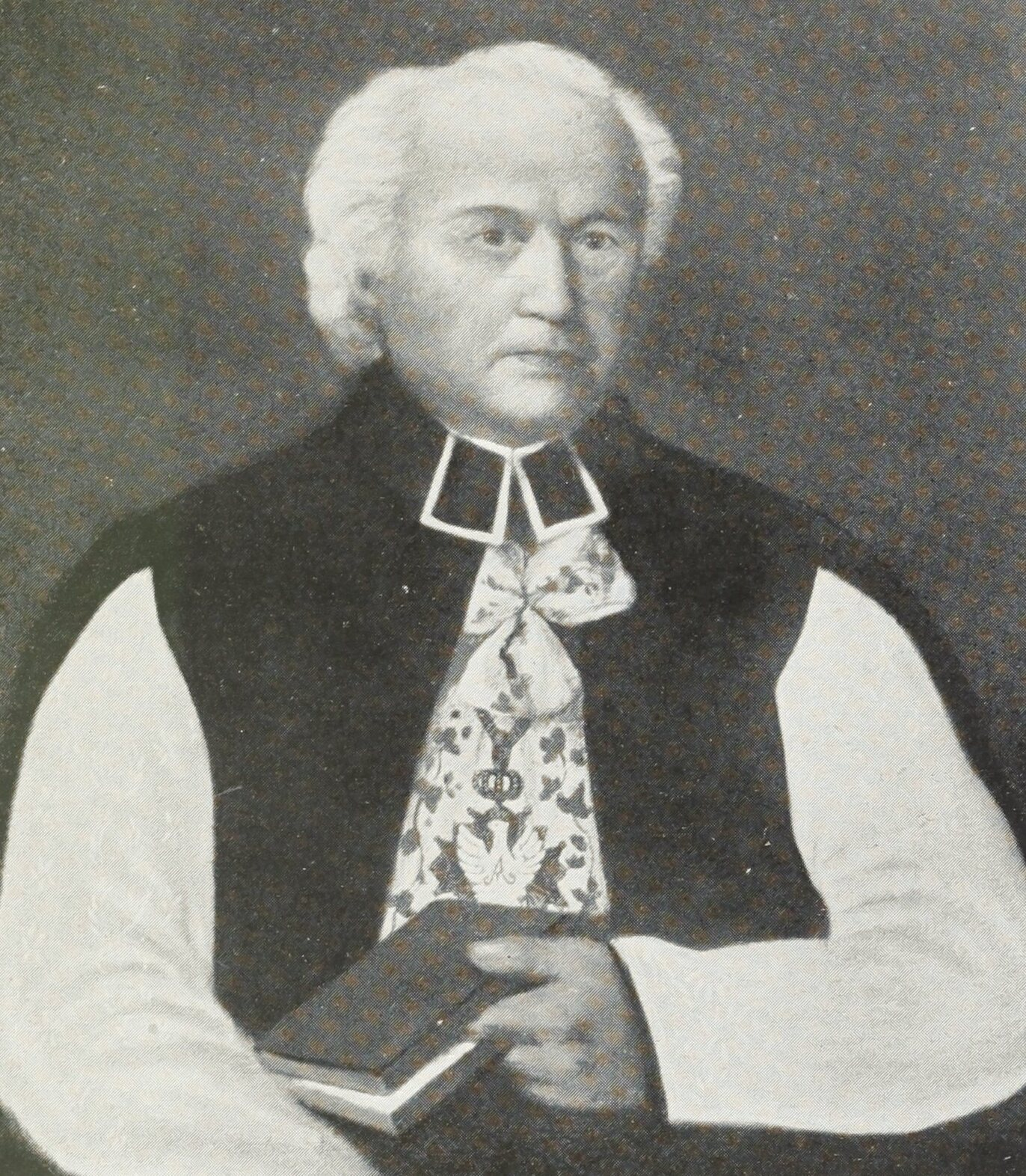
- Portrait of Bąkiewicz
- Church: Roman Catholic
- Diocese: Sandomierz
- Appointed: 9 January 1840
- Predecessor: Adam Prosper Burzyński
- Successor: Józef Goldtmann

Personal details
- Born: 1760
- Died: 2 January 1842 (aged 81–82) Sandomierz, Congress Poland

Klemens Andrzej Bąkiewicz de armis Topór (1760 – 2 January 1842) was a bishop-elect of the Diocese of Sandomierz.

Bąkiewicz was born to Paul and Agnet Bąkiewicz in 1760 and was baptized on 1 December at the church in Chmiel. Between 1786 and 1788, he served as professor of mathematics in the city of Kielce. Following the death of Adam Prosper Burzyński in 1830, Bąkiewicz would assume the role of apostolic administrator. Prior to Burzyński's death, he served as archdeacon.

Bąkiewicz was appointed as bishop on 9 January 1840; he would not be consecrated and was buried in Sandomierz Cathedral. Following his death, the tsar of Russia nominated three people to succeed him; these men were Józef Joachim Goldtmann, Thadée Kotowski and Antoine Lubienski. In a letter to Karl Nesselrode, dated 1 May 1843, Pope Gregory XVI refused to examine their bulls of institution. By 1844 - as a result of the tsar's impatience - Józef Goldtman was appointed as Bąkiewicz's successor.
