= Burzyński =

Burzyński (Polish pronunciation: [buˈʐɨɲski]; feminine: Burzyńska; plural: Burzyńscy) is a Polish surname and habitational name from the village of Burzyn in the Podlaskie Voivodeship, Poland. It derives from the noun burza ("tempest", "storm"). At the end of the 20th century, 9,583 people bore the name in Poland.

Burzyński is associated with the Trzywdar coat of arms.

Trzywdar coat of arms

== People ==
- Adam Prosper Burzyński (1755–1830), Polish bishop
- Claire Burzynski (born 1986), Australian wheelchair basketball player
- J. Bradley Burzynski (born 1955), American politician
- Joanna Burzyńska (born 1968), Polish windsurfer
- Lidia Burzyńska (born 1964), Polish politician
- Stanisław Burzyński (born 1943), Polish-American alternative cancer doctor
- Stanisław Burzyński (footballer) (1948–1991), Polish footballer
- Zbigniew Burzyński (1902–1971), Polish balloonist
