= Piotr Gołębiowski =

Polish apostolic administrator

Servant of God Piotr Gołębiowski
- Apostolic administrator of Sandomierz
- Appointed: 6 January 1968
- Predecessor: Jan Kanty Lorek
- Successor: Edward Henryk Materski
- Other posts: Auxiliary bishop of Sandomierz (1957 – 1967); Titular bishop of Panium (1957 – 1967)

Orders
- Ordination: 12 October 1924 by Paweł Kubicki
- Consecration: 28 July 1957 by Jan Kanty Lorek

Personal details
- Born: 10 June 1902 Jedlińsk
- Died: 2 November 1980 (aged 78) Nałęczów, Poland
- Motto: Maria spes nostra

Piotr Paweł Gołębiowski (10 June 1902 – 2 November 1980) was an apostolic administrator of the Diocese of Sandomierz.

== Biography ==
Gołębiowski was born in Jedlińsk. In 1919, after completing an exam, he was enrolled into the seminary in Sandomierz. After graduating, he began studying theology and philosophy at the Pontifical Gregorian University, obtaining a doctorate in philosophy in 1925 and a doctorate in theology in 1928. He was ordained on 12 October 1924 by Paweł Kubicki.

In 1929, Gołębiowski was made professor of apologetics and moral theology at the seminary in Sandomierz; he worked there as a professor until 1941. He was appointed as an auxiliary bishop of Sandomierz and titular bishop of Panium in 1957; he was consecrated on 28 July by Jan Kanty Lorek. On 6 January 1967, he was made vicar capitular of the diocese of Sandomierz; he was made apostolic administrator in 1968.

Gołębiowski was called to the 4th session of the Second Vatican Council in 1965. He died while celebrating Mass in Nałęczów in 1980 and was buried at the cathedral in Sandomierz.
