= Wacław Świerzawski =

Polish Catholic bishop and professor (1927–2017)

- Bishop of Sandomierz
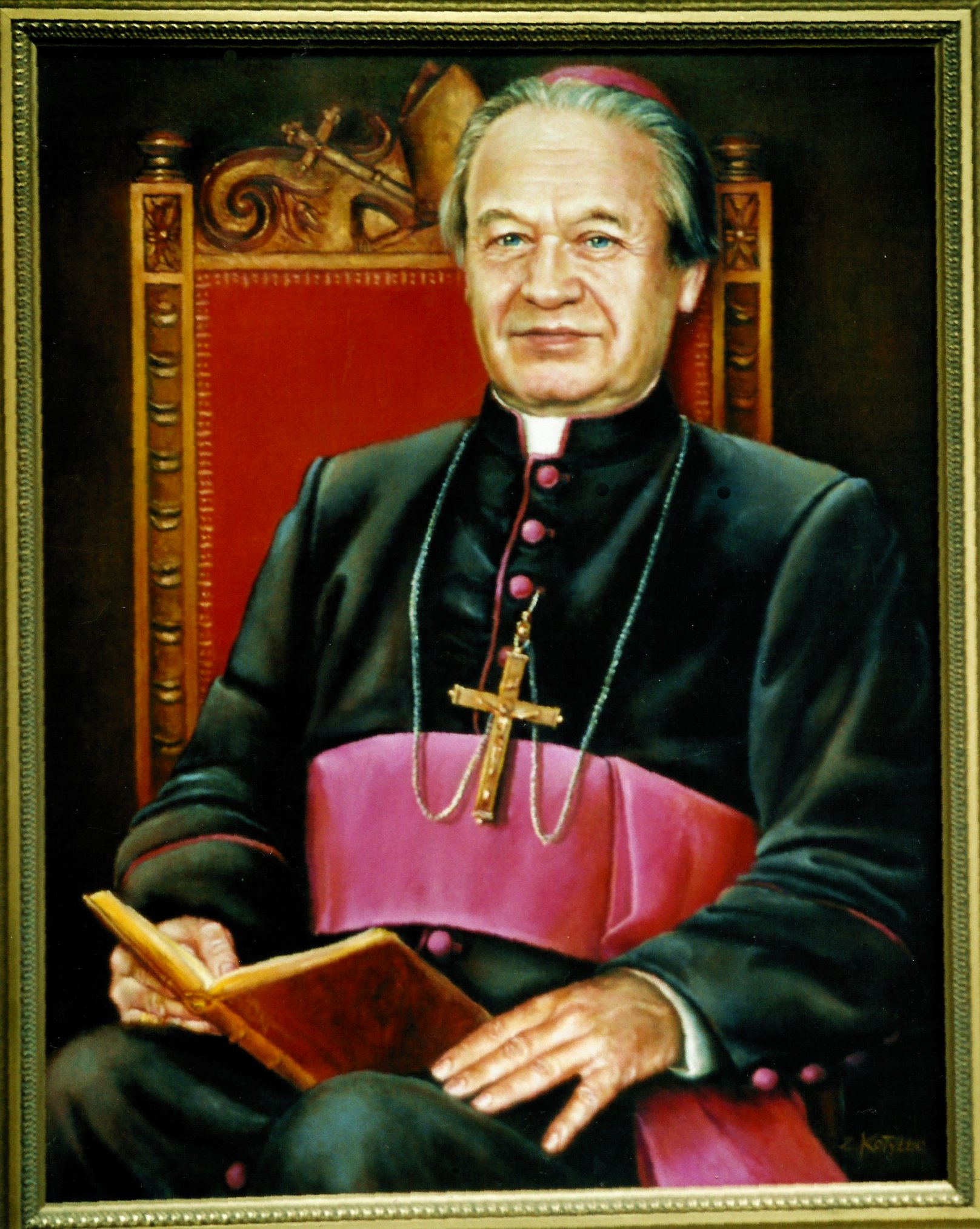
- Church: Roman Catholic
- Diocese: Sandomierz

Orders
- Ordination: 11 December 1949 by Eugeniusz Baziak
- Consecration: 28 April 1992 by Józef Kowalczyk

Personal details
- Born: May 14, 1927 Złoczów, Second Polish Republic
- Died: October 7, 2017 (aged 90) Sandomierz, Poland
- Education: Jagiellonian University; Academy of Catholic Theology in Warsaw; College of Sant'Anselmo
- Scientific career
- Workplaces: Pontifical Faculty of Theology; Metropolitan Seminary of Kraków
- Thesis: Faith and Worship in the Pauline Commentaries of Saint Thomas Aquinas (1968)

Wacław Józef Świerzawski (14 May 1927 – 7 October 2017) was a Polish Catholic bishop and professor.

Świerzawski was born in Złoczów, Poland (now Zolochiv, Ukraine). He was ordained to the priesthood on 11 December 1949; he received a master's degree in theology from Jagiellonian University and one in canon law from the Academy of Catholic Theology in Warsaw, in addition to a doctorate from the College of Sant'Anselmo in 1968. In 1981, he was appointed associate professor of the Pontifical Faculty of Theology; he was later given tenure in 1988. He would serve as Chair of Homiletics at the Metropolitan Seminary of Kraków between 1975 and 1986.

He served as bishop of the Diocese of Sandomierz from 28 April 1992 to October 2002 and died on 7 October 2017; his funeral was held on 15 and 16 October. During his life, Świerzawski authored 64 books and over 1,300 articles regarding theology.
