= Krzysztof Nitkiewicz =

Polish Roman Catholic bishop

- Bishop of Sandomierz
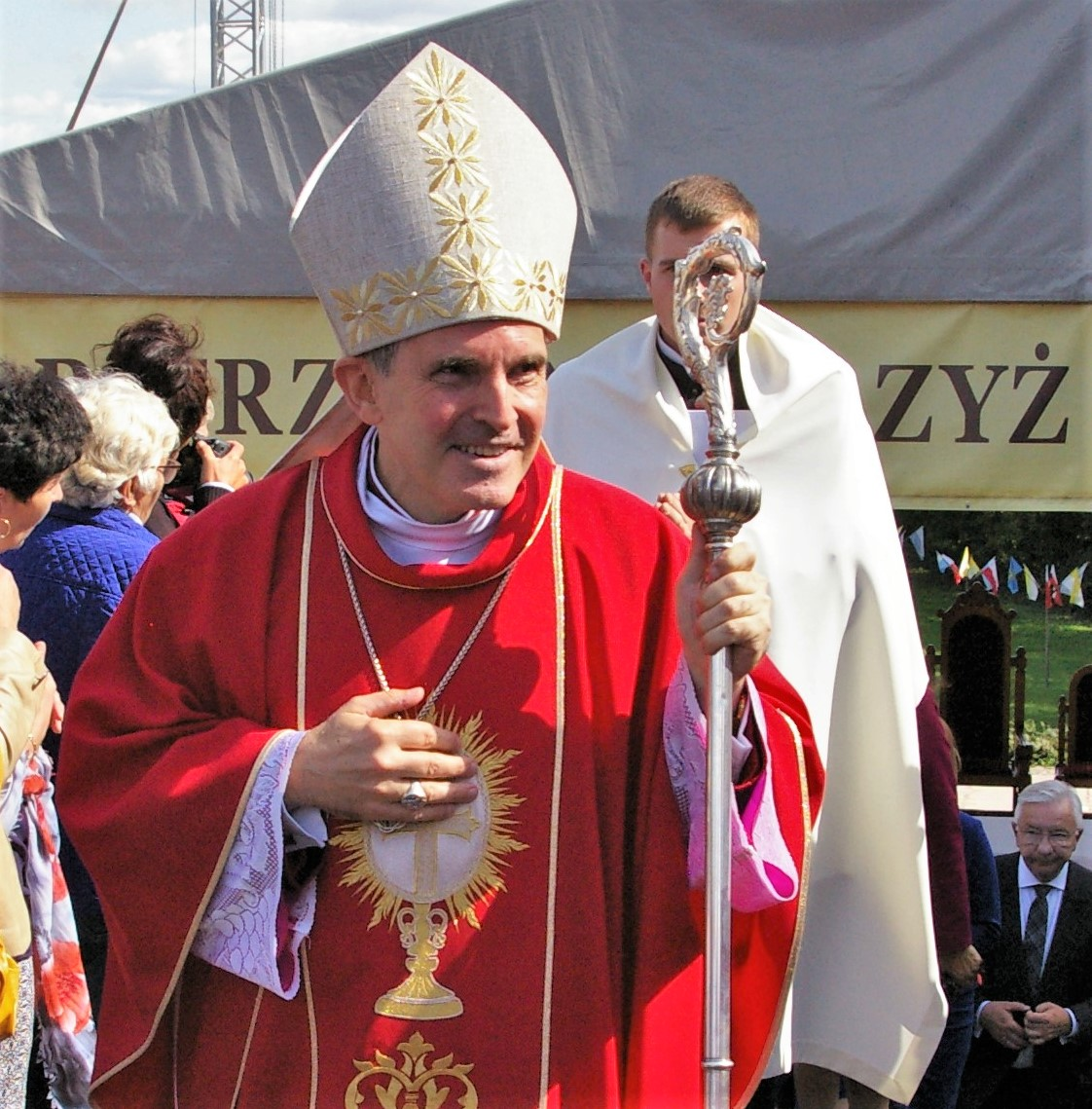
- Diocese: Roman Catholic Diocese of Sandomierz
- Appointed: 13 April 2009
- Predecessor: Andrzej Dzięga

Orders
- Ordination: 19 June 1985 by Edward Kiesel
- Consecration: 4 July 2009 by Józef Kowalczyk

Personal details
- Born: 17 July 1960 (age 66) Białystok
- Education: John Paul II Catholic University of Lublin; Pontifical Gregorian University

Krzysztof Nitkiewicz (born 17 July 1960) is the incumbent Roman Catholic bishop of Sandomierz.

== Biography ==
Nitkiewicz was born in 1960 in Białystok; after completing his secondary education, he began attending the archdiocesan seminary in Białystok in 1979. During his time there, he served for a brief time at a chaplain's unit based in Bartoszyce until it was dissolved in March 1980. He was ordained on 19 June 1985 by Edward Kiesel, the apostolic administrator of Białystok. In 1986, he began studying canon law at the Pontifical Gregorian University; he received a doctorate in 1991. After this, he taught canon law at the seminary in Białystok.

In 1992, Nitkiewicz was appointed to the Dicastery for the Eastern Churches; he was later appointed as its under-secretary on 15 March 2002. In 2006, he was made a Chaplain of His Holiness. Nitkiewicz was appointed Bishop of Sandomierz by Pope Benedict XVI on 13 June 2009; he was consecrated on 4 July 2009 by Józef Kowalczyk, Archbishop of Gniezno.
