= Drizipara =

Ancient city in the Roman province of Europa

Drizipara (Greek: Δριζιπάρα), also known as Druzipara, Drousipara, Drusipara; now Büyükkarıştıran/Büyükkarıştıran' in Lüleburgaz district, was a city and a residential episcopal see in the Roman province of Europa in the civil diocese of Thrace. It is now a titular see of the Catholic Church.

== History of the town ==
The Greeks called the city Drizipera, Drousipara/Drusipara, Drizeparos and Drixiparos. By the 9th century, it was called Mesene.

The city was situated, as mentioned by Ptolemy on the part of the Via Egnatia leading from Adrianople to Byzantium. It contained a basilica dedicated to a Saint Alexander who suffered martyrdom there under Maximian. In 591, the Khagan of the Avars captured the city. He burned the church and destroyed the relics of the martyr. in looting their silver casing.

Sultan Murad I conquered the city in the 14th century. The city was described in 1432 Bertrandon of Broquière and in 1453 the wife of Grand Duke Loukas Notaras died there,

In the 16th century Sultan Bajazet II rebuilt a new city, Büyük Karistiran, a few kilometers to the west, which quickly supplanted Drizipara which dwindled.

The site is today occupied by a village called Misinli close to the town of Büyükkarıştıran.

== Church history ==
Drusipara, a titular see in Thracia Prima. Nothing is known of the ancient history of this town, which, was situated on the route from Adrianople to Byzantium. It may be that it was founded in the 4th century as the centre of a bishopric, which by the 7th century was an autocephalous archdiocese. At first it was a suffragan of Heraclia but in the eighth and ninth centuries became an independent archbishopric, which was only suppressed during the Bulgarian invasions.

The Notitia Episcopatuum of Byzantine Emperior Leo VI the Wise (886-912) ranks it 20th among the 49 sees listed; and it appears as 23rd of 51 in that of John I Tzimiskes (925–976), 14th of 44 in that of Michael VIII Palaiologos (1223–1282), 12th of 26 in that of Andronicus III (1328–1341). There is no mention of it in a later list, probably of the 16th century, possibly because of having fallen victim to the Turkish conquests. In all these Notitiae Episcopatuum the name of the see appears as Mesene (Misini in modern Greek pronunciation).

The names of only two of the diocesan bishops are recorded: Theodore, who attended the Second Council of Constantinople in 553AD, and Cyriacus, who attended the Second Council of Nicaea in 787.

From the late 14th century the title has been given to Latin bishops, who initially were not considered to have archiepiscopal rank, but now are. The see was referred to at first as Missine. This became Mysine in the 16th century. The name Drusipara came into use in the 18th century, but was changed to Drizipara in 1930.

=== Known bishops ===
- Titular Archbishop: Archbishop Theotonius Amal Ganguly, C.S.C. (1965.07.06 – 1967.11.23)
- Titular Archbishop: Archbishop Włodzimierz Jasiński (1946.12.12 – 1965.04.17)
- Titular Bishop: Bishop Alberto Odorico Timmer (翟宇仁), O.F.M. (1901.07.20 – 1943.04.26)
- Titular Bishop: Bishop Maxime Decelles (1893.01.14 – 1901.05.24)
- Titular Bishop: Bishop Bernard Collier, O.S.B. (1863.09.15 – 1890.11.21)
- Titular Bishop: Bishop-elect José Antonio de la Peña y Navarro (1862.04.07 – 1863.03.19)
- Titular Bishop: Bishop Clément Bonnand, M.E.P. (1831.08.19 – 1861.03.21)
- Titular Bishop: Bishop Gabrijel Palković, O.S.B.M. (1752.08.04 – 1759.02.25)
- Cyriacus, fl 787
- Theodore fl553.
