= Błażejowice, Silesian Voivodeship =

Błażejowice
- Village
- Location within Poland
- Coordinates: 50°29′N 18°35′E
- Country: Poland
- Voivodeship: Silesian
- County: Gliwice
- Gmina: Wielowieś

Population
  - Total: 305

Błażejowice [bwaʐɛjɔˈvit͡sɛ] is a village in the administrative district of Gmina Wielowieś, within Gliwice County, Silesian Voivodeship, in southern Poland.

== Etymology ==
The name of the village comes from the Polish male name Błażej. It was noted under its Polish name Błażejowice in the Geographical Dictionary of the Kingdom of Poland from 1880 and in Konstanty Damrot's work on the origins of place names in Silesia from 1896.

== Notable people ==
- Jan Kanty Lorek (1886–1967), Polish Roman Catholic bishop
