= Stefan Aleksander Zwierowicz =

Roman Catholic bishop and professor

- Bishop of Sandomierz
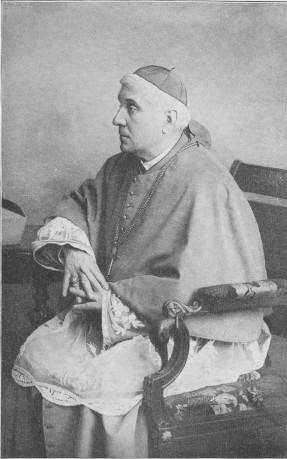
- Appointed: 16 April 1897
- Predecessor: Antoni Ksawery Sotkiewicz
- Successor: Marian Józef Ryx
- Previous post: Bishop of Vilnius (1897 – 1902)

Orders
- Ordination: 2 December 1869
- Consecration: 16 November 1897 by Mečislovas Leonardas Paliulionis

Personal details
- Born: 26 December 1842 Wyrozęby, Poland
- Died: 3 January 1908 (aged 65) Sandomierz, Poland

Stefan Aleksander Zwierowicz (26 December 1842 – 3 January 1908) was a Roman Catholic bishop of the Diocese of Sandomierz and of the Diocese of Vilnius.

== Biography ==
Zwierowicz was born in Wyrozęby. He attended high school in Białystok, from which he graduated in 1861. After this, he attended the seminary in Vilnius, graduating in 1864. He then began to attend the seminary in St. Petersburg, where he was ordained in 1869. He completed his studies in 1870, attaining a magister degree in theology.

In April the same year, Zwierowicz was appointed a professor at the seminary in Vilnius, where he taught the history of the Catholic Church as well as theology and exegesis. He also served as rector of a local high school between 1877 and 1878, and would later become rector of the seminary between 1882 and 1883.

In 1887, Zwierowicz was made canon of the cathedral in Vilnius; he was made administrator of the Diocese in Vilnius in 1897, succeeding Ludwik Zdanowicz. In April that year, he was appointed Bishop of Vilnius; he was consecrated in November in St. Petersburg by Mečislovas Leonardas Paliulionis, Bishop of Samogitia. In 1902, he was exiled to Tver for issuing a letter to the clergy of the Diocese of Vilnius that condemned the Russification of schools within the diocese. In September, he was appointed by Pope Leo XIII as Bishop of Sandomierz. He assumed control of the diocese on 30 December.

Zwierowicz died in 1908 and was buried at the cathedral in Sandomierz.
