= Szczepan Hołowczyc =

Polish Roman Catholic bishop

- Primate of Poland; Archbishop of Warsaw
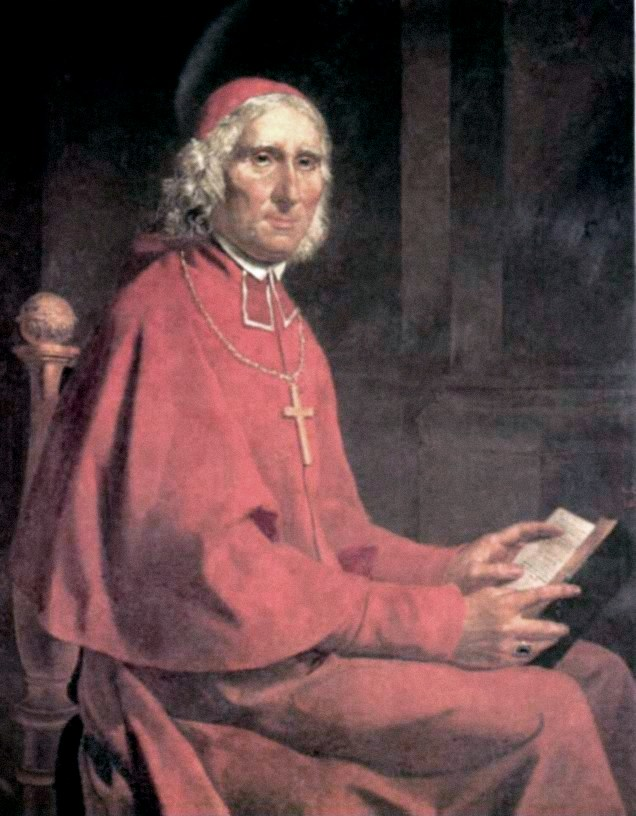
- Painting of Hołowczyc by Antoni Brodowski
- Appointed: 17 December 1819
- Predecessor: Franciszek Skarbek-Malczewski
- Successor: Wojciech Skarszewski
- Previous post(s): Bishop of Sandomierz (1819–1820)

Orders
- Ordination: 1772
- Consecration: 6 June 1819 by Adam Michał Prażmowski

Personal details
- Born: 19 August 1741
- Died: 27 August 1823 (aged 82); Warsaw, Congress Poland

Szczepan Hołowczyc (Note: Also named as Stefan Hołowczyc.) de armis Pierzchała (19 August 1741–27 August 1823) was a Roman Catholic archbishop of Warsaw from 1818 until his death in 1823 and a senator of Congress Poland. He previously served as bishop of Sandomierz from 1819 to 1820.

Hołowczyc was the son of Basil and Mary Hołowczyc (née Ostaszkiewicz). He studied at a Jesuit seminary in Vilnius from 1771; after his ordination in 1772, he continued his studies in Rome. He was then appointed parish priest at Kutno in 1773. In 1774, he departed for Rome to study canon law, eventually visiting Germany. After returning to Poland in 1776, he was appointed as secretary for Michał Jerzy Poniatowski, who appointed him to the rectory in Osiek. That same year, Hołowczyc went to Kraków, where he passed law examinations at Kraków University and was made a doctor of both laws.

In 1781, Hołowczyc was appointed canon of the cathedral chapter at Warsaw; he was then appointed to the rectory at Wrocimowice in 1783, and was later appointed canon of the cathedral chapter of the Archdiocese of Kraków in 1785. In 1789, he was appointed dean and prelate of the cathedral chapter of the Diocese of Kielce. In 1818, he was appointed a senator of Congress Poland; the following year, on 29 March 1819, he was appointed bishop of the Diocese of Sandomierz. He was consecrated on 6 June 1819 by Adam Michał Prażmowski. On 24 April 1819, he was appointed vicar capitular of the Archdiocese of Warsaw.

On 17 December 1819, Hołowczyc was appointed archbishop of Warsaw; he assumed canonical control of the Archdiocese on 19 December of the same year. He died on 27 August 1823; his funeral was held on 5 September and he was buried at St. John's Archcathedral.
