= Antoni Melchior Fijałkowski =

Archbishop of Warsaw (1778–1861)

- Archbishop of Warsaw
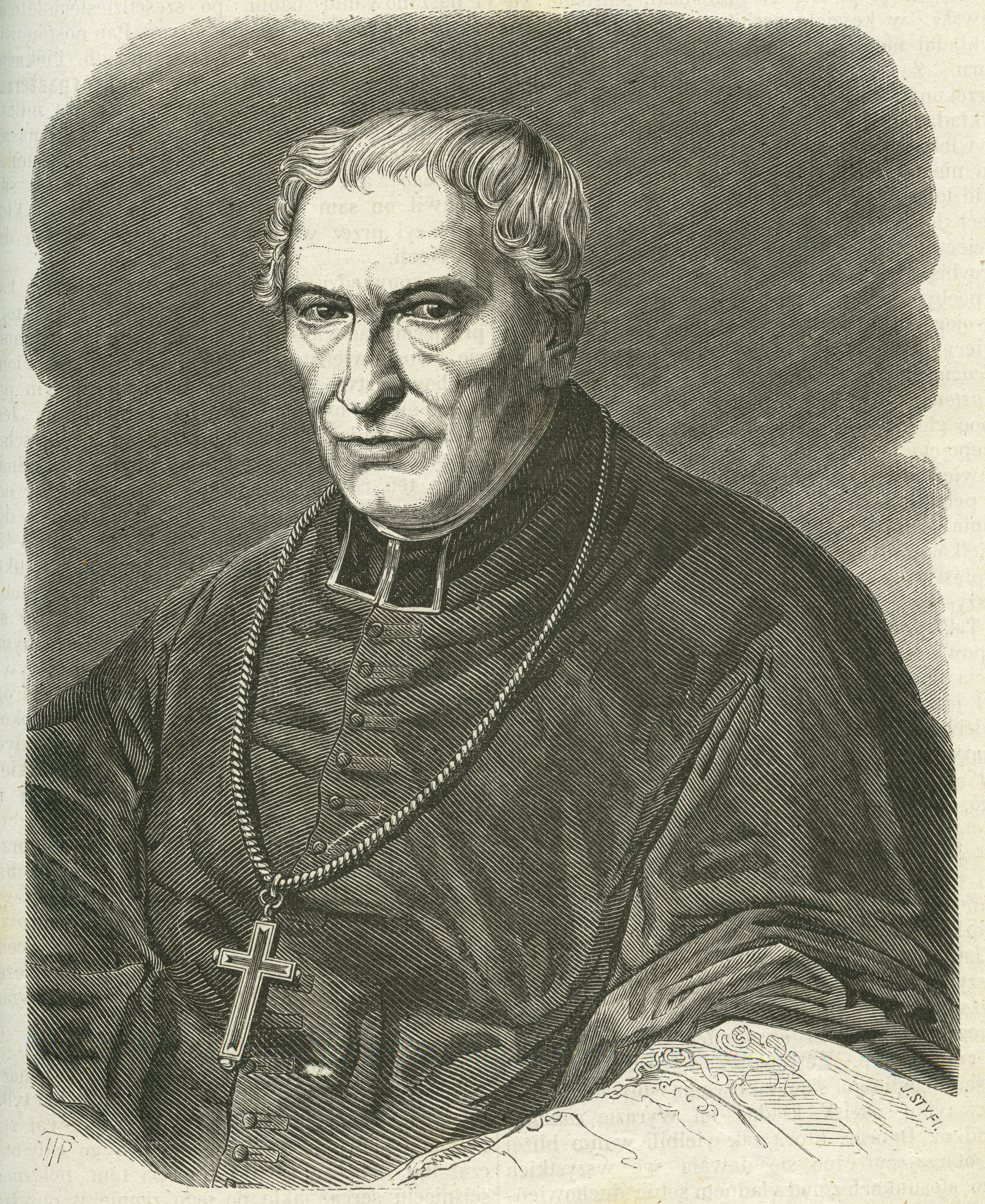
- Appointed: 18 October 1856
- Previous posts: Auxiliary bishop of Płock (1842 – 1856); Titular bishop of Hermopolis (1842–1856)

Orders
- Ordination: 1800
- Consecration: 15 May 1842 by Franciszek Pawłowski

Personal details
- Born: 3 January 1778 Pszczew
- Died: 5 October 1861 (aged 83) Warsaw

Antoni Melchior Optat Fijałkowski (3 January 1778 – 5 October 1861) was a Catholic archbishop of the Archdiocese of Warsaw from 1856 to 1861. He previously served as auxiliary bishop of the Diocese of Płock and titular bishop of Hermopolis from 1842 to 1856.

== Biography ==
Fijałkowski was born in Pszczew to Stefan and Beata Fijałkowski. He was educated at a school in Poznań before entering the seminary in Gniezno. He was ordained as a priest of the Diocese of Kujawy-Kaliska in 1800. In 1811, at the age of 33, he was made a canon of the cathedral chapter of the Diocese. In 1818, he was appointed as cantor for the collegiate church in Wolbórz. After the church was dissolved, he was made parish vicar at Przedecz. Between 1824 and 1827, he served as a "general official" on behalf of Józef Szczepan Koźmian. He founded St. Anthony Hospital in Włocławek in 1830, to which he later bequeathed a sum of 4,000 złoty.

On 28 July 1840, Fijałkowski was nominated as auxiliary bishop of the Diocese of Płock. He was preconized on 27 January 1842 as auxiliary bishop of Płock and titular bishop of Hermopolis. Fijałkowski was consecrated at Włocławek Cathedral on 15 May 1842 by Franciszek Pawłowski, assisted by Walenty Maciej Tomaszewski and Józef Goldtmann. He was awarded the Order of Saint Anna, 1st class, in May 1855. On 18 October 1856, Fijałkowski was appointed by Pope Pius IX as archbishop of the Archdiocese of Warsaw; he received his pallium from Tadeusz Łubieński at St. John's Archcathedral on 11 January 1857. He died on 5 October 1861 in Warsaw, and was buried on 11 October of the same year in St. John's Archcathedral.

== See also ==
- List of Poles

Religious titles
Preceded by Stanisław Kostka Choromański	Archbishop of Warsaw; 1856–1861	Succeeded by Zygmunt Szczęsny Feliński
