= Modra (Bithynia) =

Town in ancient Bithynia

Coordinates: 40°29′20″N 31°08′37″E

Modra (Ancient Greek: τὰ Μόδρα) was a town of ancient Bithynia. According to Strabo, the town was situated in Phrygia Epictetus, at the sources of the river Gallus. This river flows down from the northern slope of the Bithynian Olympus, forming the boundary between Phrygia and Bithynia, Strabo must be mistaken, and Modra probably belonged to the southwest of Bithynia. It became the seat of a bishop; no longer a residential see, it remains a titular see of the Roman Catholic Church. The district about Modra was called Modrene.

Its site is located near Mudurnu in Asiatic Turkey.
