= Wojakowa =

- Village
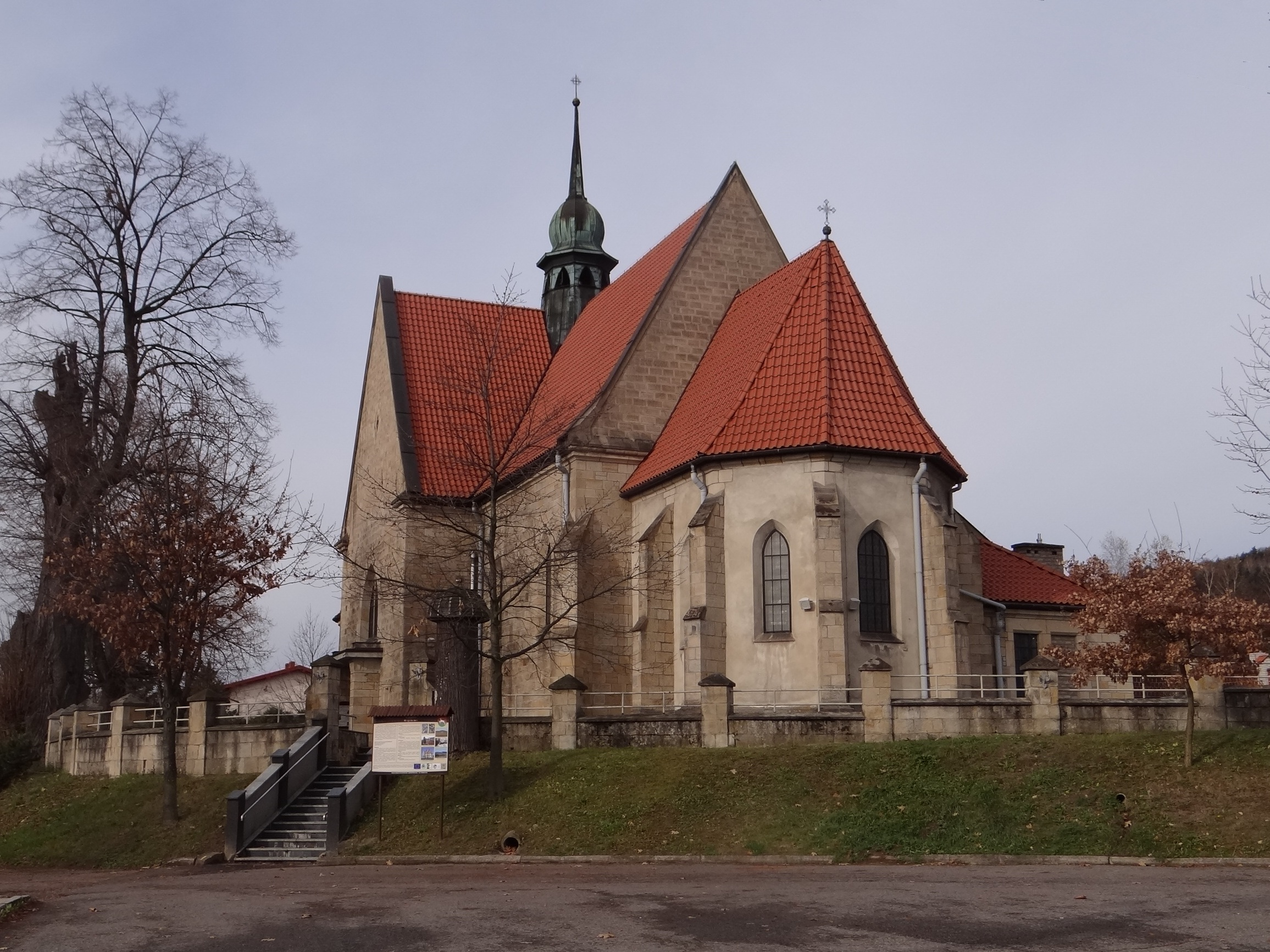
- Catholic church

- Location within Poland
- Coordinates: 49°49′N 20°34′E
- Country: Poland
- Voivodeship: Lesser Poland
- County: Brzesko
- Gmina: Iwkowa
- Population: 1,063

Wojakowa [vɔjaˈkɔva] is a village in the administrative district of Gmina Iwkowa, within Brzesko County, Lesser Poland Voivodeship, in southern Poland.
