= Roginsky =

Roginsky or Roginski (Russian: Рогинский), feminine: Roginskaya is surname of Polish origin (Polish: Rogiński feminine: Rogińska. It may refer to:

- Arseny Roginsky, Russian historian, Soviet dissident
- Boris Roginsky, Russian philosopher and literary critic
- Julie Roginsky, Russian-born American political strategist and commentator
- M. Rogiński, alias of Marian Zyndram-Kościałkowski, Polish indepencence activist and politician
- Mikhail Roginsky, Russian painter
- Szymon Rogiński, Polish photographer
