= Józef Goldtmann =

Polish Roman Catholic bishop

- Bishop of Sandomierz
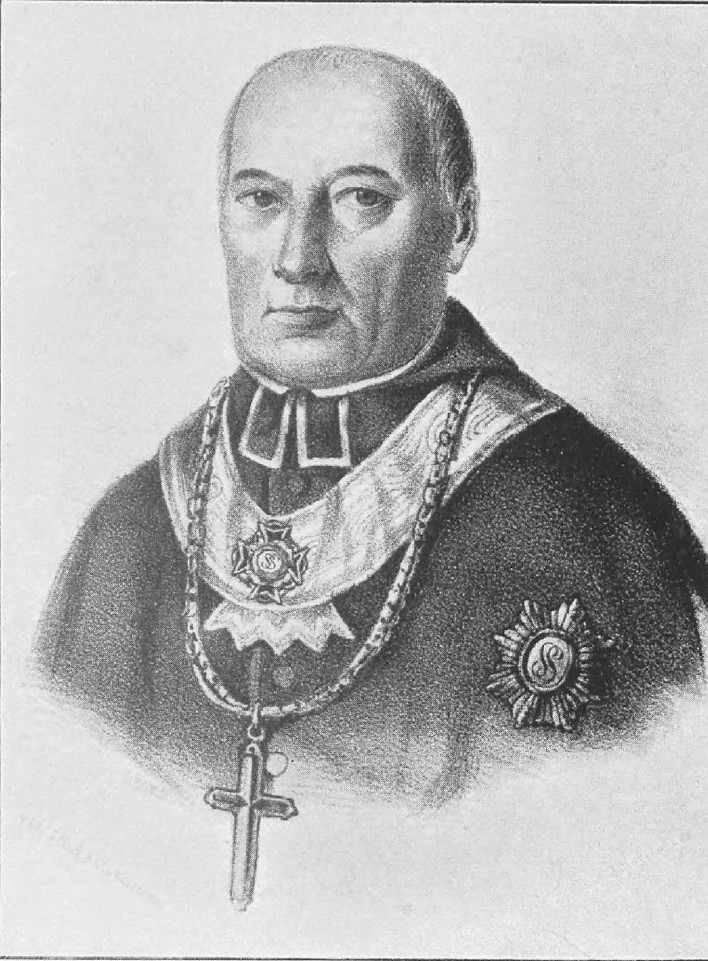
- Appointed: 22 January 1844
- Predecessor: Klemens Bąkiewicz
- Successor: Józef Michał Juszyński
- Previous post(s): Auxiliary bishop of Włocławek (1838 – 1844); Titular bishop of Carystus (1838 – 1844)

Orders
- Ordination: 1806
- Consecration: September 15, 1838

Personal details
- Born: 21 March 1782; Wejherowo, Poland
- Died: 22 March 1853 (aged 71)

Józef Joachim Goldtmann (21 March 1782 – 22 March 1853) was a Roman Catholic bishop of the Diocese of Sandomierz.

Goldtmann was born on 21 March 1782 to Charles and Francisca Goldtmann in Wejherowo in West Prussia; he would be baptized the same day. In 1804, Goldtmann entered the seminary in Łowicz. He would be ordained a priest in 1806. In addition, he would be appointed canon for the cathedral of the Diocese of Włocławek in 1824 and officiant of the diocese in 1825.

On 15 September 1838, Goldtmann was consecrated as auxiliary bishop of Włocławek and titular bishop of Carystus; he would begin his term on 17 September. He would be transferred to the Diocese of Sandomierz in 1844.

In 1848, Goldtmann was awarded the Order of Saint Anna, 1st Class.
