= Włodzimierz Jasiński =

Polish Roman Catholic bishop (1873 – 1965)

- Titular archbishop of Drizipara
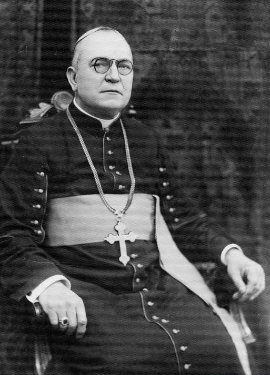
- Installed: 20 January 1946
- Term ended: 17 April 1965
- Other posts: Bishop of Łódź (1934 – 1946); Bishop of Sandomierz (1930 – 1934)

Orders
- Ordination: 13 October 1895 by Aleksander Kazimierz Bereśniewicz
- Consecration: 5 October 1930 by Aleksander Kakowski

Personal details
- Born: 12 June 1873 Włocławek
- Died: 17 April 1965 (aged 91) Tuchów
- Motto: Recta recte

Włodzimierz Bronisław Jasiński (12 June 1873 – 17 April 1965) was a bishop of the Diocese of Łódź.

== Biography ==
Jasiński was born in Włocławek to Władysław and Maria Jasiński (née Wiśniewska). After completing secondary school, he attended the diocesan seminary there, where he studied theology and philosophy. He was ordained a priest on 13 October 1895 by Aleksander Kazimierz Bereśniewicz, bishop of Włocławek. In 1913, he was recognized as a candidate for a doctorate in theology at the theological academy at St. Petersburg, although the outbreak of World War I stopped his studies there.

Jasiński was made an honorary canon of the chapter of canons at the Basilica of St. Joseph in the Diocese of Kalisz on 15 July 1915; he was later made a general canon in 1919 and was made a Chaplain of His Holiness in 1921. In 1926, he became rector of the seminary in Łódź. On 21 August 1930, Jasiński was appointed by Pius XI as Bishop of Sandomierz; he was consecrated on 5 October by Aleksander Kakowski and was installed on 9 October.

On 30 November 1934, he was transferred to the Diocese of Łódź; he was installed on 27 January 1935. On 20 January 1946, Pius XII accepted his resignation, appointing him as titular archbishop of Drizipara. He died on 17 April 1965 in Tuchów and was originally buried at the church there; his remains were transferred to the cathedral in Łódź on 10 March 1968.
