= Schill =

Schill is a surname. Notable people with the surname include:

- a nickname for Curt Schilling (b. 1966), American baseball player
- Eleanor Schill (1904–2005), one of the first female medical doctors in England
- Ferdinand von Schill (1776–1809), Prussian soldier
- Kurt Schill (1911–1944), German communist and a resistance fighter
- Lambert Schill (1888–1976), German politician
- Michael H. Schill (b. 1958), American university president
- Otto Schill (1838–1918), German jurist
- Rachel Schill (b. 1982), Canadian softball player
- Ronald Schill (b. 1958), German ex-politician, retired judge

== Communities ==
- Name of Sadowice, Wrocław County during the 3rd Reich

== Companies ==
- Schill Malz, German sites of GrainCorp

== See also ==
- Party for a Rule of Law Offensive, a former German political party whose short name on ballots was "Schill" (for its leader Ronald Schill)
