= Sandomierz Cathedral =

Coordinates: 50°40′37″N 21°44′57″E

- Cathedral Basilica of the Nativity of the Blessed Virgin Mary
- Bazylika katedralna Narodzenia NMP w Sandomierzu
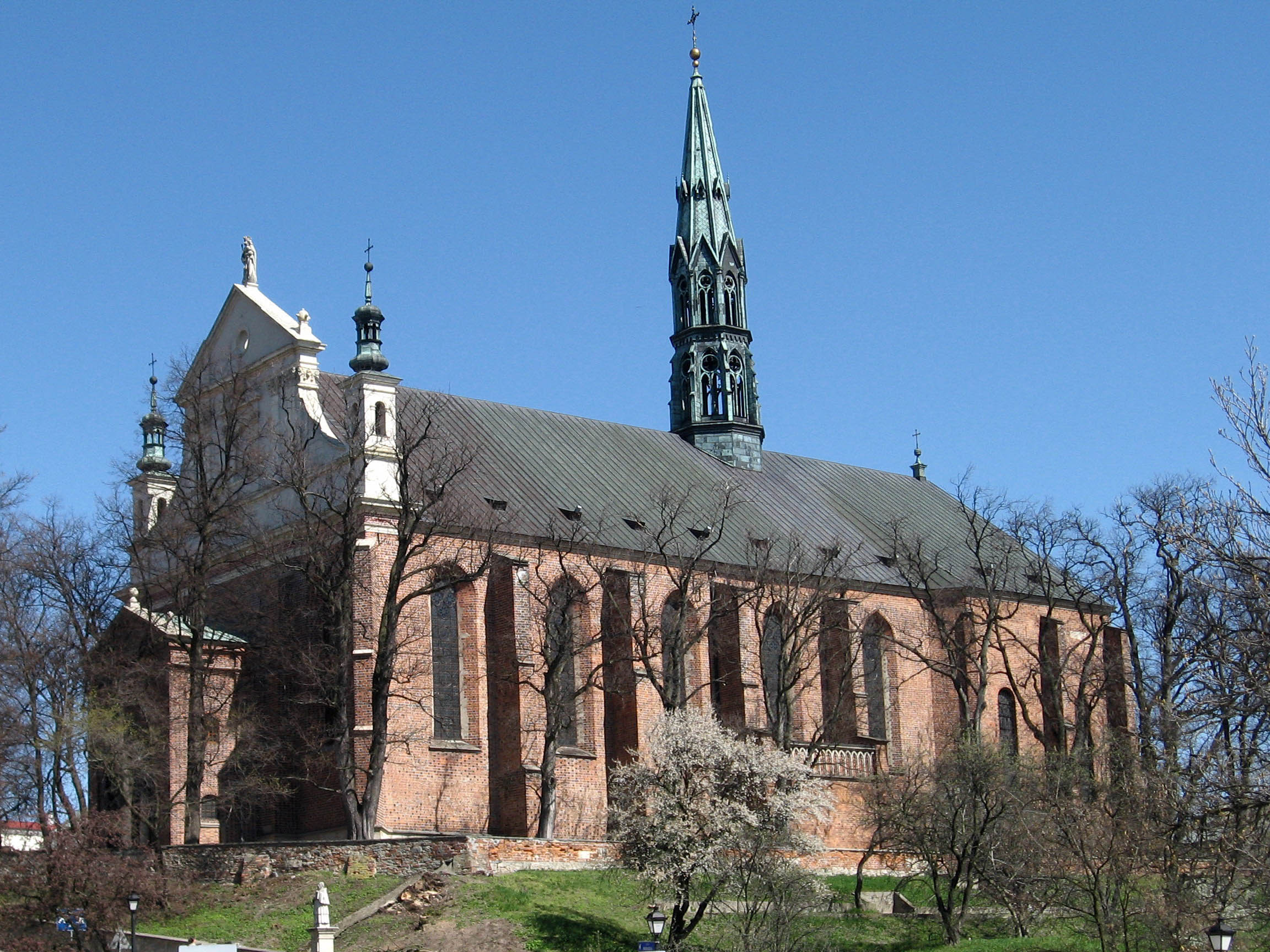
- Sandomierz Cathedral
- Location: Sandomierz, Poland
- Denomination: Roman Catholic

Architecture
- Style: Gothic, Baroque
- Years built: 1360

Cathedral Basilica of the Nativity of the Blessed Virgin Mary in Sandomierz (Polish: Bazylika katedralna Narodzenia NMP w Sandomierzu) is a gothic cathedral constructed in 1360. The cathedral was renovated in the baroque style in the 18th century, and first received the rank of cathedral in 1818.

== Blood libel paintings ==
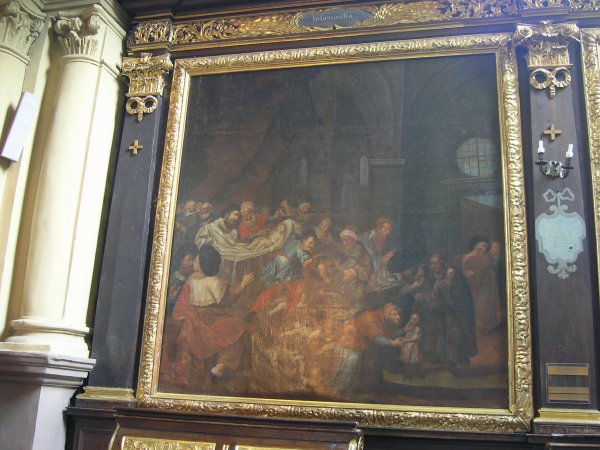
Blood libel painting

This cathedral contains a series of paintings built into the church's wooden panelling depicting the Martyrologium Romanum. The third painting shows the scene of a supposed blood libel which is claimed "...depicts ritual murders committed in Sandomierz by Tatarians on Christian children". The inscription next to the painting reads filius apothecarii ab infidelibus judeis sandomiriensibus occisus (English: son of an apothecary, killed by infidel Sandomierz Jews).

== Gallery ==
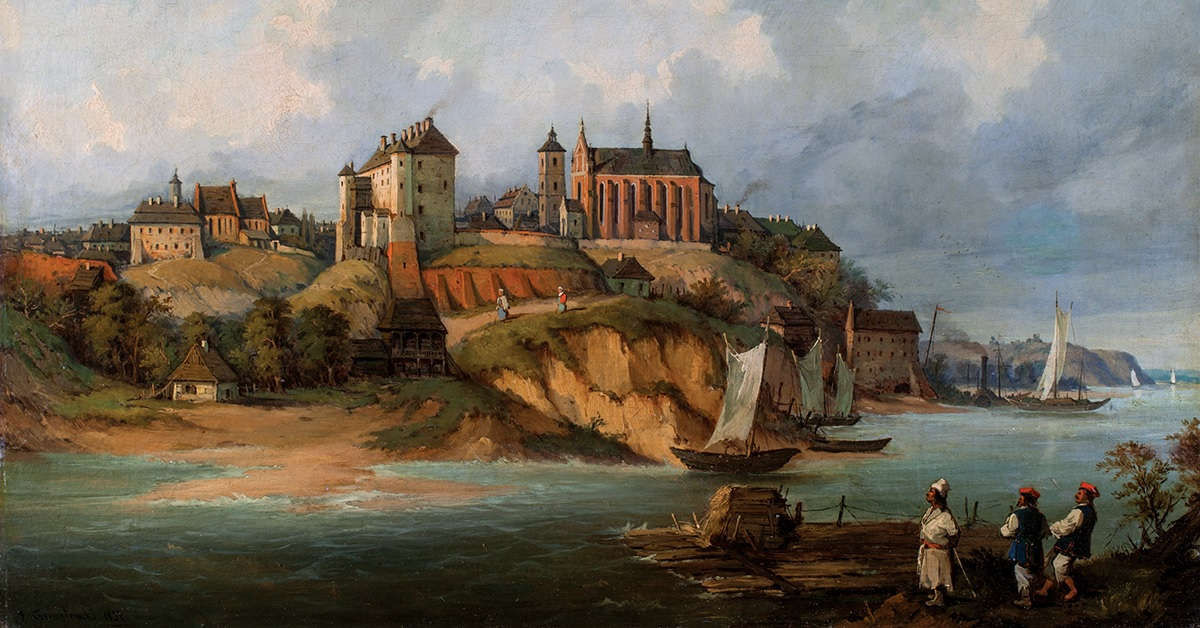
Painting of Sandomierz by Józef Szermentowski, with the cathedral in the center, 1855.

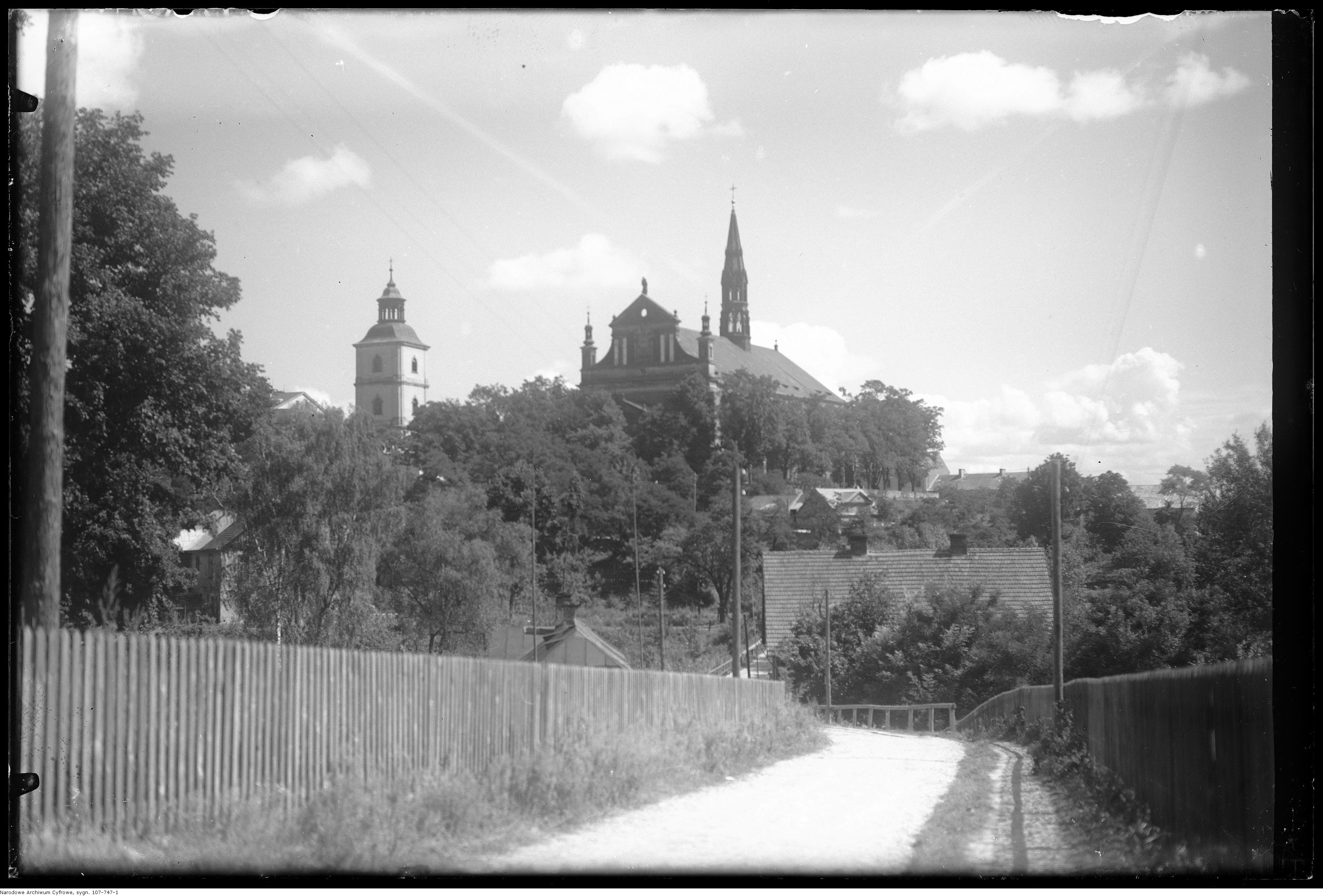
Photo of the cathedral taken by Narcyz Witczak-Witaczyński, 1935.

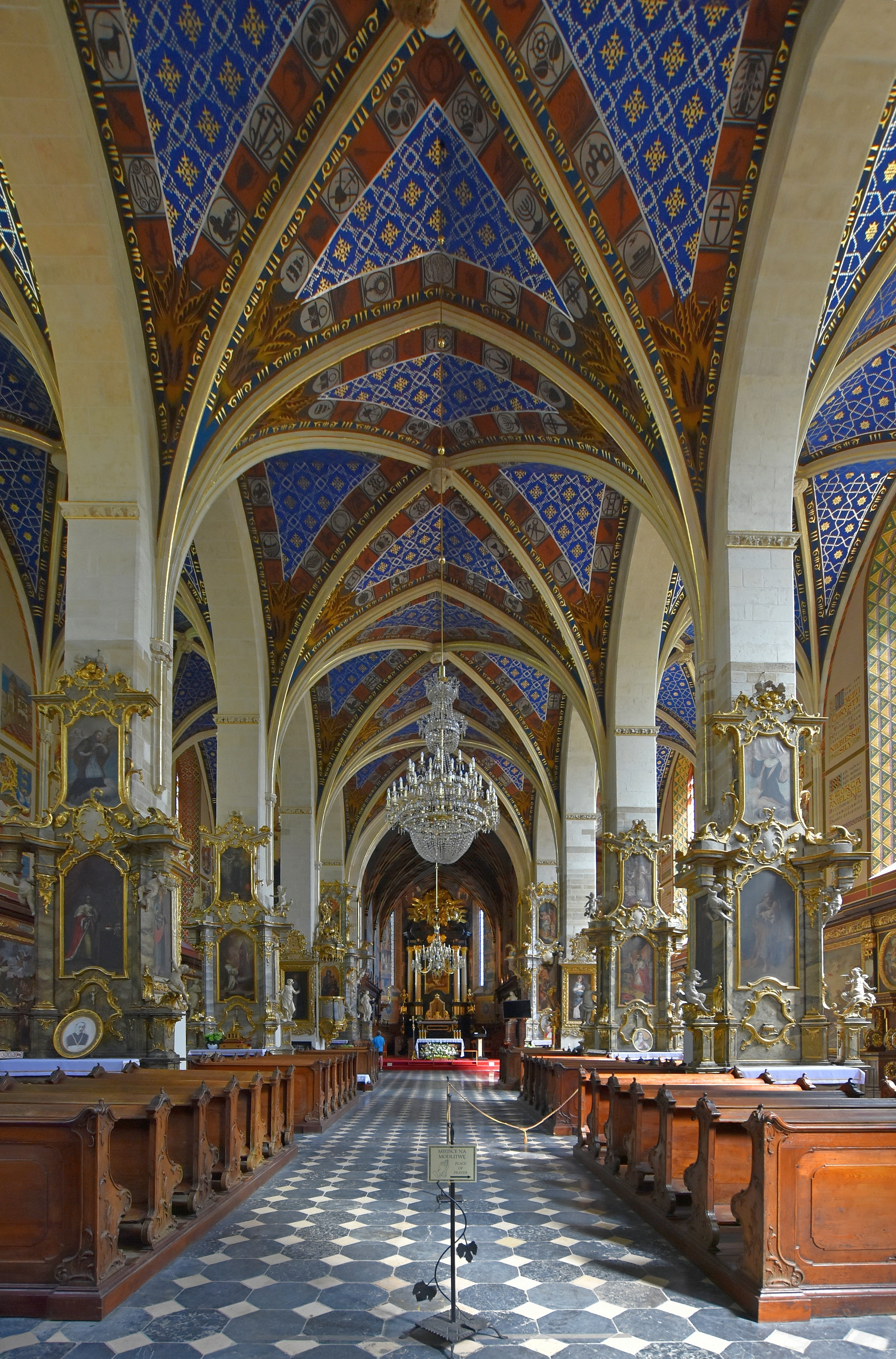
Nave of the cathedral.

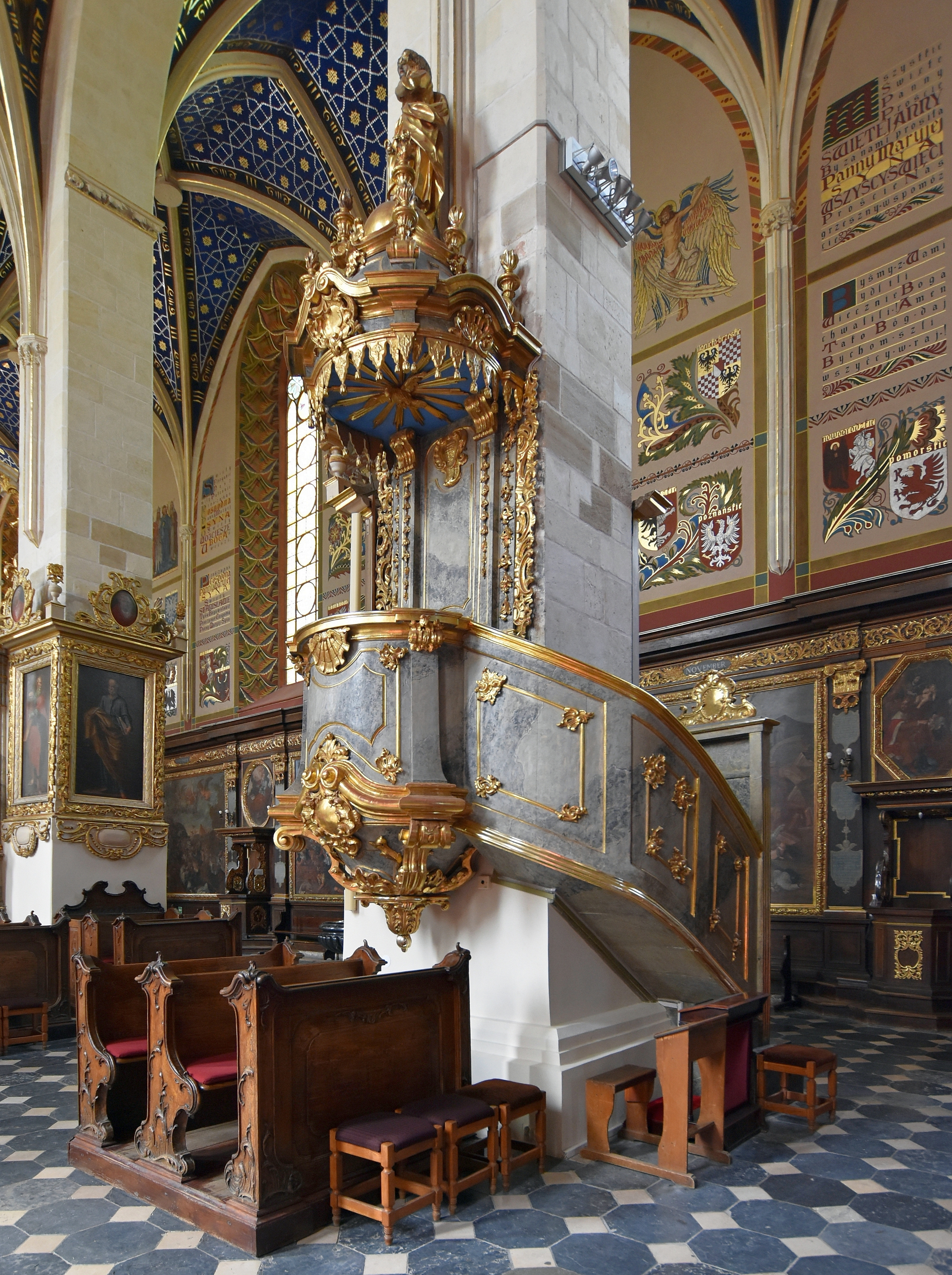
Baroquepulpit of the cathedral.

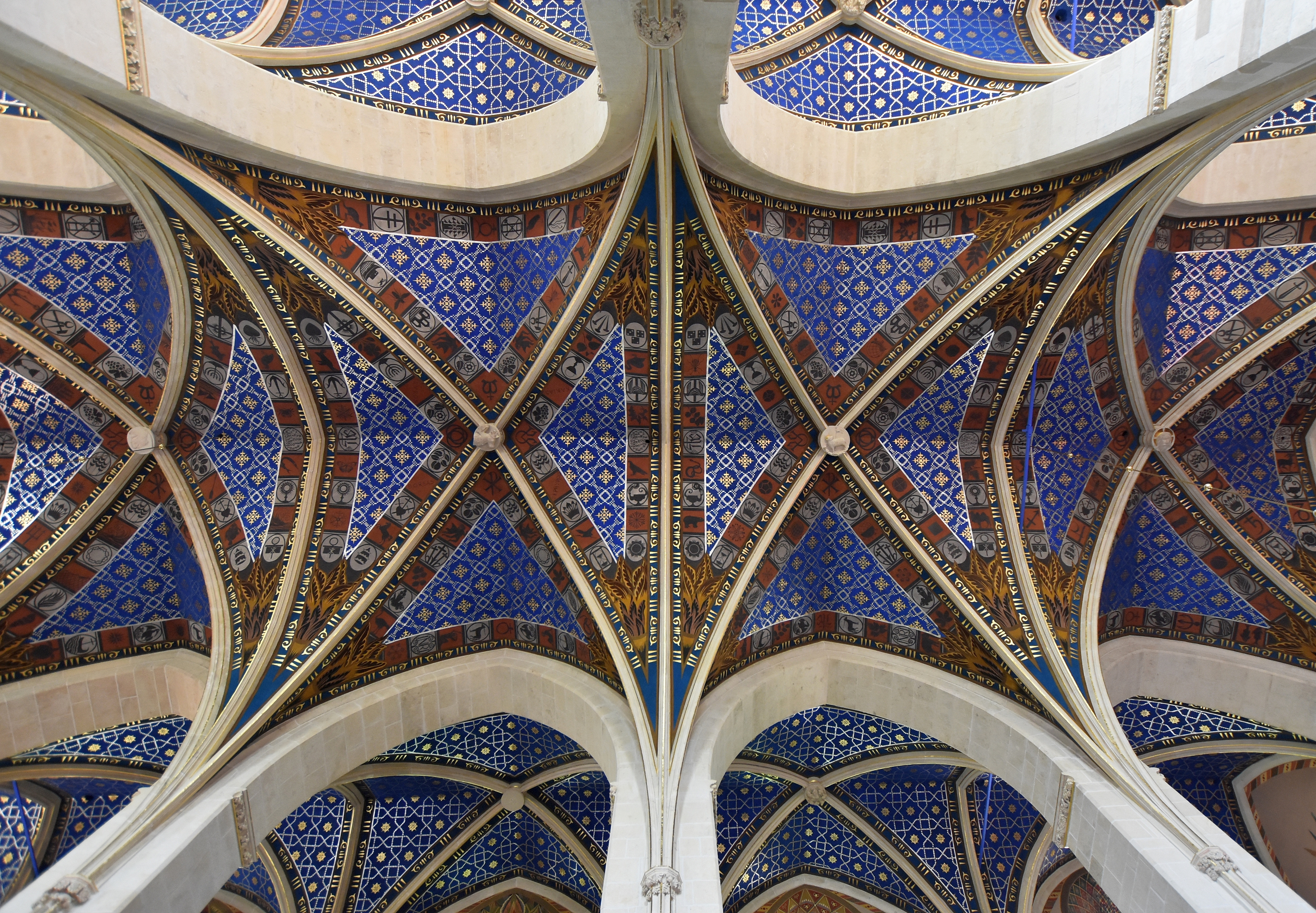
Ceiling of the nave.
