= Załuski (surname) =

Załuski, feminine: Załuska is a Polish toponymic surname. Outside Poland it may also be spelled as "Zalusky". "Załuska" may also be a masculine surname. Notable people with the surname include:

- Andrzej Chryzostom Załuski (1650–1711), Polish preacher, translator, writer, Chancellor of the Crown and bishop
- Anna Kasperlik-Załuska (1933–2016) Polish internist and endocrinologist, academic teacher, professor of medical sciences
- Andrzej Stanisław Kostka Załuski (1695–1758), bishop in the Polish-Lithuanian Commonwealth
- Józef Andrzej Załuski (1702–1774), Polish Catholic bishop and bibliophile
- Józef Bonawentura Załuski (1787–1866), Polish officer and diarist
- Louis Bartholomew Zaluski (1661–1721), Polish Catholic Cardinal
- Łukasz Załuska (born 1982), Polish footballer
- Marcin Załuski (1700–1765), Polish Catholic bishop and politician
- Teresa Załuska (1676–1759), Polish noblewoman and orator
- Wojciech Załuska (born 1961), Polish medical doctor, internist and nephrologist, professor of medical sciences, rector of the Medical University of Lublin (several terms)
- Zbigniew Załuski (1926–1978), Polish army officer, writer and politician

== See also ==
- Załucki
