= Catholic Church in Poland =

- Polish: Kościół katolicki w Polsce
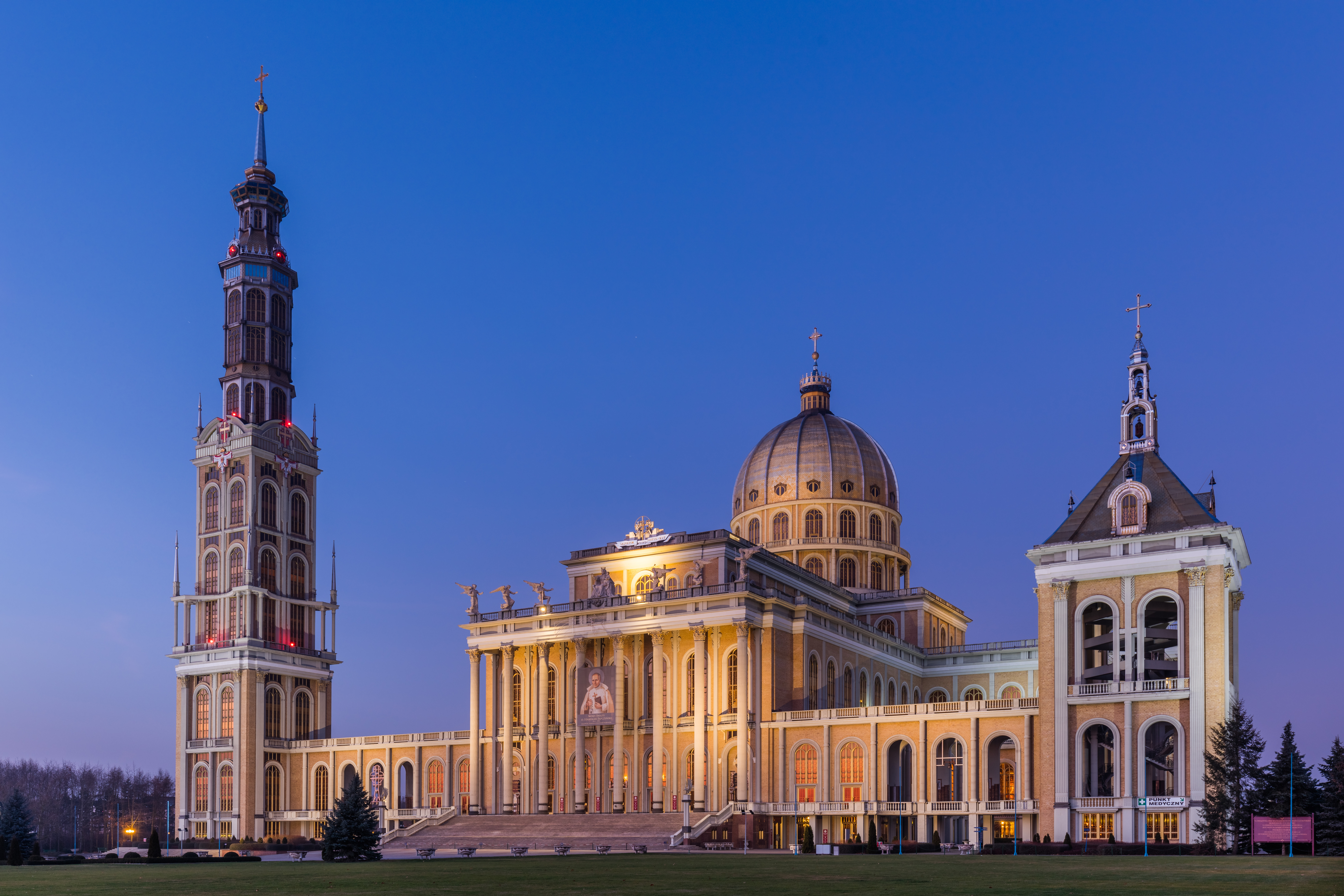
- Basilica of Our Lady of Licheń
- Type: National polity
- Classification: Catholic
- Orientation: Latin and Eastern Catholic
- Scripture: Bible
- Theology: Catholic theology
- Polity: Episcopal
- Governance: Episcopal Conference of Poland
- Pope: Leo XIV
- Primate of Poland: Wojciech Polak
- President: Tadeusz Wojda
- Divisions: Archbishop
- Divisions: Bishop
- Region: Poland
- Language: Polish, Latin
- Headquarters: Warsaw, Poland
- Founder: Mieszko I
- Origin: 966; Civitas Schinesghe
- Separations: Polish-Catholic Church of Republic of Poland; Protestantism in Poland
- Official website: KEP

The Catholic Church in Poland or Poland Catholic Church, is part of the worldwide Catholic Church in communion with the Pope in Rome. Established in the 9th century, it has maintained an unbroken communion with the bishop of Rome.

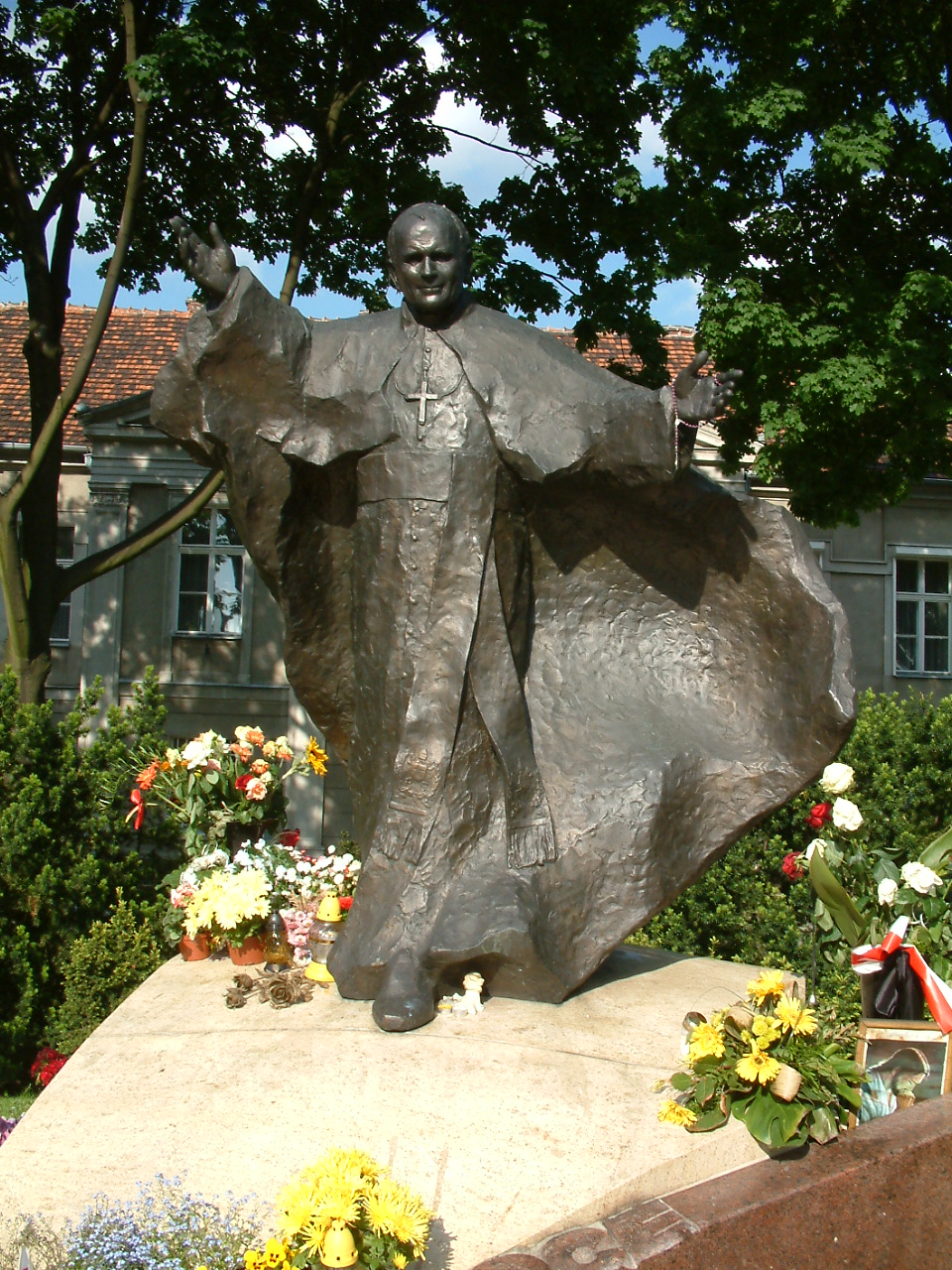
Monument in Poznań to Karol Wojtyła, a Pole who was Pope John Paul II from 1978 to 2005.

The Polish Latin Church includes 41 dioceses. There are three eparchies of the Ukrainian Greek Catholic Church in the country, with members of the Armenian Catholic Church under the Ordinariate for Eastern Catholics in Poland. The ordinaries of these jurisdictions comprise the Episcopal Conference of Poland. Combined, these comprise about 10,000 parishes and religious orders. There are 40.55 million registered Catholics (the data includes the number of infants baptized) in Poland. The primate of the Church is Wojciech Polak, Archbishop of Gniezno.

In the early 2000s, 99% of all children born in Poland were baptized Catholic. In 2015, the church recorded that 97.7% of Poland's population was Catholic. Other statistics suggested this proportion of adherents to Catholicism could be as low as 85%. The rate of decline has been described as "devastating" to the former social prestige and political influence that the Catholic Church in Poland once enjoyed. On the other hand, a 2023 survey of 36 countries with large Catholic populations using data from the World Values Survey revealed that 52% of Polish Catholics claimed to attend Mass weekly, the seventh highest of the nations surveyed and the highest among European countries. Most Poles adhere to Latin Catholicism. About 71.3% of the population identified themselves as such in the 2021 census, down from 88% in 2011.

== History ==
Ever since Poland officially adopted Christianity in 966, the Catholic Church has played an important religious, cultural and political role in the country post-schism. Identifying oneself as Catholic distinguished Polish culture and nationality from neighbouring Germany, especially eastern and northern Germany, which is mostly Lutheran, and the countries to the east which are Eastern Orthodox. During times of foreign oppression, the Catholic Church was a cultural guard in the fight for independence and national survival. For instance, the Polish abbey in Częstochowa, which successfully resisted a siege in the Swedish invasion of Poland in the 17th century, became a symbol of national resistance to the occupation. The establishment of a communist regime controlled by the Soviet Union following World War II allowed the Church to continue fulfilling this role, although recent allegations suggest there was some minor collaboration between Polish clergy and the regime.

The 1978 election of Polish Cardinal Karol Wojtyła as Pope John Paul II strengthened the ties of identification. John Paul's visits to Poland became rallying points for the faithful and galvanized opposition to the Soviet regime. His beatification in 2011 and canonization 3 years later further instilled pride and joy in the Polish people. In 2013, Pope Francis, John Paul II's 2nd successor (and who was made a cardinal by the Polish pope), announced that World Youth Day, the world's largest religious gathering of young people, would be held in Kraków, Poland in 2016.

== Number of Catholics in Poland ==
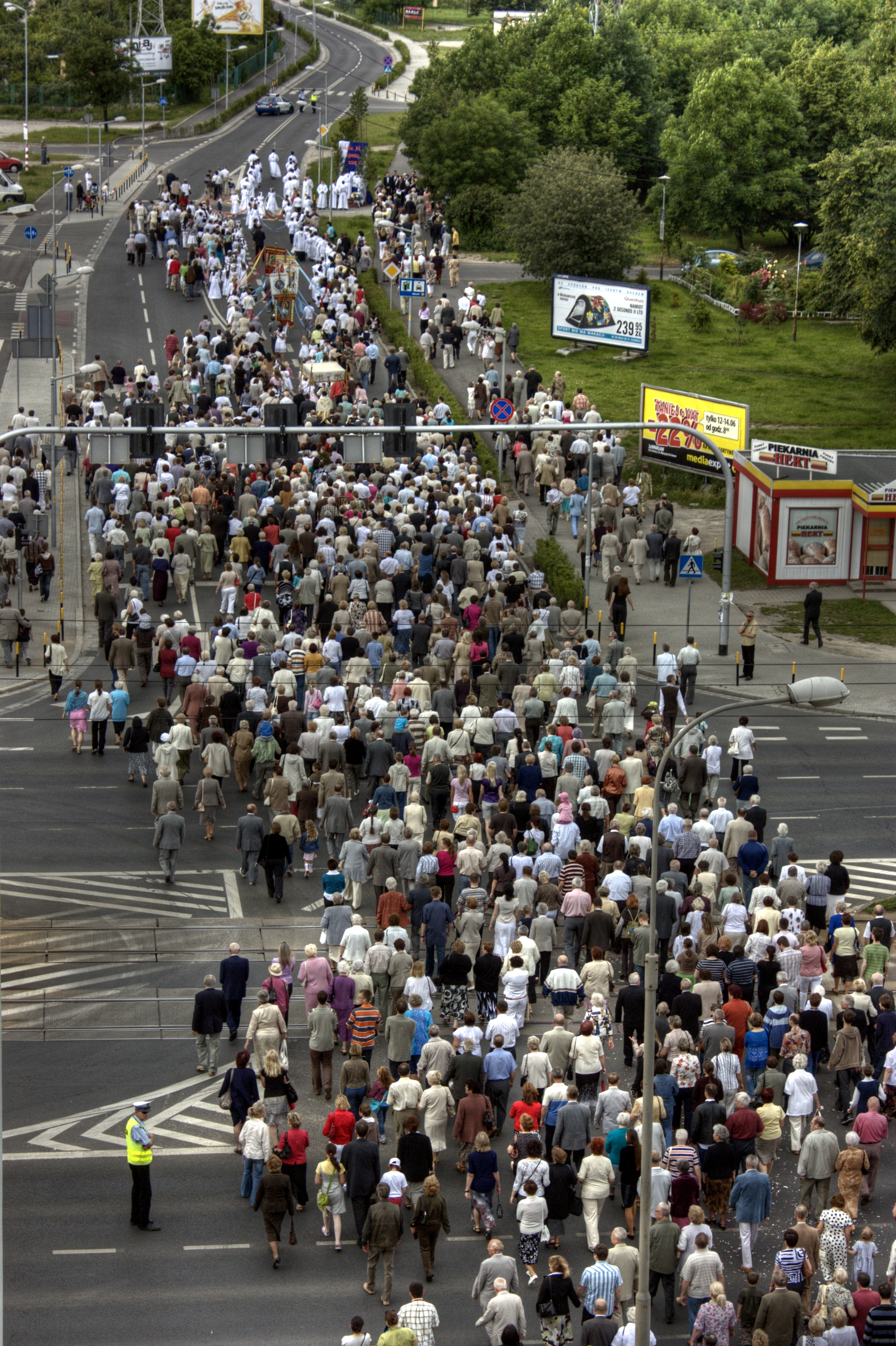
Procession in Wrocław, 2009.

As of 2023, a majority of Poles, approximately 71%, identified themselves as Catholic, and 58% said they are active practicing Catholics, according to a survey by the Centre for Public Opinion Research. According to the Ministry of Foreign Affairs of the Republic of Poland, 95% of Poles belong to the Catholic Church; this survey bases the number of adherents on the number of infants baptized, as provided by the Catholic Church. The CIA Factbook gives a number of 87.2% belonging to the Catholic Church in 2012. In the biggest part of Europe, the rates of religious observance have steadily decreased. However, Poland still remains one of the most devoutly religious countries in Europe. Polish Catholics participate in the sacraments more frequently than their counterparts in most Western European and North American countries. A 2023 study by the Church itself revealed that 98.5% of Poles go to confession at least once a year, while 97% of the respondents say they do so more often than once a year. By contrast, a 2005 study by Georgetown University's Center for Applied Research on the Apostolate revealed that only 14% of American Catholics take part in the sacrament of penance once a year, with a mere 2% doing so more frequently. Tarnów is the most religious city in Poland, and Łódź is the least. The southern and eastern parts of Poland are more active in their religious practices than those of the West and North. The majority of Poles continue to declare themselves Catholic. This is in stark contrast to the otherwise similar neighboring Czech Republic, which is one of the least religious practicing areas on Earth, with only 35% declaring "they believe there is a God" of any kind.

A 2014 report by L'Osservatore Romano found that the proportion of Polish Catholics attending Sunday Mass was approximately 39.1%. At the same time, however, this partly results from the fact that since 2004 2.1 million Poles have emigrated to Western Europe. Writing for the Catholic weekly Tygodnik Powszechny, Church sociologist Rev. Prof. Janusz Mariański has noted that these two million Polish emigrants are still listed in their parish records as members, so when Mass attendance is measured such emigres lower the official records. The proportion of Mass attendees receiving Holy Communion is rising, while the number of Polish Catholic priests continues to rise as ordinations outpace deaths in Poland, though the number of nuns is decreasing.

=== Religious practice ===
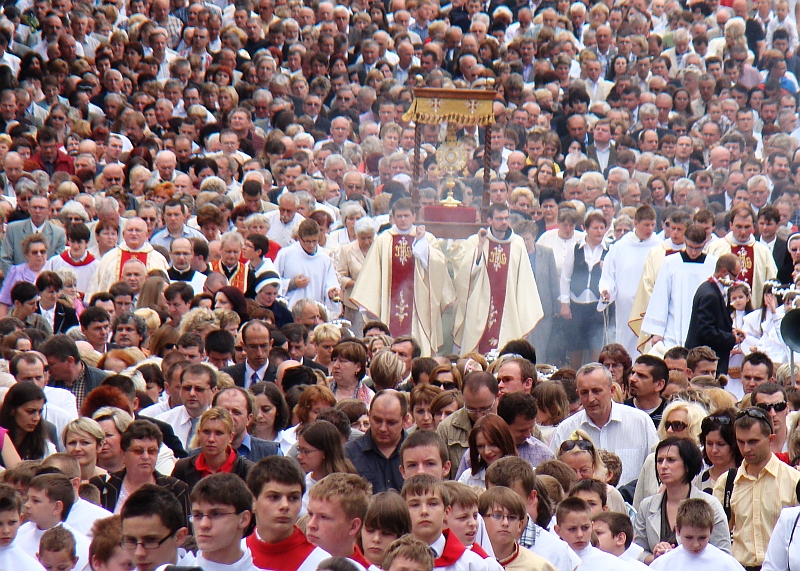
Corpus Christi in Sanok

The Centre for Public Opinion Research regularly conducts surveys on religious practice in Poland. A 2012 document reported that for more than a quarter-century church attendance and declarations of religious faith have been stable, decreasing only minimally since 2005 when the grief related to the death of Pope John Paul II led to an increase in religious practice among Poles. In a 2012 study, 52% of Poles declared that they attend religious services at least once a week, 38% do so once or twice a month, and 11% do so never or almost never. Meanwhile, 94% of Poles consider themselves to be religious believers (9% of whom consider themselves "deeply religious"), while only 6% of Poles claim that they are non-believers. According to the Church's own sources, 36.3% of Catholics required to attend the Sunday Mass, take part in it.

Easter continues to be an important holiday for Polish Catholics. According to a 2012 study by the CBOS (Centre for Public Opinion Research), 74% of Poles make an effort to participate in the sacrament of penance before Easter, 59% make an effort to attend the Stations of the Cross or Gorzkie żale (an increase of 6% since 2003), 57% want to improve themselves for the better (an increase of 7%), 49% want to help the needy (an increase of 8%), and 46% want to pray more .

A CBOS opinion poll from April 2014 found the following:

Lenten and Easter observances: Do you...? (CBOS 2014 poll)
Fast on Good Friday	83%
Go to Easter Confession	70%
Have ashes put on your head on Ash Wednesday	64%
Take part in the Easter Triduum celebrations	56%
Take part in an Easter retreat	53%
Take part in the Way of The Cross	52%
Celebrate the Resurrection	48%

Do you try to limit entertainment during Lent? (CBOS 2014 poll)
Yes	53%
No	44%
Hard to say	3%

During Lent, do you think about your life more often? (CBOS 2014 poll)
Yes	38%
No	60%
Hard to say	2%

== Church-state relationship ==
=== Legal Status ===
The current relationship between the Catholic Church and the state in Poland is formally determined by the Constitution of 1997. Specifically, this is outlined in Articles 25 and 53 of the Constitution. Article 25 sets out the legal status of churches and other religious organizations, highlighting state neutrality and mutual independence. Whereas, Article 53, sets forth the rights of individuals in the area of religion, and in particular freedom of conscience and religion. On the other hand, allowing religious education in schools demonstrates that religion has an official role in the public sphere such as education. The relationship between the state and the Church is characterized as secular. At the same time, the Constitution was drawn upon the Concordat between the Holy See and the Republic of Poland which was officially concluded in 1993. This is also enshrined in the Constitution, particularly Article 25 highlights that the relations between these two entities are regulated by law and the international agreement. These provisions establish a framework of a model of friendly separation.

=== Current Debates ===
During the communist era, the Catholic Church played a significant role as a resistance movement fighting against the regime, establishing a distinct position within society. After the regime ended, it attempted to maintain its socio-political power by employing political and legal methods, focusing on the content of public policies in the then newly democratized Poland. In the post-communist Poland, an accelerated decline in public approval and trust for the Church can be observed, as a result of its excessive involvement in politics, alongside significant controversies. One of the issues was the direct engagement of the Church and clergy in politics. This was visible during the parliamentary elections of 1991, it which it gave support to right-wing parties. Eventually, those parties have received poor electoral support which led the church to refrain from such direct support in subsequent elections.

Another serious worldwide scandal within the Catholic Church. was the increasing number of clerical sexual abuse cases, which also took place in Poland. For many years, in Poland this topic did not gain sufficient media attention, which was is a key tool to raise awareness of these issues. Due to the integrity of Catholicism in the political arena, no political authority has started an investigation on this topic. Therefore, the public criticism on this issue touched upon the negligence of the Church to uncover those cases and to properly address them.

The current debates on political influence of the Church also appears in discussions of abortion in Poland, which is a polarizing issue in the country. The abortion law introduced in 1993 has been described as being among the most restrictive in Europe. This regulation also became known as ‘abortion compromise’ between different political and social group including the Catholic Church. The Church has directly impacted women's reproductive rights by influencing legal provisions, pressure on judicial authorities and efforts to shape public opinion. On the other hand, it also had an indirect role on shaping public discourse through the use of language and changing the interpretation of abortion from a medical procedure to a question of morality. In 2020 the Polish constitutional tribunal restricted the abortion law by annulling one of the provisions of 1993 which were abortions in cases of fatal or life-limiting fetal anomaly. This ruling has resulted in public discontent and led to large-scale protest and strikes. A significant portion of frustration expressed during the protests was directed at the Church, which were visible in the form of religious service interruption and anti-clerical graffiti on church walls across Poland. The abortion protests has been considered to further the ongoing trend of secularization and the decreasing religious identification among younger generations.

=== Apostasy ===
During the October 2020 Polish protests, enquiries regarding the procedure for apostasy from the Polish Catholic Church became popular. Web search engine queries showed high frequencies for "apostasy" (Polish: apostazja) and "how to do apostasy" (Polish: jak dokonać apostazji), and a Facebook event titled "Quit the church at Christmas" was followed by 5000 people.

As of 2020, the formal apostasy procedure in the Polish Catholic Church is a procedure defined on 7 October 2015 by the Episcopal Conference of Poland, which became effective as of 19 February 2016. It can only be done in person, by delivering an application to a church parish priest. The procedure cannot be done by email, post, or state administrative services.

== Latin territories ==
- Archdiocese
  - Diocese

Latin names of dioceses in italics.

Map of Poland with dioceses

- Białystok, Bialostocensis (1)
  - Drohiczyn, Drohiczinensis (2)
  - Łomża, Lomzensis (3)
- Cracow, Cracoviensis (4)
  - Bielsko–Żywiec, Bielscensis-Zyviecensis (5)
  - Kielce, Kielcensis (6)
  - Tarnów, Tarnoviensis (7)
- Częstochowa, Czestochoviensis (8)
  - Radom, Radomensis (9)
  - Sosnowiec, Sosnoviensis (10)
- Gdańsk, Gedanensis (11)
  - Pelplin, Pelplinensis (12)
  - Toruń, Thoruniensis (13)
- Gniezno, Gnesnensis (14)
  - Bydgoszcz, Bydgostiensis (15)
  - Włocławek, Vladislaviensis (16)
- Katowice, Katovicensis (17)
  - Gliwice, Glivicensis (18)
  - Opole, Opoliensis (19)
- Łódź, Lodziensis (20)
  - Łowicz, Lovicensis (21)
- Lublin, Lublinensis (22)
  - Sandomierz, Sandomiriensis (23)
  - Siedlce, Siedlecensis (24)
- Poznań, Posnaniensis (25)
  - Kalisz, Calissiensis (26)
- Przemyśl, Premisliensis (27)
  - Rzeszów, Rzeszoviensis (28)
  - Zamość-Lubaczów, Zamosciensis-Lubaczoviensis (29)
- Szczecin-Kamień, Sedinensis-Caminensis (30)
  - Koszalin-Kołobrzeg, Coslinensis-Colubreganus (31)
  - Zielona Góra-Gorzów Wielkopolski, Viridimontanensis-Gorzoviensis (32)
- Warmia (Olsztyn), Varmiensis (33)
  - Elbląg, Elbingensis (34)
  - Ełk, Liccanensis (35)
- Warsaw, Varsaviensis (36)
  - Płock, Plocensis (37)
  - Warsaw-Praga, Varsaviensis-Pragensis (38)
- Wrocław, Vratislaviensis (39)
  - Legnica, Legnicensis (40)
  - Świdnica, Suidniciensis (41)

== Ukrainian Greek Catholic territory ==
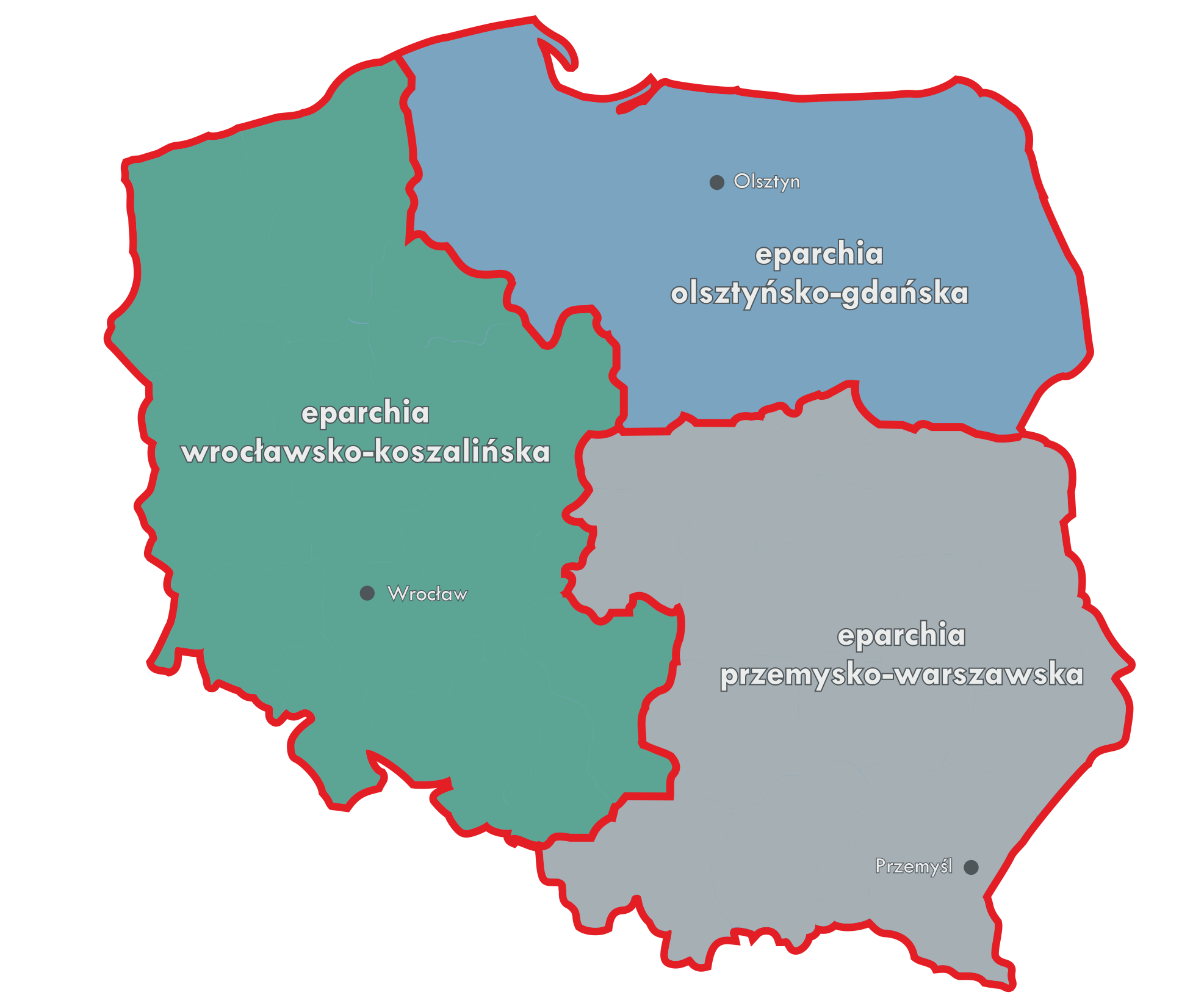
Map of Poland with eparchies

- Archeparchy
  - Eparchies
- Ukrainian Catholic Archeparchy of Przemyśl–Warsaw
  - Ukrainian Catholic Eparchy of Olsztyn–Gdańsk
  - Ukrainian Catholic Eparchy of Wrocław-Koszalin

== Other jurisdictions ==
- Military Ordinariate of Polish Army
- Ordinariate for Eastern Catholics in Poland

== See also ==
- The Most Holy Virgin Mary, Queen of Poland
- List of saints of Poland
- Religion in Poland
- Christianity in Poland
- Sejm cross
- Enthronement movement
- Protestantism in Poland
- Polish Orthodox Church
- Religious denominations in Poland
- List of Catholic dioceses in Poland
- List of Polish cardinals
- Reorganization of occupied dioceses during World War II
- Nazi persecution of the Catholic Church in Poland
- Ukrainian Greek Catholic Church
- Separation of church and state
