= Zalusky =

Zalusky is a form of the Polish surname Załuski that may be used outside Poland. Notable people with the surname include:

- Jack Zalusky, American professional baseball catcher
- Joe Zalusky, American minor league baseball player and an American football player and coach
