= Protestantism in Poland =

Protestantism in Poland
1. Lutherans (42.0%)
2. Pentecostals (34.0%)
3. Seventh-day Adventists (7.00%)
4. Baptists (4.00%)
5. Methodists (3.00%)
6. Calvinists (2.00%)
7. Other Protestants (8.00%)

Protestantism in Poland is the third largest faith in Poland, after the Catholic Church (32,440,722) and the Polish Orthodox Church (503,996). As of 2018 there were 103 registered Protestant denominations in Poland, and in 2023 there were 130,000 Protestants in the country (0.35% of the population).

== History ==
King Sigismund II Augustus came to power during the Reformation. His words “I am not the ruler of human consciences" gave the country a tolerance for the new faith. During this time, several members of the nobility decided to follow Lutheranism or Calvinism. In 1565, the Polish Brethren came into existence as a Nontrinitarian sect of Calvinism. In 1573, a year after the King's death, the Polish Sejm approved the Warsaw Confederation, ensuring freedom of religion to all religious communities in Poland and Lithuania. This was created to ensure peace and internal stability of the state. However, there was opposition to the new churches and the Polish Brethren were banned and some of its leaders executed.

By the first half of the 18th century, Protestants were barred from most civil offices, including being elected to the Sejm.

Eventually King Charles XII of Sweden forced the Habsburg Emperor Joseph I to allow Protestants to practice unencumbered. The Treaty of Altranstaedt in 1707 allowed new churches to be built and the return of more than 100 churches confiscated during the Counter-Reformation. The Protestant community began to grow again, especially in Cieszyn.

== 21st century ==
Most Protestants (mainly Lutherans) in the country live in historically Protestant regions such as Cieszyn Silesia and Warmia-Masuria and in major urban areas. The only town in the country with a majority Protestant population is Wisła.

Major denominations (with at least two thousand followers) classified as Protestant by Poland's Central Statistical Office (as of 2020) include:

- Evangelical-Augsburg Church in Poland: 60,900 members
- Pentecostal Church in Poland: 24,840 adherents
- Seventh-day Adventist Church in Poland: 9,838 adherents
- Fellowship of Christian Churches in Poland (Kościół Chrystusowy w RP): 6,645 adherents
- Baptist Union of Poland: 5,470 baptized members
- New Apostolic Church in Poland: 5,257 adherents
- Church of God in Christ (Pentecostal): 5,023 adherents
- United Methodist Church in Poland: 4,443 adherents
- Evangelical-Reformed Church in Poland: 3,200 adherents
- Church of Free Christians in the Republic of Poland: 3,045 adherents (data for 2019)
- Church of God in Poland (Pentecostal): 2,826 adherents
- Church of Evangelical Christians in the Republic of Poland: 2,357 adherents

== See also ==
- Reformation in Poland
- Religion in Poland
- Catholic Church in Poland
- Polish Orthodox Church
- United Evangelical Church in Poland
