= Józef Andrzej Załuski =

Polish Catholic priest

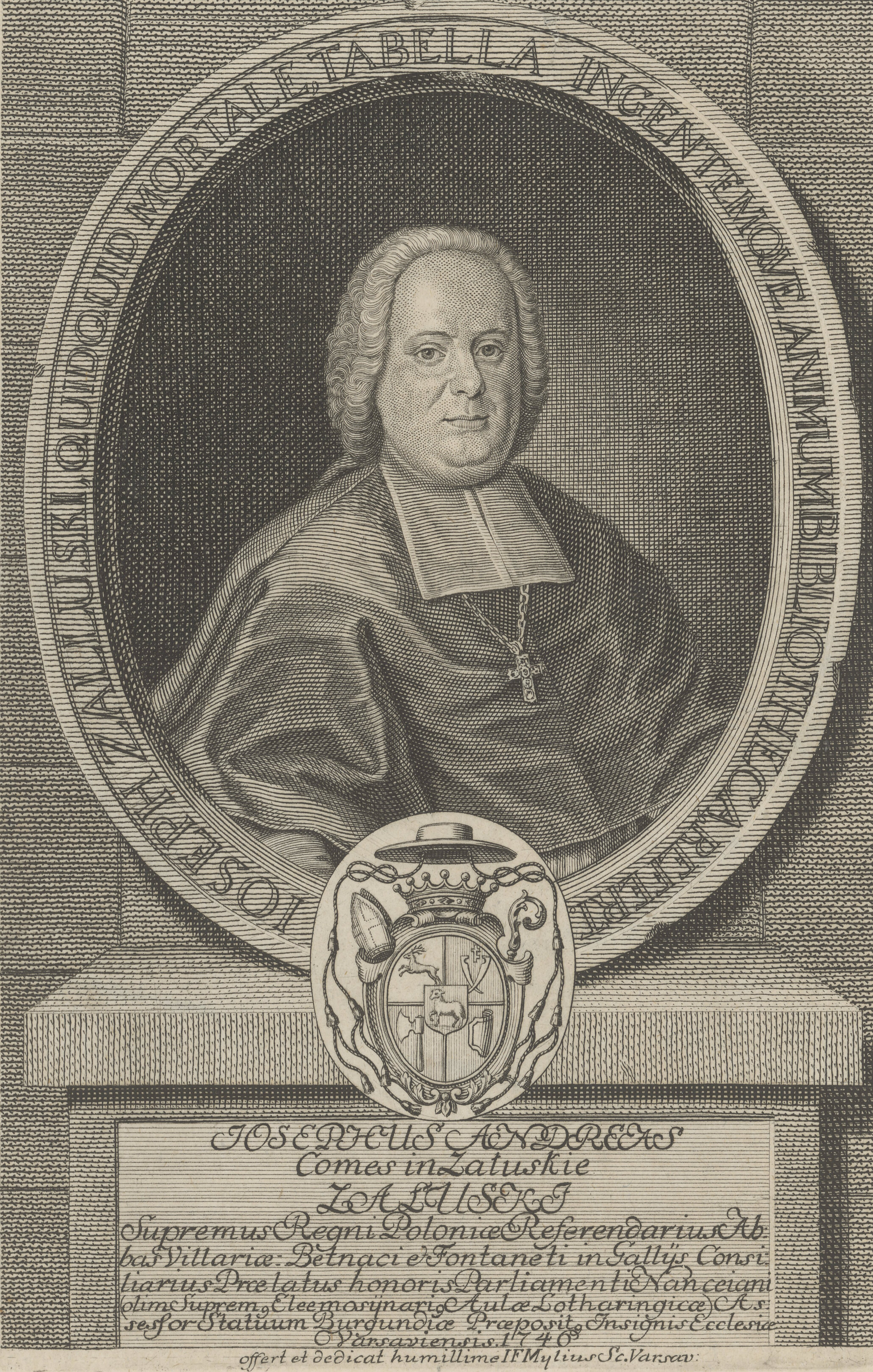
Bishop Józef Andrzej Załuski, founder of Poland's first public library

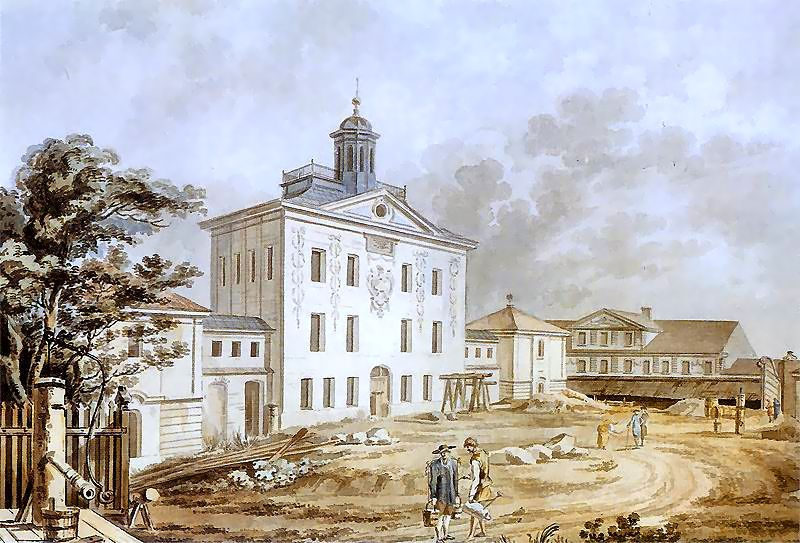
Załuski Library – Poland's first public library

Józef Andrzej Załuski (12 January 1702 – 9 January 1774) was a Polish Catholic priest, Bishop of Kiev, a sponsor of learning and culture, and a renowned bibliophile. A member of the Polish nobility (szlachta), bearing the hereditary Junosza coat-of-arms, he is most famous as co-founder of the Załuski Library, one of the largest 18th-century book collections in the world.

== Life ==
Together with his brother Andrzej Stanisław Załuski he was raised by their uncles (Andrzej Chryzostom Załuski, bishop of Warmia, and Ludwik Załuski, bishop of Płock). Józef was educated in the Polish–Lithuanian Commonwealth (Warsaw, Gdańsk, Kraków) as well as abroad (Sorbonne in Paris). He took Holy Orders in 1727. In his career he was a Great Crown Referendary (referendarz wielki koronny) from 1728 and canon of Kraków. As a supporter of King Stanisław Leszczyński he accompanied him to France in the 1730s, where he was a royal chaplain in the royal court of Leszczyński's wife, Queen Katarzyna Opalińska. He controlled some of the Church's property in France; after his return to Poland he became the abbot of Wąchock. In 1759 he became the bishop of Kiev and in 1762 he led the synod of the diocese.

He was active on the Polish political scene, opposing King Stanisław August Poniatowski, as well as the interference of the Russian empire in Polish domestic matters. For that, in 1767 (at the Repnin Sejm) he was arrested by Russian ambassador Nicholas Repnin, and until 1773 he was imprisoned in Kaluga, Russia.

The greatest passion of Załuski's brothers was books. Together with his brother Andrzej Stanisław Załuski (1695–1758, bishop of Kraków and crown chancellor) he obtained the collections of such previous Polish bibliophiles as Jakub Zadzik, Krzysztof Opaliński, Tomasz Ujejski, Janusz Wiśniowiecki, Jerzy Mniszech and Jan III Sobieski. From the 1730s they planned the creation of a library and in 1747 the brothers founded the Załuski's Library (Biblioteka Załuskich), considered to be the first Polish public library and one of the largest libraries in the world at the time. Located in Daniłowiczowski Palace in Warsaw, it was one of the world's finest libraries, with a collection of about 400,000 printed items and manuscripts. After the death of its founders, the Załuski brothers, the newly formed National Education Commission took charge of the library, renaming it the Załuski Brothers Library of the Republic. Twenty years later in 1794, in the aftermath of the second Partition of Poland and Kościuszko Uprising, Russian troops, on orders from Russian Czarina Catherine II, plundered the library and took its collection to Saint Petersburg, where the Imperial Public Library was formed a year later.

Załuski was an important member of the Enlightenment in Poland, one of the founders of the Polish Literary Society (Towarzystwo Literatów) in 1765. He convinced Stanisław Konarski to start his work on Volumina legum, eight comprehensive volumes of Sejm legislation up to date, continued after his death and reaching eight volumes by 1786. He was co-publisher of Warschauer Bibilothek (1753–1758). He supported the writer Benedykt Chmielowski, historian Gottfried Lengnich, and sponsored the publication of many foreign books and magazines. He was also a translator himself, translating French dramas. He was the author of works from the fields of theology, history and library science (Bibliotheca poetarum Polonorum (1752, 1754), Bibliotheca Polona magnauniversalis (manuscript destroyed in 1944)).

After his death, the Bishopric of Kiev was taken by Ignacy Franciszek Ossoliński.
