= Załuski Library =

Library in Warsaw, Poland

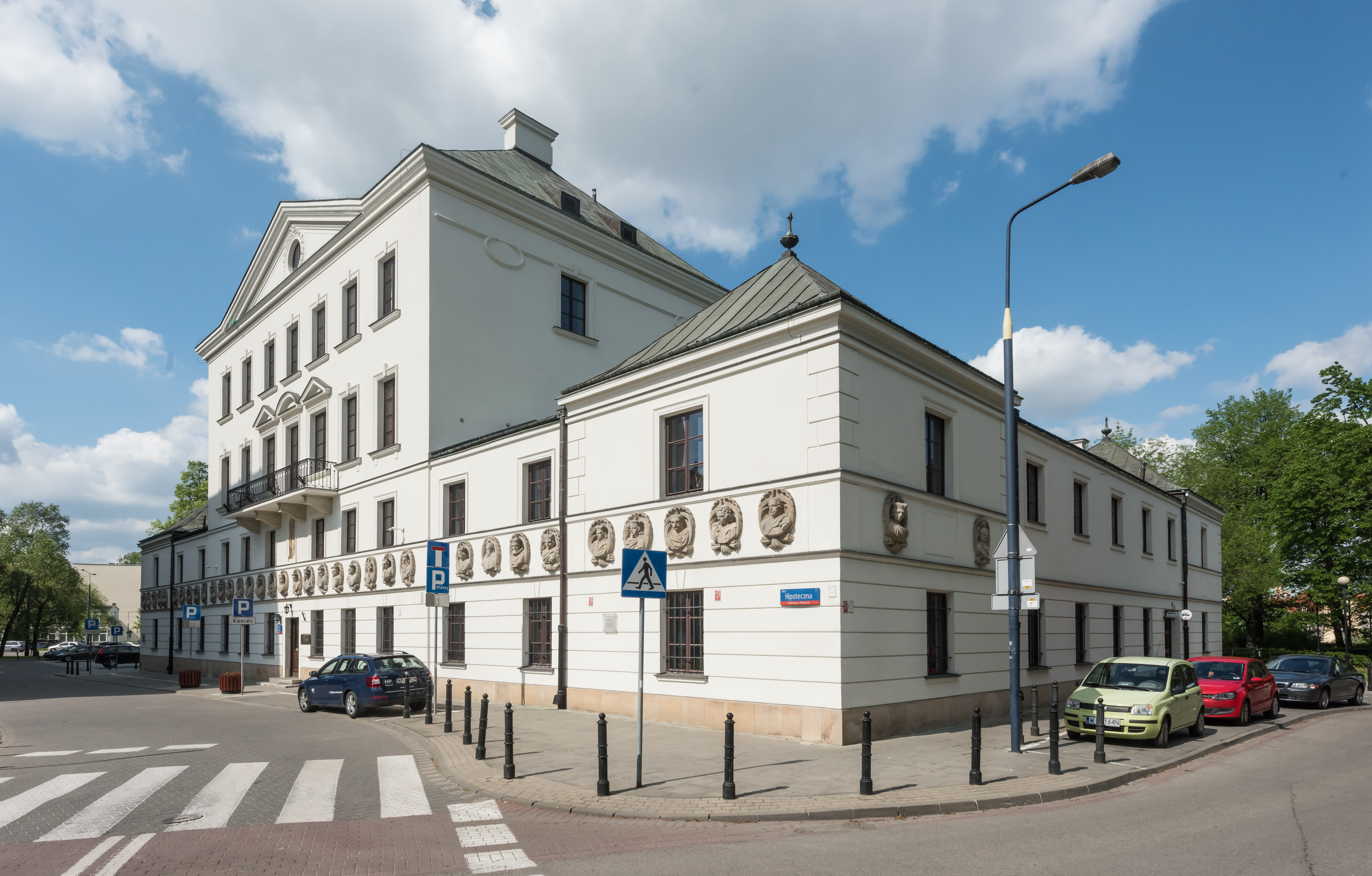
- Załuski Library's original seat: now "House Under the Kings" (Dom Pod Królami), Warsaw

General information
- Architectural style: Rococo
- Location: Warsaw, Poland
- Coordinates: 52°14′43″N 21°00′27″E
- Construction started: 1621
- Completed: 1624
- Client: Józef Andrzej Załuski, Andrzej Stanisław Załuski

Design and construction
- Architect: Francesco Antonio Melana (1736-1745)

The Załuski Library (Polish: Biblioteka Załuskich, Latin: Bibliotheca Zalusciana) established in Warsaw in 1747 by Józef Andrzej Załuski and his brother, Andrzej Stanisław Załuski, both Roman Catholic bishops, was a public library nationalized and renamed upon its founders' death into the Załuski Library of the Commonwealth (Polish: Biblioteka Rzeczypospolitej Załuskich) which existed until the final demise of Polish-Lithuanian Commonwealth in the Third Partition of Poland in 1795.

== Overview ==
The library was the first Polish public library, the largest library in Poland, and one of the earliest public libraries in Europe. After the Kościuszko Uprising (1794), Russian troops, acting on orders from Czarina Catherine II, seized the library's holdings and transported them to her personal collection at Saint Petersburg, where a year later it formed the cornerstone of the newly founded Imperial Public Library. In the 1920s the government of the Russian Soviet Federative Socialist Republic returned some of the former Załuski Library holdings to the recently established Second Polish Republic following the Treaty of Riga, and they were later included in the National Library (Biblioteka Narodowa), founded in 1928 (hence, the latter considers itself the continuation of the Załuski Library). The majority of the original Załuski collection was, however, deliberately destroyed by the German troops during the planned destruction of Warsaw in October 1944, following the collapse of the Warsaw Uprising.

== History ==
=== Creation ===
The Załuski brothers' greatest passion was book collecting, including collecting historical manuscripts and incunabula. Józef Andrzej Załuski and his brother Andrzej Stanisław Załuski acquired the collections of earlier Polish bibliophiles such as Jakub Zadzik, Krzysztof Opaliński, Tomasz Ujejski, Janusz Wiśniowiecki, Jerzy Mniszech and Jan III Sobieski (the latter, from his granddaughter, Maria Karolina Sobieska). Beginning from the 1730s the brothers planned the creation of a public library.

=== Operation ===
The Załuski Library was considered the first Polish public library and one of the largest libraries in the contemporary world. In all of Europe there were only two or three libraries that could boast such holdings. The library initially held some 200,000 items, which grew to some 400,000 printed items, maps and manuscripts by the end of the 1780s. It also accumulated a collection of art, scientific instruments, and plant and animal specimens.

This library, open on Tuesdays and Thursdays from 7:00 a.m. to 7:00 p.m., asked patrons to be quiet and to say a prayer on behalf of the Załuski brothers. The library initially lent out its collection items, but soon reversed this policy by prohibiting to take the books outside the library, as book theft became a growing problem, to that extent that the bishop patrons decided to ask the pope for help. Responding to their request, in 1752 pope Benedict XIV issued a papal bull that threatened to excommunicate individuals taking the books from this library; even that did not eliminate the problem completely.

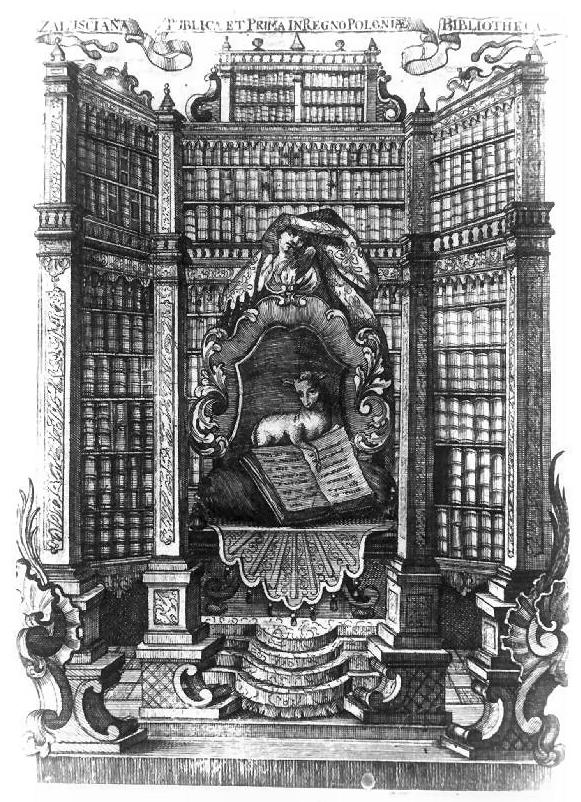
Załuski Library exlibris

After the brothers' deaths, the newly-formed Commission for National Education took charge of the library, renaming it the Załuski Library of the Republic.

=== Looting and destruction ===
Twenty years later in 1794, in the aftermath of the second Partition of Poland and Kościuszko Uprising, Russian troops, on orders from Russian Czarina Catherine II, emptied the library and dispatched the whole collection to Saint Petersburg. The looted books formed the foundations of the Imperial Public Library on its formation a year later; meanwhile, its looted Polish predecessor was abolished and destined by the victorious three powers to be sent into oblivion along with its owner, the Polish state itself.

Parts of the collections were damaged or destroyed as they were mishandled while being removed from the library and transported to Russia, and many were stolen. According to the historian Joachim Lelewel, the books from the Zaluskis' collection "could be bought at Grodno by the basket". The collection was later dispersed among several Russian libraries.

=== Successor ===
Some parts of the Zaluski collection returned to Congress Poland on two separate dates in the nineteenth century: 1842 and 1863. In the 1920s, in the aftermath of the Polish-Soviet War and the Treaty of Riga around 50,000 collection items were repatriated to Poland by the RSFSR's government. which served as the cornerstone of the National Library of Poland re-established in 1928. The latter has therefore always regarded itself as the direct continuation of the Załuski Library with its service to be considered merely "interrupted" by the Partitioning Powers for 133 years, and has continued to officially state the year 1747 as its date of foundation, as well as to number and celebrate its anniversaries accordingly.

=== Repeated destruction ===
In World War II, the German soldiers deliberately destroyed the collection (held in the Krasiński Library at the time) during the planned destruction of Warsaw in October 1944, after collapse of the Warsaw Uprising. Only 1800 manuscripts and 30,000 printed materials from the original library survived the war.

=== Present times ===
After the war, some of the items were successfully recovered and returned to the National Library of Poland, the successor to the Załuski Library. In 2023, George Windsor, Earl of St Andrews, a member of the British royal family, personally handed over the 1523 L'histoire de Primaleon de Grece by Francisco Vázquez after he realized the provenance of this book in his collections.

== Building ==
For the purpose of establishing the library, the brothers acquired the 17th-century Daniłowicz Palace in Warsaw, originally built for Mikołaj Daniłowicz of Żurów and ruined during the Swedish Deluge.

The building's reconstruction in rococo style was accomplished by Francesco Antonio Melana and his brother in 1745, thus enabling the Załuski brothers to officially establish the Załuski Library (Biblioteka Załuskich) two years later. The establishment had two stories, with a large and lavishly decorated reading room located on the second floor, and was topped with a small tower containing an astronomical observatory.

Following the library's looting and closure, its original seat was used for flour storage after 1807, and was subsequently altered into a tenement house in 1821. The building was destroyed by the Germans during World War II.

After the war, the original building was rebuilt under the Polish People's Republic. During the building's reconstruction, the busts of Polish monarchs that had originally adorned the library's interiors, and which had been hidden during the Partitions of Poland, were discovered and placed on the building's facade; hence the building has come to be called the "House Under the Kings" (Dom pod Królami). It has thereafter served as the headquarters of the Society of Authors ZAiKS.

== Gallery ==
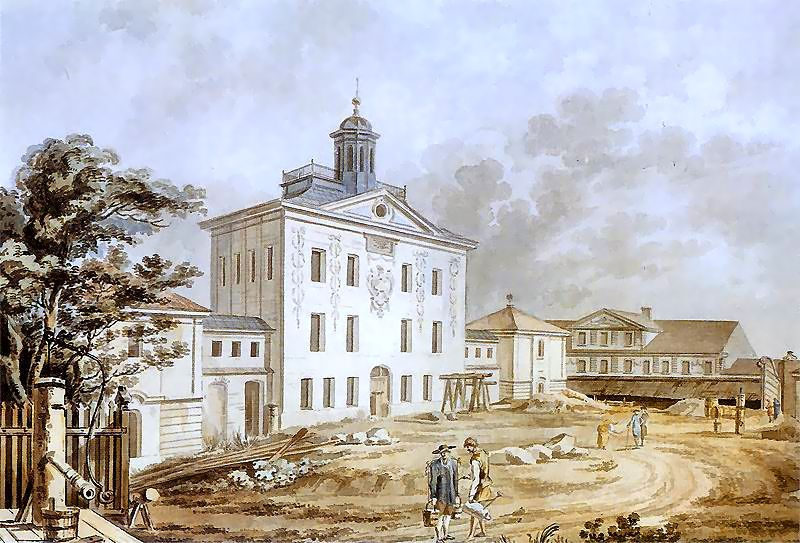
Załuski Library under construction, by Zygmunt Vogel

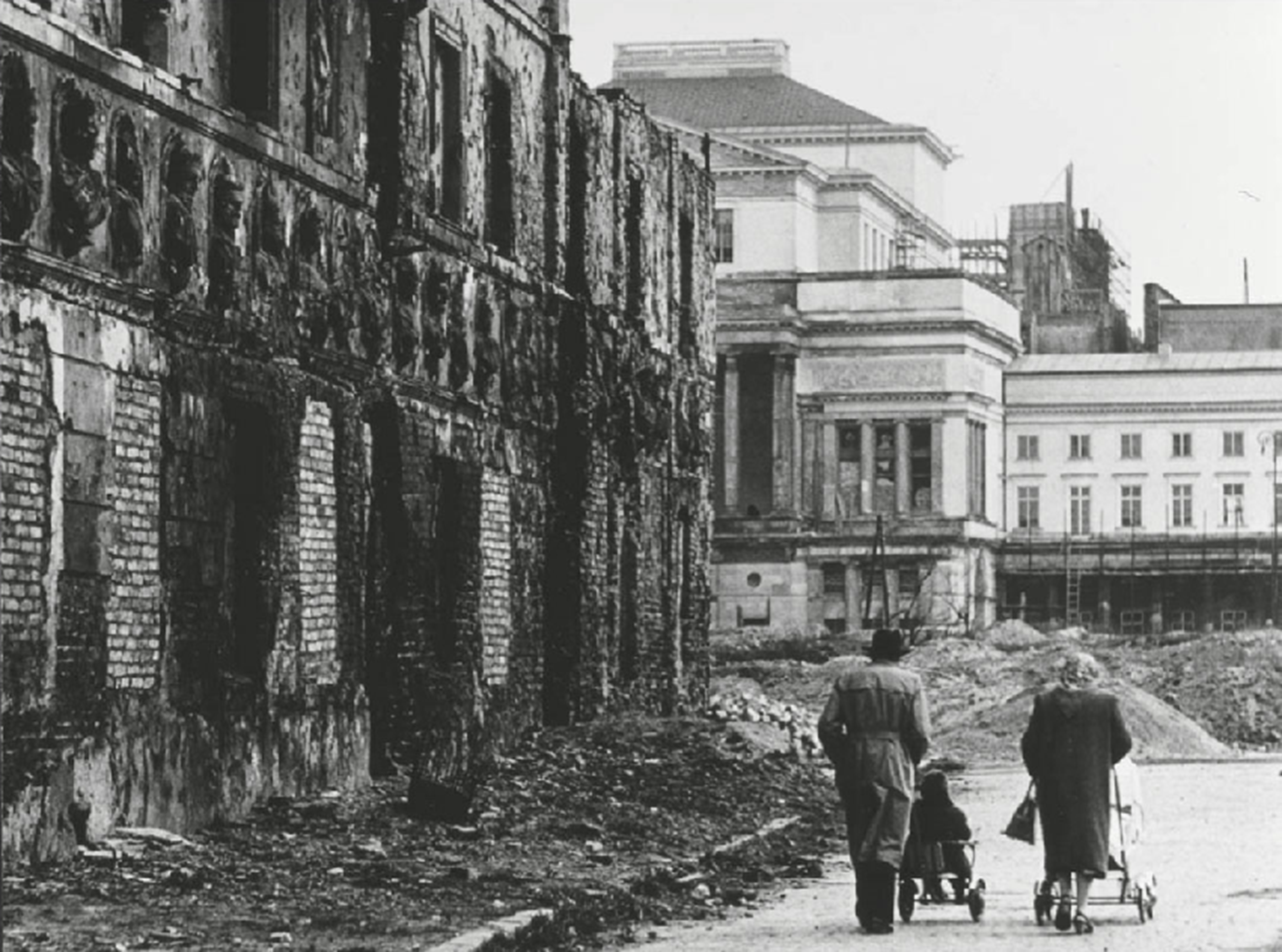
"House of the Kings" deliberately destroyed by the Germans in World War II

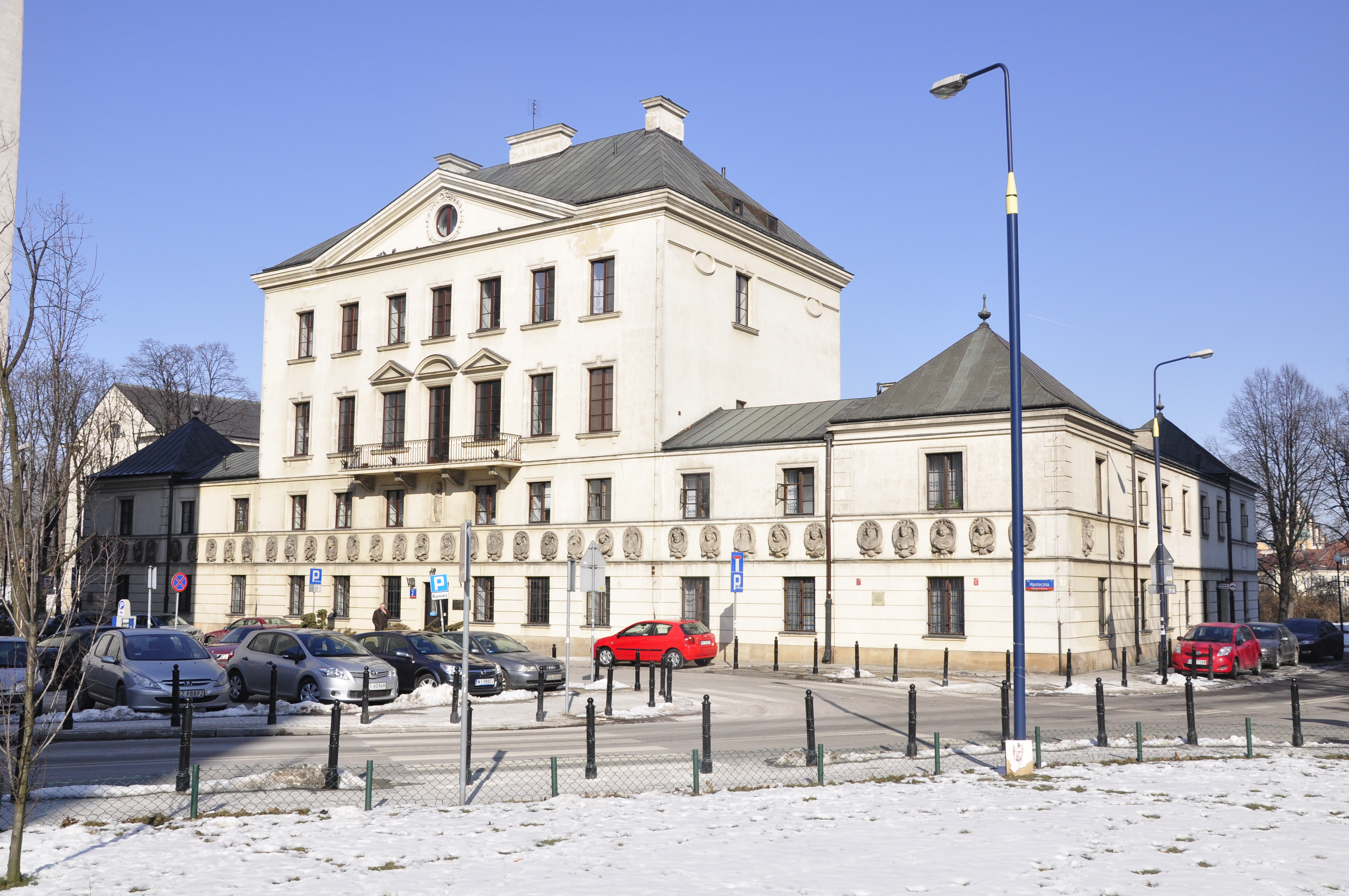
"House of the Kings" today (ul. Daniłowiczowska 14, corner of ul. Hipoteczna 2, Warsaw)

== See also ==
- Polish National Library
- Jagiellonian Library
- Royal Library in Warsaw
- Minuscule 569
- Ossolineum
- List of libraries in Poland
