= List of Polish cardinals =

Cardinals are senior ecclesiastical leaders of the Catholic Church, almost always ordained bishops and generally holding important roles within the church, such as governing prominent archdioceses or managing dicasteries within the Roman Curia. They are created in consistories by the pope and one of their foremost duties is the election of a new pope (invariably from among themselves, although not a formal requirement) when the Holy See is vacant, following the death or the resignation of the reigning pontiff. The body of all cardinals is collectively known as the College of Cardinals.

This list includes all ethnic Poles, living and deceased, who were raised to the rank of cardinal, including those who were born or carried out their pastoral services outside Poland, such as Cardinal Kazimierz Świątek who was born in Estonia and worked as a bishop in Belarus. People of other ethnic origins who were naturalized in Poland, such as the 17th-century Hungarian-born Cardinal Báthory Endre, are not included.

Three of the Polish cardinals, namely Fryderyk Jagiellończyk, Jan Olbracht Waza and Jan Kazimierz Waza, were of royal blood. The latter was elected king of Poland after he had renounced his cardinalate. Karol Wojtyła was the only Polish cardinal to be elected pope. As Pope John Paul II, he elevated ten of his compatriots to cardinalate, the largest number of Polish cardinals created by a single pope.

Roughly one out of two Polish cardinals was a bishop of one of Poland's historically two most important episcopal sees: Gniezno, the capital city of Poland until 1034, and Kraków, Poland's capital from 1038 to 1596. All bishops of Kraków since 1890 except Marek Jędraszewski, as well as all primates of Poland (an honorific title traditionally bestowed on the archbishop of Gniezno) between 1919 and 2009, were cardinals.

Cardinals are sorted in chronological order by date of elevation to cardinalate, indicated in the Elevated column. Cardinals elevated during the same century are marked by the same color on the bar on the left-hand side of the table. The date of elevation is the date of the consistory during which a given person was officially proclaimed cardinal by the pope. In some cases, especially in former times, a cardinal may have received the red hat after the consistory or never. Those, whose elevation was intended by a pope, but died before the consistory, as well as pseudocardinals elevated by antipopes, are listed in italics.

Two of the cardinals listed here, Jan Olbracht Waza and Marian Jaworski, were elevated in pectore, which means that their names were kept secret by the pope and revealed only on later consistories. In these cases, the date of elevation is the date of the in pectore elevation, not the date of the subsequent publication.

Cardinals are technically deacons or priests of Roman churches known as tituli. Their ranks (cardinal deacon or cardinal priest; there have been no cardinal bishops of Polish origin) and titular churches are indicated in the Cardinal title column. The "Other titles" column shows other, especially episcopal, titles held by the given person during his cardinalate.

The Conclaves column lists all conclaves, that is papal elections, that took place during a person's cardinalate and indicates whether he participated in a given conclave or not. Since Ingravescentem aetatem in 1970, cardinals who are 80 years or older at the beginning of a conclave are ineligible to participate.

The Ref. column provides links to external online references.

Cent.	Name	Born	Elevated	Cardinal title	Other titles	Conclaves	Died	Notes	Ref.	Image
15th	Zbigniew Oleśnicki	Sienno, 5 December 1389	18 December 1439 by Pope Eugene IV	Cardinal Priest of S. Prisca	Bishop of Kraków	1447 – absent	Sandomierz, 1 April 1455	Also created pseudocardinal by Antipope Felix V in 1440, whose nomination Oleśnicki declined. Pope Nicholas V confirmed Eugene's nomination and sent Oleśnicki his red hat in 1449.	Herbermann, Charles, ed. (1913). "Zbigniew Olesnicki" . Catholic Encyclopedia. New York: Robert Appleton Company. Miranda	Zbigniew Oleśnicki
	Alexander of Masovia	Płock, 1400	2 October 1440 by Antipope Felix V	Cardinal Priest of S. Lorenzo in Damaso	Bishop of Trent	None	Vienna, Austria; 2 June 1444	Pseudocardinal	Miranda	Alexander of Masovia
	Wincenty Kot	Dębno, ca.1395	6 April 1444 by Antipope Felix V	Cardinal Priest of S. Crisogono	Archbishop of Gniezno	None	Gniezno, 14 April 1448	Pseudocardinal; resigned the pseudocardinalate on 2 October 1447. Applied for recognition of his promotion from Pope Nicholas V, but died before obtaining it.	Miranda	Wincenty Kot
	Fryderyk Jagiellończyk	Kraków, 27 April 1468	20 September 1493 by Pope Alexander VI	Cardinal Priest of S. Lucia in Septisolio	Archbishop of Gniezno, Bishop of Kraków	None	Kraków, 14 March 1503	Son of King Casimir IV of Poland, brother of Saint Casimir	Miranda	Fryderyk Jagiellończyk
16th	Stanisław Hozjusz	Kraków, 5 May 1504	26 February 1561 by Pope Pius IV	Cardinal Priest of S. Lorenzo in Panisperna	Bishop of Ermland	1565 – absent; 1572 – participated	Capranica, Italy, 5 August 1579		"Stanislaus Hosius". Catholic-Hierarchy.org. David M. Cheney. Miranda	Stanisław Hozjusz
	Jerzy Radziwiłł	Wilno (now Vilnius, Lithuania), 31 May 1556	12 December 1583 by Pope Gregory XIII	Cardinal Priest of S. Sisto	Bishop of Wilno until 1591, Bishop of Kraków thereafter	1585, Sep 1590, Oct 1590 – absent; 1591, 1592 – participated	Rome, Italy, 21 January 1600		"Jerzy Radziwiłł". Catholic-Hierarchy.org. David M. Cheney. Miranda	Jerzy Radziwiłł
17th	Bernard Maciejowski	1548	9 June 1604 by Pope Clement VIII	Cardinal Priest of S. Giovanni a Porta Latina	Bishop of Kraków until 1606, Archbishop of Gniezno thereafter	Mar 1605, May 1605 – absent	Kraków, 19 January 1608		"Bernard Maciejowski". Catholic-Hierarchy.org. David M. Cheney. Miranda	Bernard Maciejowski
	Jan Olbracht Waza	Kraków, 25 May 1612	19 November 1629 in pectore by Pope Urban VIII	Cardinal Deacon of S. Maria in Aquiro	Bishop of Kraków	None	Padua, Italy, 29 December 1634	Son of King Sigismund III of Poland. Elevated in pectore, announced on 20 December 1632.	"Jan Olbracht Waza". Catholic-Hierarchy.org. David M. Cheney. Miranda	Jan Olbracht Waza
	Jan Kazimierz Waza	Kraków, 22 May 1609	28 May 1646 by Pope Innocent X	(Never received the red hat and the title)	None	None	Nevers, France, 16 December 1672	Son of King Sigismund III of Poland. Resigned the cardinalate in 1647, resignation accepted by the pope on 6 July 1648. King of Poland 1648–1668.	Miranda	Jan Kazimierz Waza
	Michał Radziejowski	Poznań, 3 December 1645	2 September 1686 by Pope Innocent XI	Cardinal Priest of S. Maria della Pace	Bishop of Ermland until 1688, Archbishop of Gniezno thereafter	1689, 1691, 1700 – absent	Gdańsk, 11 October 1705		"Michał Radziejowski". Catholic-Hierarchy.org. David M. Cheney. Miranda	Michał Radziejowski
	Jan Kazimierz Denhoff	Warsaw, 8 June 1649	2 September 1686 by Pope Innocent XI	Cardinal Priest of S. Giovanni a Porta Latina	Bishop of Cesena, Italy; Camerlengo of the Sacred College of Cardinals 1695–1696	1689, 1691 – participated	Rome, 20 June 1697		"Jan Kazimierz Denhoff". Catholic-Hierarchy.org. David M. Cheney. Miranda	Jan Kazimierz Denhoff
18th	Jan Aleksander Lipski	Olszyna, 15 June 1690	20 December 1737 by Pope Clement XII	(Never received the red hat and the title)	Bishop of Kraków	1740 – absent	Kielce, 20 February 1746		"Jan Aleksander Lipski". Catholic-Hierarchy.org. David M. Cheney. Miranda	Jan Aleksander Lipski
19th	Leon Michał Przyłuski	Strzeszynek (now part of Poznań), 5 October 1789	Elevation intended by Pope Pius IX to take place on 22 June 1866	(Died before consistory)	Archbishop of Gnesen-Posen (Gniezno-Poznań)	None	Poznań, 12 March 1865	The pope intended to elevate Przyłuski to cardinalate, but the bishop died before the consistory was announced.	"Leon Michał Przyłuski". Catholic-Hierarchy.org. David M. Cheney. Miranda	Leon Michał Przyłuski
	Mieczysław Ledóchowski	Górki, 29 October 1822	15 March 1875 by Pope Pius IX	Cardinal Priest of S. Maria in Ara Coeli	Archbishop of Gnesen-Posen (Gniezno-Poznań) until 1896, Prefect of the Congregation for Propagation of the Faith thereafter	1878 – participated	Rome, 22 July 1902		"Mieczysław Ledóchowski". Catholic-Hierarchy.org. David M. Cheney. Miranda	Mieczysław Ledóchowski
	Włodzimierz Czacki	Poryck (now Pavlivka, Ukraine), 16 April 1834	25 September 1882 by Pope Leo XIII	Cardinal Priest of S. Pudenziana	Titular Archbishop of Salamis, Apostolic Nuncio to France	None	Rome, 8 March 1888		"Włodzimierz Czacki". Catholic-Hierarchy.org. David M. Cheney. Miranda	Włodzimierz Czacki
	Albin Dunajewski	Stanislau (now Ivano-Frankivsk, Ukraine), 1 March 1817	23 June 1890 by Pope Leo XIII	Cardinal Priest of Ss. Vitale, Valeria, Gervasio e Protasio	Bishop of Krakau (Kraków)	None	Krakau (Kraków), 18 June 1894		"Albin Dunajewski". Catholic-Hierarchy.org. David M. Cheney. Miranda	Albin Dunajewski
20th	Jan Puzyna	Gwoździec (now Hvizdets, Ukraine); 13 September 1842	15 April 1901 by Pope Leo XIII	Cardinal Priest of Ss. Vitale, Valeria, Gervasio e Protasio	Bishop of Krakau (Kraków)	1903 – participated	Krakau (Kraków), 8 September 1911	At the conclave of 1903, Puzyna vetoed the election of Cardinal Mariano Rampolla in the name of Emperor Francis Joseph I of Austria-Hungary.	"Jan Puzyna". Catholic-Hierarchy.org. David M. Cheney. Miranda	Jan Puzyna
	Edmund Dalbor	Ostrowo (now Ostrów Wielkopolski), 30 October 1869	15 December 1919 by Pope Benedict XV	Cardinal Priest of S. Giovanni a Porta Latina	Archbishop of Gniezno-Poznań	1922 – participated	Poznań, 13 February 1926		"Edmund Dalbor". Catholic-Hierarchy.org. David M. Cheney. Miranda	Edmund Dalbor
	Aleksander Kakowski	Dębiny, 5 February 1862	15 December 1919 by Pope Benedict XV	Cardinal Priest of S. Agostino	Archbishop of Warsaw	1922 – participated	Warsaw, 30 December 1938	Member of the Regency Council 1917–1918	"Aleksander Kakowski". Catholic-Hierarchy.org. David M. Cheney. Miranda	Aleksander Kakowski
	August Hlond	Myslowitz (now Mysłowice), 5 July 1881	20 June 1927 by Pope Pius XI	Cardinal Priest of S. Maria della Pace	Archbishop of Gniezno-Poznań until 1946, Archbishop of Gniezno and Warsaw thereafter	1939 – participated	Warsaw, 22 October 1948	Beatification process started in 1992.	"August Hlond". Catholic-Hierarchy.org. David M. Cheney. Miranda	August Hlond
	Adam Stefan Sapieha	Krasiczyn, 14 May 1867	18 February 1946 by Pope Pius XII	Cardinal Priest of S. Maria Nuova	Archbishop of Kraków	None	Kraków, 21 July 1951		"Adam Stefan Sapieha". Catholic-Hierarchy.org. David M. Cheney. Miranda	Adam Stefan Sapieha
	Stefan Wyszyński	Zuzela, 3 August 1901	12 January 1953 by Pope Pius XII	Cardinal Priest of S. Maria in Trastevere	Archbishop of Gniezno and Warsaw	1958, 1963, Aug 1978, Oct 1978 – participated	Warsaw, 28 May 1981	Impeded from attending the consistory, he received the red hat on 18 May 1957. Beatified in 2021.	"Stefan Wyszyński". Catholic-Hierarchy.org. David M. Cheney. Miranda	Stefan Wyszyński
	Karol Wojtyła	Wadowice, 18 May 1920	26 June 1967 by Pope Paul VI	Cardinal Priest of S. Cesareo in Palatio	Archbishop of Kraków	Aug 1978 – participated; Oct 1978 – participated, elected	Rome, 2 April 2005	Elected pope on 16 October 1978, took the name John Paul II. Canonized in 2014.	"Karol Wojtyła". Catholic-Hierarchy.org. David M. Cheney. Miranda	John Paul II (Karol Wojtyła)
	Bolesław Kominek	Radlin, 23 December 1903	5 March 1973 by Pope Paul VI	Cardinal Priest of S. Croce in via Flaminia	Archbishop of Wrocław	None	Wrocław, 10 March 1974		"Bolesław Kominek". Catholic-Hierarchy.org. David M. Cheney. Miranda	Bolesław Kominek
	Bolesław Filipiak	Ośniszczewko, 1 September 1901	24 May 1976 by Pope Pope Paul VI	Cardinal Deacon of S. Giovanni Bosco in via Tuscolana	Titular Bishop of Plestia, Dean of the Roman Rota	Aug 1978 – absent (poor health); Oct 1978 – absent (died on the first day)	Poznań, 14 October 1978		"Bolesław Filipiak". Catholic-Hierarchy.org. David M. Cheney. Miranda	Bolesław Filipiak
	Władysław Rubin	Toki (now in Ukraine), 20 September 1917	30 June 1979 by Pope John Paul II	Cardinal Deacon of S. Maria in Via Lata	Titular Bishop of Serta, Prefect of the Congregation for the Oriental Churches until 1985	None	Rome, 28 November 1990		"Władysław Rubin". Catholic-Hierarchy.org. David M. Cheney. Miranda	Władysław Rubin
	Franciszek Macharski	Kraków, 20 May 1927	30 June 1979 by Pope John Paul II	Cardinal Priest of S. Giovanni a Porta Latina	Archbishop of Kraków until 2005	2005 – participated; 2013 – no voting rights	Kraków, 2 August 2016	Lost electoral rights in 2007	"Franciszek Macharski". Catholic-Hierarchy.org. David M. Cheney. Miranda	Franciszek Macharski
	Józef Glemp	Inowrocław, 18 December 1929	2 February 1983 by Pope John Paul II	Cardinal Priest of S. Maria in Trastevere	Archbishop of Gniezno until 1992, Archbishop of Warsaw until 2006	2005 – participated	Warsaw, 23 January 2013	Lost electoral rights in 2009	"Józef Glemp". Catholic-Hierarchy.org. David M. Cheney. Miranda	Józef Glemp
	Andrzej Maria Deskur	Sancygniów, 29 February 1924	25 May 1985 by Pope John Paul II	Cardinal Deacon of S. Cesareo in Palatio (title elevated to Cardinal Priest in 1996)	Titular Archbishop of Thenae, President of the Pontifical Council for Social Communications until 1984	2005 – no voting rights	Rome, 3 September 2011	Lost electoral rights in 2004	"Andrzej Maria Deskur". Catholic-Hierarchy.org. David M. Cheney. Miranda	
	Henryk Gulbinowicz	Wilno (now Vilnius, Lithuania), 17 October 1923	25 May 1985 by Pope John Paul II	Cardinal Priest of Immacolata Concezione di Maria a Grottarossa	Archbishop of Wrocław until 2004	2005, 2013 – no voting rights	Wrocław, 16 November 2020	Lost electoral rights in 2003	"Henryk Gulbinowicz". Catholic-Hierarchy.org. David M. Cheney. Miranda	Henryk Gulbinowicz
	Kazimierz Świątek	Valga, Estonia, 21 October 1914	26 November 1994 by Pope John Paul II	Cardinal Priest of S. Gerardo Maiella	Archbishop of Minsk-Mohilev, Belarus, until 2006	2005 – no voting rights	Pinsk, Belarus, 21 July 2011	Never had electoral rights. First cardinal from Belarus.	"Kazimierz Świątek". Catholic-Hierarchy.org. David M. Cheney. Miranda	Kazimierz Świątek
	Adam Kozłowiecki	Huta Komorowska, 1 April 1911	21 February 1998 by Pope John Paul II	Cardinal Priest of S. Andrea al Quirinale	Former Archbishop of Lusaka, Zambia; Titular Archbishop of Potentia in Piceno	2005 – no voting rights	Lusaka, Zambia, 28 September 2007	Never had electoral rights. First cardinal from Zambia.	"Adam Kozłowiecki". Catholic-Hierarchy.org. David M. Cheney. Miranda	Adam Kozłowiecki
	Marian Jaworski	Lwów (now Lviv, Ukraine), 21 August 1926	21 February 1998 in pectore by Pope John Paul II	Cardinal Priest of S. Sisto	Archbishop of Lviv, Ukraine, until 2008	2005 – participated; 2013 – no voting rights	Kraków, 5 September 2020	Elevated in pectore, announced on 21 February 2001. Lost electoral rights in 2006.	"Marian Jaworski". Catholic-Hierarchy.org. David M. Cheney. Miranda	Marian Jaworski
21st	Zenon Grocholewski	Bródki, 11 October 1939	21 February 2001 by Pope John Paul II	Cardinal Deacon of S. Nicola in Carcere	Titular Archbishop of Acropolis, Prefect of the Congregation for Catholic Education until 2015	2005, 2013 – participated	Rome, 17 July 2020	Lost electoral rights in 2019.	"Zenon Grocholewski". Catholic-Hierarchy.org. David M. Cheney. Miranda	Zenon Grocholewski
	Stanisław Nagy	Berun (now Bieruń), 30 September 1921	21 October 2003 by Pope John Paul II	Cardinal Deacon of S. Maria della Scala	Titular Archbishop of Hólar	2005, 2013 – no voting rights	Kraków, 5 June 2013	Never had electoral rights.	"Stanisław Nagy". Catholic-Hierarchy.org. David M. Cheney. Miranda	Stanisław Nagy
	Stanisław Dziwisz	Raba Wyżna, 27 April 1939	24 March 2006 by Pope Benedict XVI	Cardinal Priest of S. Maria del Popolo	Archbishop of Kraków until 2016	2013 – participated, 2025 – no voting rights	Living	Lost electoral rights in 2019	"Stanisław Dziwisz". Catholic-Hierarchy.org. David M. Cheney. Miranda	Stanisław Dziwisz
	Ignacy Jeż	Radomyśl Wielki, 31 July 1914	Elevation intended by Pope Benedict XVI to take place on 24 November 2007	(Died before consistory)	Bishop Emeritus of Koszalin-Kołobrzeg	None	Rome, 16 October 2007	The pope intended to elevate Jeż to cardinalate, but the bishop died one day before the consistory was announced. The pope later confirmed that Jeż should be counted as a cardinal.	"Ignacy Jeż". Catholic-Hierarchy.org. David M. Cheney. Miranda; KAI	Ignacy Jeż
	Stanisław Ryłko	Andrychów, 4 July 1945	24 November 2007 by Pope Benedict XVI	Cardinal Deacon of Sacro Cuore di Cristo Re	Titular Archbishop of Novica, President of the Pontifical Council for the Laity until 2016	2013, 2025 – participated	Living	Lost electoral rights in 2025	"Stanisław Ryłko". Catholic-Hierarchy.org. David M. Cheney. Miranda	Stanisław Ryłko
	Kazimierz Nycz	Stara Wieś, 1 February 1950	20 November 2010 by Pope Benedict XVI	Cardinal Priest of Ss. Silvestro e Martino ai Monti	Archbishop of Warsaw until 2024	2013, 2025 – participated	Living		"Kazimierz Nycz". Catholic-Hierarchy.org. David M. Cheney. Miranda	Kazimierz Nycz
	Konrad Krajewski	Łódź, 25 November 1963	28 June 2018 by Pope Francis	Cardinal Deacon of Santa Maria Immacolata all'Esquilino	Titular Bishop of Beneventum and Prefect of the Dicastery for the Service of Charity until 2026, Archbishop of Łódź thereafter	2025 – participated	Living		"Konrad Krajewski". Catholic-Hierarchy.org. David M. Cheney. Miranda	Konrad Krajewski
	Grzegorz Ryś	Kraków, 9 February 1964	30 September 2023 by Pope Francis	Cardinal Priest of Ss. Cirillo e Metodio	Archbishop of Łódź until 2025, Archbishop of Kraków thereafter	2025 – participated	Living		"Grzegorz Ryś". Catholic-Hierarchy.org. David M. Cheney.	Grzegorz Ryś

== Polish cardinals eligible for participation in a conclave ==
As of 2025, three of the living Polish cardinals listed above are less than 80 years old and hence eligible to participate in a conclave. They are listed below by date of birth.

Name	Born	Age	Electoral rights expire
Kazimierz Nycz	1 February 1950	76	1 February 2030
Konrad Krajewski	25 November 1963	62	25 November 2043
Grzegorz Ryś	9 February 1964	62	9 February 2044

== Sources ==
- Miranda, Salvador (1998–2008). "The Cardinals of the Holy Roman Church". Florida International University Library.
- Cheney, David (1996–2007). "The Hierarchy of the Catholic Church".
- "The Catholic Encyclopedia". Robert Appleton Company. 1911.
