= Jan Aleksander Lipski =

Bishop of Kraków (1690–1746)

- Cardinal, Bishop of Kraków
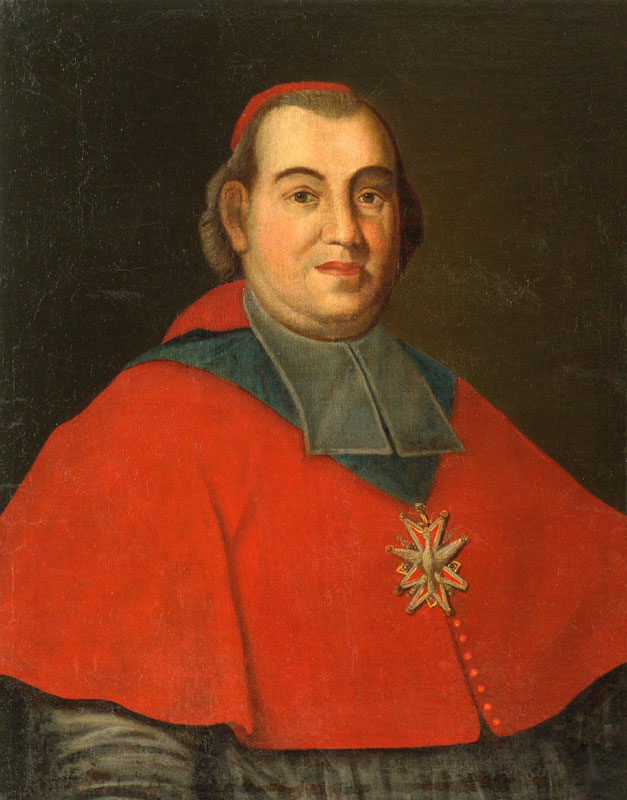
- Wearing the Order of the White Eagle
- Predecessor: Konstanty Felicjan Szaniawski
- Successor: Andrzej Stanisław Załuski

Personal details
- Born: 1690
- Died: 1746
- Buried: Wawel Cathedral

Jan Aleksander Lipski (1690 – 1746) was a Polish nobleman and clergyman. He was Bishop of Kraków and later a cardinal of Poland.

Lipski was born in 1690. His initial education was with the Jesuits in Kalisz, and he later received an education in Paris and Rome. As he acquired connections with prominent people, including King Augustus II the Strong, he took roles in Gniezno and with the Crown Tribunal. In 1732, he was made Bishop of Kraków, having been made Bishop of Łuck in the prior year. As Bishop of Kraków, he crowned King Augustus III in 1734. Lipski was made cardinal in 1737. He did not travel to Rome to receive the title of cardinal.

Lipski was a recipient of the Order of the White Eagle.

Lipski died in 1746 at Kielce. He is buried at the Wawel Cathedral in the Lipski chapel designed by Franciszek Placidi.

== See also ==
- List of Polish cardinals
- Roman Catholic Archdiocese of Kraków

Catholic Church titles
Preceded by Konstanty Felicjan Szaniawski	Bishop of Kraków; 1732-1746	Succeeded by Andrzej Stanisław Załuski
