= Załucki =

Załucki, feminine: Załucka is a Polish toponymic surname. Outside Poland it may also be spelled as "Zalucky". Russified form: Zalutsky. Notable people with the surname include:

- Andrzej Załucki
- Marian Załucki (1920–1979), Polish poet, satirist and writer
- Myron P. Zalucki

== See also ==
- Załuski
