= Centre for Public Opinion Research =

Polling institute in Poland

Centrum Badania Opinii Społecznej (CBOS; English: Centre for Public Opinion Research) is an opinion polling institute in Poland, based in Warsaw. Originally established in communist Poland in 1982, it has operated as a non-profit public foundation created by a special law since 1997 (Ustawy o fundacji Centrum Badania Opinii Społecznej z dn. 20 lutego 1997 r., Dz.U. nr 30, poz. 163). Its statutory purpose is to provide data on the population's opinion regarding political and social issues. Major Polish newspapers and news magazines, such as Gazeta Wyborcza, Rzeczpospolita, and Polityka, regularly commission CBOS to conduct polls. Apart from its public function, CBOS also conducts commercial market research to help finance its operations.

CBOS conducts a monthly survey on a representative sample of 1,000 adult persons entitled "Current Problems and Events" (Aktualne problemy i wydarzenia). The findings are published on a monthly basis and made available on the internet with a one-month delay (since 1998). Each monthly report focuses on a specific topic, with certain topics recurring in regular intervals. An abridged English-language newsletter, entitled "Polish Public Opinion" and containing summaries of results on various topics, is also available online and free of charge. In total, CBOS publishes more than 200 reports and books each year.

CBOS employs a staff of 40+ sociologists, economists, statisticians, and computer scientists at its seat in Warsaw, and a nationwide network of interviewers. CBOS's work is supervised by a board established per the 1997 law, consisting of seven academic experts appointed by the council of ministers and the representatives of the Sejm, the Senate, the prime minister, and the president.

== Criticism ==
CBOS has been accused of performing "magic" on behalf of their clients by both wPolityce.pl magazine, and Gazeta Wyborcza. For example, results of a survey conducted by CBOS prior to presidential elections of 2015 had shown rapidly growing support for Civic Platform (Platforma Obywatelska) even though only ten days earlier, in a different survey conducted by CBOS on behalf of TVN24 (a different client), the Law and Justice (Prawo i Sprawiedliwość, PiS) was ahead of PO in terms of popularity. Agnieszka Kublik writing for Gazeta Wyborcza noted that the poll was a failure not only because of how respondents were being approached by CBOS, but also because of its perceived political affiliations.

After the parliamentary election 2019, Europe Elects showed that CBOS had the largest accumulative error among all Polish pollsters, favouring especially the government party PiS.
