= Teresa Załuska =

Polish noblewoman and orator

Teresa Załuska (1676–1759) was a Polish noblewoman and orator. She is foremost known for her political activity and her talent as orator. She supported Stanisław Leszczyński during the War of the Polish Succession. She is famous for the speech she gave to the Crown Tribunal in defense against the confiscation of her property, which was printed and published.
