= Olszyna, Ostrzeszów County =

Olszyna
- Village
- Location within Poland
- Coordinates: 51°24′33″N 17°54′42″E
- Country: Poland
- Voivodeship: Greater Poland
- County: Ostrzeszów
- Gmina: Ostrzeszów

Olszyna [ɔlˈʂɨna] is a village in the administrative district of Gmina Ostrzeszów, within Ostrzeszów County, Greater Poland Voivodeship, in west-central Poland.
