= Andrzej Stanisław Załuski =

Polish bishop and noble

- Bishop of Kraków
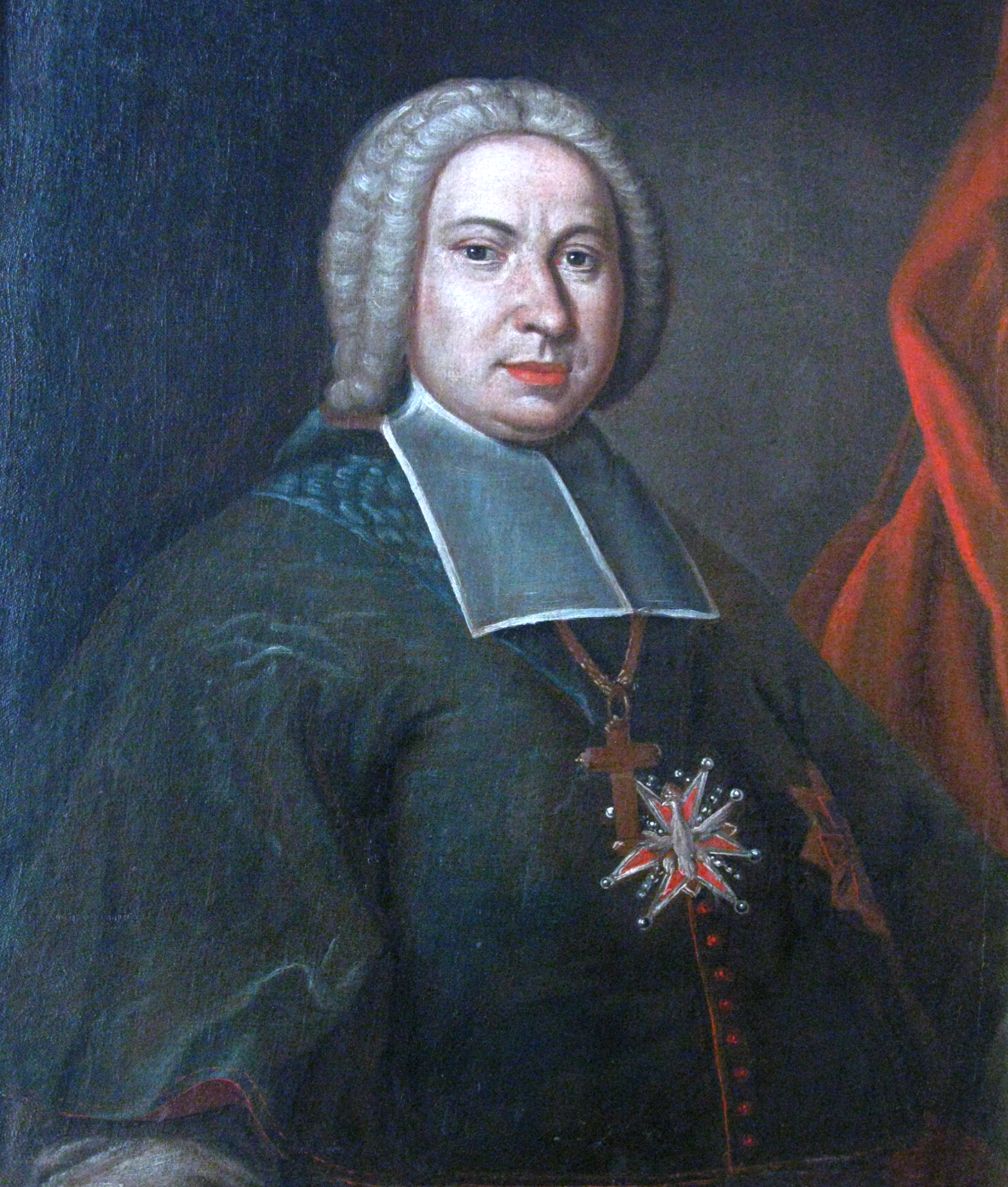
- Church: Catholic Church
- Diocese: Diocese of Kraków
- In office: 2 May 1746 – 16 December 1758
- Predecessor: Jan Aleksander Lipski
- Successor: Kajetan Sołtyk
- Previous posts: Bishop of Chelmno (1739-1746); Bishop of Lutsk (1736-1739); Bishop of Płock (1723-1736)

Orders
- Consecration: 13 February 1724 by Konstanty Felicjan Szaniawski

Personal details
- Born: Andrzej Stanisław Kostka Załuski; 2 December 1695 Jedlińsk, Sandomierz Voivodeship, Kingdom of Poland and the Grand Duchy of Lithuania
- Died: 16 December 1758 (aged 63)

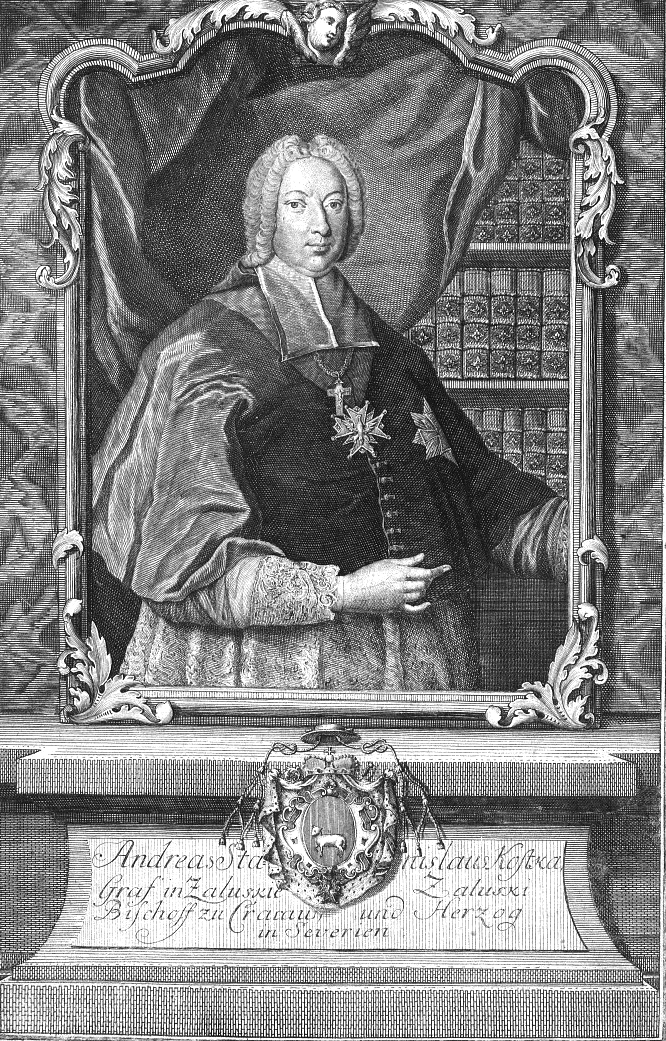
Andrzej Stanisław Załuski

Andrzej Stanisław Kostka Załuski (2 December 1695 – 16 December 1758) was a priest (bishop) in the Polish–Lithuanian Commonwealth.

In his religious career, he held the posts of abbot and later Bishop of Płock (from 1723, simultaneously serving as Apostolic Administrator of the Diocese of Pomesania), Bishop of Łuck (1736), Bishop of Chełmno (1739), and Bishop of Cracow (1746). He was a supporter of the Jesuits in Poland.

A member of the Polish nobility (szlachta) of the Junosza coat of arms, he also held the position of the Great Crown Chancellor from 1735 to 1746. As a politician, he was engaged in the movement that wanted to reform the failing political system of the Commonwealth.

He studied in Danzig and Rome.

Załuski was a corresponding member of Societas eruditorum incognitorum in terris Austriacis, the first learned society in Habsburg Austria.

Along with his brother Józef Andrzej Załuski, the bishop of Kyiv, he co-founded the Załuski Library, one of the largest 18th-century book collections in the world. He also sponsored the seminary in Pułtusk.

== See also ==
- History of philosophy in Poland

== Footnotes ==
Preceded by Jan Szembek	Grand Chancellor of the Crown; 1735–1746	Succeeded by Jan Małachowski
Catholic Church titles
Preceded by Ludwik Bartłomiej Załuski	Bishop of Płock; 1723–1736	Succeeded by Antoni Sebastian Dembowski
Unknown	Bishop of Łuck; 1736–1739	Unknown
Preceded by Adam Stanislaus Grabowski	Bishop of Chełmno; 1739–1746	Succeeded by Wojciech Stanisław Leski
Preceded by Jan Aleksander Lipski	Bishop of Kraków; 1746–1758	Succeeded by Kajetan Sołtyk
