= Ludwik Bartłomiej Załuski =

Polish cardinal

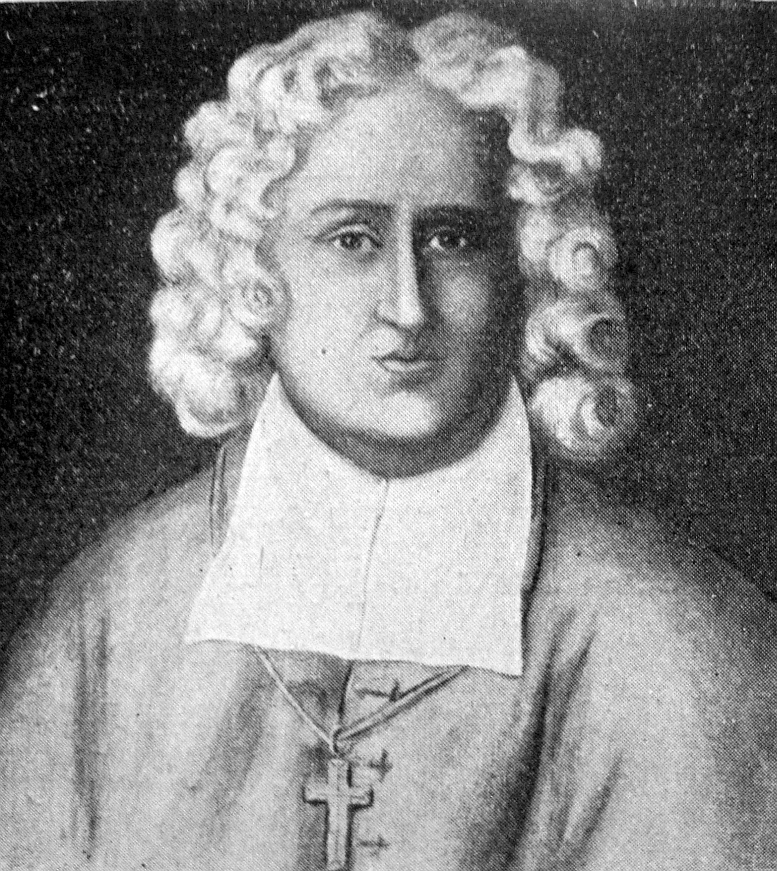
Louis Bartholomew Zaluski

Ludwik Bartłomiej Załuski (born 1 June 1661 – 24 December 1721 in Warsaw, Poland) was a Polish Cardinal of the Roman Catholic Church Auxiliary Bishop of Przemysl, and the Bishop of Płock.

== Early life ==
He was born 1661 into the Junosza noble family, the son of Alexander a voivodeship Governor, and his wife Catherine. He was related to Andrzej Stanisław Załuski, Bishop of Cracow and brother of his own predecessor Andrzej Chryzostom Załuski. His other brothers included Marcin Załuski and Aleksander Józef Załuski.

Educated in Rome and Paris, His career included being Canon of Kraków, curator of the Royal Treasury and, Chancellor of Crown Queen Maria Casimira.

== Episcopal career ==
On 1 April 1699 he became bishop of Płock, replacing Andrew Chrysostom his brother. His reign as Bishop coincided with the Great Northern War, with some 50 destroyed churches. However, he worked to rebuild and expand the number of churches. He also opened on 6 May 1710 a Seminary in Płock. In 1720 began construction on the back of the Church of our Lady of Graces in Warsaw and the Jesuit college there.

Religious titles
Preceded by Andrzej Chryzostom Załuski	Bishop of Płock; 1692-1699	Succeeded by Andrzej Stanisław Załuski
