= Andrzej Chryzostom Załuski =

Polish preacher, translator, writer, Chancellor of the Crown and bishop

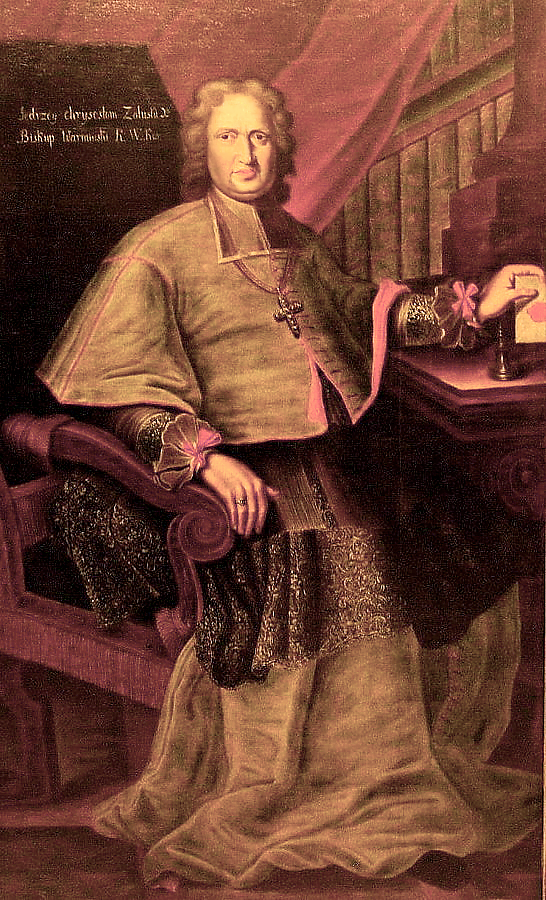
Andrzej Chryzostom Załuski

Andrzej Chryzostom Załuski (1650 – 12 May 1711) was a 17th-century Polish preacher, translator, prolific writer, Chancellor of the Crown and bishop.

== Early life ==
He was born in 1650 in Kiev, into the Junosza noble family, the son of Alexander, a voivodeship governor, and his wife Catherine Olszowskich. He was also related to Andrzej Stanisław Załuski, Bishop of Cracow, and his own successor Louis Bartholomew Załuski. His other brothers included Marcin Załuski and Aleksander Józef Załuski.

== Episcopal career ==
As a priest he travelled, Paris, Netherlands and Rome and after receiving the lower orders became Canon of Kraków (1673). At this time he was acted in a diplomatic role. In 1674 and 1675 he travelled to Spain and Portugal. He was also a trusted advisor to Jan III Sobieski giving sermons before the king at the Sejm Coronation in 1676, and in 1683 on the return of the king following the important Battle of Vienna.

He was Bishop of Kiev from 1683 and then, of Płock (1692). In 1699 he was made Bishop of Warmia and was great Chancellor of the Crown from 1703.

He is known to have attended Synods in 1693, 1696 and 1698 and built the chapel of the Holy Cross, which he consecrated on 30 September 1709. Although his was a time of war and plague he managed to undertake significant amount of writing.

He died on 12 May 1711 in Dobre Miasto.

Religious titles
Preceded by Stanisław Dąmbski	Bishop of Płock; 1692–1699	Succeeded by Ludwik Bartłomiej Załuski
