= Konstanty Felicjan Szaniawski =

Former Bishop of Krakow

- Bishop of Kraków
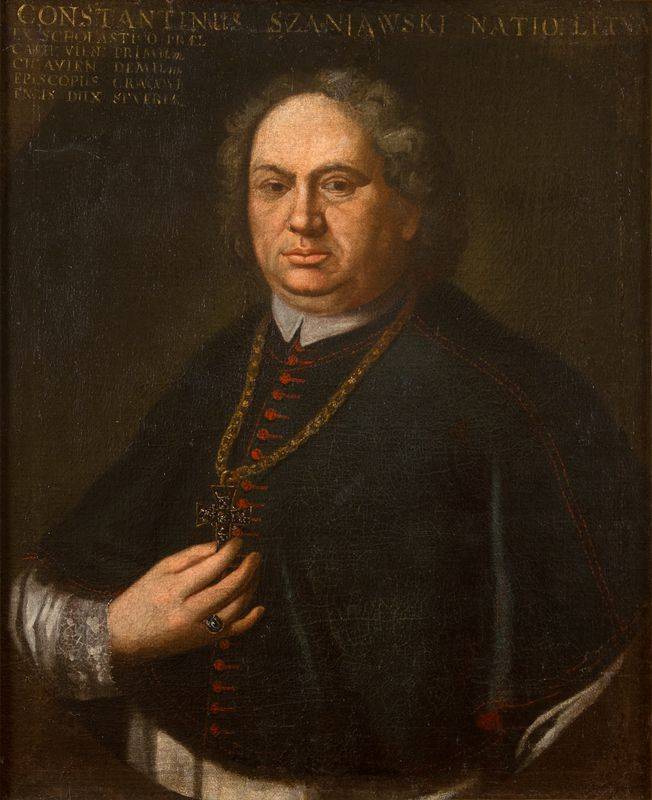
- Predecessor: Kazimierz Łubieński
- Successor: Jan Aleksander Lipski
- Previous post: Bishop of Kujawy

Personal details
- Born: 1668
- Died: 1732 (aged 63–64)
- Buried: Wawel Cathedral
- Coat of arms

Konstanty Felicjan Szaniawski (1668–1732) was a Polish nobleman and clergyman. He was Bishop of Kujawy and Bishop of Kraków (1720–1732).

== Life ==
Konstanty Felicjan Szaniawski was born in Lithuania in 1668. His family claimed the Junosza arms. He studied at the Kraków Academy in his youth. As Bishop of Kujawy, one of his earlier posts, he played a political role during the Tarnogród Confederation by liaising with the Russian tsar.

In 1719, Szaniawski reinvigorated a failing seminary in Włocławek, and granted control of the seminary to the Vincentians. In return, annual reports were sent to him. Samuel Orgelbrand's encyclopedia says that much of Szaniawski's career was spent by founding churches, seminaries, and schools.

According to historian Józef Feldman, Szaniawski was considered to be highly capable and ambitious, and this was reflected in the personal writings of Szaniawski's peers and other nobles. While Szaniawski came from a noble family, he had been born into the "petty nobility", and so only with high ambition and ability was he able to achieve his prestigious political career in Kraków.

Szaniawski died in 1732. His tombstone is at Wawel Cathedral.
